= Atacama Desert =

Plateau on Pacific coast of South America

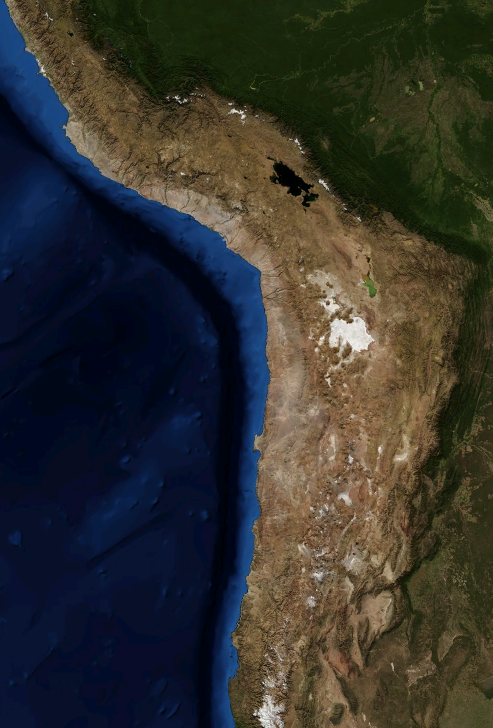
- Atacama by NASA World Wind

- Map of the Atacama Desert: the area most commonly defined as Atacama is in yellow. In orange are the outlying arid areas of the southern Chala, Altiplano, Puna de Atacama, and Norte Chico. The vertical extent of the satellite photo is approximately 2,600 km, encompassing the desert and surrounding regions.

Ecology
- Realm: Neotropical
- Biome: Deserts and xeric shrublands
- Borders: Central Andean dry puna; Chilean matorral, Sechura Desert

Geography
- Area: 104,741 km^{2} (40,441 mi^{2})
- Country: Chile
- Coordinates: 24°30′S 69°15′W

Conservation
- Protected: 3,385 km² (3%)

The Atacama Desert (Spanish: Desierto de Atacama [ataˈkama]) is a desert plateau located on the Pacific coast of South America, in the north of Chile. Stretching over a 1,600-kilometre-long (1,000-mile) strip of land west of the Andes Mountains, it covers an area of 105,000 km^{2} (41,000 mi^{2}), which increases to 128,000 km^{2} (49,000 mi^{2}) if the barren lower slopes of the Andes are included.

The Atacama Desert is the driest nonpolar desert in the world, and the second driest overall, behind some specific spots within the McMurdo Dry Valleys. It is the only true desert to receive less precipitation than polar deserts, and the largest fog desert in the world. The area has been used as an experimentation site for Mars expedition simulations due to its similarities to the Martian environment.

The constant temperature inversion caused by the cool north-flowing Humboldt ocean current and the strong Pacific anticyclone contribute to the extreme aridity of the desert. The most arid region of the Atacama Desert is situated between two mountain chains, the Andes and the Chilean Coast Range, which are high enough to prevent moisture advection from either the Pacific or the Atlantic Ocean, creating a two-sided rain shadow effect. These same geographic conditions moderate airflows to produce consistently mild temperatures throughout the desert, with only a few periods of freezing temperatures in winter or very warm days during summer.

== Setting ==
According to the World Wide Fund for Nature, the Atacama Desert ecoregion occupies a continuous strip for nearly 1,600 kilometres (1,000 mi) along the narrow coast of the northern third of Chile, from near Arica (18°24′S) southward to near La Serena (29°55′S). The National Geographic Society considers the coastal area of southern Peru to be part of the Atacama Desert and includes the deserts south of the Ica Region in Peru. However, other sources consider that the part of the desert in Peru is a different ecosystem, and should properly be named as Pampas de la Joya desert.

Peru borders it on the north and the Chilean Matorral ecoregion borders it on the south. To the east lies the less arid Central Andean dry Puna ecoregion. The drier portion of this ecoregion is located south of the Loa River between the parallel Sierra Vicuña Mackenna and the Cordillera Domeyko. To the north of the Loa lies the Pampa del Tamarugal.

The Coastal Cliff of northern Chile west of the Chilean Coast Range is the main topographical feature of the coast. The geomorphology of the Atacama Desert has been characterized as a low-relief bench "similar to a giant uplifted terrace" by Armijo and co-workers. The intermediate depression (or Central Valley) forms a series of endorheic basins in much of the Atacama Desert south of latitude 19°30'S. North of this latitude, the intermediate depression drains into the Pacific Ocean.

In December 2023, scientists, for the first time, reported on a recently discovered area in the territory of Puna de Atacama, which may have similarities to Earth during the Archean eon and thus to the environment of the first life forms on Earth. It could also be similar to conceivably-hospitable conditions on the planet Mars during earlier Martian times.

== Climate ==
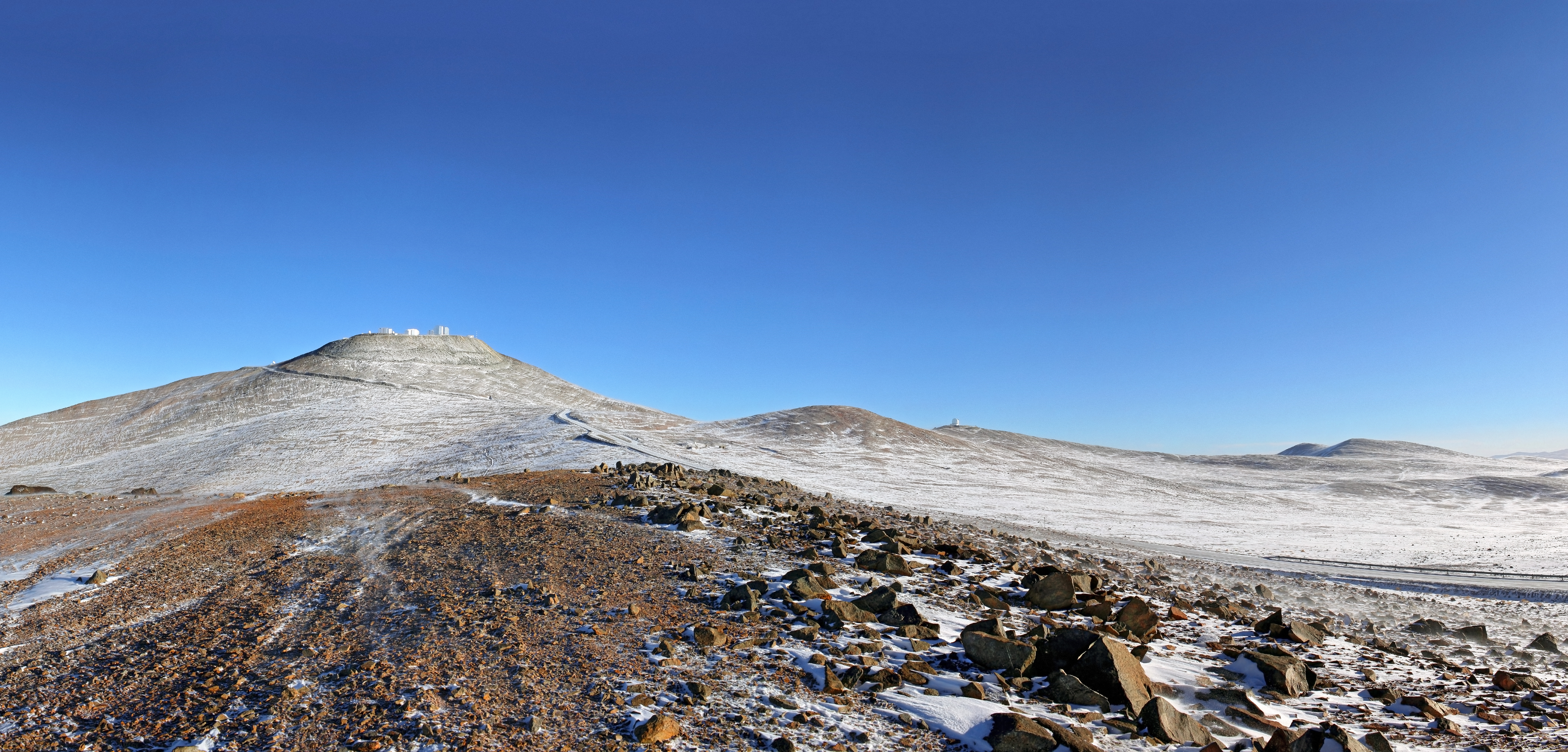
Snow in Paranal Observatory at 2,600 masl

The Atacama has a cold desert climate (in the Köppen climate classification, BWk) with generally mild temperatures year-round and only slight temperature differences across seasons. Rather than the intense heat of many other deserts around the world, the almost total lack of precipitation is the most prominent characteristic of the Atacama Desert.

=== Aridity ===
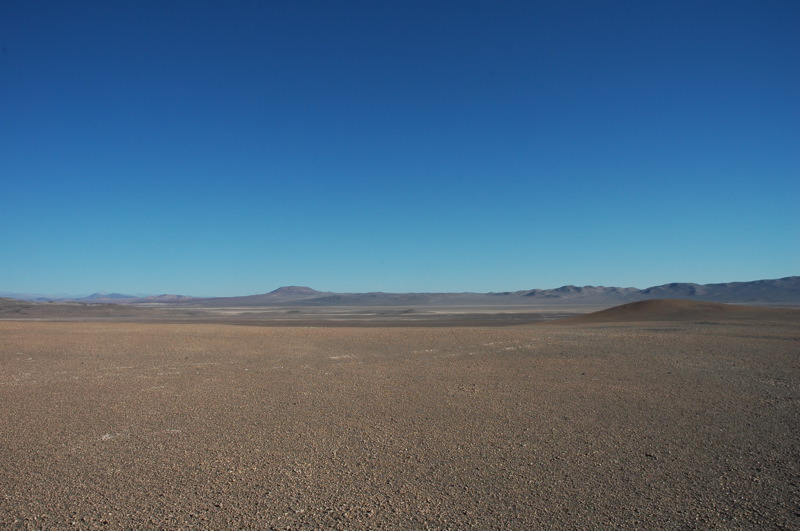
A flat area of the Atacama Desert between Antofagasta and Taltal

The Atacama Desert is commonly known as the driest place in the world, especially the surroundings of the abandoned Yungay mining town, where the University of Antofagasta Desert Research Station is located, in Antofagasta Region, Chile. The average rainfall is about 15 mm (0.6 in) per year, although some locations receive only 1 to 3 mm (0.04 to 0.12 in) in a year. Moreover, some weather stations in the Atacama have never received rain. Periods up to four years have been registered with no rainfall in the central sector, delimited by the cities of Antofagasta, Calama and Copiapó. Evidence suggests that the Atacama may not have had any significant rainfall from 1570 to 1971.

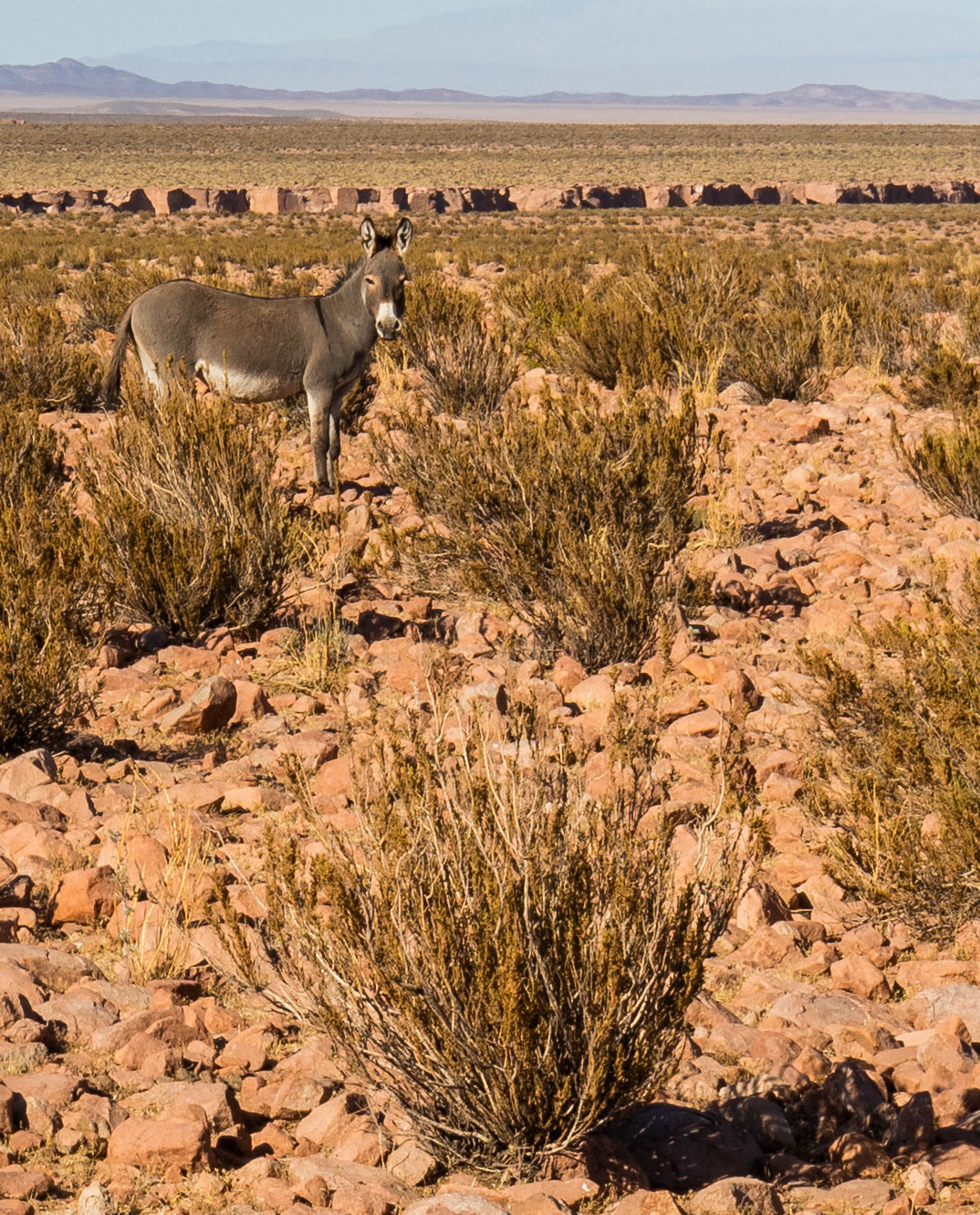
Feral donkey in the Atacama desert

The Atacama Desert may be the oldest desert on earth, and has experienced hyper aridity since at least the Middle Miocene, since the establishment of a proto-Humboldt current in conjunction with the opening of the Tasmania-Antarctic passage ca. 33 million years ago (Ma). The opening of the Tasmania-Antarctic passage allowed for cold currents to move along the west coast of South America, which influenced the availability of warm humid air to travel from the Amazon Basin to the Atacama. Though there was a general lack of humid air after 33 Ma, there were punctuated intervals of increased humidity, such as between around 10.86 and 6.4 Ma, when the Tiliviche Palaeolake existed before turning into a salar sometime before the Middle Pliocene. The long history of aridity raises the possibility that supergene mineralisation, under the appropriate conditions, can form in arid environments, instead of requiring humid conditions. The presence of evaporite formations suggests that in some sections of the Atacama Desert, arid conditions have persisted for the last 200 million years (since the Triassic).

Aridity in Atacama Desert predates the rise of the Central Andes, yet hyper-aridity is generally thought to have resulted from the rise of the Andes. As such it is hypothesised it had climatic conditions akin to the Namib Desert prior to the rise of the mountains.

The Atacama is so arid that many mountains higher than 6,000 m (20,000 ft) are completely free of glaciers. Only the highest peaks (such as Ojos del Salado, Monte Pissis, and – debatably – Llullaillaco) have some permanent snow coverage.

The southern part of the desert, between 25° and 27°S, may have been glacier-free throughout the Quaternary (including during glaciations), though permafrost extends down to an altitude of 4,400 m (14,400 ft) and is continuous above 5,600 m (18,400 ft). Studies by a group of British scientists have suggested that some river beds have been dry for 120,000 years. However, some locations in the Atacama receive a marine fog known locally as the camanchaca, providing sufficient moisture for hypolithic algae, lichens, and even some cacti—the genus Copiapoa is notable among these.

Geographically, the aridity of the Atacama is explained by its being situated between two mountain chains (the Andes and the Chilean Coast Range) of sufficient height to prevent moisture advection from either the Pacific or the Atlantic Oceans, a two-sided rain shadow.

Despite modern views of the Atacama Desert as fully devoid of vegetation, in pre-Columbian and colonial times a large flatland area there known as Pampa del Tamarugal was a woodland, but demand for firewood associated with silver and saltpeter mining in the 18th and 19th centuries resulted in widespread deforestation. (Note: Reforestation efforts begun in 1963 and reforestated areas are protected since 1987 in the Pampa del Tamarugal National Reserve.)

A recent find of a Late Miocene capybara (Cardiatherium) fossil and associated palm tree phytoliths in northern Chile casts doubts on the accepted view of the historical weather conditions in the Atacama desert. The presence of a semiaquatic fossil, dating back to approximately 8.8 Ma, indicates that at that time, Atacama desert possessed a significantly wetter climate characterized by freshwater rivers, coastal wetlands, and palm tree canopies. According to an upcoming publication by Gutstein et al., the finds introduce a critical nuance to hyperarid paleoclimatology, proving that the Atacama's long-term aridity was punctuated by prolonged, ecologically rich humid intervals capable of supporting diverse megafauna.

=== Comparison to Mars ===
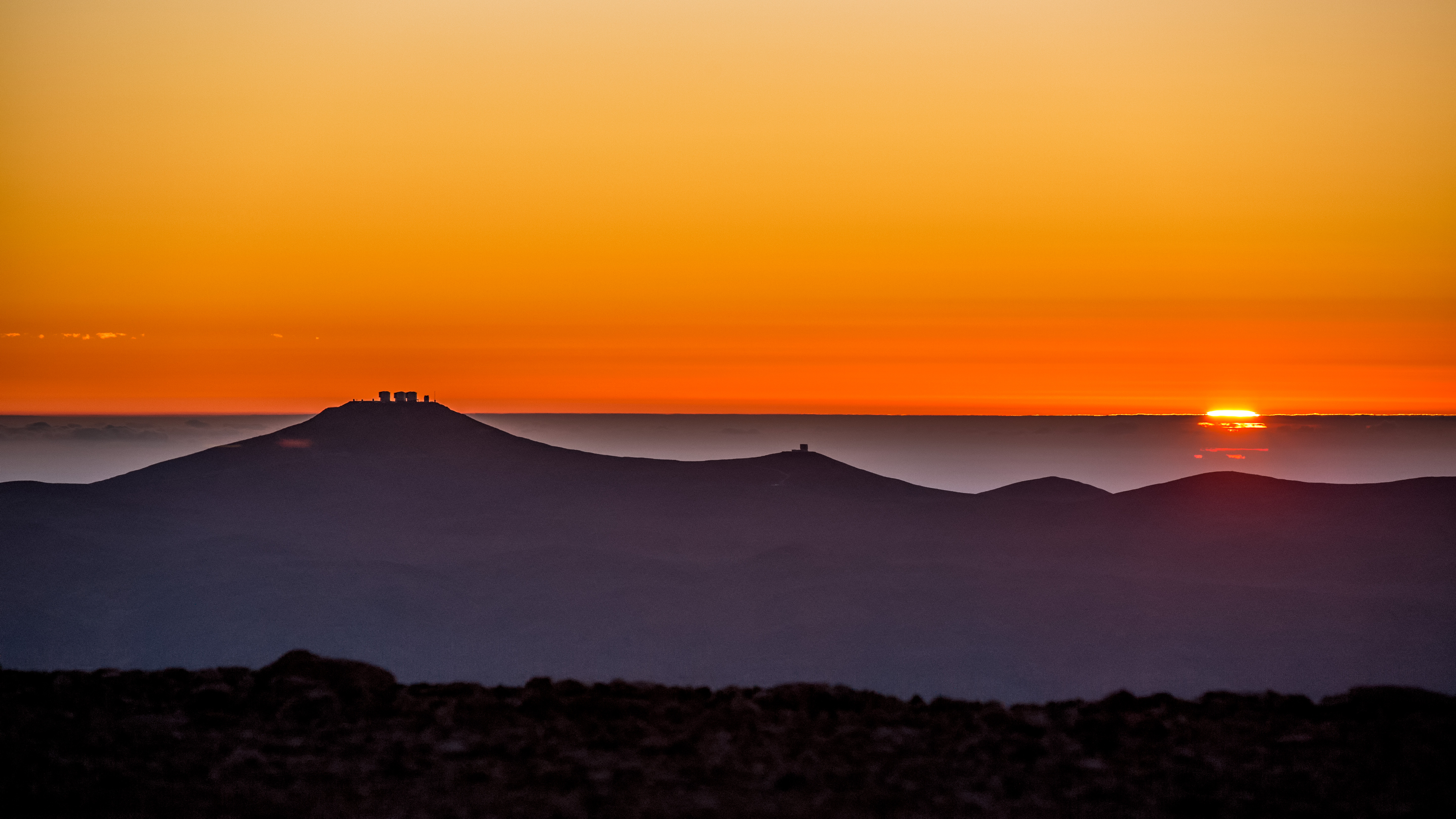
The lack of humidity, rain, and light pollution together produce a dusty, rocky landscape.

In a region about 100 km (60 mi) south of Antofagasta, which averages 3,000 m (10,000 ft) in elevation, the soil has been compared to that of Mars. Owing to its otherworldly appearance, the Atacama has been used as a location for filming Mars scenes, most notably in the 2004 television series Space Odyssey: Voyage to the Planets.

In 2003, a team of researchers published a report in which they duplicated the tests used by the Viking 1 and Viking 2 Mars landers to detect life and were unable to detect any signs in Atacama Desert soil in the region of Yungay. The region may be unique on Earth in this regard and is being used by NASA to test instruments for future Mars missions. The team duplicated the Viking tests in Mars-like Earth environments and found that they missed present signs of life in soil samples from Antarctic dry valleys, the Atacama Desert of Chile and Peru, and other locales. However, in 2014, a new hyperarid site was reported, María Elena South, which was much drier than Yungay and, thus, a better Mars-like environment.

Towards Atacama, near the deserted coast, you see a land without men, where there is not a bird, not a beast, nor a tree, nor any vegetation.

— La Araucana by Alonso de Ercilla, 1569

In 2008, the Phoenix Mars Lander detected perchlorates on the surface of Mars at the same site where water was first discovered. Perchlorates are also found in the Atacama and associated nitrate deposits have contained organics, leading to speculation that signs of life on Mars are not incompatible with perchlorates. The Atacama is also a testing site for the NASA-funded Earth–Mars Cave Detection Program.

On 21 February 2023, scientists reported the findings of a "dark microbiome" of unfamiliar microorganisms in the Atacama Desert.

=== Extreme weather events ===
In June 1991, Antofagasta and Taltal and inland regions as far as Calama received unusual rainfall leading to formation of a series of mudflows that killed 91 people.

In 2012, the altiplano winter brought floods to San Pedro de Atacama.

On 25 March 2015, heavy rainfall affected the southern part of the Atacama Desert. Resulting floods triggered mudflows that affected the cities of Copiapo, Tierra Amarilla, Chanaral and Diego de Almagro, causing the deaths of more than 100 people.

In early 2019, extreme heat and wildfires in Chile resulted in heavy flooding in the Atacama. At least 6 people died and 346 homes were destroyed.

== Flora ==
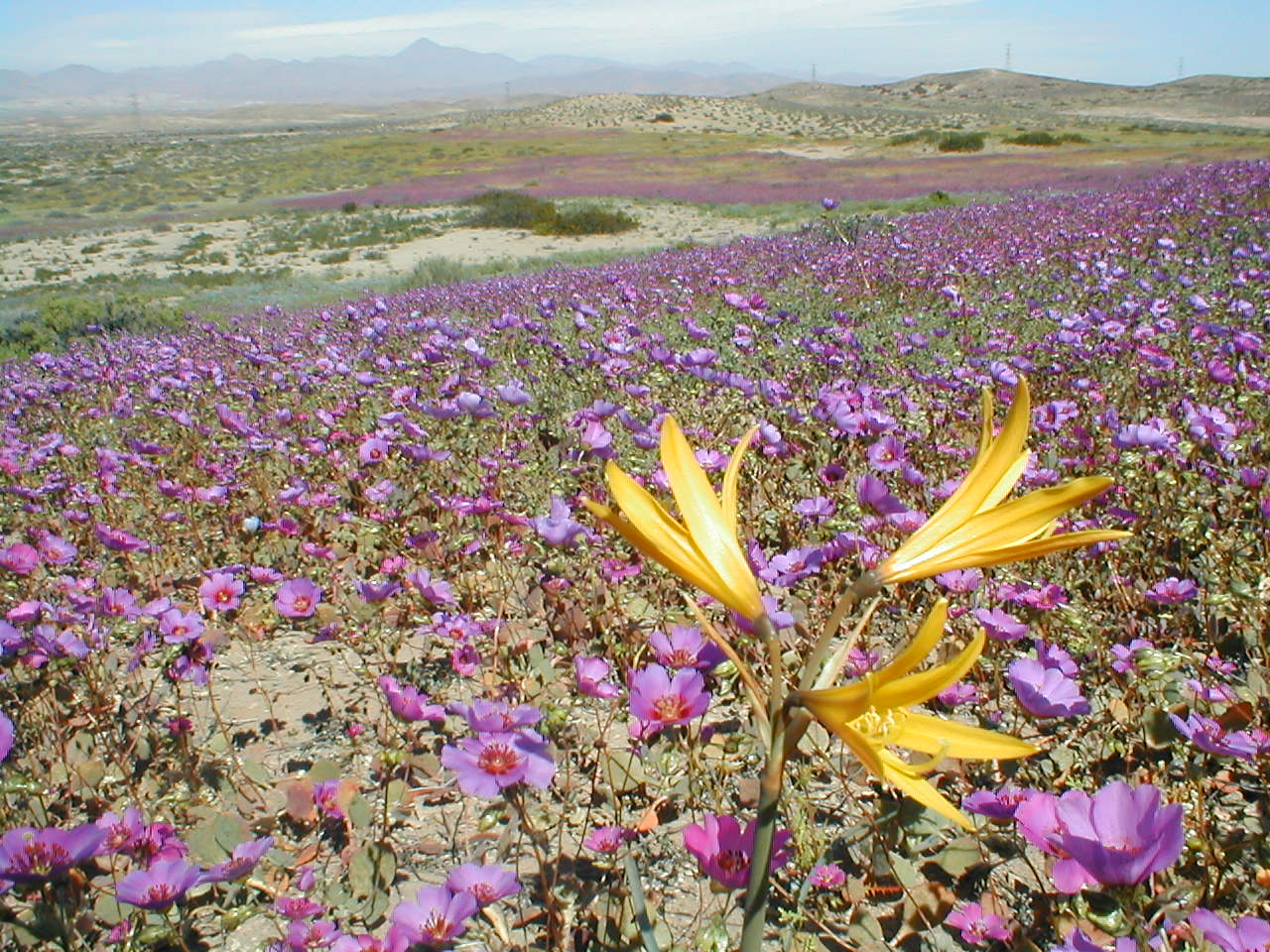
Rare rainfall events cause the flowering desert phenomenon in the southern Atacama Desert.

In spite of the geographic and climatic conditions of the desert, a rich variety of flora has evolved there. Over 500 species have been gathered within the border of this desert. These species are characterized by their extraordinary ability to adapt to this extreme environment. The most common species are herbs and flowers such as thyme, llareta, and saltgrass, and where humidity is sufficient, trees such as the tamarugo (endemic to the atacama), the chañar, the pimiento tree and the leafy algarrobo.

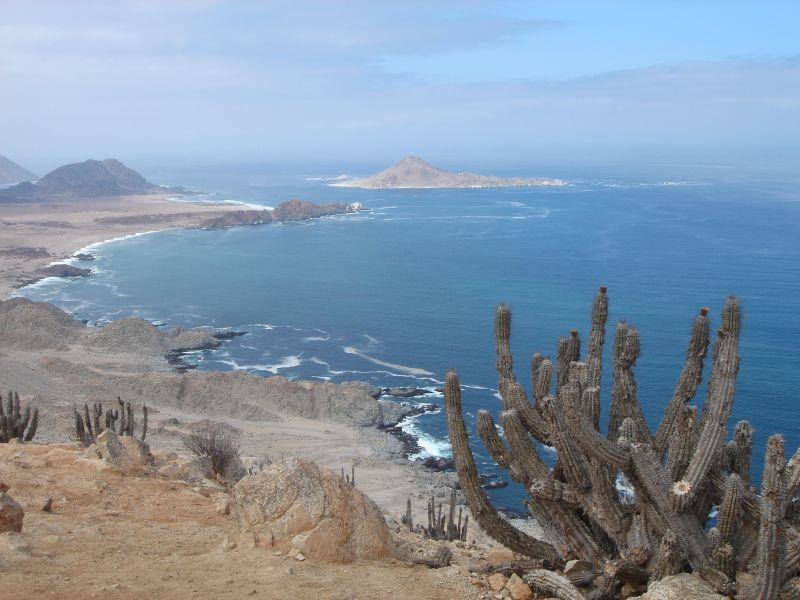
Vegetation in Pan de Azúcar National Park on the coast of the Atacama Desert

The llareta is one of the highest-growing wood species in the world. It is found at altitudes between 3,000 and 5,000 m (9,800 and 16,400 ft). Its dense form is similar to a pillow some 3 to 4 m (9.8 to 13.1 ft) thick. It concentrates and retains the heat from the day to cope with low evening temperatures. The growth rate of the llareta has been recently estimated at 1.5 cm/year (0.59 in/year), making many llaretas over 3,000 years old. It produces a much-prized resin, which the mining industry once harvested indiscriminately as fuel, making this plant endangered.

The desert is also home to cacti, succulents, and other plants that thrive in a dry climate. Cactus species here include the candelabro and cardon, which can reach a height of 7 m (23 ft) and a diameter of 70 cm (28 in).

The Atacama Desert flowering (Spanish: desierto florido) can be seen from September to November in years with sufficient precipitation, as happened in 2015.

== Fauna ==
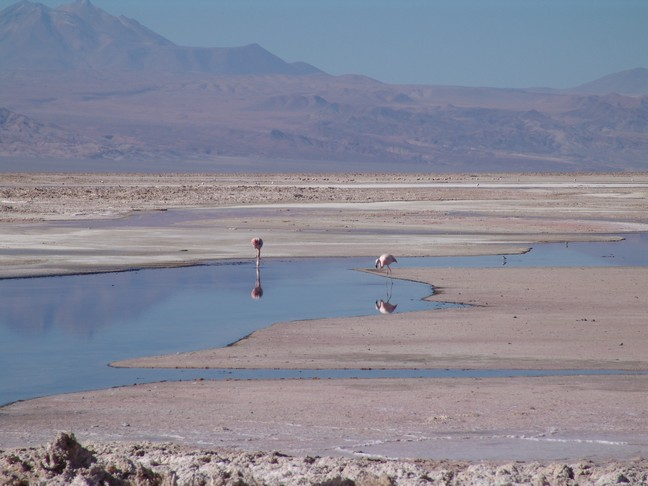
Andean flamingos in Salar de Atacama

The climate of the Atacama Desert limits the number of animals living permanently in this extreme ecosystem. Some parts of the desert are so arid, no plant or animal life can survive. Outside of these extreme areas, sand-colored grasshoppers blend with pebbles on the desert floor, and beetles and their larvae provide a valuable food source in the lomas (hills). Desert wasps and butterflies can be found during the warm and humid season, especially on the lomas. Red scorpions also live in the desert.

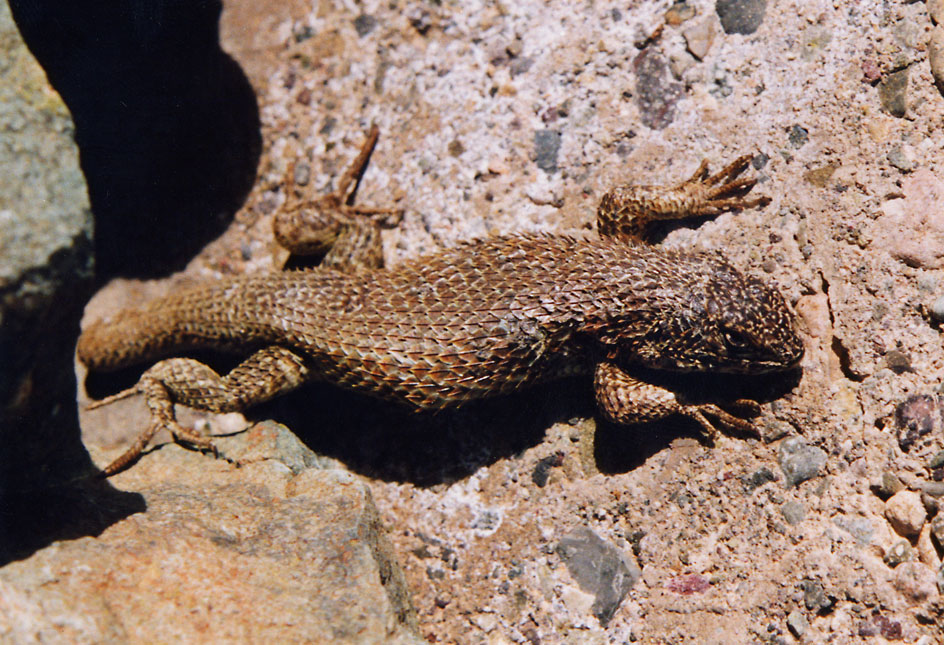
Liolaemus nitidus, a lizard native to the southern reaches of the Atacama Desert

A unique environment is provided by some lomas, where the fog from the ocean provides enough moisture for seasonal plants and a few animal species. Surprisingly few reptile species inhabit the desert and even fewer amphibian species. The Vallenar toad (also called the Atacama toad), lives on the lomas, where it lays eggs in permanent ponds or streams. Iguanas and lava lizards inhabit parts of the desert, while salt flat lizards, Liolaemus, live in the dry areas bordering the ocean. One species, Liolaemus fabiani, is endemic to the Salar de Atacama, the Atacama salt flat.

Birds are one of the most diverse animal groups in the Atacama. Humboldt penguins live year-round along the coast, nesting in desert cliffs overlooking the ocean. Inland, high-altitude salt flats are inhabited by Andean flamingos, while Chilean flamingos can be seen along the coast. Other birds (including species of hummingbirds and rufous-collared sparrow) visit the lomas seasonally to feed on insects, nectar, seeds, and flowers. The lomas help sustain several threatened species, such as the endangered Chilean woodstar.

Because of the desert's extreme aridity, only a few specially adapted mammal species live in the Atacama, such as Darwin's leaf-eared mouse. The less arid parts of the desert are inhabited by the South American gray fox and the viscacha (a relative of the chinchilla). Larger animals, such as guanacos and vicuñas, graze in areas where grass grows, mainly because it is seasonally irrigated by melted snow. Vicuñas need to remain near a steady water supply, while guanacos can roam into more arid areas and survive longer without fresh water. South American fur seals and South American sea lions often gather along the coast.

== Human presence ==
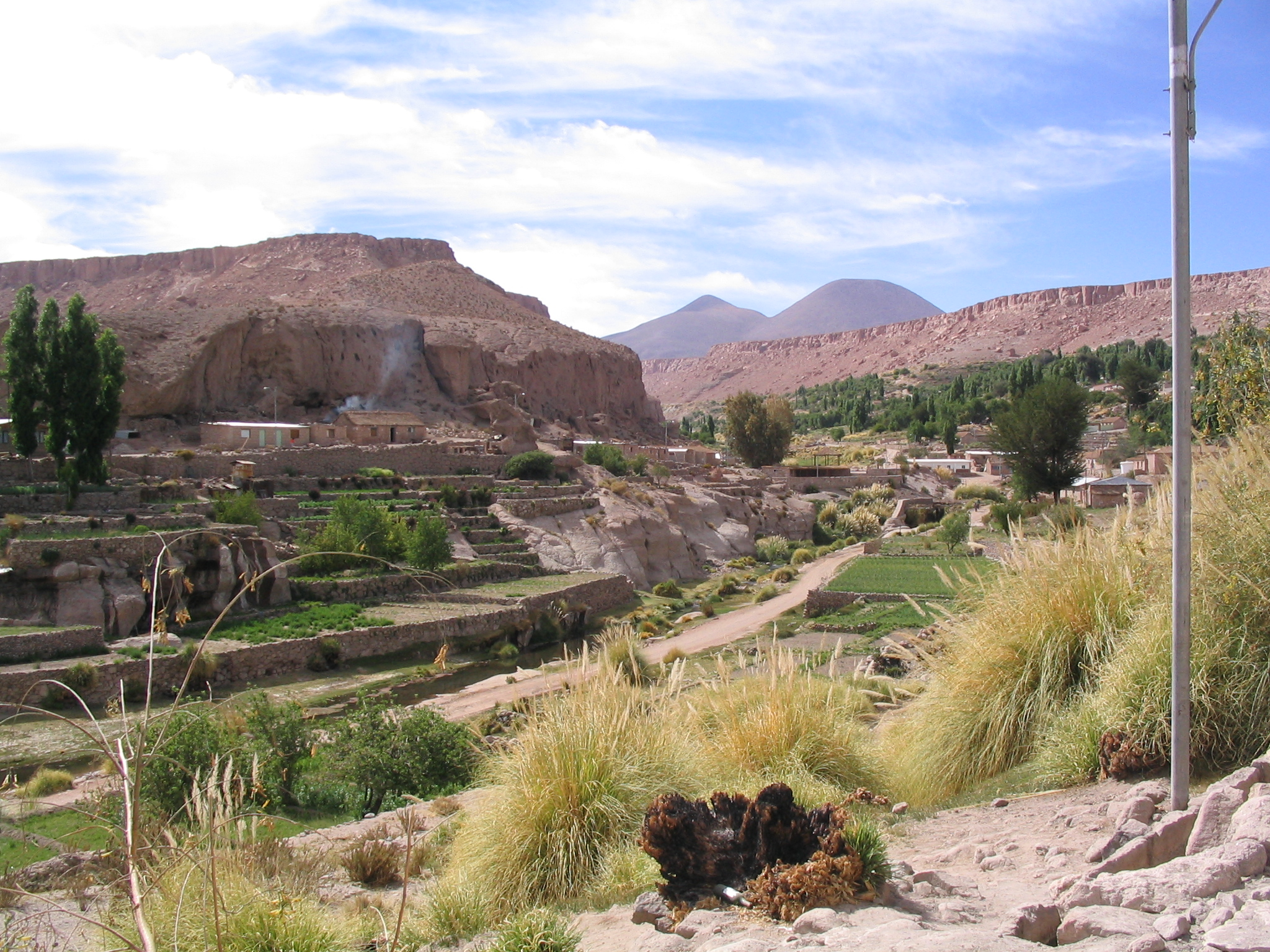
View of Caspana, a village and Likan Antai settlement in the interior Atacama Desert

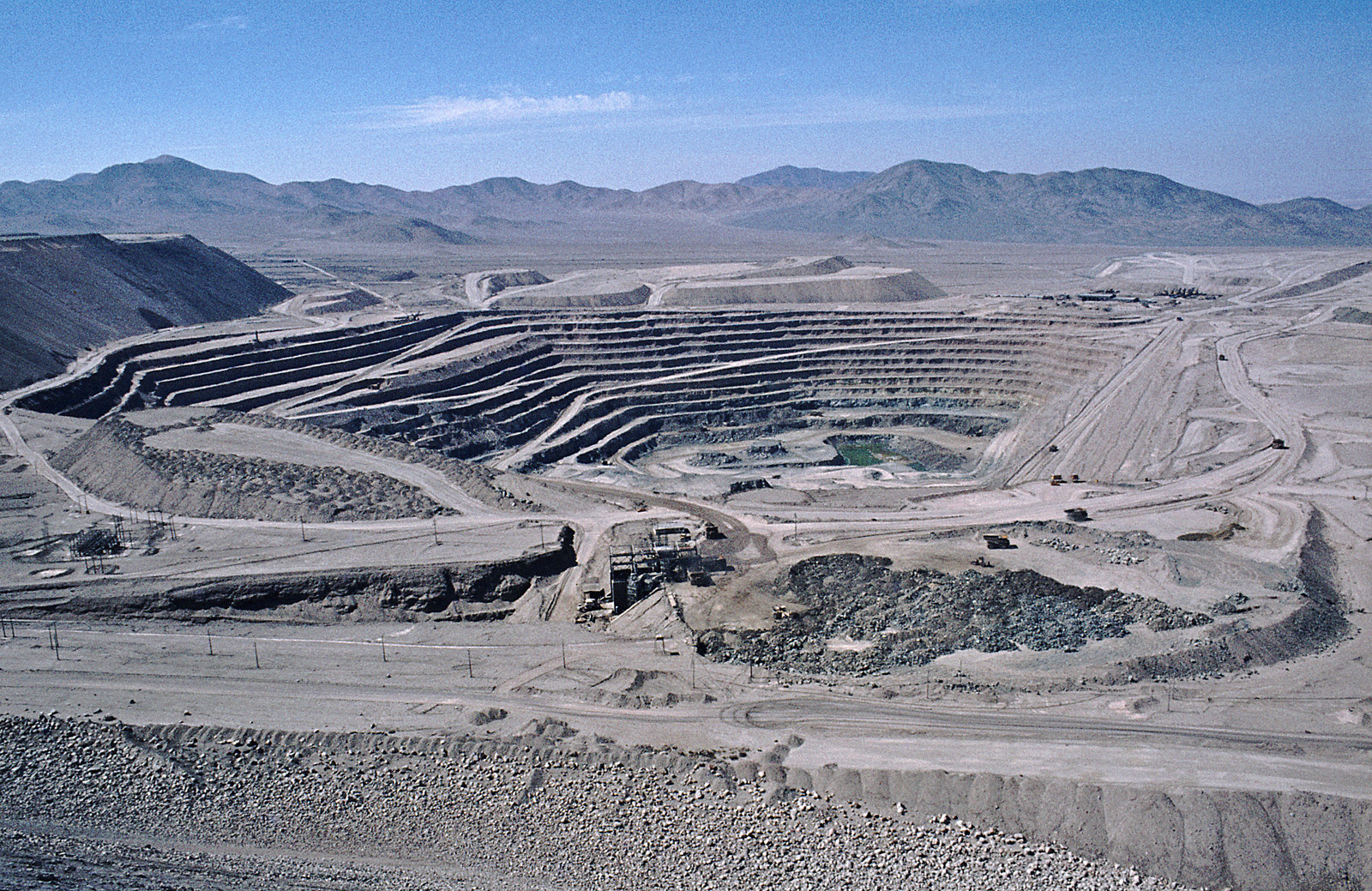
View of Chuquicamata, a large, state-owned copper mine

The Atacama is sparsely populated, with most towns located along the Pacific coast. In interior areas, oases and some valleys have been populated for millennia and were the location of the most advanced pre-Columbian societies found in Chile.

=== Chinchorro culture ===
The Chinchorro culture developed in the Atacama Desert area from 7000 BCE to 1500 BCE. These peoples were sedentary fishermen inhabiting mostly coastal areas. Their presence is found from today's towns of Ilo, in southern Peru, to Antofagasta in northern Chile. Presence of fresh water in the arid region on the coast facilitated human settlement in these areas. The Chinchorro were famous for their detailed mummification and funerary practices.

=== Inca and Spanish empires ===
San Pedro de Atacama, at about 2,400 m (8,000 ft) elevation, is like many of the small towns. Before the Inca Empire and prior to the arrival of the Spanish, the extremely arid interior was inhabited primarily by the Atacameño tribe. They are noted for building fortified towns called pucarás, one of which is located a few kilometers from San Pedro de Atacama. The town's church was built by the Spanish in 1577.

The Atacameño were an extinct Indigenous South American culture, different from the Aymara to the north and the Diaguita to the south.

The oasis settlement of Pica has Pre-Hispanic origins and served as an important stopover for transit between the coast and the Altiplano during the time of the Inca Empire.

During the Inca Empire Moyos Moyos, whose tentative homeland lies in Tarija Valley, were settled in the desert as part of a population transfer scheme.

The coastal cities originated in the 16th, 17th, and 18th centuries during the time of the Spanish Empire, when they emerged as shipping ports for silver produced in Potosí and other mining centers. At the end of the 18th century, Carlos IV defines the southern border of the Viceroyalty of Peru at the port of Nuestra Señora del Paposo.

=== Republican period ===
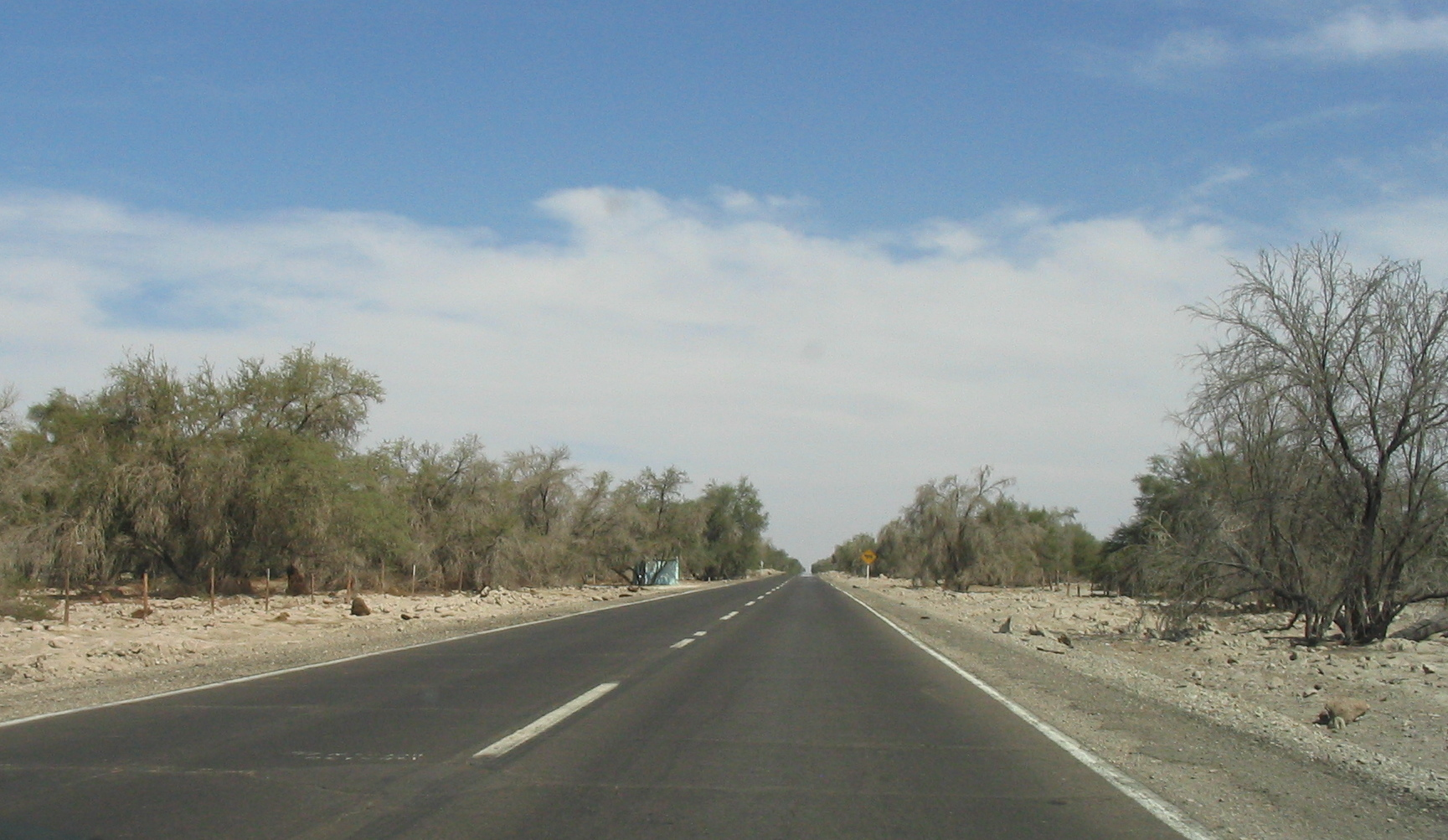
View of a forest in Pampa del Tamarugal from Chile Route 5. These forests were once devastated by the demand of firewood associated with saltpeter mining.

During the 19th century, the desert came under control of Bolivia, Chile and Peru. With the discovery of sodium nitrate deposits and as a result of Chilean expansion plans, the area soon became a zone of conflict and resulted in the War of the Pacific. Chile annexed most of the desert, and cities along the coast developed into international ports, hosting many Chilean workers who migrated there.

With the guano and saltpeter booms of the 19th century, the population grew immensely, mostly as a result of immigration from central Chile. In the 20th century, the nitrate industry declined and at the same time, the largely male population of the desert became increasingly problematic for the Chilean state. Miners and mining companies came into conflict, and protests spread throughout the region.

Around 1900, there were irrigation system of puquios spread through the oases of Atacama Desert. Puquios are known from the valleys of Azapa and Sibaya and the oases of La Calera, Pica-Matilla and Puquio de Núñez. In 1918, geologist Juan Brüggen mentioned the existence of 23 socavones (shafts) in the Pica oasis, yet these have since been abandoned due to economic and social changes.

=== Abandoned nitrate mining towns ===
The desert has rich deposits of copper and other minerals and the world's largest natural supply of sodium nitrate, which was mined on a large scale until the early 1940s. The Atacama border dispute over these resources between Chile and Bolivia began in the 19th century and resulted in the War of the Pacific.

The desert is littered with about 170 abandoned nitrate mining towns, almost all of which were shut down following the invention of synthetic nitrate in Germany in the first decade of the 20th century (see Haber process). The towns include Chacabuco, Humberstone, Santa Laura, Pedro de Valdivia, Puelma, María Elena, and Oficina Anita.

The Atacama Desert is rich in metallic mineral resources such as copper, gold, silver and iron, as well as nonmetallic minerals including important deposits of boron, lithium, sodium nitrate, and potassium salts. The Salar de Atacama is where bischofite is extracted. The Atacama Desert is also the world's largest source of iodine-bearing minerals, with some areas having iodine concentrations hundreds of times larger than the average levels in Earth's crust. These resources are exploited by various mining companies such as Codelco, Lomas Bayas, Mantos Blancos, and Soquimich.

=== Pollution ===
In recent years, large amounts of used clothing imported from overseas have begun to accumulate in portions of the desert. The desert is estimated to receive around 39,000 tonnes of illegally dumped used clothing each year, according to the highest available estimates. Because of the dry conditions, they do not decompose at the normal rate, and fires have exposed nearby residents to air pollution.

==== Textile Dumping ====
Chile is the fourth-largest importer of second-hand clothing in the world, with about 123,000 tonnes of used clothing entering the country each year. More than 90% of textiles that arrive and are sold in Chile are imported. The clothes generally arrive at the port of Iquique, where it gets sorted, mostly by migrant workers. These workers sort the bundles out between better quality items, which are often resold and sometimes sent back to the United States, and lower quality items. Clothing that is too low in quality, or is simply unusable, is taken to a section of the dessert called Alto Hospicio, where it gets dumped or burned. Local landfills refuse to accept these clothes, since they do not break down easily and contain a lot of chemicals.

In 2025, the Environmental Ministry in Chile, decided to add textiles to its Extended Producer Responsibility law. Previously, this law had covered products like tires, batteries, and the plastic wrapping around goods. Now that textiles are a part of it, clothing producers are required to report what they bring into the country. By doing this, the Ministry aims to make producers take responsibility for the waste they are creating.

Researcher Emma Minerva Brambilla, uses her research to argue that the gaps in Chile's waste policies, along with free trade agreements that actively limit the country's ability to increase the restrictions on imports, have allowed the dumping not only to continue, but to increase. She also notes that the estimated 60,000 waste pickers in Chile, most of whom are women, do most of the country's recycling work, whether that is sorting or returning, while not being formally recognized as workers and lacking labor protections. Brambilla recommends stricter and stronger producer responsibility laws, a clearer definition of "waste," and the formal recognition of formal workers in the Atacama Dessert.

== Astronomical observatories ==
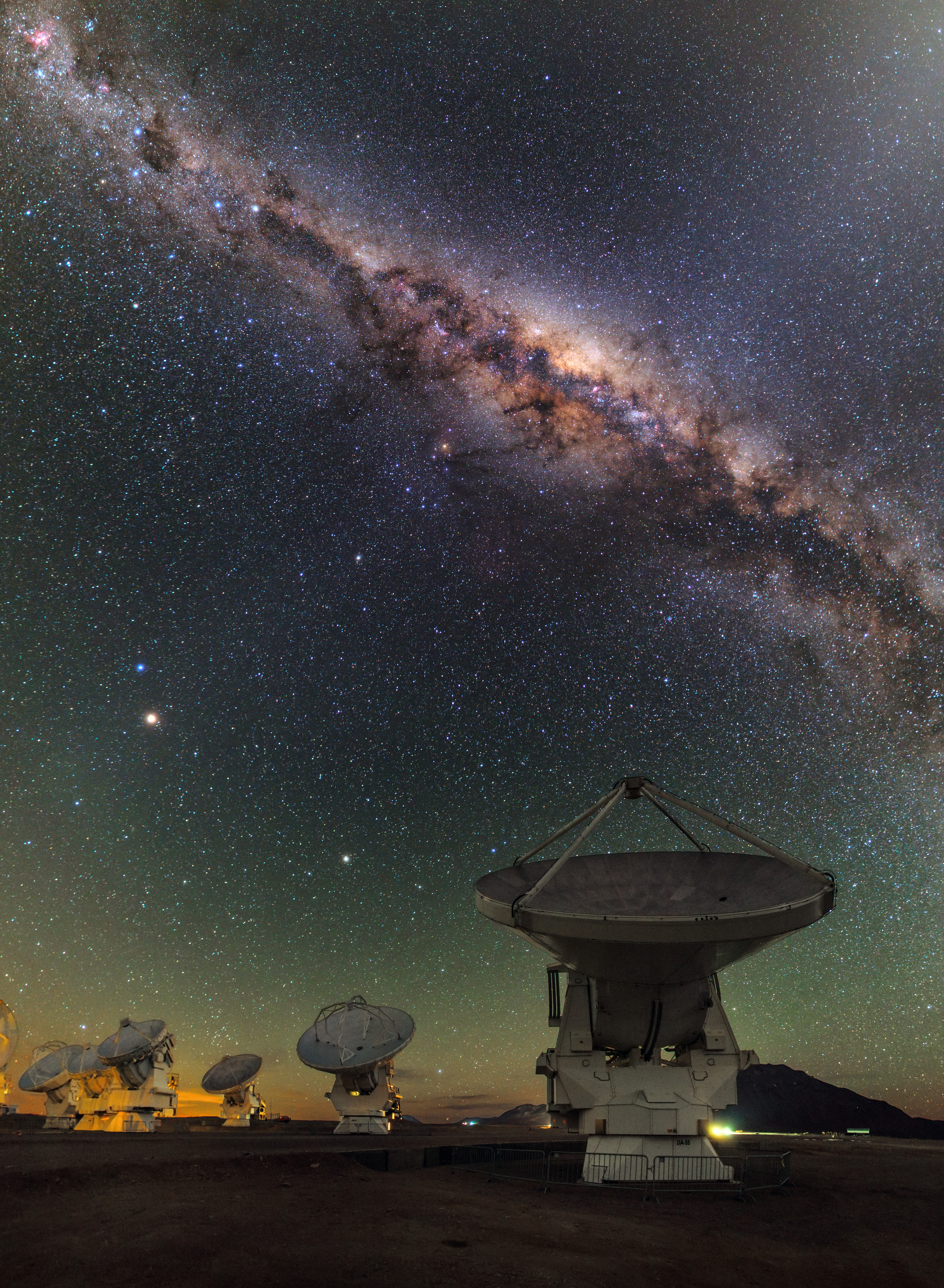
ALMA and the center of the Milky Way

Because of its high altitude, nearly nonexistent cloud cover, dry air, and freedom from light pollution and radio interference from widely populated cities and towns, this desert is one of the best places in the world to conduct astronomical observations. Hundreds of thousands of stars can be viewed via telescope since the desert experiences more than 200 cloudless nights each year. A number of telescopes have been installed to help astronomers from across the globe study the universe. A radio astronomy telescope, called the Atacama Large Millimeter Array, built by European countries, Japan, the United States, Canada, and Chile in the Llano de Chajnantor Observatory officially opened on 3 October 2011. A number of radio astronomy projects, such as the CBI, the ASTE and the ACT, among others, have been operating in the Chajnantor area since 1999. On 26 April 2010, the ESO council decided to build a fourth site, Cerro Armazones, to be home to the Extremely Large Telescope. Construction work at the ELT site started in June 2014. The Carnegie Institution for Science operates the Las Campanas Observatory with several telescopes in the southern portion of the desert.

The European Southern Observatory operates three major observatories in the Atacama and is building a fourth:

- La Silla Observatory
- Paranal Observatory, which includes the Very Large Telescope (VLT)
- Llano de Chajnantor Observatory, which hosts the ALMA international radio observatory
- Cerro Armazones Observatory, site of the future Extremely Large Telescope (ELT)
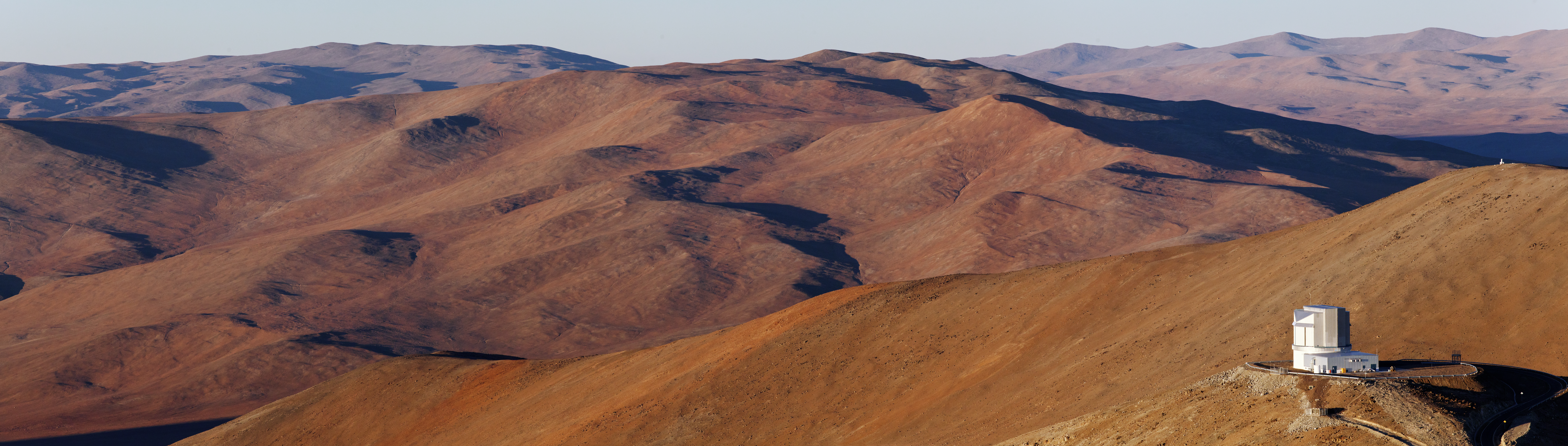
VISTA telescope (Visible and Infrared Survey Telescope for Astronomy), located on a neighbouring peak near the Paranal summit

== Other uses ==
=== Sports ===
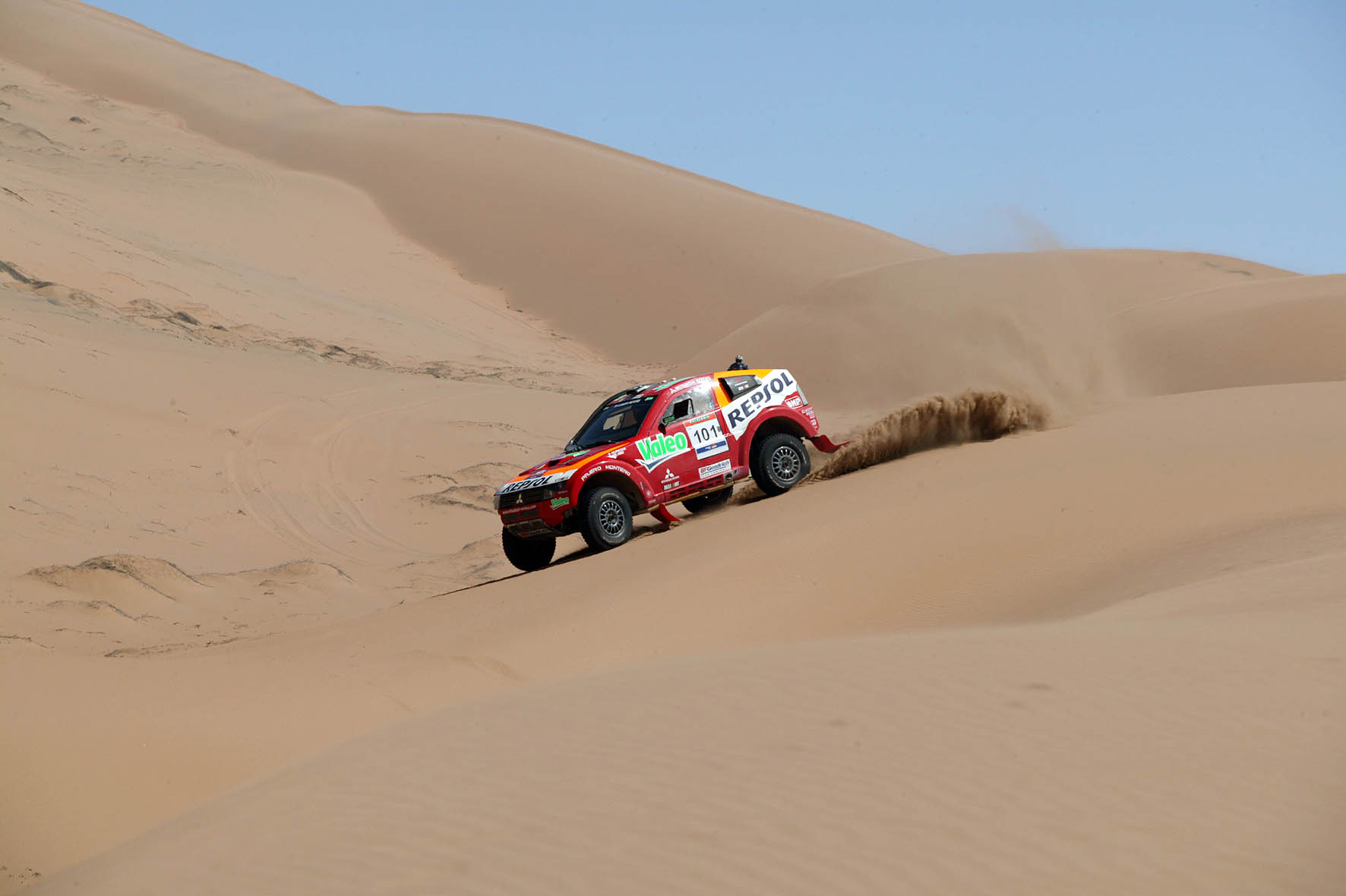
Patagonia-Atacama Rally in 2007

The Atacama Desert is popular with all-terrain sports enthusiasts. Various championships have taken place here, including the Lower Atacama Rally, Lower Chile Rally, Patagonia-Atacama Rally, and the latter Dakar Rally's editions. The rally was organized by the Amaury Sport Organisation and held in 2009, 2010, 2011, and 2012. The dunes of the desert are ideal rally races located in the outskirts of the city of Copiapó. The 2013 Dakar 15-Day Rally started on 5 January in Lima, Peru, through Chile, Argentina and back to Chile finishing in Santiago. Visitors also use the Atacama Desert sand dunes for sandboarding (Spanish: duna).

A week-long foot race called the Atacama Crossing has the competitors cross the various landscapes of the Atacama.

An event called Volcano Marathon takes place near the Lascar volcano in the Atacama Desert.

=== Solar car racing ===
Eighteen solar powered cars were displayed in front of the presidential palace (La Moneda) in Santiago in November 2012. The cars were then raced 1,300 km (810 mi) through the desert from 15 to 19 November 2012.

=== Tourism ===
Most people who go to tour the sites in the desert stay in the town of San Pedro de Atacama. The Atacama Desert is in the top three tourist locations in Chile. The specially commissioned ESO hotel is reserved for astronomers and scientists.

=== Storage battery ===
Since 2024 the Spanish company Grenergy is building the "Oasis de Atacama" storage battery from photovoltaic energy. It has a capacity of about 2 GW solar together with 11 gigawatt hours (GWh) of storage.

Grenergy has an agreement with BYD for the supply of large-scale storage systems for a total capacity of 3GWh for Oasis de Atacama.

== El Tatio Geyser ==
About 80 geysers occur in a valley about 80 km from the town of San Pedro de Atacama, close to the town of Chiu Chiu.

== Termas Baños de Puritama ==
The Baños de Puritama are rock pools which are 60 kilometres (37 miles) from the geysers.

== Gallery ==
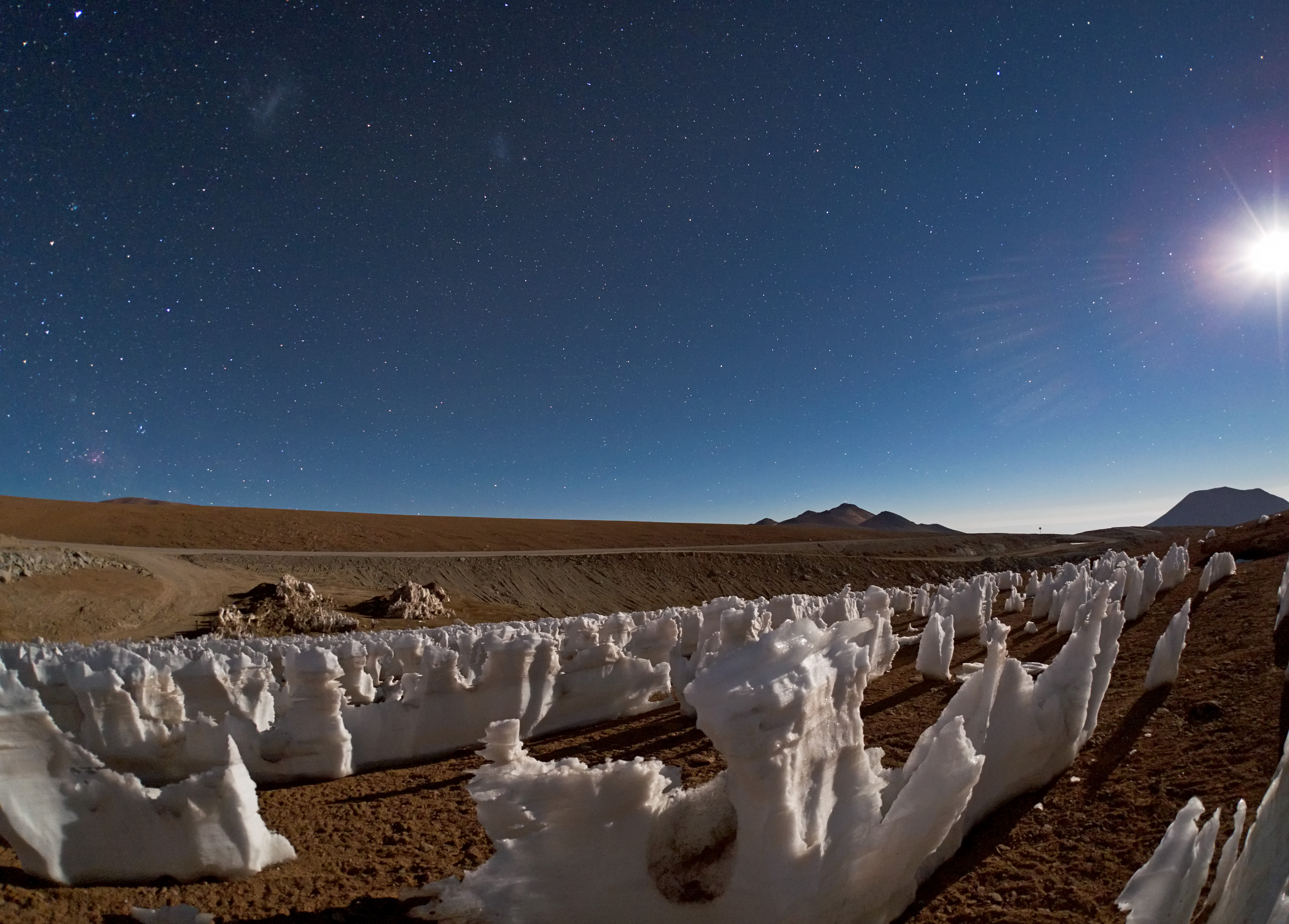
Icy Penitentes by moonlight

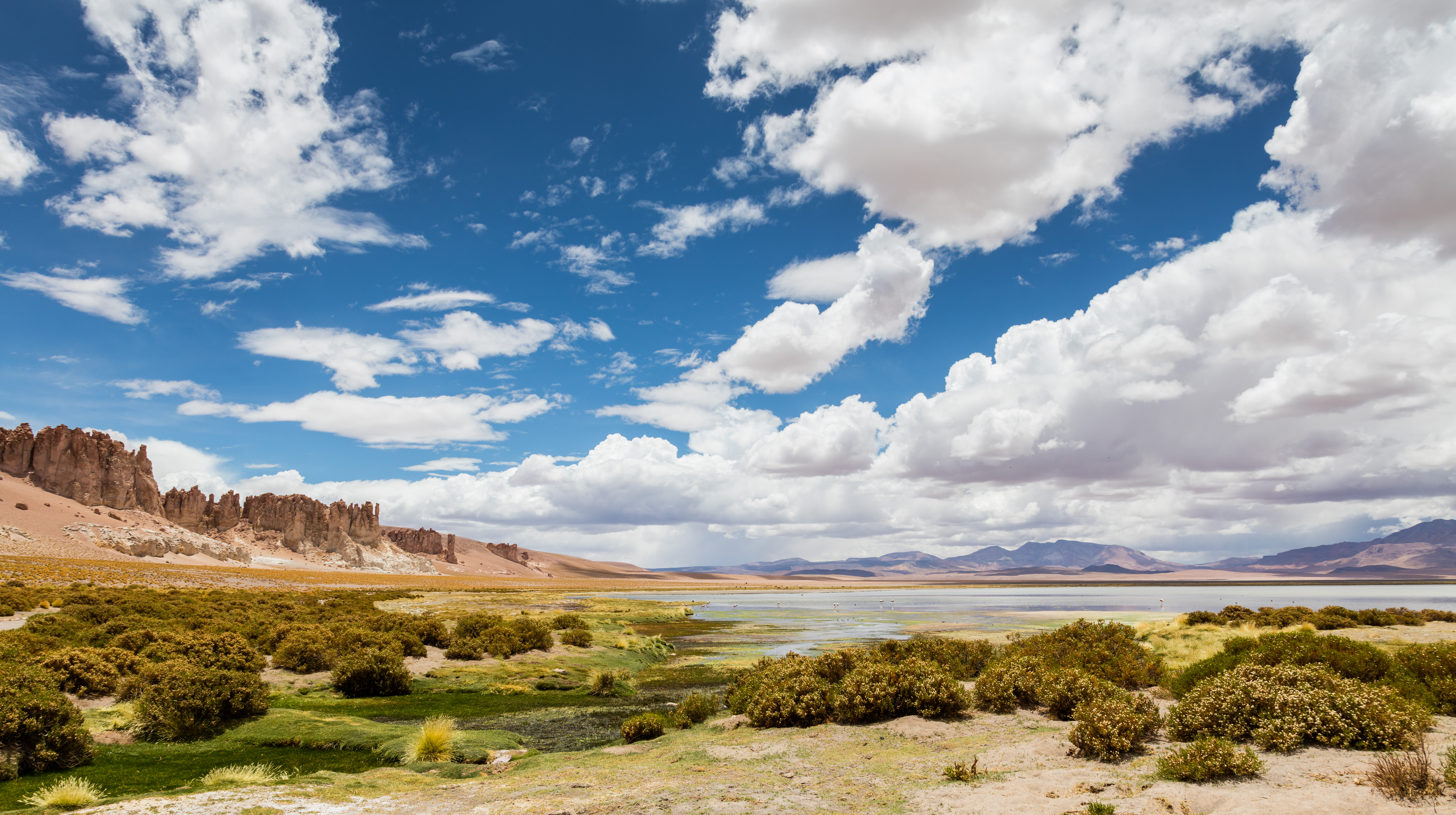
Tara Cathedrals (left) and Tara salt flat

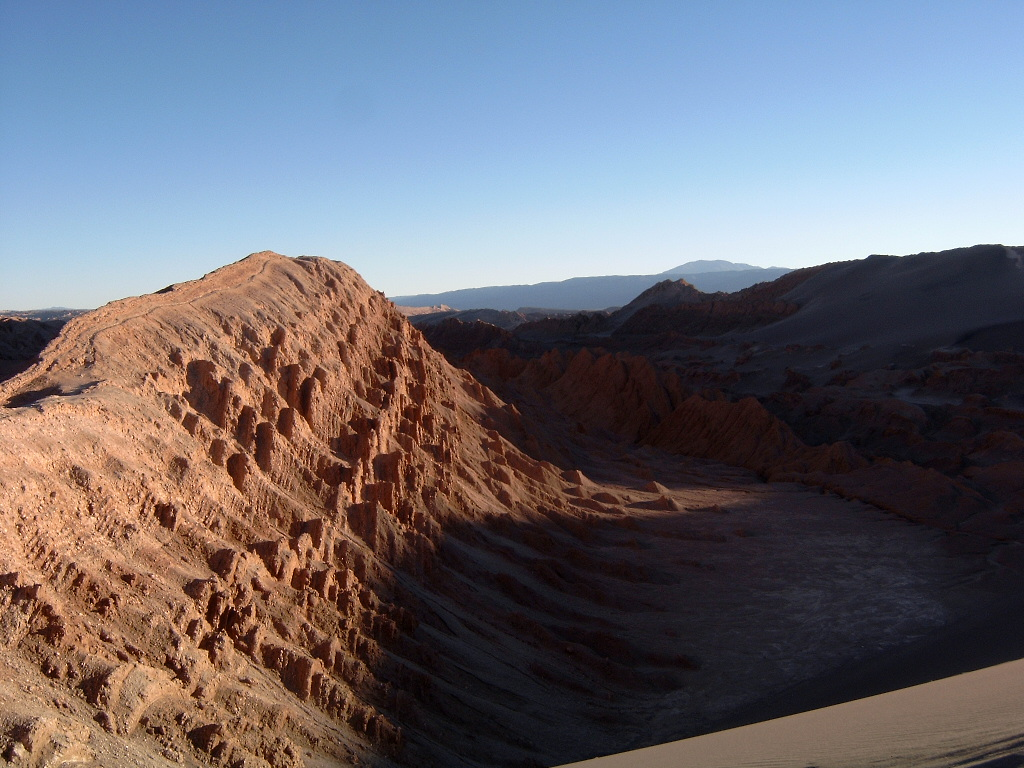
Valle de la Luna, near San Pedro de Atacama

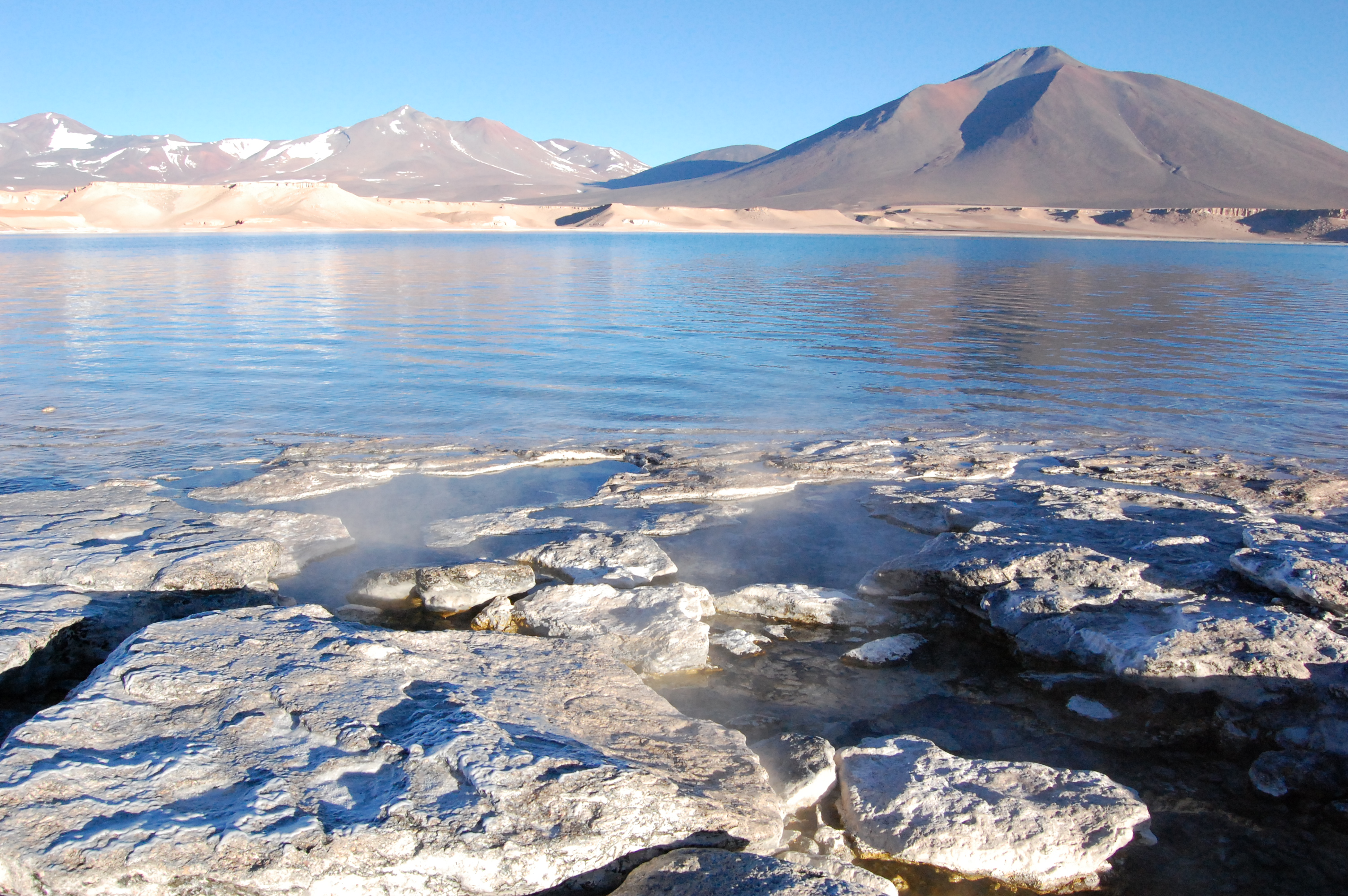
Laguna Verde

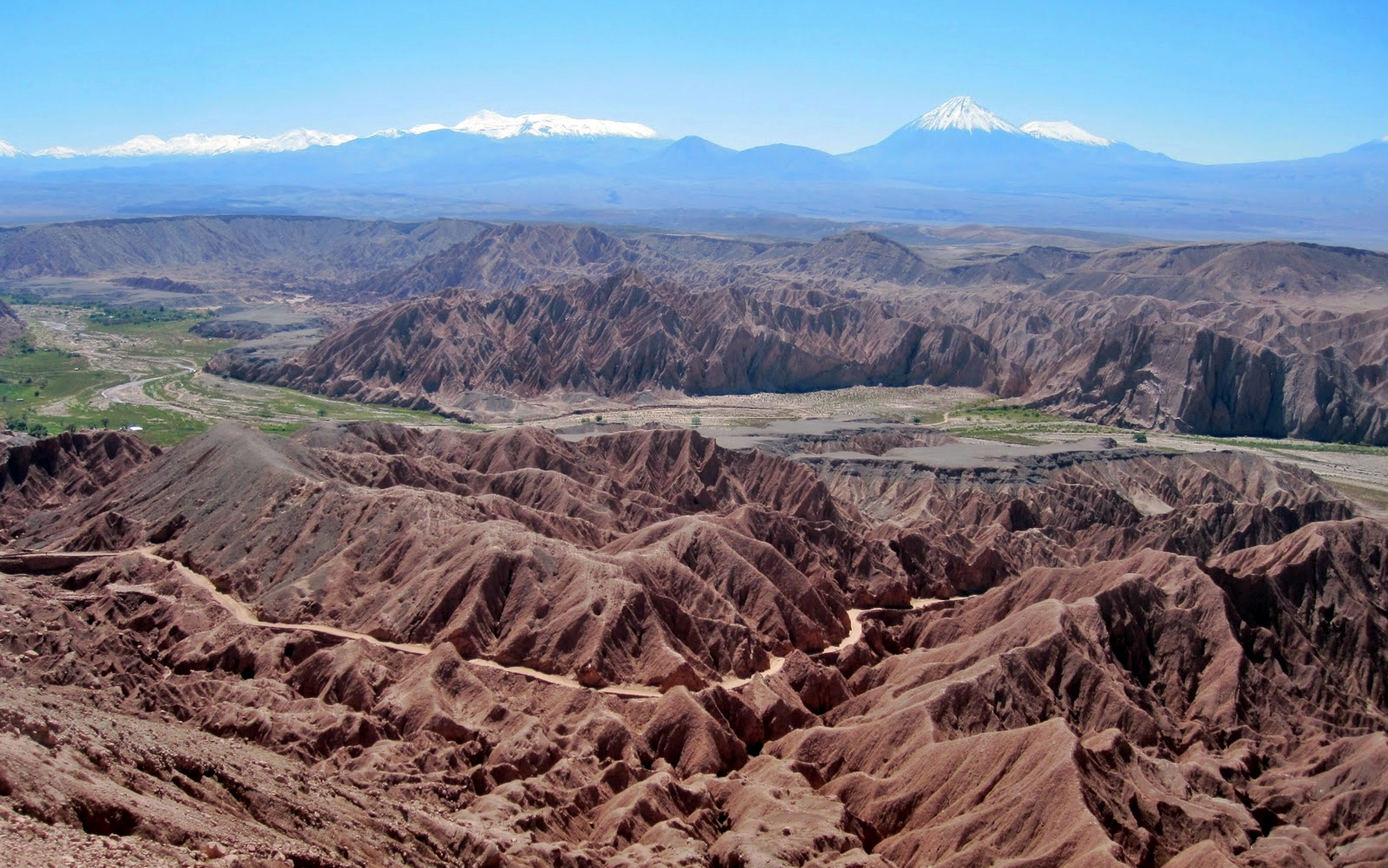
Valley in Atacama

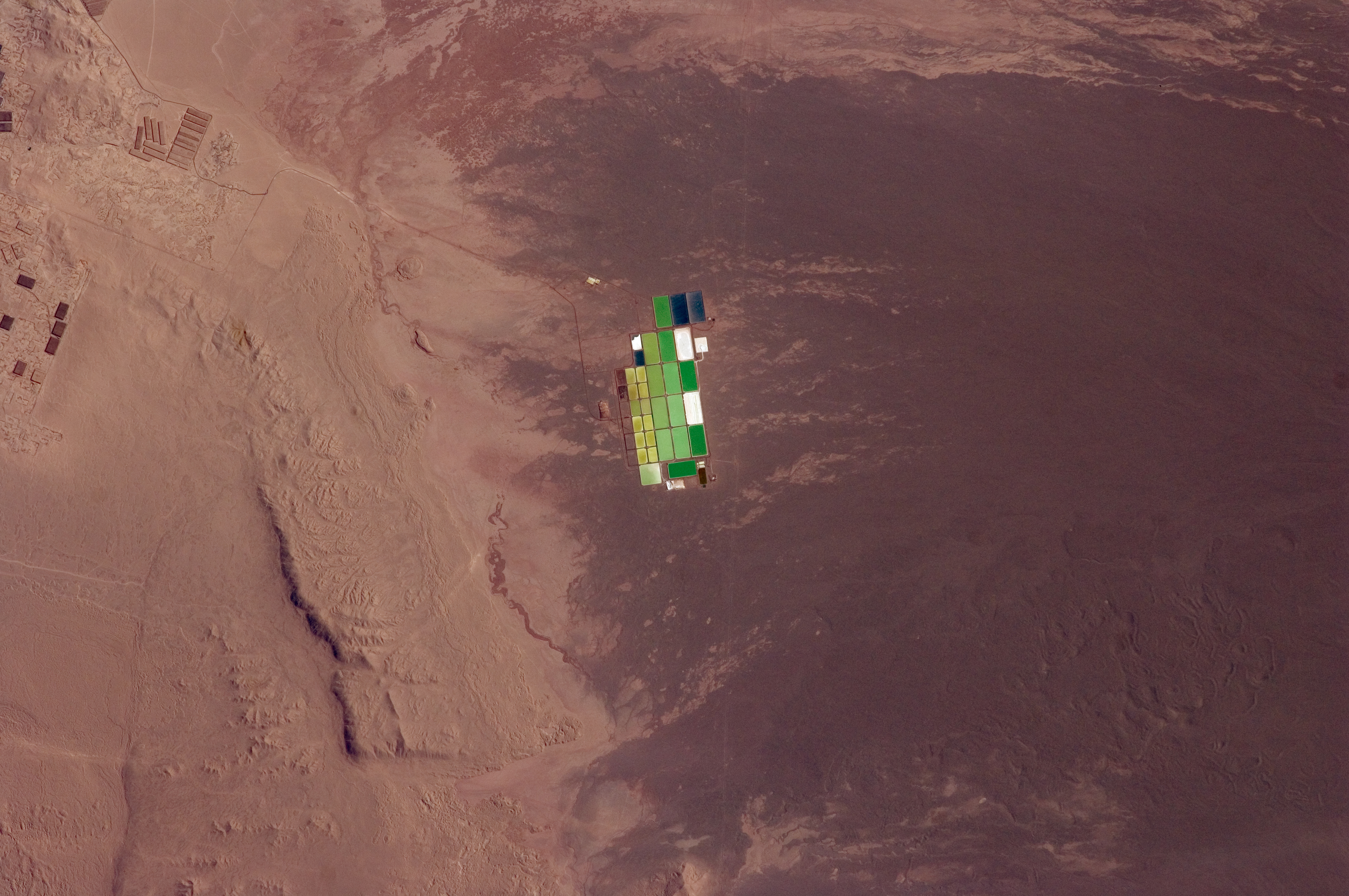
Salt evaporation ponds in the Atacama Desert

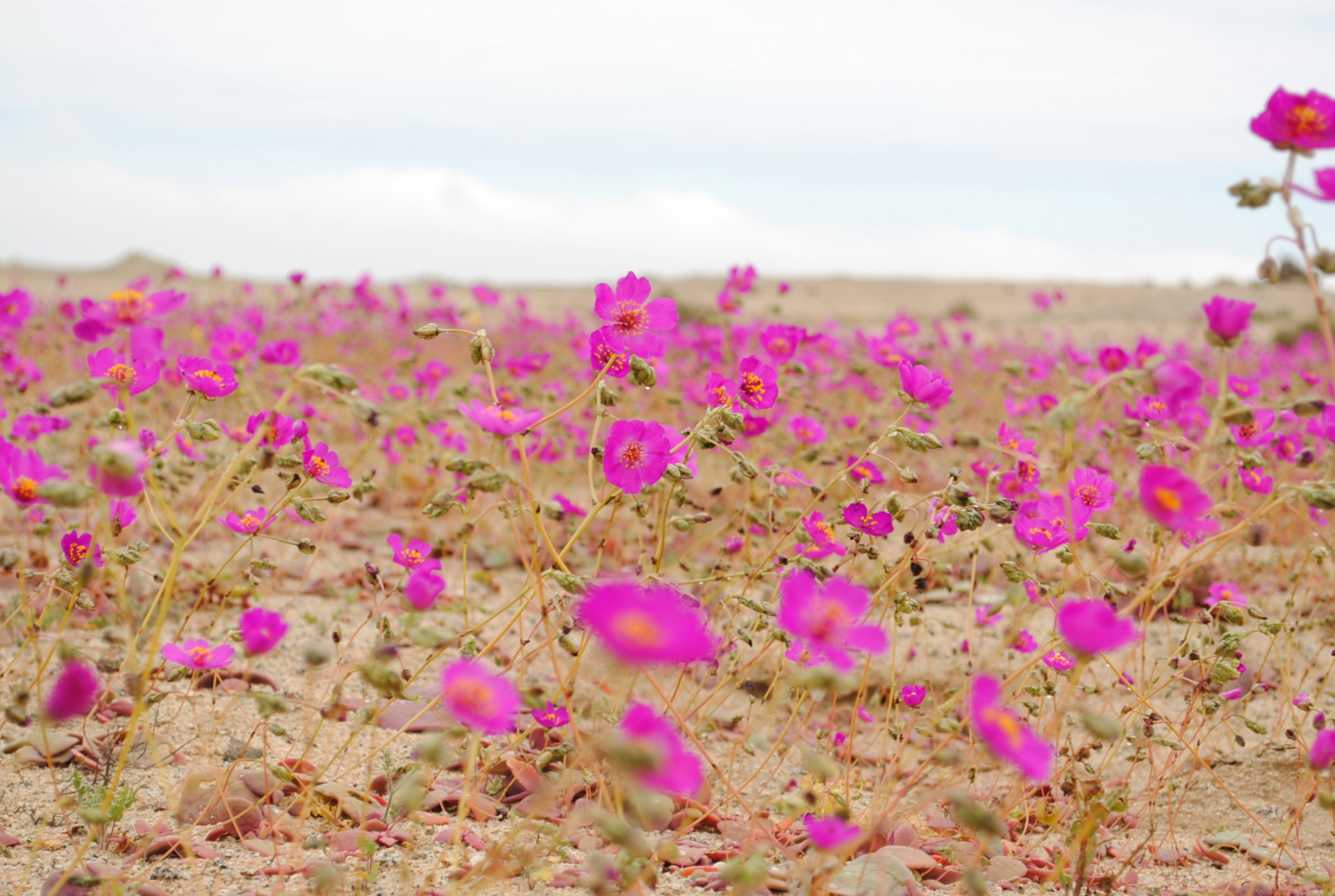
Desert bloom (desierto florido)

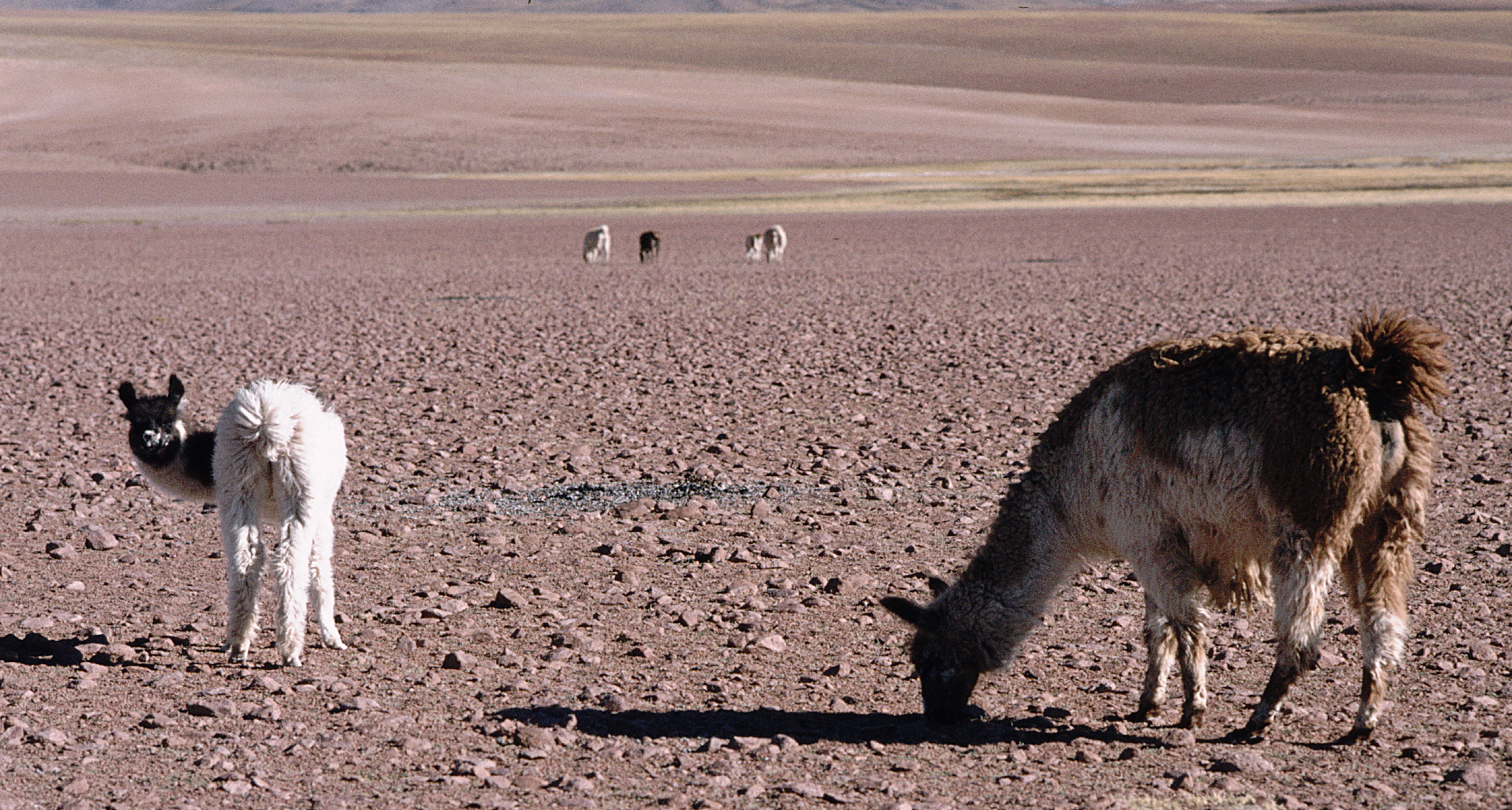
Llamas

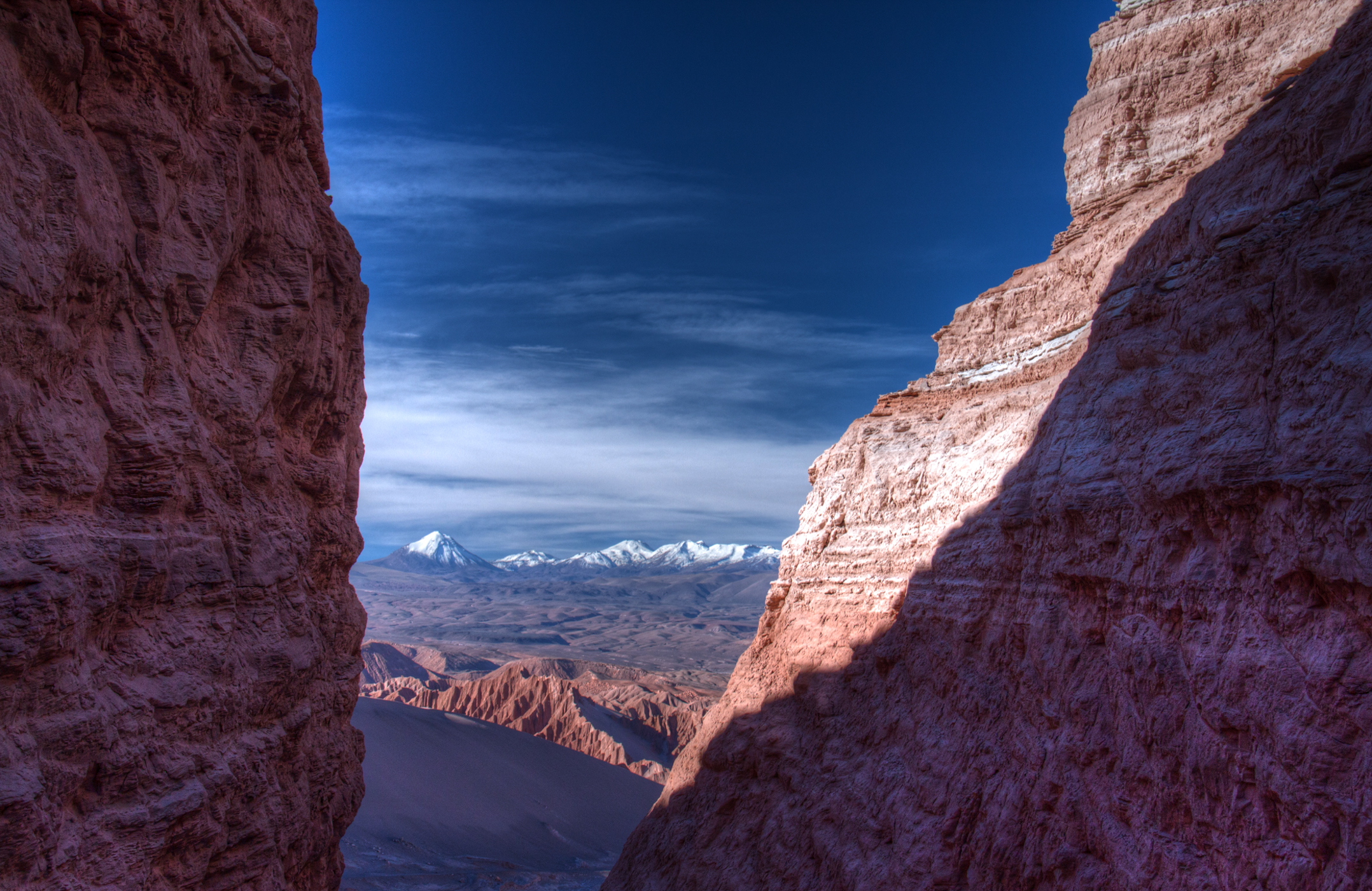
Valley of Death

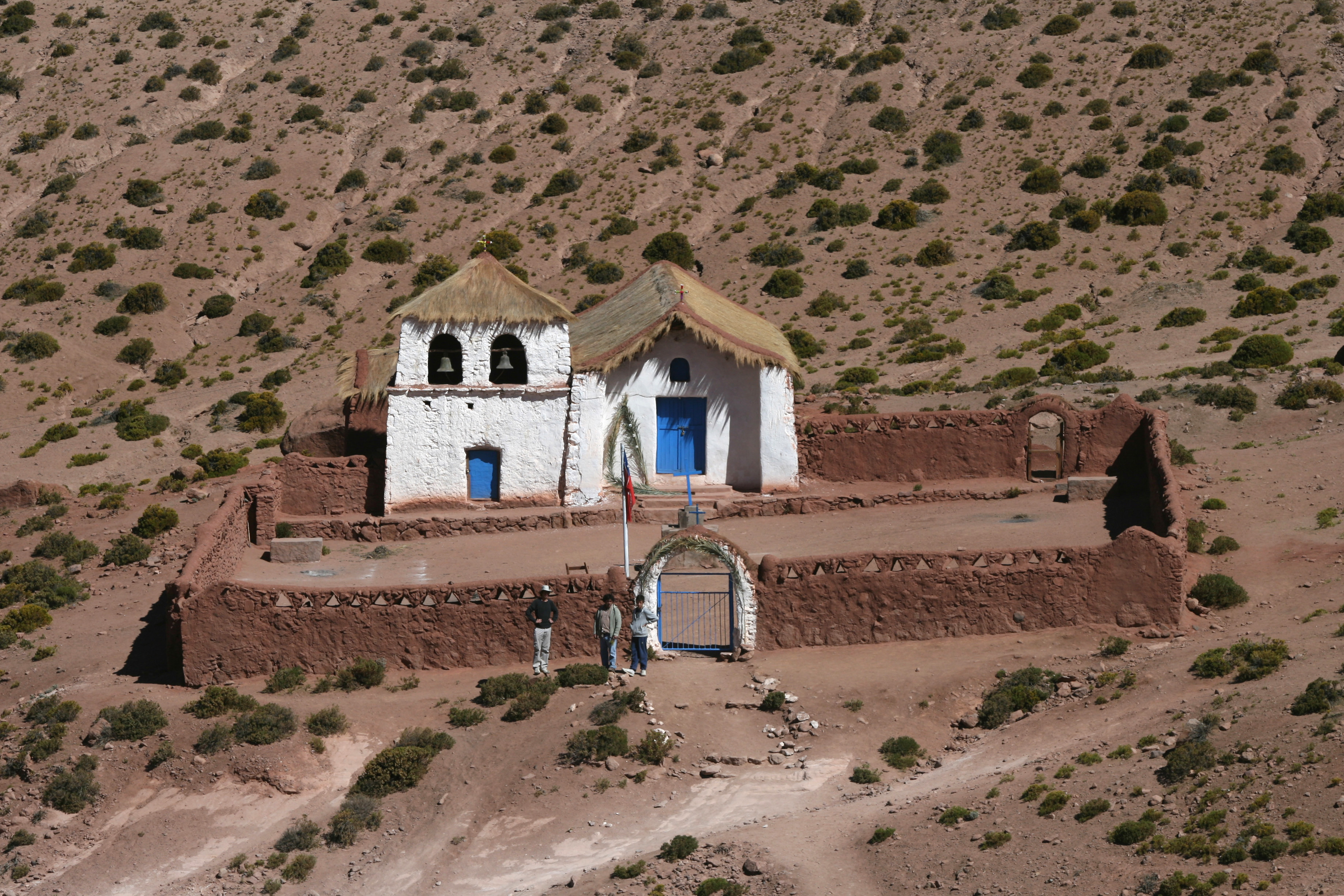
Machuca chapel

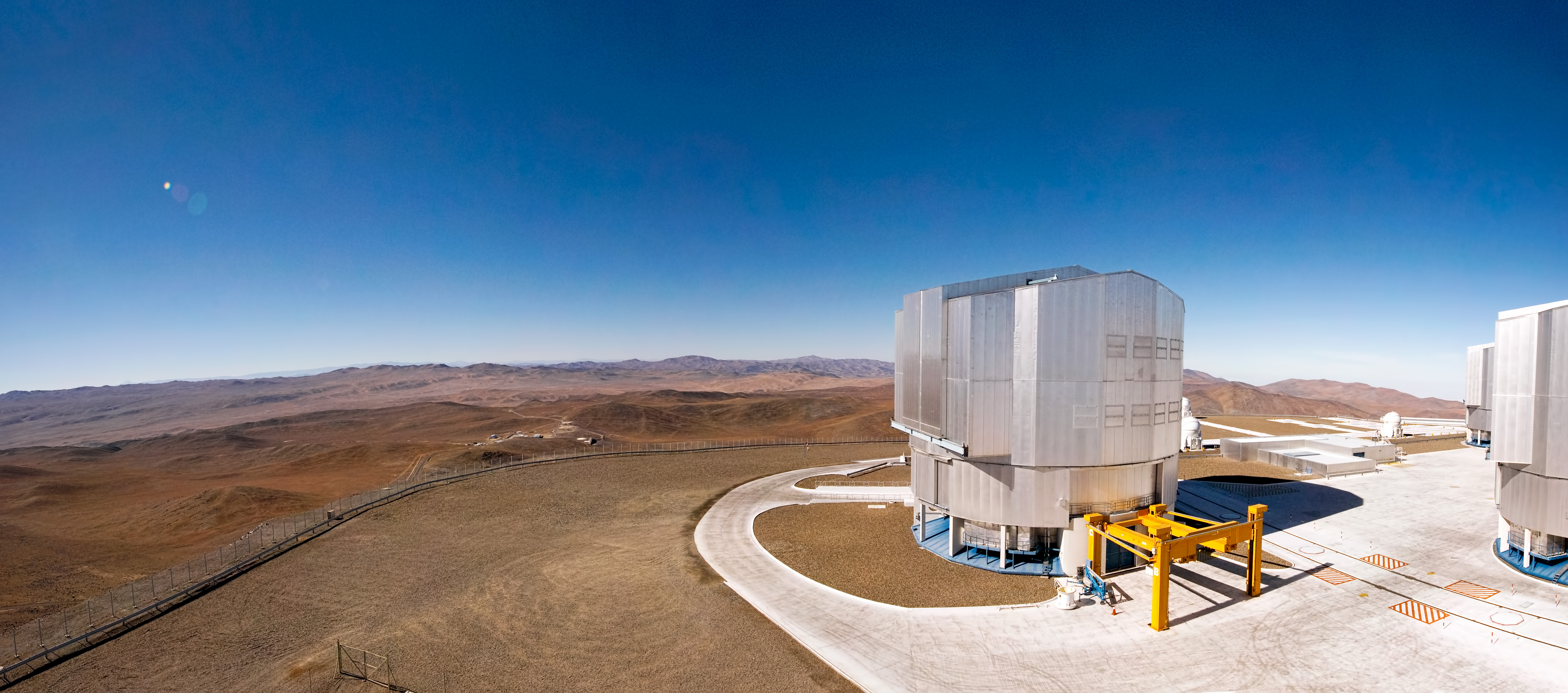
Paranal Observatory

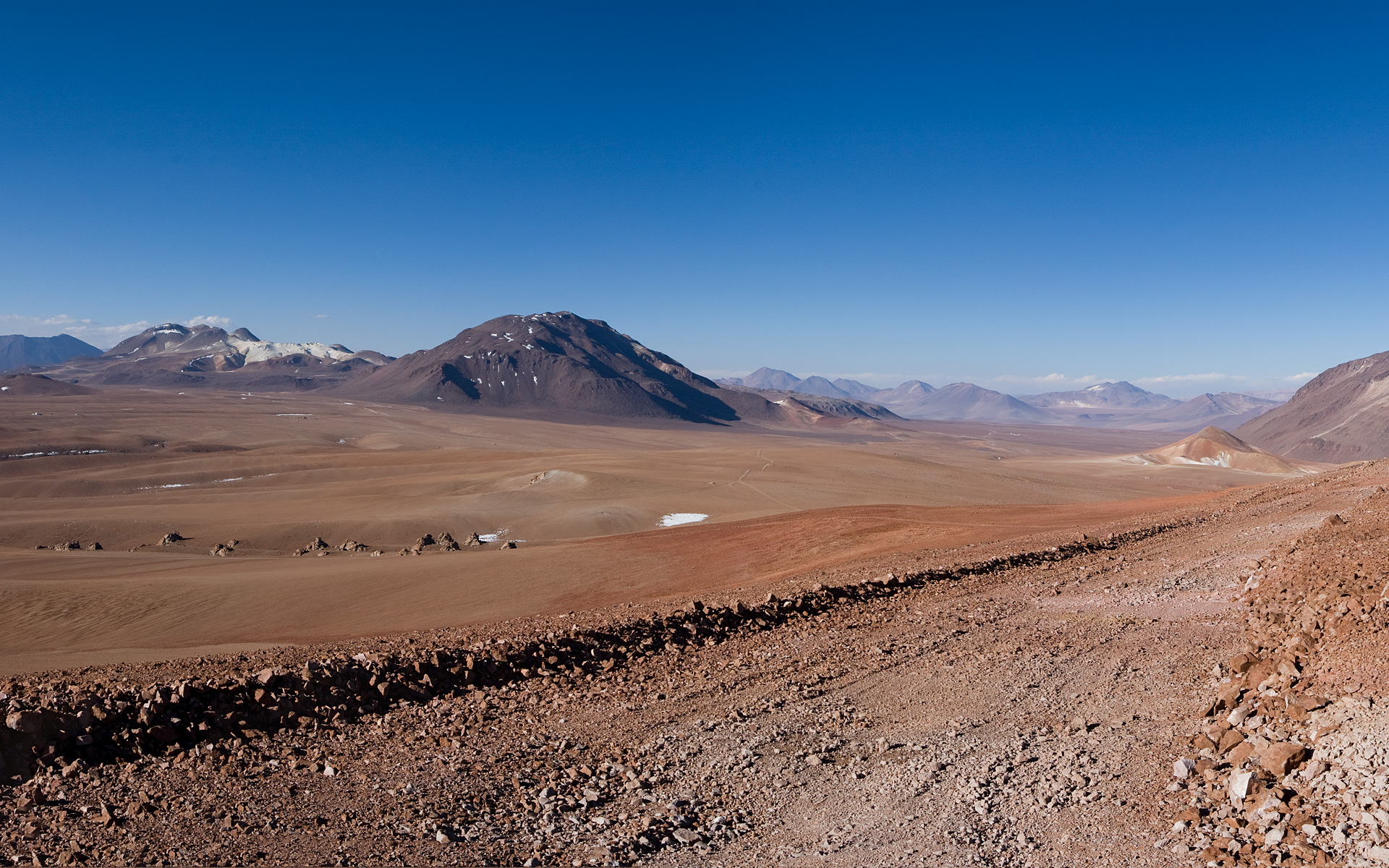
Chajnantor Plateau in the Chilean Andes, home to the ESO/NAOJ/NRAO ALMA

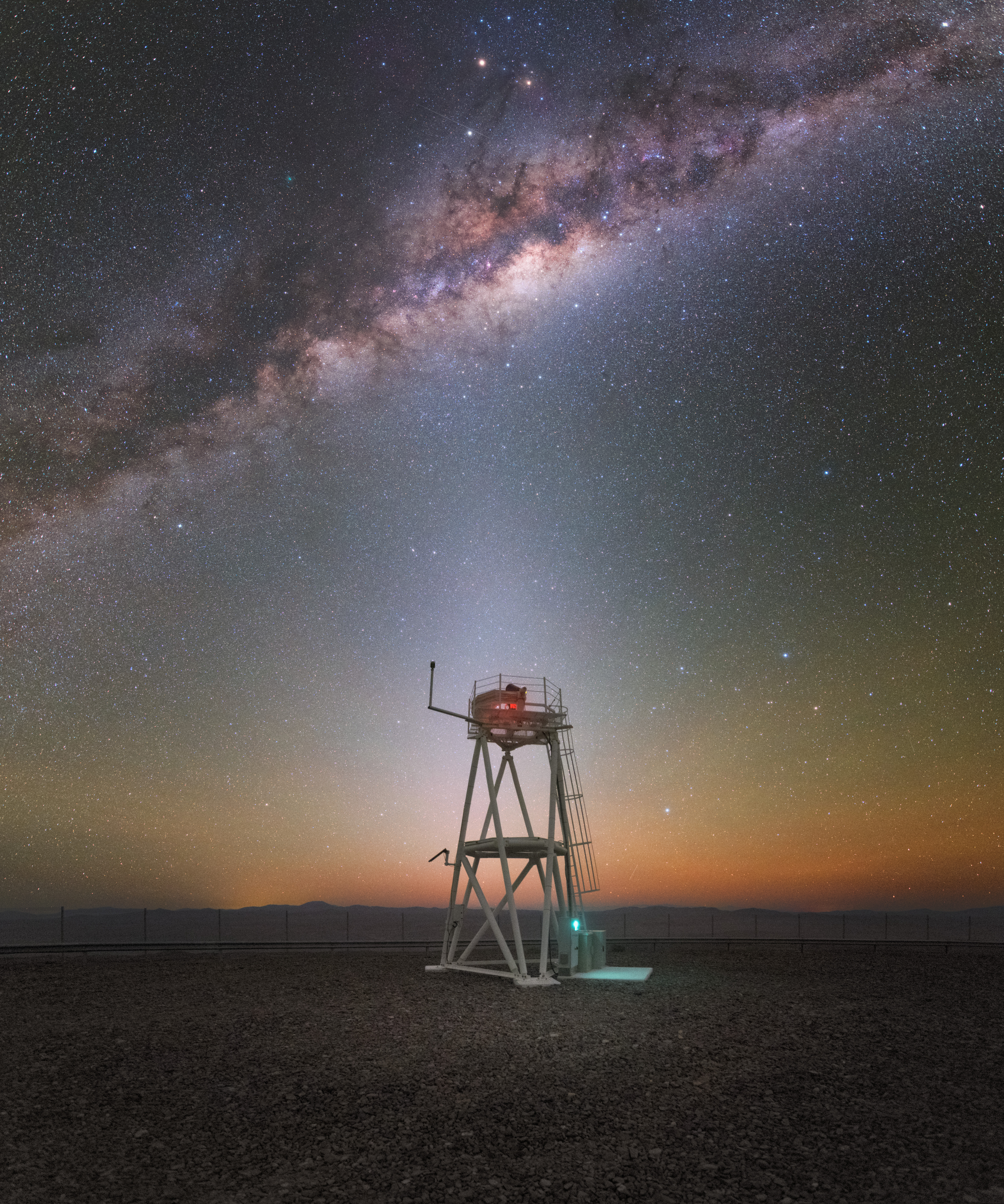
The Milky Way streaking across the skies above the Chilean Atacama Desert

== Protected areas ==
- Desierto Florido National Park
- Pan de Azúcar National Park
- La Chimba National Reserve
- Pampa del Tamarugal National Reserve

== Legends ==
- Alicanto
- Atacama Giant

== See also ==
- 2010 Copiapó mining accident
- Atacama Desert border dispute
- Camanchaca
- List of deserts by area
- Lomas
- Llano de Chajnantor Observatory
- Mano del Desierto
- Norte Grande
- Paposo
- Pulperia
- Puna de Atacama
- Salar de Atacama
- Transverse Valleys
- The asteroid 18725 Atacama has been named after the Atacama Desert.
- Lençóis Maranhenses National Park
- The climactic end to the James Bond movie, Quantum of Solace, is filmed in the Atacama Desert.
