= Eupithecia tamarugalis =

Scientific classification
- Kingdom: Animalia
- Phylum: Arthropoda
- Class: Insecta
- Order: Lepidoptera
- Family: Geometridae
- Genus: Eupithecia
- Species: E. tamarugalis

Binomial name
- Eupithecia tamarugalis H.A. Vargas & Parra, 2005

Species of moth

Eupithecia tamarugalis is a moth in the family Geometridae. It is found in the Pampa del Tamarugal in Chile.

The length of the forewings is about 7 mm for males.

The larvae feed on Prosopis tamarugo.

== Etymology ==
The specific name is based on the type locality.
