= Pampa del Tamarugal =

Partially desertified plain in northern Chile

Coordinates: 21°08′S 69°27′W

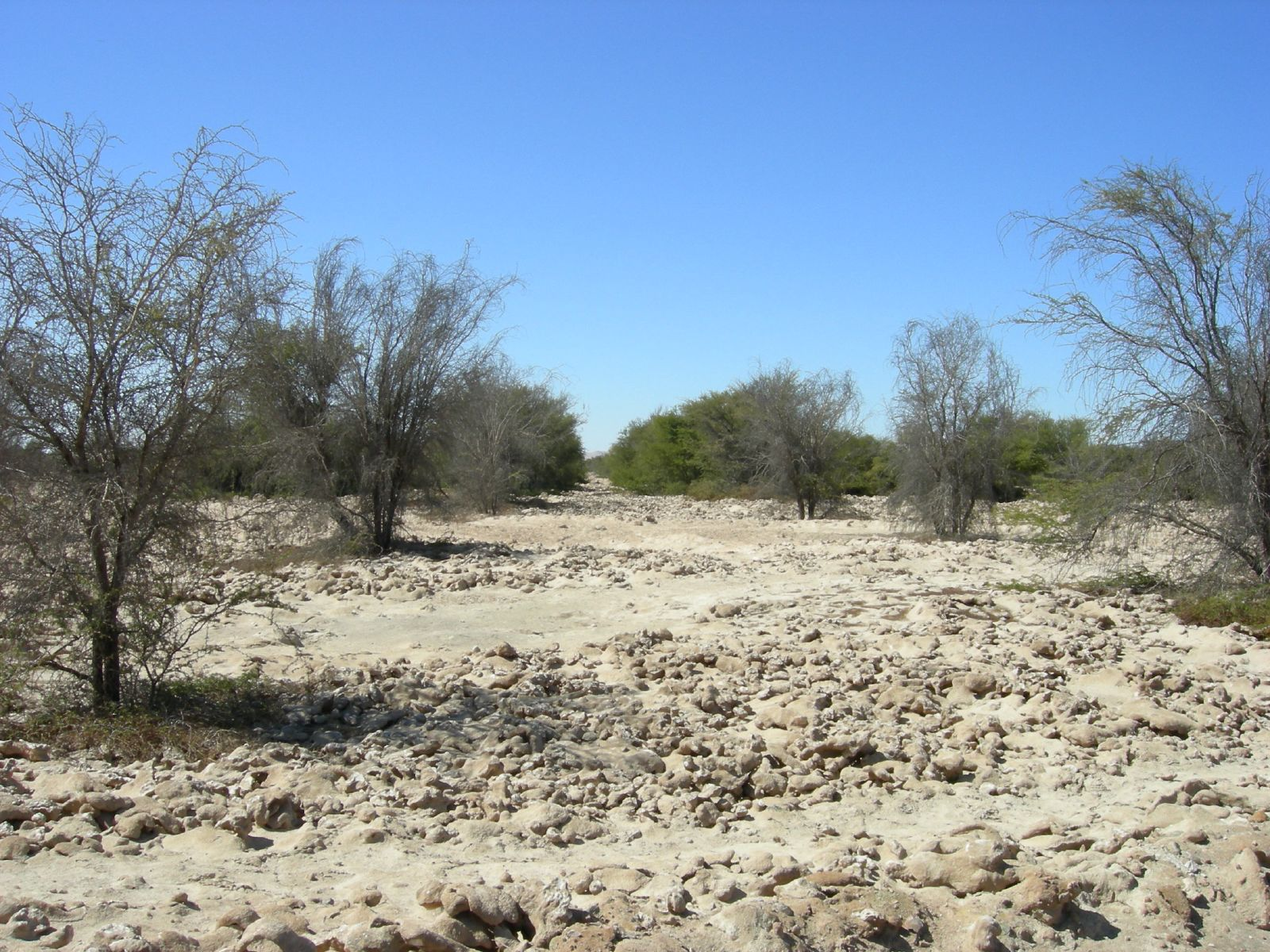
Open land in Pampa del Tamarugal, February 2006.

Pampa del Tamarugal ("Plateau of the Tamarugal") is a vast plain encompassing a significant portion of the Norte Grande, Chile, and originally named for the Prosopis tamarugo trees that used to cover its surface. It is located between the parallels 19°30’ and 22°15’ south latitude. Sometimes it is considered part of the Atacama Desert, however historically it wasn't. It is bounded on the west by the Chilean Coastal Range and on the east by the western slopes of the Andes. The plain occupies a surface area of 12,500 km^{2} with an average elevation of 1,100 m.

== Tourism ==
Among the major tourist attractions in the Pampa del Tamarugal are the world heritage site Humberstone and Santa Laura Saltpeter Works, the town of La Tirana, and the Pampa del Tamarugal National Reserve.

== Gallery ==
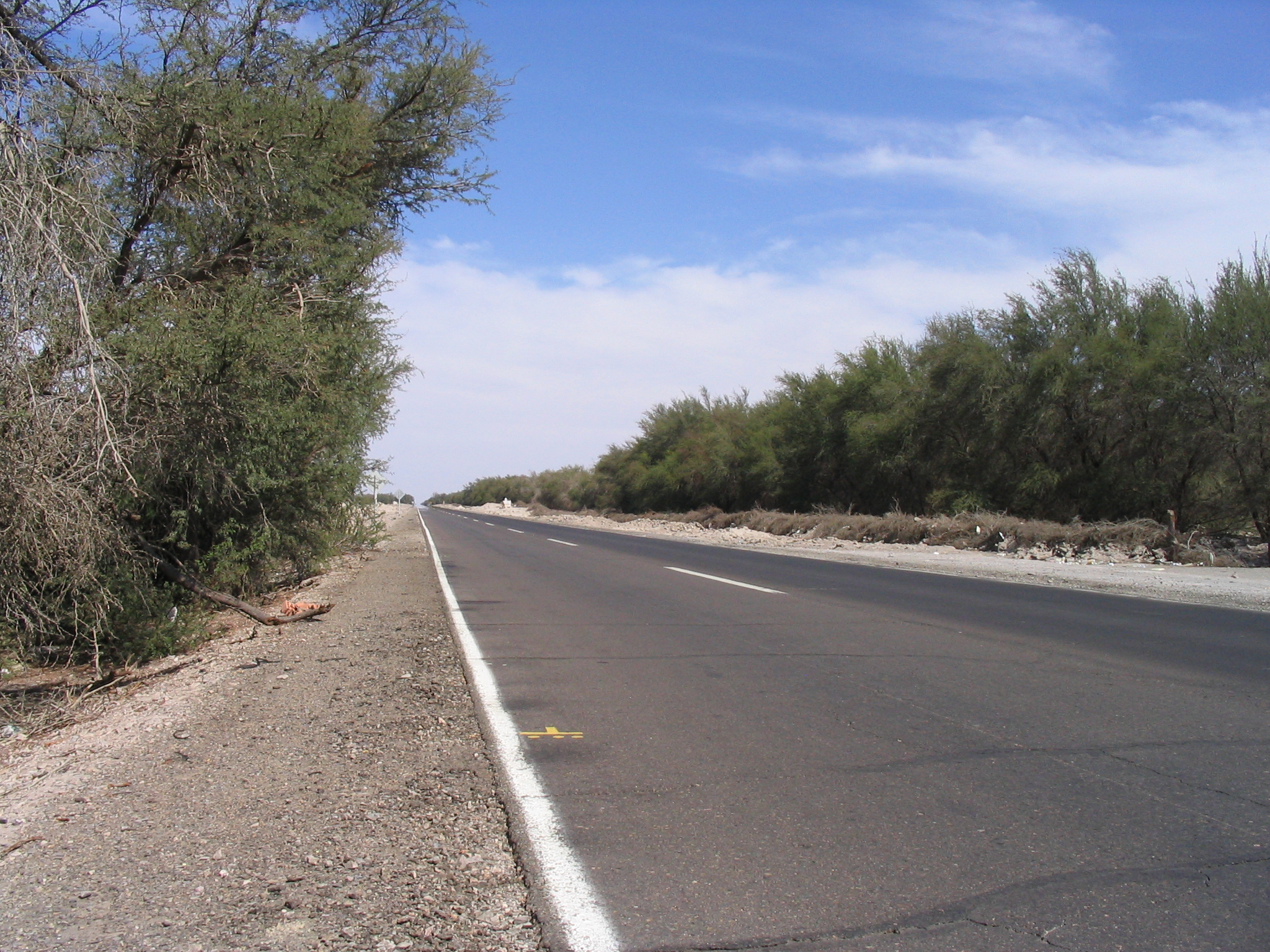
A modern forest in Pampa del Tamarugal as seen from Chile Route 5

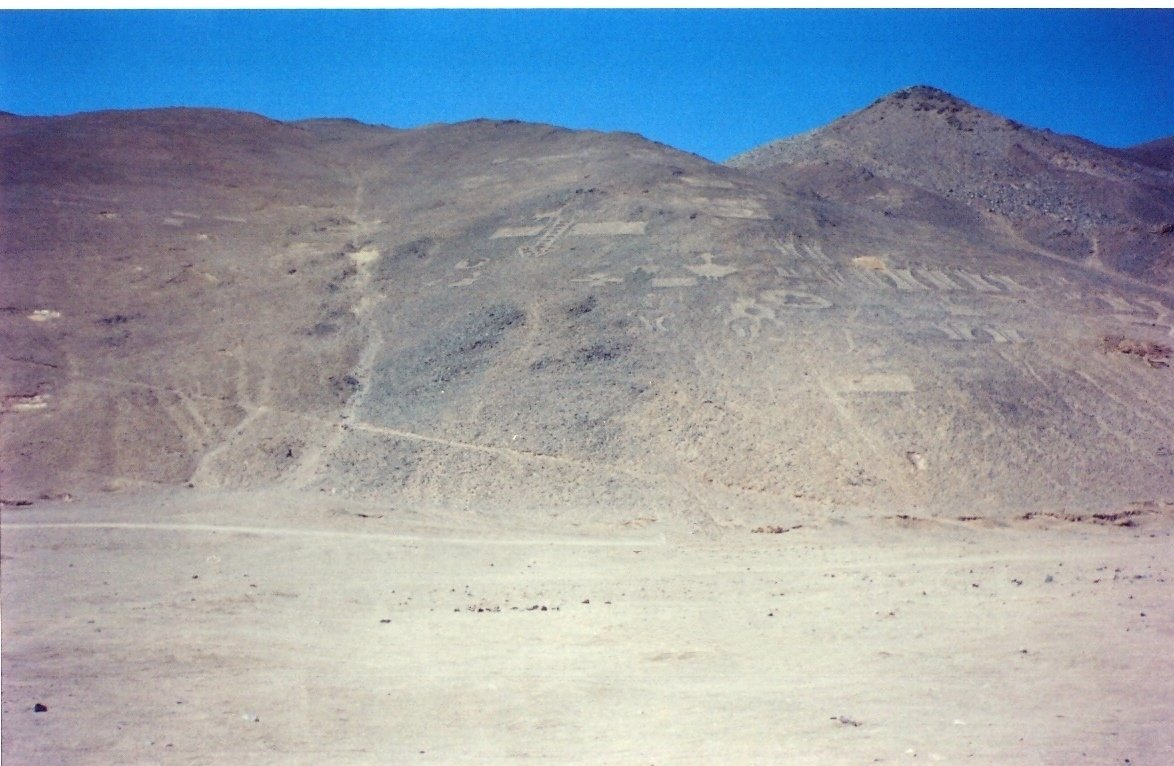
Pre-Hispanic geoglyphs next to Pampa del Tamarugal

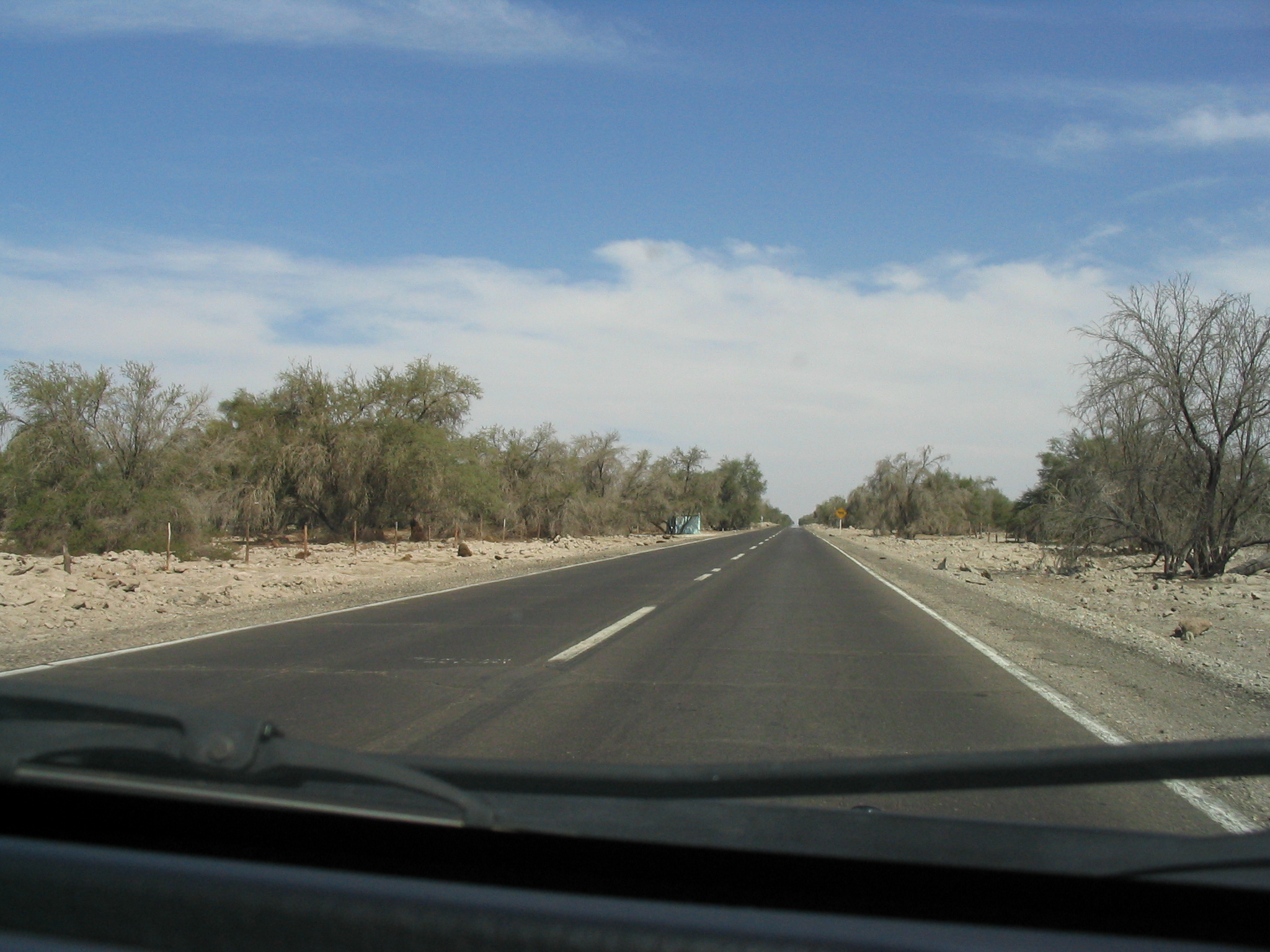
A modern forest in Pampa del Tamarugal as seen from Chile Route 5

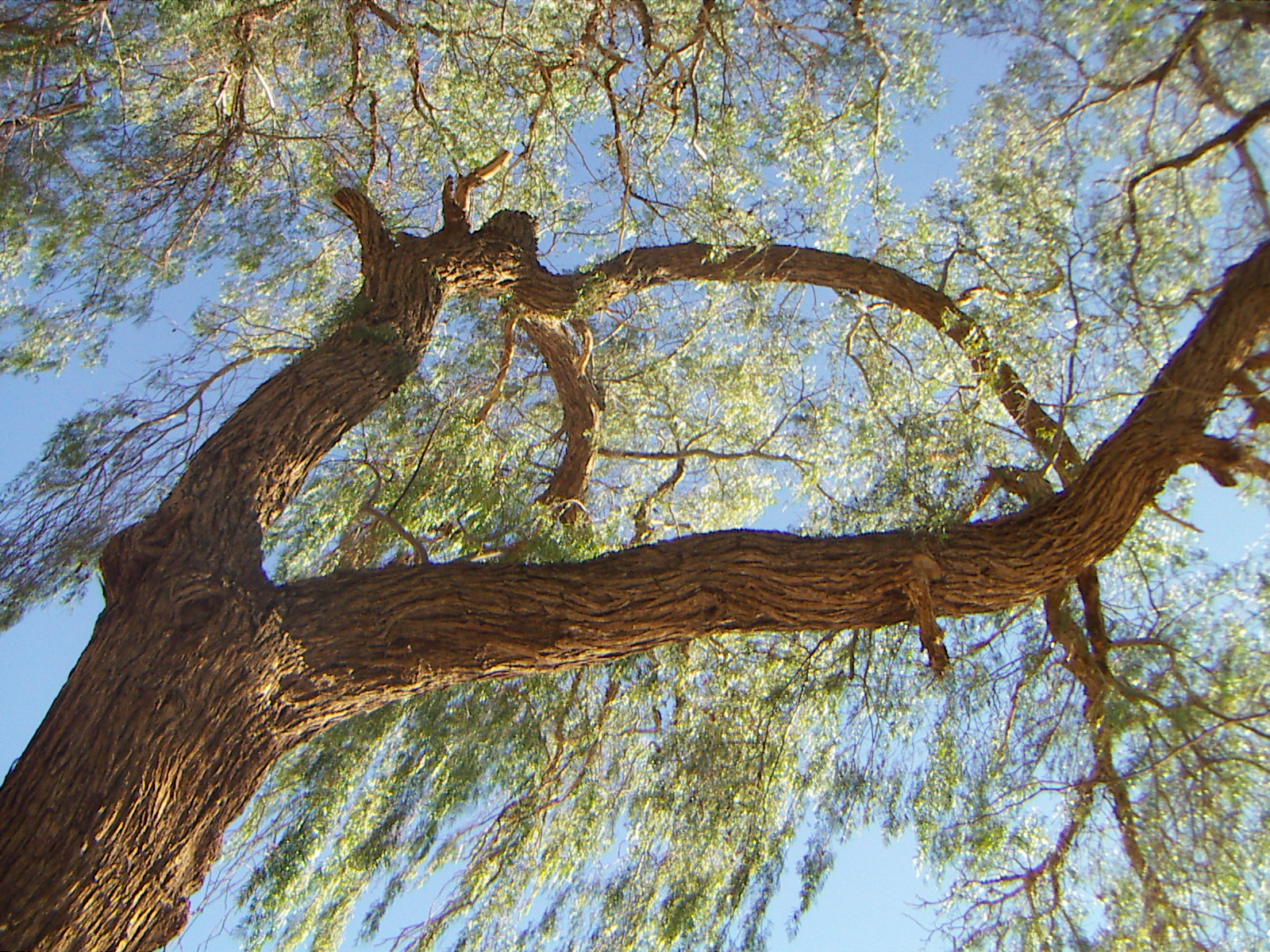
A Prosopis tamarugo tree

== See also ==
- Pampa del Tamarugal Aquifer
- Pulpería
