= Pampa del Tamarugal National Reserve =

Chile nature reserve

- IUCN category IV (habitat/species management area)
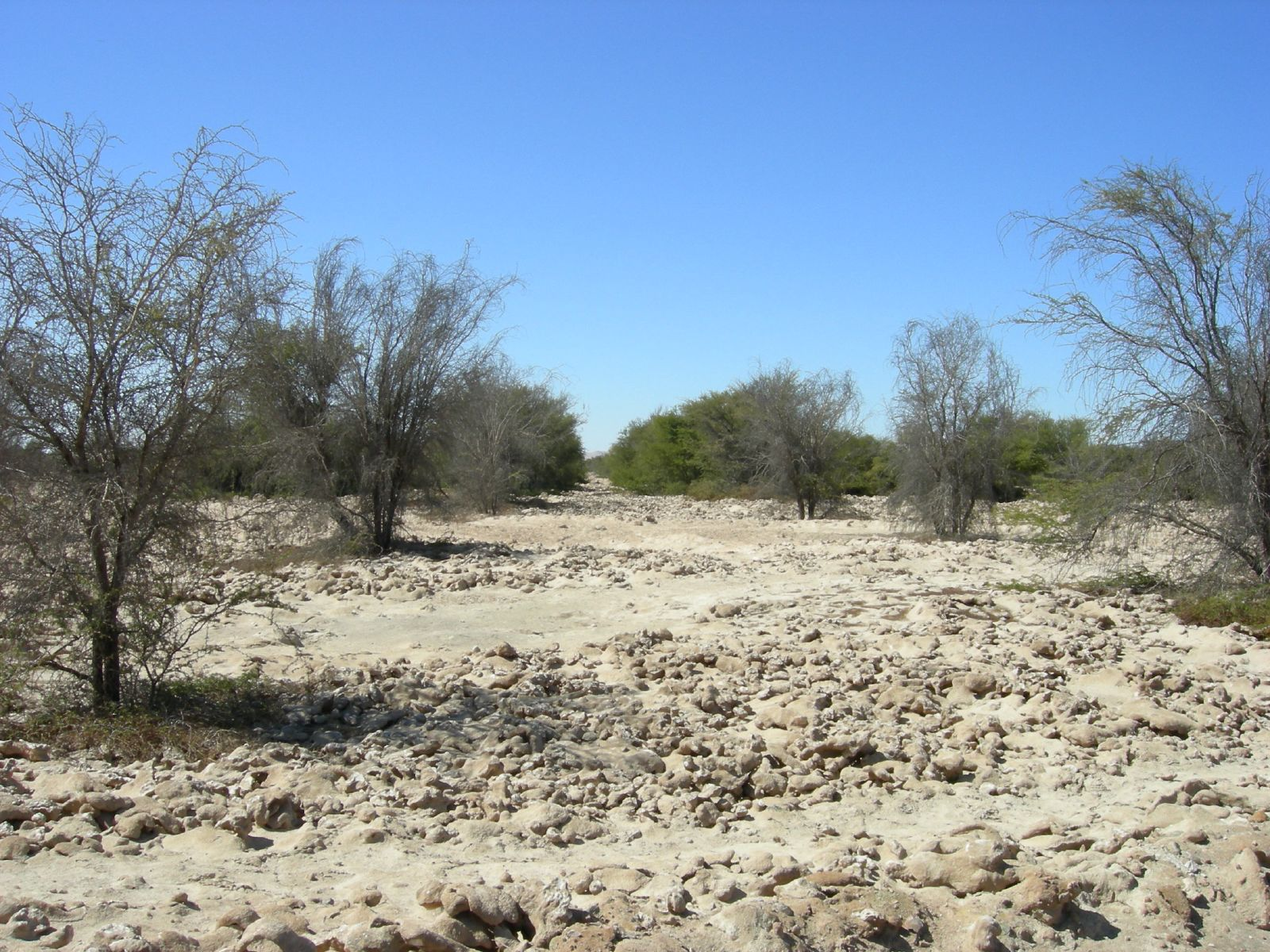
- View of the forest of Pampa del Tamarugal as seen in 2006.
- Interactive map of Pampa del Tamarugal National Reserve
- Location: Tarapacá Region, Chile
- Coordinates: 20.4722°S 69.6733°W
- Area: 1,271.49 km^{2} (490.93 sq mi)
- Designation: National reserve
- Designated: 1988
- Governing body: Corporación Nacional Forestal (CONAF)

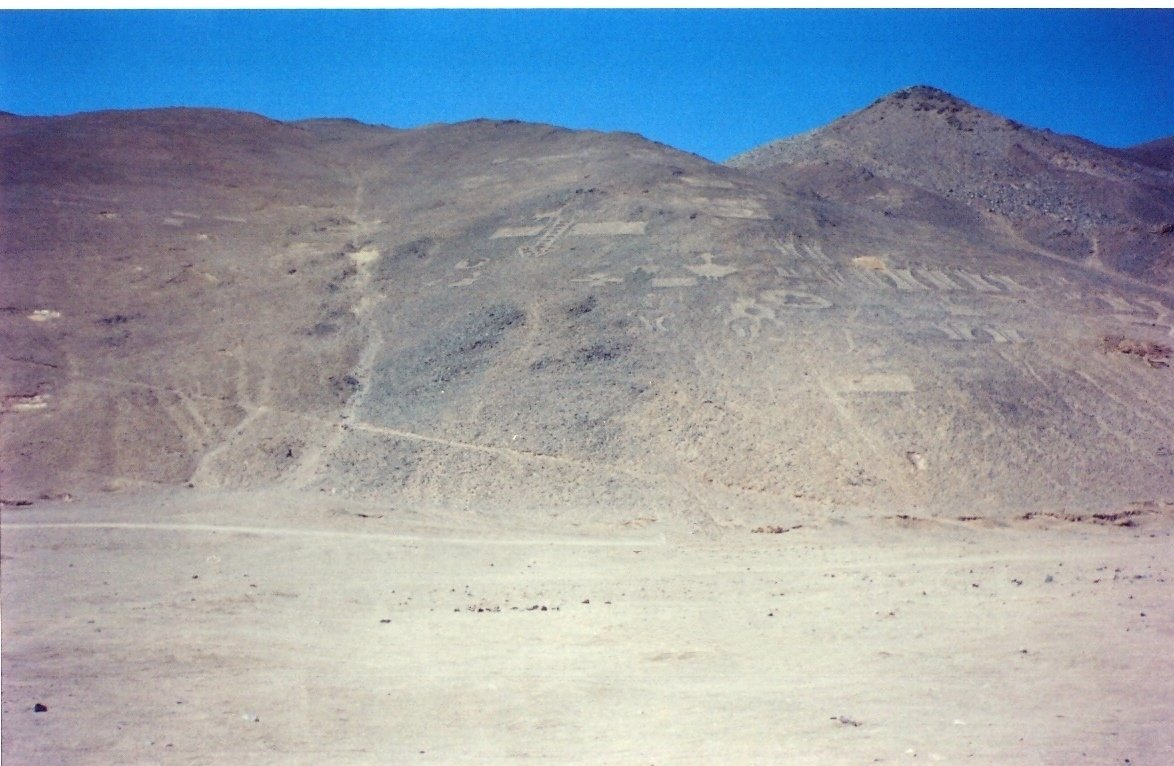
Pintados Geoglyphs

Pampa del Tamarugal National Reserve is a nature reserve of northern Chile's Tarapacá Region located in the Pampa del Tamarugal, about 70 km (43 mi) east of Iquique.

The reserve consists of three separate sectors: Zapiga, Bosque Nativo de La Tirana, and Pintados. The major highlights are the artificially planted forests of the genus Prosopis (primarily Prosopis tamarugo), found in the middle of a rainless desert, and the Pintados geoglyphs.

The protected area covers 1,271.49 square kilometres (127,149 ha) in total.

The sectors of Zapiga and Pintados are crossed by the Pan-American Highway and Sector Bosque Nativo de La Tirana can be accessed from A-665 Route.

== Sites ==
Geoglifos de Pintados: Precolumbian culture geoglyphs extended on 2 miles that portray more than 350 figures representing men, animals and abstract figures. Visit schedule: Mondays to Sundays, from 10:30 AM to 17:30 PM. There is an entrance fee.

== See also ==
- La Tirana
- Huara
- Pica
