= Paposo =

Town in Antofagasta Province, Chile

Coordinates: 25°00′30″S 70°27′53″W

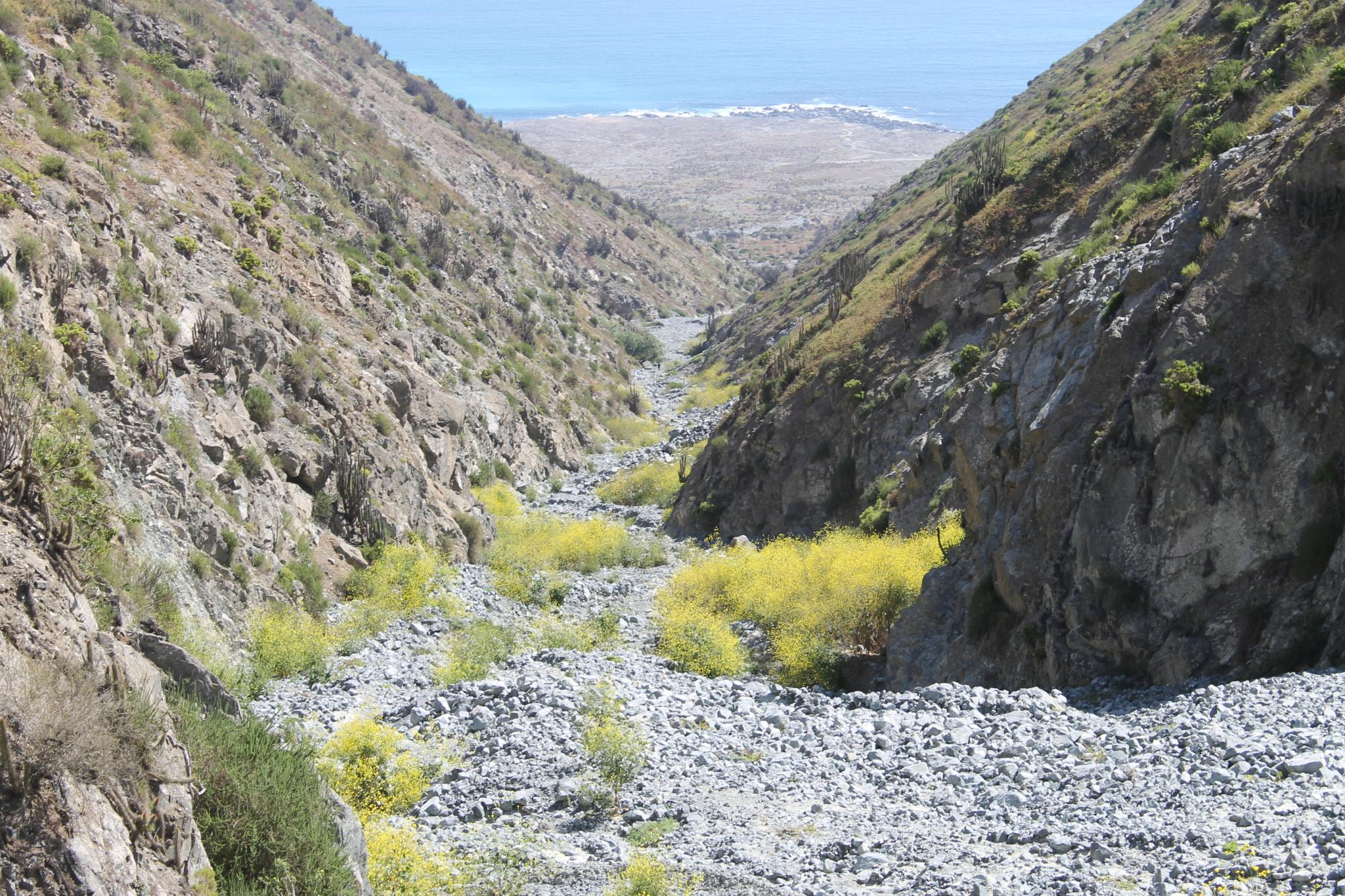
Quebrada de Medano, 18 km north of Paposo.

Paposo or Caleta Paposo is a hamlet in the southern part of Antofagasta Province, Chile. It is located on a narrow coastal plain bordering the Pacific Ocean. The census of 2002 counted 259 inhabitants, who predominantly relied on fishing and mining for a living. Paposo has a desert climate, but "fog oases" exist on mountain slopes near the sea. In a region almost devoid of vegetation, these oases, also called lomas, support a variety of flora found from about 1 km (0.62 miles) to 4 km (2.5 miles) inland.

== Geography and climate ==
Paposo is located adjacent to a cove on the coast of the Pacific Ocean in the Atacama Desert, the driest non-polar desert in the world. Vegetation is nearly absent in most of the Atacama. The foothills of the Andes rise steeply from the sea, reaching an elevation of 700 metres (2,300 ft) less than 2 kilometres (1.2 miles) from the sea.

Paposo and the Atacama have the BWn (desert) climate in the Köppen Classification, characterized by mild temperatures, unusual in desert climates, and much fog rolling in from the nearby ocean. Average temperatures in Paposo range from 13.4 °C (56.1 °F) in July to 20 °C (68 °F) in January, the warmest month. Annual precipitation is 16 millimetres (0.63 in). July has the most precipitation averaging 4 millimetres (0.16 in).

The climatic feature which permits the growth of vegetation on the slopes of the mountains rising above Paposo is the Garua or Camanchaca -- cloud banks caused by the cold waters of the ocean. Inland, on mountain sides up to an elevation of 1,000 metres (3,300 ft), the cloud banks form a dense fog which does not produce rain. The moisture that makes up the clouds measures between 1 and 40 microns across, producing mist and drizzle but too fine to form rain droplets.

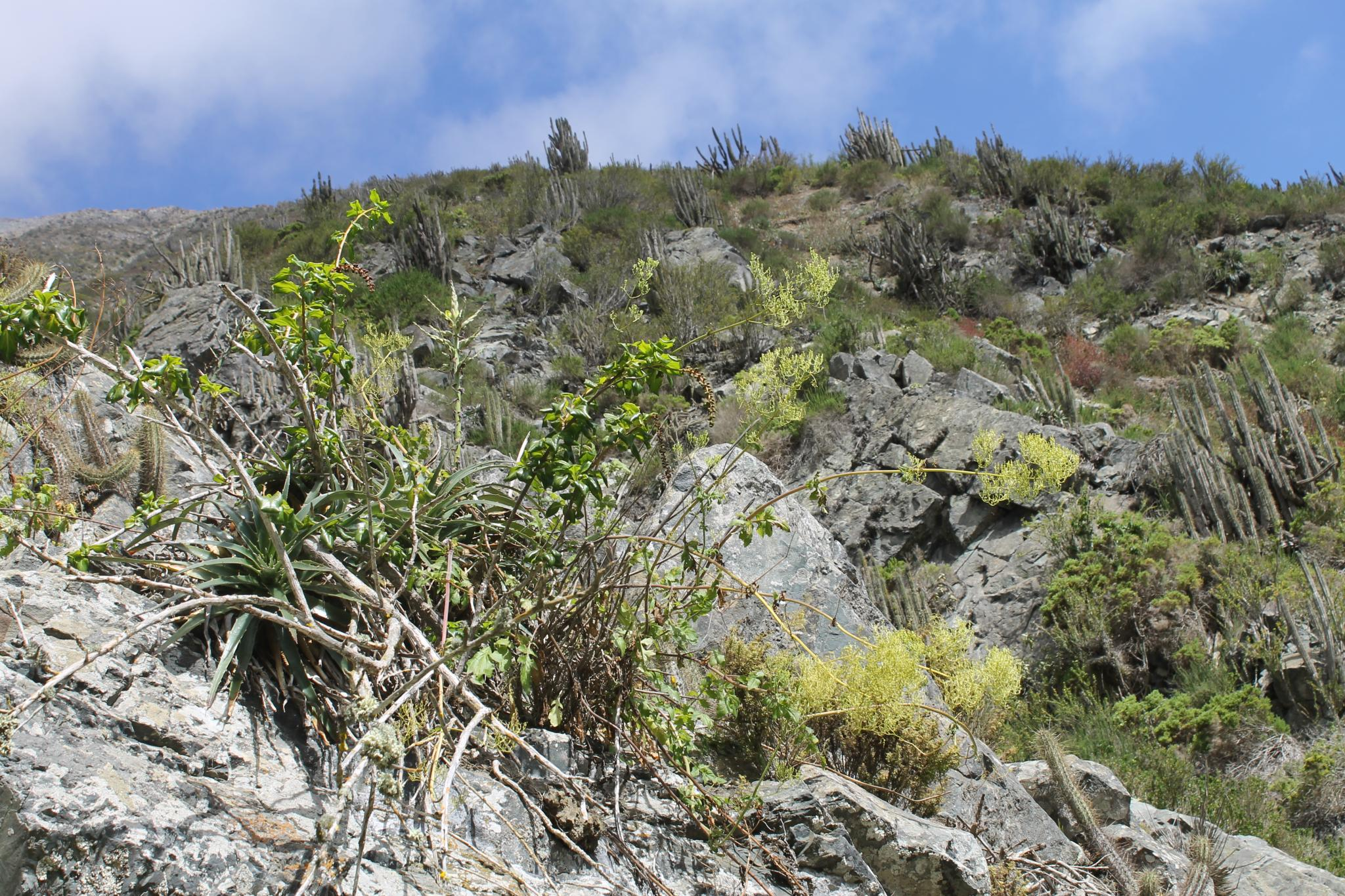
The fog oases of Paposo.
