= Glaciares de Santiago National Park =

National park in Chile

- Parque Nacional Glaciares de Santiago
- IUCN category II (national park)
- Tupungato peak

- Park location in Chile
- Location: Chile
- Nearest city: Santiago
- Coordinates: 33.498°S 69.888°W
- Area: 751 km^{2} (290 sq mi)
- Established: 2023
- Governing body: National Forest Corporation (CONAF)

Glaciares de Santiago National Park is a national park in central Chile. It is home to glaciers and high Andean peaks.

== Geography ==
Glaciares de Santiago National Park is located in Cordillera Province of the Santiago Metropolitan Region. The park is about 80 km (50 mi) east of Santiago and borders Argentina. It is a major water source for Santiago and the metropolitan region.

The park area is 751 km^{2} (290 sq mi). It is at an altitude of about 3,600 m (12,000 ft) and above. The park protects two rivers: the Olivares and the Colorado.

== Attractions ==
The park is best known for its glaciers, 368 in total with a total glaciated area of about 210 km^{2} (81 sq mi). There are 250 glaciers in the Colorado River basin and 118 in the Olivares basin. The park has no services and mountaineering experience is recommended.

== Flora and fauna ==
Plant species in the park include Erythranthe lutea, Fabiana imbricata, Sanicula graveolens, Solenomelus pedunculatus, Tortula muralis, Xanthium spinosum, and the endangered cactus Austrocactus spiniflorus.

The park hosts animals including guanaco, colocolo cat, Andean mouse (Andinomys edax), spiny toad (Rhinella spinulosa) and the endangered leopard tree iguana (Liolaemus leopardinus). Birds in the park include Andean condor (Vultur gryphus), Andean goose (Chloephaga melanoptera), Chilean eagle (Geranoaetus melanoleucus), Magellanic horned owl (Bubo magellanicus), Andean duck (Oxyura ferruginea), black-winged ground dove (Metriopelia melanoptera), common miner (Geositta cunicularia), ochre-naped ground tyrant (Muscisaxicola flavinucha) and mourning sierra finch (Rhopospina fruticeti).
