= Lomas =

Fog-watered bioregions in the coastal desert of Peru and northern Chile

Lomas, also called fog oases and mist oases, are areas of fog-watered vegetation in the coastal desert of Peru and northern Chile. About 100 lomas near the Pacific Ocean are identified between 5°S and 30°S latitude, a north–south distance of about 2,800 kilometres (1,700 mi). Lomas range in size from a small vegetated area to more than 40,000 hectares (99,000 acres) and their flora includes many endemic species. Apart from river valleys and the lomas the coastal desert is almost without vegetation. Scholars have described individual lomas as "an island of vegetation in a virtual ocean of desert."

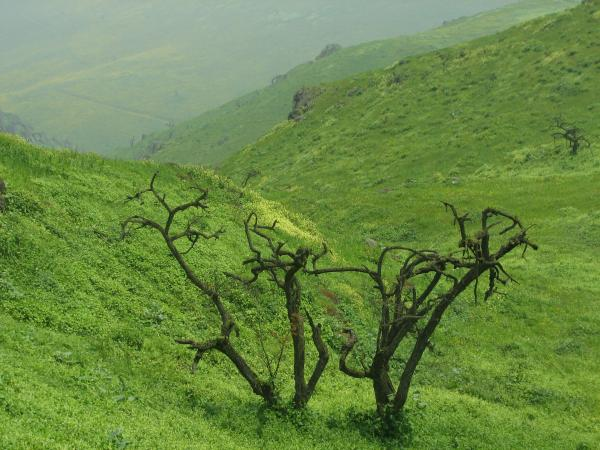
Lomas de Lachay is a protected area north of Lima.

In a nearly rainless desert, the lomas owe their existence to the moist dense fog and mist which rolls in from the Pacific. The fog is called garúa in Peru and Camanchaca in Chile.

== Environment ==
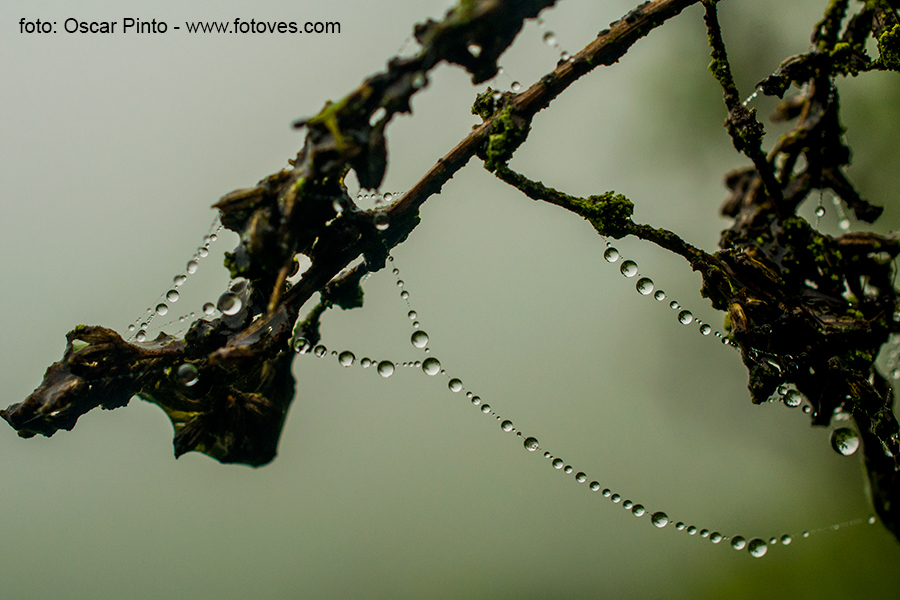
Moisture from the coastal fog condenses into water droplets that permit plants to flourish without rainfall.

According to the Köppen Climate Classification system, the coastal desert of Peru and the Atacama Desert of Chile feature a rare desert climate, that is abbreviated "BWn" on climate maps with the n denoting frequent fog. Temperatures are mild year round and precipitation is nearly non-existent, averaging 3 millimetres (0.12 in) to 13 millimetres (0.51 in) per year in most locations. Many years have no precipitation at all. The Atacama Desert of Chile is commonly known as the driest non-polar place in the world. Arica, Chile, in the middle portion of the coastal desert, went a record 173 months without measurable precipitation in the early 20th century.

Occasional rainfall is caused by El Niño. For example, in March 2015, the desert in Chile received about 25 millimetres (0.98 in) in one day which caused flooding. In a phenomenon called the flowering desert, after the rare rains the desert briefly blooms with flowers. Normally, with the nearly non-existent precipitation, the coastal desert is almost devoid of vegetation except in lomas and along rivers which originate in the Andes and cross the desert to the Pacific.

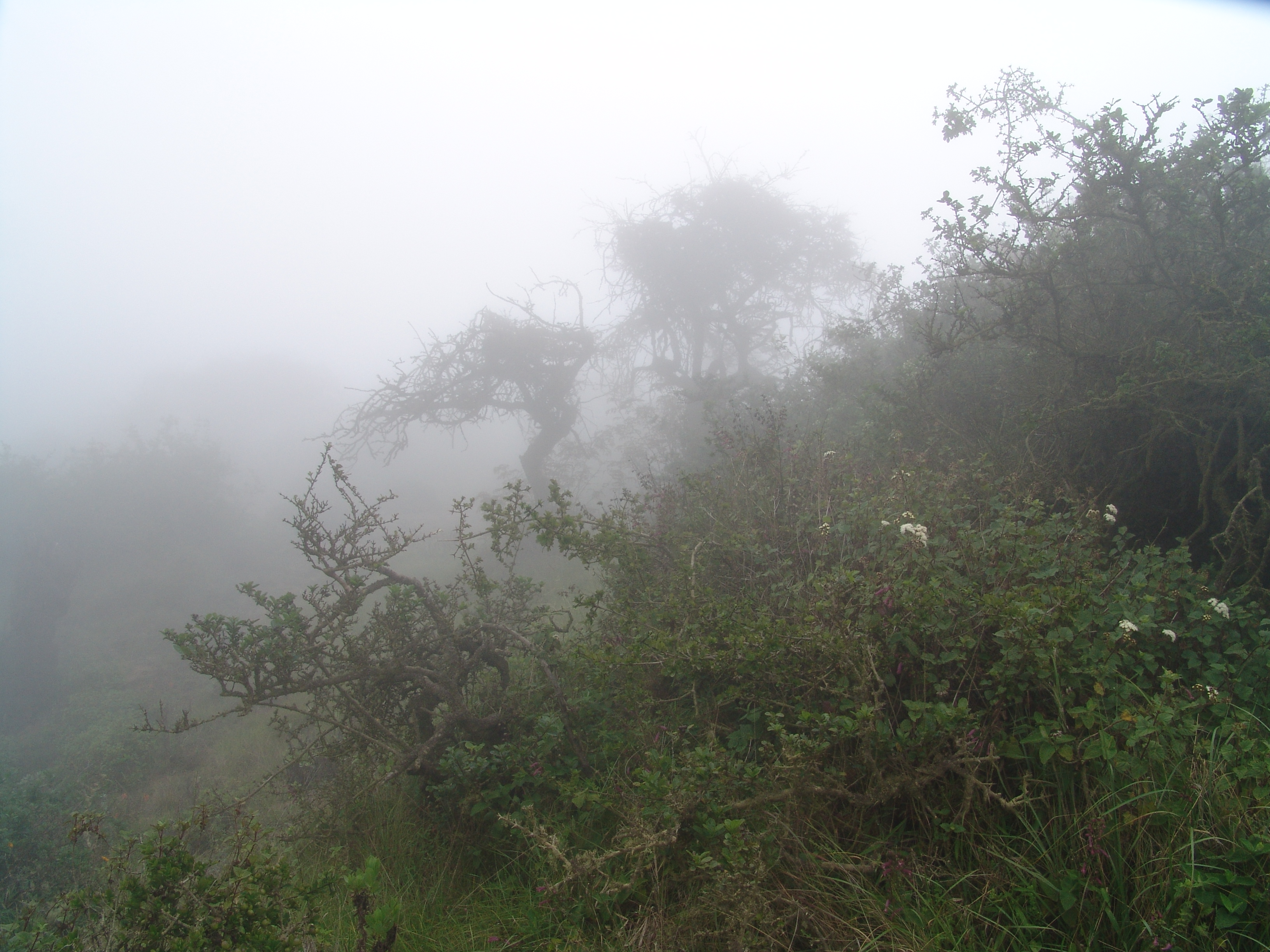
A fog oasis at the Atiquipa Lomas, Peru

The moisture for the vegetation in the lomas comes from fog which rolls in from the nearby Pacific Ocean and embraces mountains which come down near the sea. The cold waters of the Humboldt Current run offshore. During the austral winter thick stratus clouds, the garúa, creep inland to an altitude of 1,000 metres (3,300 ft) most days from May until November. During this season the vegetation in the lomas is lush and green and many species of flowers bloom. In the austral summer from December to April, the weather is mostly sunny and the lomas become dryer. The moisturizing impact of the fog is increased by the mild temperatures throughout the year and high average humidity of the coastal deserts. For example, Lima, Peru, located at 12°S latitude has average monthly temperatures ranging from 17 °C (63 °F) to 23 °C (73 °F), very cool for locations in the tropics. Lima's average humidity is 84 percent, more than double the average humidity in most deserts.

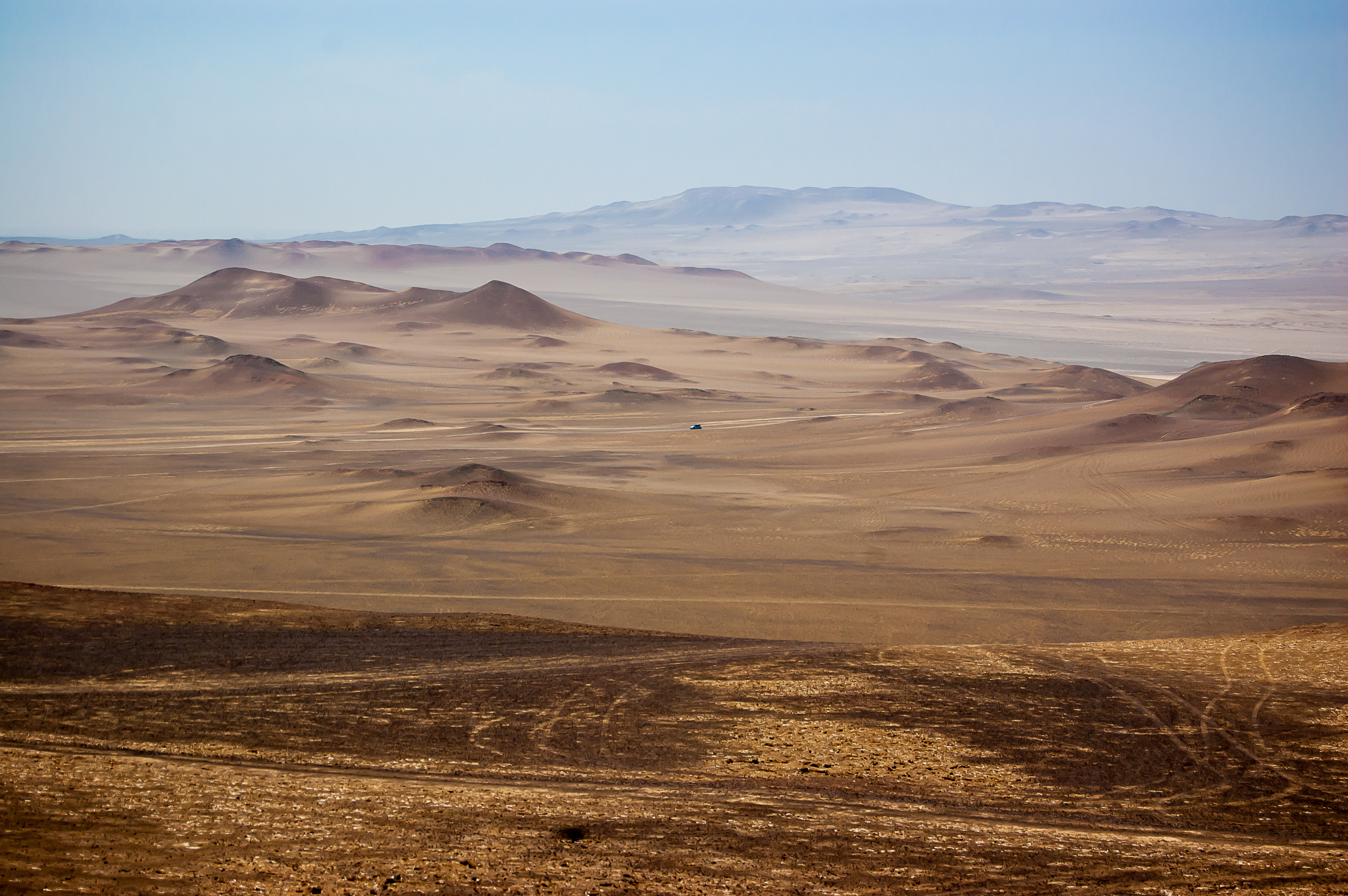
Except for the lomas and river valleys the deserts of Chile and Peru are barren.

Lomas comprise less than two percent of the coastal desert areas of Chile and Peru. Peru has more than 40 lomas totaling in area less than 2,000 square kilometres (770 sq mi) out of a total desert area of 144,000 square kilometres (56,000 sq mi). Chile has almost 50 lomas with an area of less than 5,000 square kilometres (1,900 sq mi) out of a total desert area of 291,000 square kilometres (112,000 sq mi).

== Climate change ==
Teetering on a narrow edge of survival, the lomas are sensitive to climate change. Radio-carbon dating has indicated that, prior to 3800 BCE, the Peruvian desert north of Lima (12° S latitude) received more seasonal precipitation and was mostly vegetated. Lomas—isolated fog oases—existed only south of Lima. This is evidenced by the uniformity of plant species in present-day lomas north of Lima while lomas south of Lima have more endemic plant species, indicating geographic isolation. The cause of the climatic change was probably the duration and strength of El Niño events.

== Destruction ==
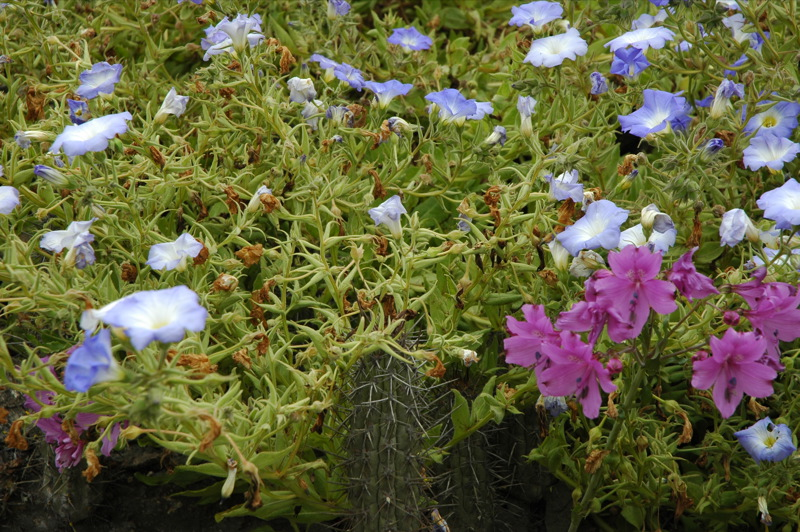
Nolana and Alstromeria bloom in a lomas near Paposo, Chile.

Lomas have been impacted, and in some cases destroyed, by centuries of unregulated grazing, wood-cutting, and mining. In Chile, the Huasco (28°26′ S) and Copiapó (27°22′ S) river valleys once supported dense stands of trees. In the 18th century, the city of Copiapó was known as San Francisco de la Selva (Saint Francis of the Forest) for its extensive forests. As the branches of trees and bushes trap the fog and create more moisture for other plants, their absence reduces the viability for all the plant life in the lomas.

In many locations the lomas were over-exploited for agriculture and grazing. One example is that, in prehistoric times, 25 kilometres (16 mi) north of Ilo, Peru, far from any other source of water, four lomas-fed springs permitted about 85 hectares (210 acres) of irrigated agriculture plus grazing for llamas and alpacas. Hundreds of people of the Chiribaya culture benefited from this unlikely agriculture in a rainless land. Later, during the 17th century, Spanish colonists pastured 200 mules in these lomas. As late as 1951, a few tara trees still lived although the lomas were by then nearly devoid of all vegetation and population.

== Preservation ==
In Peru, the Reserva Nacional de Lachay (National Preserve of Lachay) (11°22′S) protects 5,070 hectares (12,500 acres) 105 kilometres (65 miles) north of Lima.

The Lomas de Atiquipa (15°48′S) is the largest and the best preserved lomas forest in Peru, covering more than 42,000 hectares (100,000 acres) with some 350 plant species, including 44 endemics. The National University of Saint Augustine in Arequipa has partnered with Peruvian conservation groups and the Nature Conservancy to preserve and restore the environment of the lomas. Included in the project is the installation of fog-catching nets to capture water, thereby helping the 80 families who live within the area to expand agriculture, primarily of olives. Similar methods have been used for the conservation of lomas in Lima.

In Chile the Pan de Azúcar (26°09′S) and Llanos de Challe (28°10′) National Parks and the La Chimba National Reserve (23°32′S, 70°21′W) preserve lomas. The richest diversity of species of lomas flora in Chile, however, is near the village of Paposo (25°00′S). The fog oasis near Paposo occur at elevations of 200 metres (660 ft) to 1,000 metres (3,300 ft) with altitudes from 400 metres (1,300 ft) to 700 metres (2,300 ft) having the most abundant growth of vegetation. The Paposo area has been declared a Zone of Ecological Protection by the Government of Chile.
