= List of national parks of Chile =

National parks located within Chile

There are 48 national parks in Chile covering a total area of 18.8 million hectares, corresponding to 21% of the national territory.

== Table ==
National parks of Chile. Rapa Nui National Park not shown.

Name	Photo	Natural region	Area	Established
Alberto de Agostini		Zona Austral	14,600 km^{2} (5,637 sq mi)	2000
Alerce Andino		Zona Sur	393 km^{2} (152 sq mi)	1982
Alerce Costero		Zona Sur	139 km^{2} (54 sq mi)	2012
Archipiélago de Juan Fernández		Zona Central	96 km^{2} (37 sq mi)	1935
Bernardo O'Higgins		Zona Austral	35,259 km^{2} (13,614 sq mi)	1969
Bosque de Fray Jorge		Norte Chico	100 km^{2} (39 sq mi)	1941
Cabo de Hornos		Zona Austral	631 km^{2} (244 sq mi)	1945
Cerro Castillo		Zona Austral	1,795.5 km^{2} (693 sq mi)	2018
Chiloé		Zona Austral	431 km^{2} (166 sq mi)	1983
Conguillío		Zona Sur	608 km^{2} (235 sq mi)	1950
Corcovado		Zona Austral	2,096 km^{2} (809 sq mi)	2005
Desierto Florido		Norte Chico	571 km^{2} (220 sq mi)	2023
Diego Ramirez Islands & Drake Passage		Zona Austral	144,390 km^{2} (55,749 sq mi)	2018
Glaciares de Santiago		Zona Central	751 km^{2} (290 sq mi)	2023
Hornopirén		Zona Austral	482 km^{2} (186 sq mi)	1988
Huerquehue		Zona Sur	125 km^{2} (48 sq mi)	1967
Isla Guamblin		Zona Austral	106.25 km^{2} (41 sq mi)	1967
Isla Magdalena		Zona Austral	1,576 km^{2} (608 sq mi)	1983
Kawésqar		Zona Sur	23,138 km^{2} (8,934 sq mi)	1969
La Campana		Zona Central	80 km^{2} (31 sq mi)	1967
Laguna del Laja		Zona Central	119 km^{2} (46 sq mi)	1958
Laguna San Rafael		Zona Austral	17,420 km^{2} (6,726 sq mi)	1959
Las Palmas de Cocalán		Zona Central	37.02 km^{2} (14 sq mi)	1971
Lauca		Norte Grande	1,379 km^{2} (532 sq mi)	1970
Llanos de Challe		Norte Chico	457 km^{2} (176 sq mi)	1994
Llullaillaco		Norte Grande	2,687 km^{2} (1,037 sq mi)	1995
Melimoyu		Zona Austral	1,055 km^{2} (407 sq mi)	2018
Morro Moreno		Norte Grande	73 km^{2} (28 sq mi)	2010
Nahuelbuta		Zona Sur	68 km^{2} (26 sq mi)	1939
Nevado Tres Cruces		Norte Grande	591 km^{2} (228 sq mi)	1994
Nonguén		Zona Central	30.37 km^{2} (12 sq mi)	2021
Pali Aike		Zona Austral	50 km^{2} (19 sq mi)	1970
Pan de Azúcar		Norte Grande	438 km^{2} (169 sq mi)	1985
Patagonia		Zona Austral	3,045.28 km^{2} (1,176 sq mi)	2018
Pumalín Douglas Tompkins		Zona Austral	4,023.92 km^{2} (1,554 sq mi)	2018
Puyehue		Zona Sur	1,068 km^{2} (412 sq mi)	1941
Queulat		Zona Austral	1,541 km^{2} (595 sq mi)	1983
Radal Siete Tazas		Zona Central	5,148 km^{2} (1,988 sq mi)	2008
Rapa Nui		Zona Central	71.3 km^{2} (28 sq mi)	1935
Río Clarillo		Zona Central	101.85 km^{2} (39 sq mi)	2020
Salar del Huasco		Norte Grande	1,600 km^{2} (618 sq mi)	2010
Tolhuaca		Zona Sur	65 km^{2} (25 sq mi)	1935
Torres del Paine		Zona Austral	2,400 km^{2} (927 sq mi)	1959
Vicente Pérez Rosales		Zona Sur	2,530 km^{2} (977 sq mi)	1926
Villarrica		Zona Sur	630 km^{2} (243 sq mi)	1940
Volcán Isluga		Norte Grande	1,747 km^{2} (675 sq mi)	1967
Yendegaia		Zona Austral	1,480 km^{2} (571 sq mi)	2013

== See also ==
- Protected areas of Chile; protected natural areas
- National Monuments of Chile; structures and sites of cultural heritage
