= Llanos de Challe National Park =

National Park in the Atacama region, Chile

- IUCN category II (national park)
- Location within Chile
- Location: Atacama Region, Chile
- Nearest city: Huasco
- Coordinates: 28°10′0″S 71°0′0″W
- Governing body: Corporación Nacional Forestal

Llanos de Challe National Park is located on the Pacific coast of the Atacama Region, Chile. The nearly-rainless park's mountains are moistened by the Camanchaca, creating a fog and mist-fed ecosystem called lomas (Spanish for "hills"). The park is one of the southernmost locations of the lomas which are scattered along the coastal desert from northern Chile to northern Peru. The highest elevation in the park is Cerro Negro at 950 m.

This fragile coastal desert ecosystem is habitat for rare and beautiful plants species, including the threatened Leontochir ovallei, known locally as Garra de León. In addition to, cactus are abundant in the park.

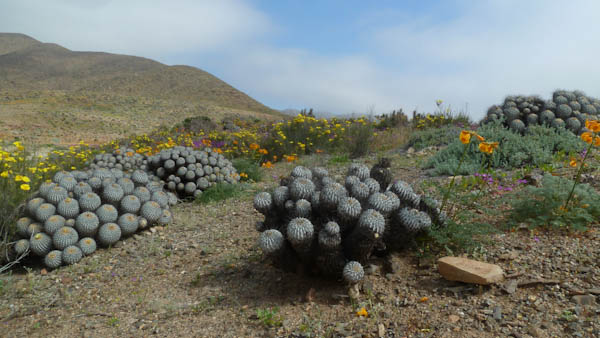
Desert vegetation in the park.

The park is one of the best places for contemplating the natural phenomenon known as desierto florido (desert bloom), which occurs occasionally as a consequence of rains brought to the park by El Niño-Southern Oscillation.

The park has the largest population of guanacos in the Atacama Region. The park's seashore and surrounding area feature unspoiled white-sand beaches and a coastal wetland, which shelters common moorhens, red-gartered coots, black-necked swans and flamingos.

A small illegal mining operation in the park was detected and dismantled in 2021. The mining operation included an encampampment where twelve persons lived on the fringes of the park in Quebrada Minillas, a site of historic mining.
