= Desierto Florido National Park =

National park in Chile

- Parque Nacional Desierto Florido
- IUCN category II (national park)
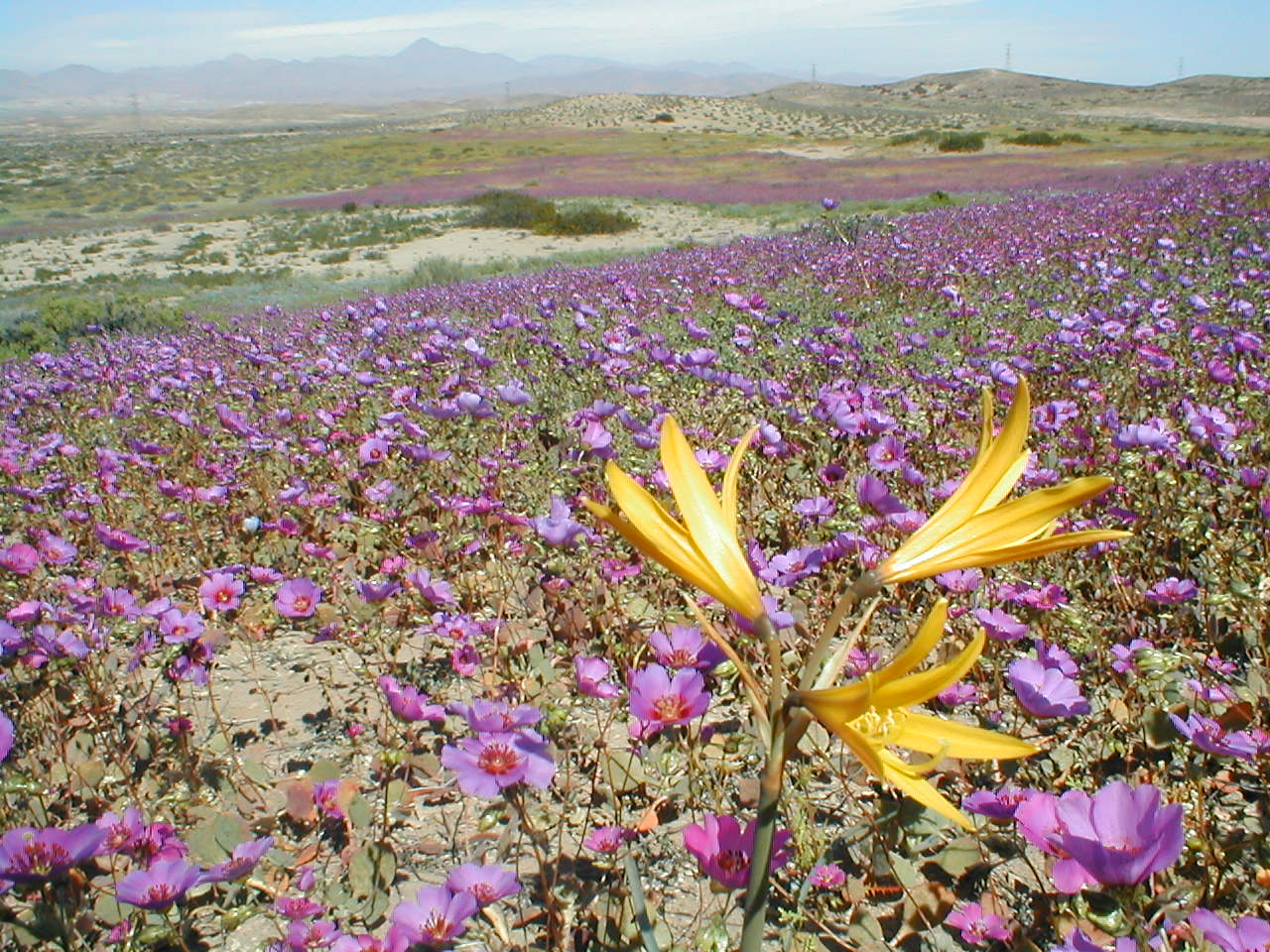

- Park location in Chile
- Location: Chile
- Nearest city: Copiapó
- Coordinates: 27.573°S 70.47°W
- Area: 571 km^{2} (220 sq mi)
- Established: 2023
- Governing body: National Forest Corporation (CONAF)

Desierto Florido National Park is a national park in the Atacama Desert of Chile.

== Geography ==
Desierto Florido National Park is located in Copiapó Province of Atacama Region. The park is about 30 km (20 mi) south of Copiapó and about 80 km (50 mi) north of Vallenar. Chile Route 5 passes through the park. The park's area is 571 km^{2} (220 sq mi).

== Attractions ==
The park is best known for its namesake phenomenon, the "flowering desert". Every few years, given the right weather conditions, the local desert blooms with the flowers of over 200 plant species. This supports an ecosystem of birds, animals and insects.

== Flora and fauna ==
Plant species in the park include Adesmia argentea, Alstroemeria kingii, Aristolochia chilensis, Bulnesia chilensis, Cordia decandra, Krameria cistoidea, Malesherbia humilis, Miqueliopuntia miquelii, Pintoa chilensis, Tillandsia landbeckii and the endangered Copiapoa megarhiza. Five species of Nolana and three species of Eriosyce are also present.

The park hosts animals including the Chilean iguana (Callopistes maculatus), the Atacama tree iguana (Liolaemus atacamensis) and the coruro (Spalacopus cyanus). Birds in the park include black-faced ibis (Theristicus melanopis), burrowing owl, Diuca finch (Diuca diuca), common miner (Geositta cunicularia) and oasis hummingbird (Rhodopis vesper).
