= Atiquipa District =

Coordinates: 15.8084°S 74.3629°W

Atiquipa
- District
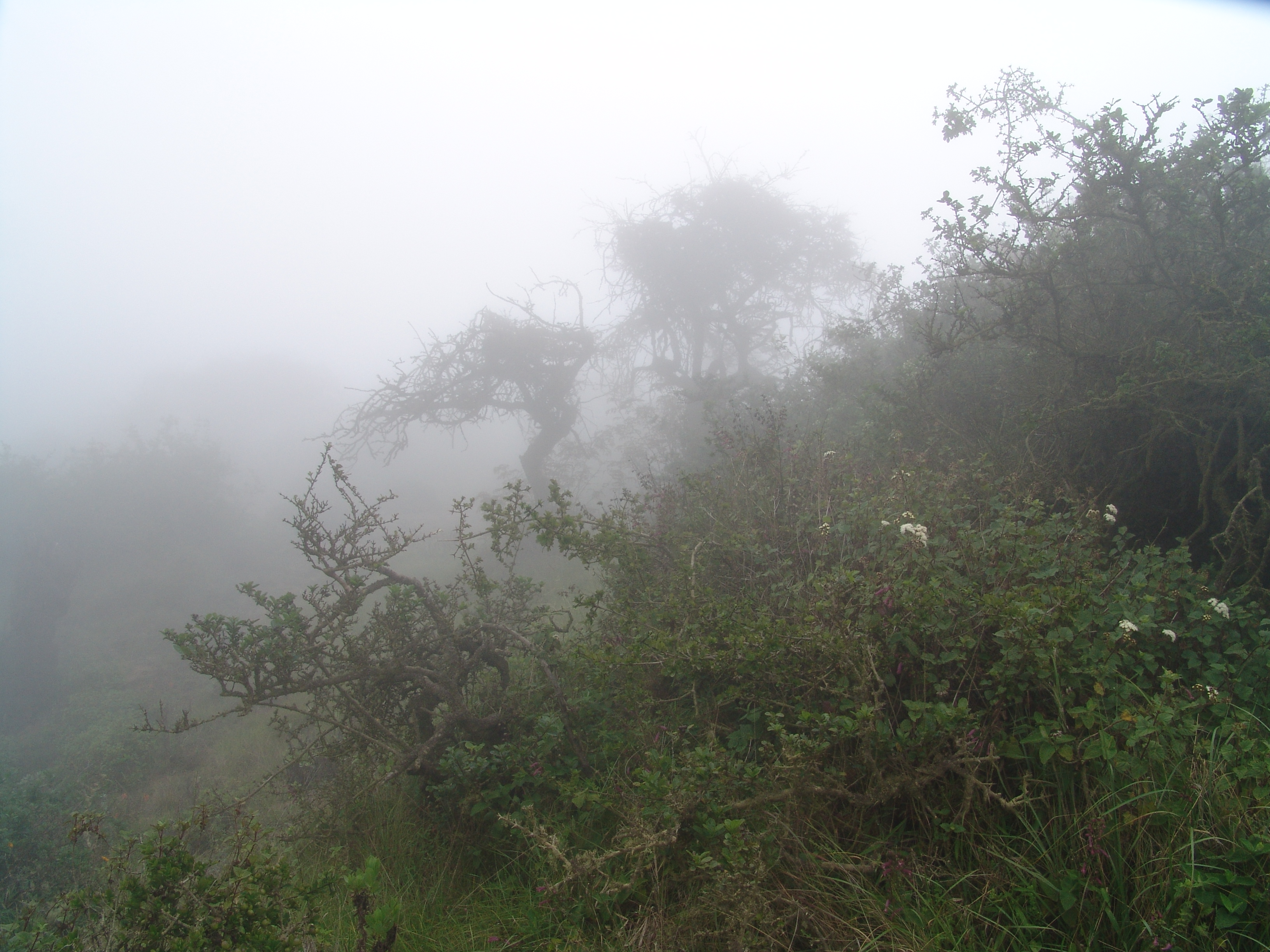
- Garúa at the Lomas of Atiquipa
- Interactive map of Atiquipa
- Country: Peru
- Region: Arequipa
- Province: Caravelí
- Capital: Atiquipa

Government
  - Mayor: Fortunato Fernando Palomino Chalco

Area
  - Total: 423.55 km^{2} (163.53 sq mi)
- Elevation: 325 m (1,066 ft)

Population (2005 census)
  - Total: 561
  - Density: 1.32/km^{2} (3.43/sq mi)
- Time zone: UTC-5 (PET)
- UBIGEO: 040304

Atiquipa District is one of thirteen districts of Caravelí Province in the Arequipa Region of Peru.

== Environment ==
Atiquipa is located in the coastal desert of Peru, an almost rainless area. However, heavy fogs and mists, called garúa, permit vegetation to grow on the mountain slopes of the district. This vegetated fog oasis is called the Lomas de Atiquipa, It is the largest and the best preserved fog oasis in Peru, covering more than 42,000 hectares (100,000 acres) with some 350 plant species, including 44 endemics. Conservation organizations are attempting to preserve and restore the environment of the lomas. Included in the project is the installation of fog-catching nets to capture water and thereby help the 80 families who live within the area to expand agriculture, primarily growing olives.
