= Garúa =

Spanish word meaning drizzle or mist

Garúa is a Spanish word meaning drizzle or mist. Although used in other contexts in the Spanish-speaking world, garúa most importantly refers to the moist cold fog that blankets the coasts of Peru, southern Ecuador, and northern Chile, especially during the southern hemisphere winter. In Chile, a similar fog is called camanchaca. Garúa brings mild temperatures and high humidity to a tropical coastal desert. It also provides moisture from fog and mist to a nearly-rainless region and permits the existence of vegetated fog oases, called lomas.

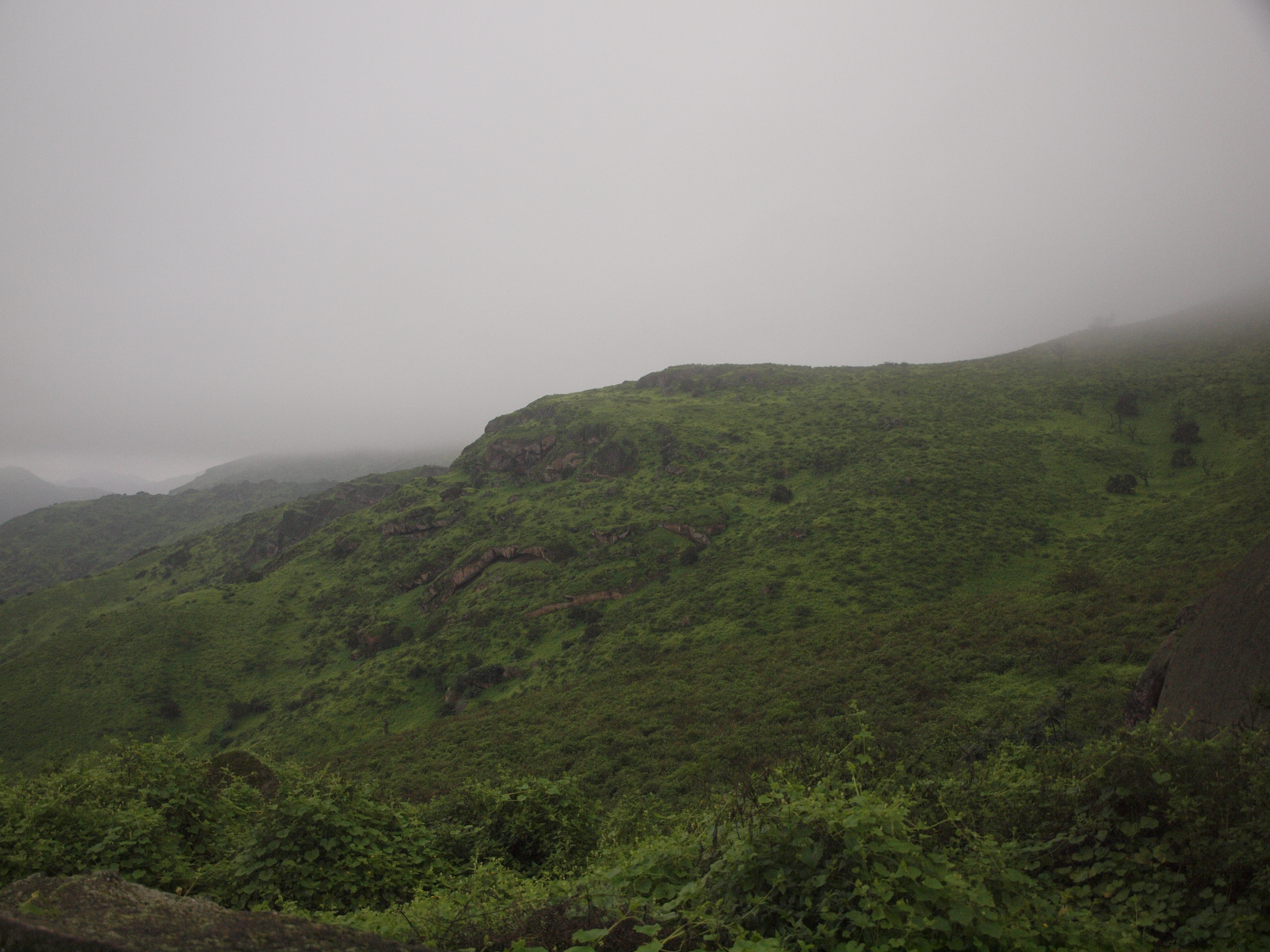
Garúa in Lomas de Lachay, near Lima, Peru,

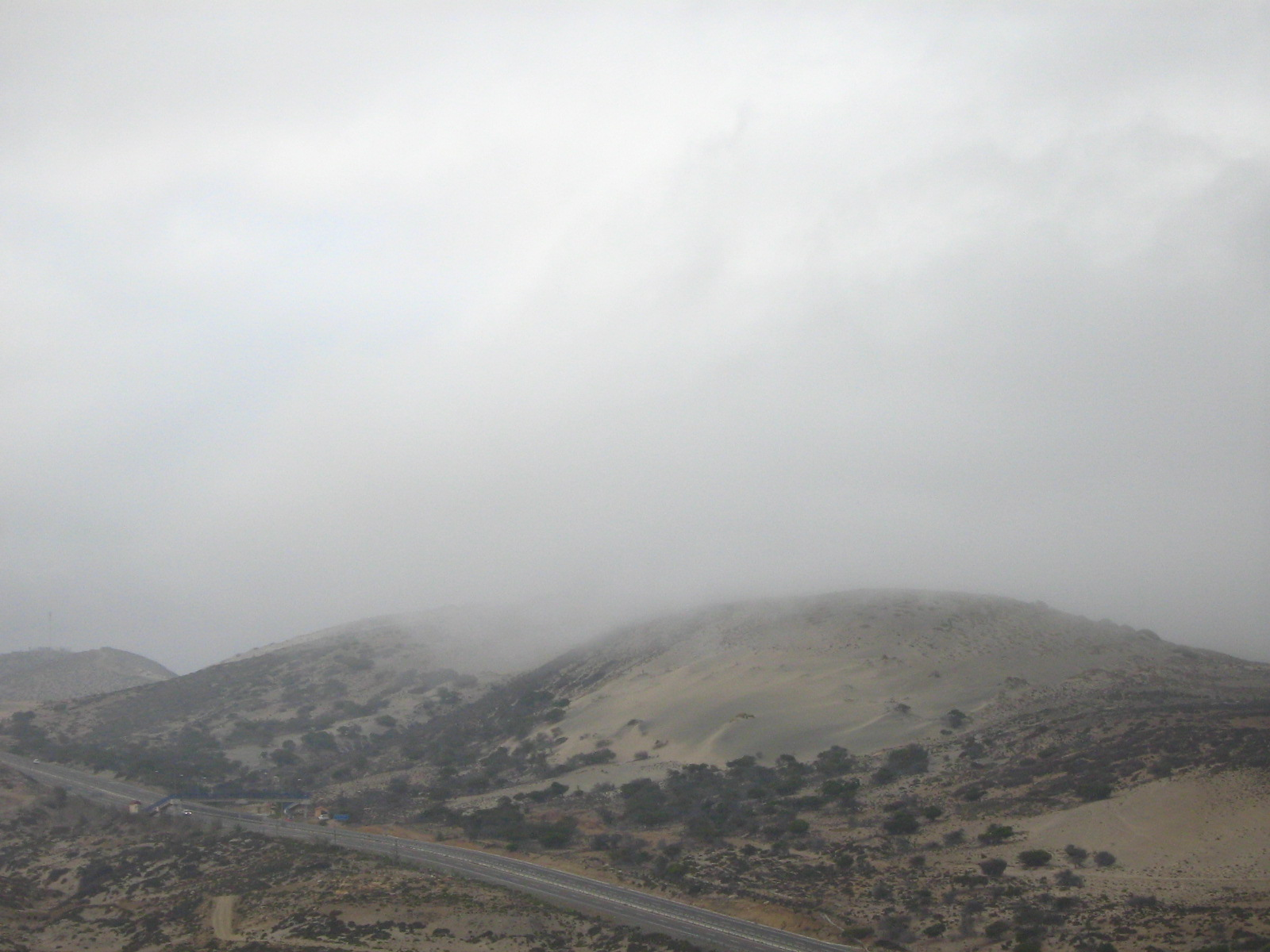
Garúa is similar to camanchaca.

While fog and drizzle are common in many coastal areas around the world, the prevalence and persistence of garúa and its impact on climate and the environment make it unique.

== Formation ==
The cold waters of the Humboldt Current are responsible for both the coastal deserts and the garúa along the coasts of Peru and Chile from latitudes 5° to 30° South, a north-south distance of 2,800 kilometres (1,700 miles). Between those latitudes, the Humboldt Current hugs the coastline bringing mild temperatures and high humidity to a hyper-arid region. The cold waters of the Humboldt create an inversion, the air near the ocean surface being cooler than the air above, contrary to most climatic situations. The trade winds blow the cool air and fog eastward over coastal areas, where the fog coalesces into drizzle and mist, the garúa.

Garúa is a dense fog that does not produce rain. The water droplets in the fog measure between 1 and 40 microns across, too fine to form rain.

== Impact on climate ==
The impact of the Humboldt Current and the garúa it produces is substantial. Lima, Peru near sea level and located at 12° south latitude is in the tropics and would in most climatic situations have average temperatures of 26 °C (79 °F) or higher in every month of the year. By contrast, Lima has monthly average temperatures that range from 23 °C (73 °F) (January through March) in the warmest months and 17 °C (63 °F) in the coolest months of July through September, the months in which the garúa is most frequent.

The impact on sunshine is even more substantial. Annually, only 34 percent of daylight hours in Lima have sunshine. On average, July and August receive less than one hour a day of sunshine. Lima receives only 1,230 hours of sunshine annually. By contrast, London, notoriously cloudy and foggy, gets 1,573 hours of sunshine annually and New York City receives 2,535 hours of sunshine annually. The climate of Lima is typical of the coasts of Peru and northern Chile.

The omnipresent garúa clouds and mist in winter in Lima led the nineteenth-century American author, Herman Melville to call Lima “the strangest, saddest city thou cans’t see.” (Twenty-first century Lima, however, has a flourishing tourist trade and has been described as having a "hidden loveliness.")

The average annual precipitation for most of the 1700-mile north-south desert coast is less than 10 millimetres (0.39 in) and some areas may go without rain for many years. Only the moisture condensed from the garùa clouds -- plus occasional El Niño events -- enables islands of vegetation to be present in the lomas dotted up and down the Peruvian and Chilean coasts. Except for the lomas and river valleys draining the higher and more humid Andes the coastal desert is almost completely barren of vegetation.

The garúa extends only a few kilometers inland, dissipating over land especially where it coalesces against mountain slopes at elevations of 300 metres (980 ft) to 1,000 metres (3,300 ft), the altitudes at which the vegetated lomas are found.

== Fog collection ==
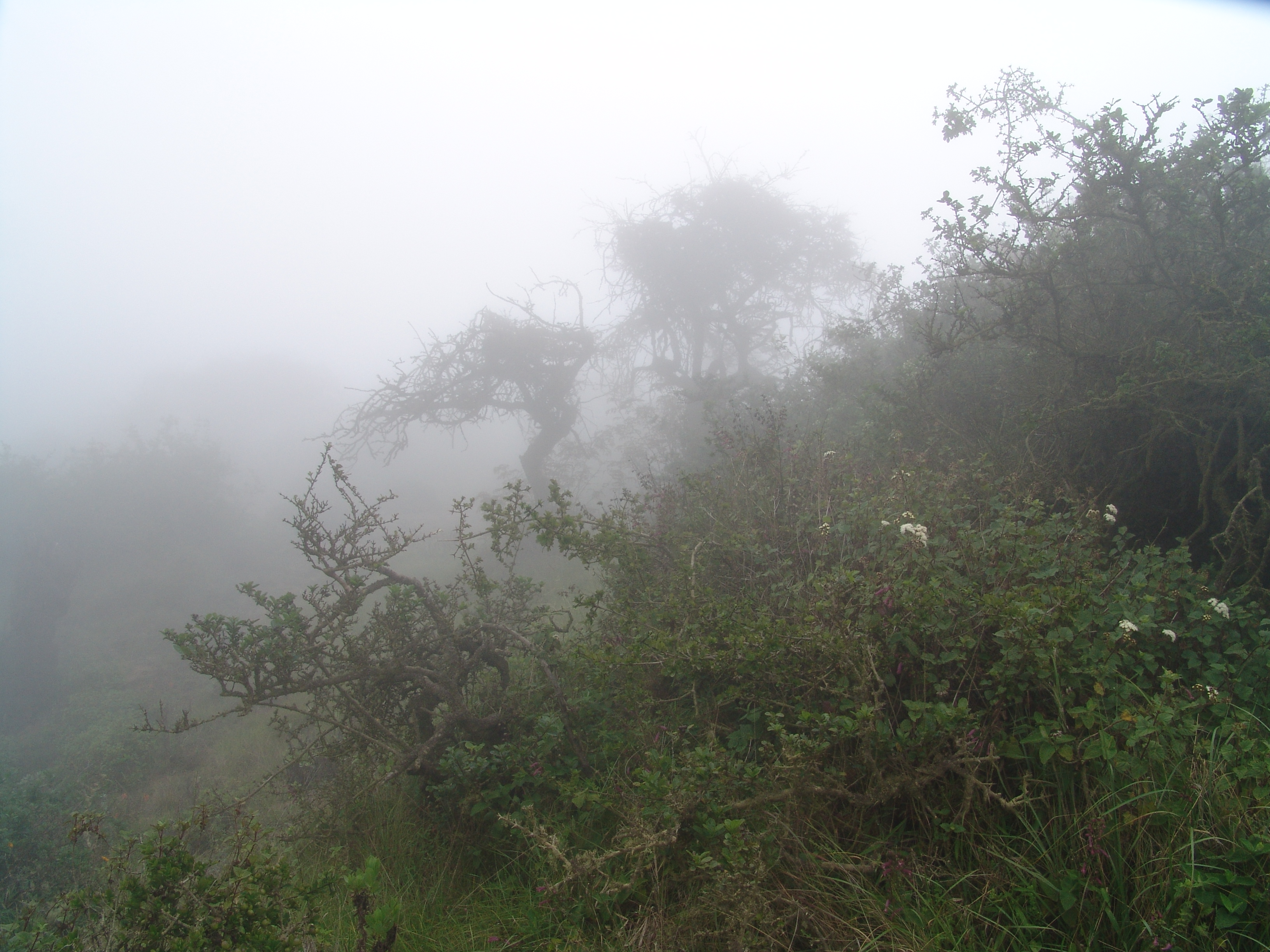
Atiquipa, Peru. The moisture from the garúa is sufficient to permit trees to flourish.

In a water-scarce desert land, water is being captured from the moisture-laden garúa. In Chile, in 1985, scientists devised a fog collection system of polyolefin netting to capture the water droplets in the fog to produce running water for villages in these otherwise desert areas. The Camanchacas Project installed 50 large fog-collecting nets on a mountain ridge, which captured some 2% of the water in the fog.

In 2005, another installation of panels of 3 square metres (32 sq ft) produced 5 litres (1.1 imp gal; 1.3 US gal) per square meter per day.

In Peru, as part of an effort to preserve the fragile ecosystem of the garúa-watered lomas, conservation groups have installed fog-catching nets in the Atiquipa District to capture water and help the 80 families who live within the area to expand agriculture, primarily of olives.

== See also ==
- Fog
- Geography of Peru
