= Desert bloom =

Climatic phenomenon

Coordinates: 27°57′S 70°33′W

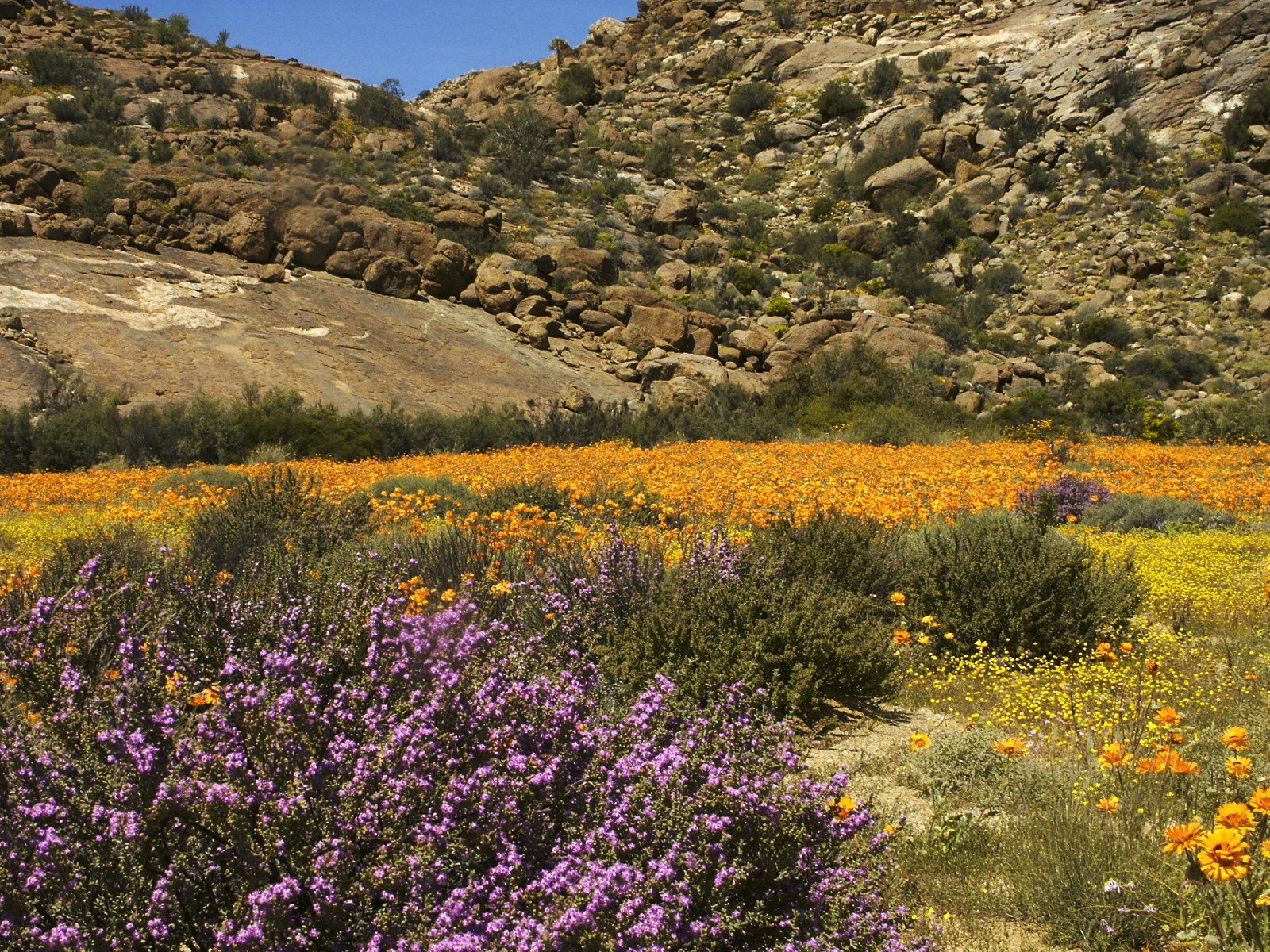
Desert bloom in Namaqualand, South Africa

A desert bloom is a climatic phenomenon that occurs in various deserts around the world. The phenomenon consists of the blossoming of a wide variety of flowers during early-mid spring in years when rainfall is unusually high.

The blossoming occurs when the unusual level of rainfall reaches seeds and bulbs that have been in a latent or dormant state, and causes them to germinate and flower in early spring. It is accompanied by the proliferation of insects, birds and small species of lizards.

== Around the world ==
=== Chile ===
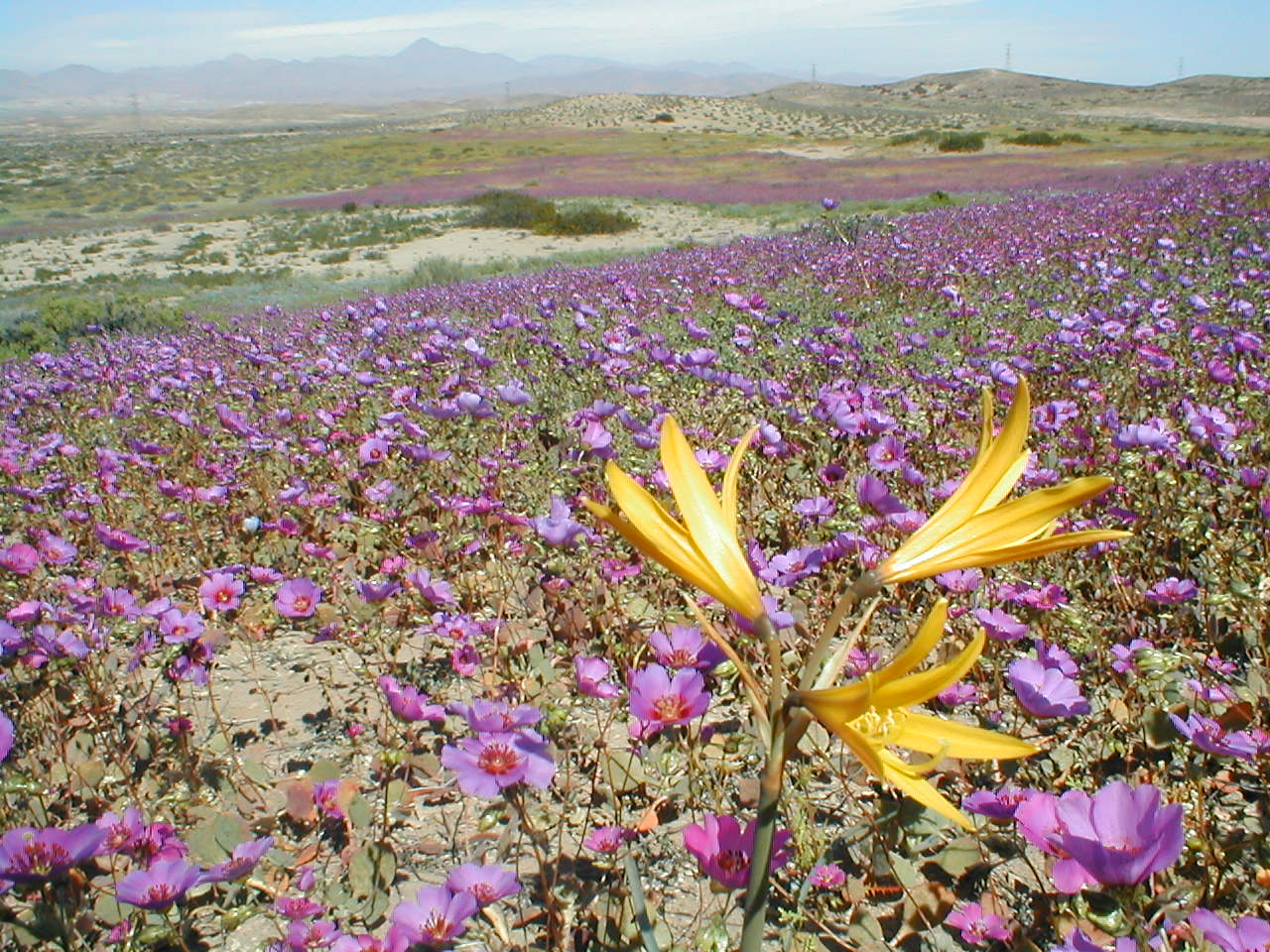
Flowering desert in the Chilean Atacama Desert

In the Atacama Desert, a desert bloom (Spanish: desierto florido) occurs between the months of September and November in years when rainfall is unusually high. Normally, the Atacama Desert receives less than 12 mm (0.47 in) of rain a year.

At its height, the phenomenon can be seen from just south of the city of Vallenar to just north of the city of Copiapó throughout the coastal valleys and Chilean Coast Range from September to November.

Climatically, the event is related to the El Niño phenomenon, a band of anomalously warm ocean water temperatures that occasionally develops off the western coast of South America, which can lead to an increase in evaporation and therefore precipitation.

The flowering desert is a popular tourist attraction with tourists visiting the phenomenon from various points around the southern Atacama, including Huasco, Vallenar, La Serena, Copiapó and Caldera.

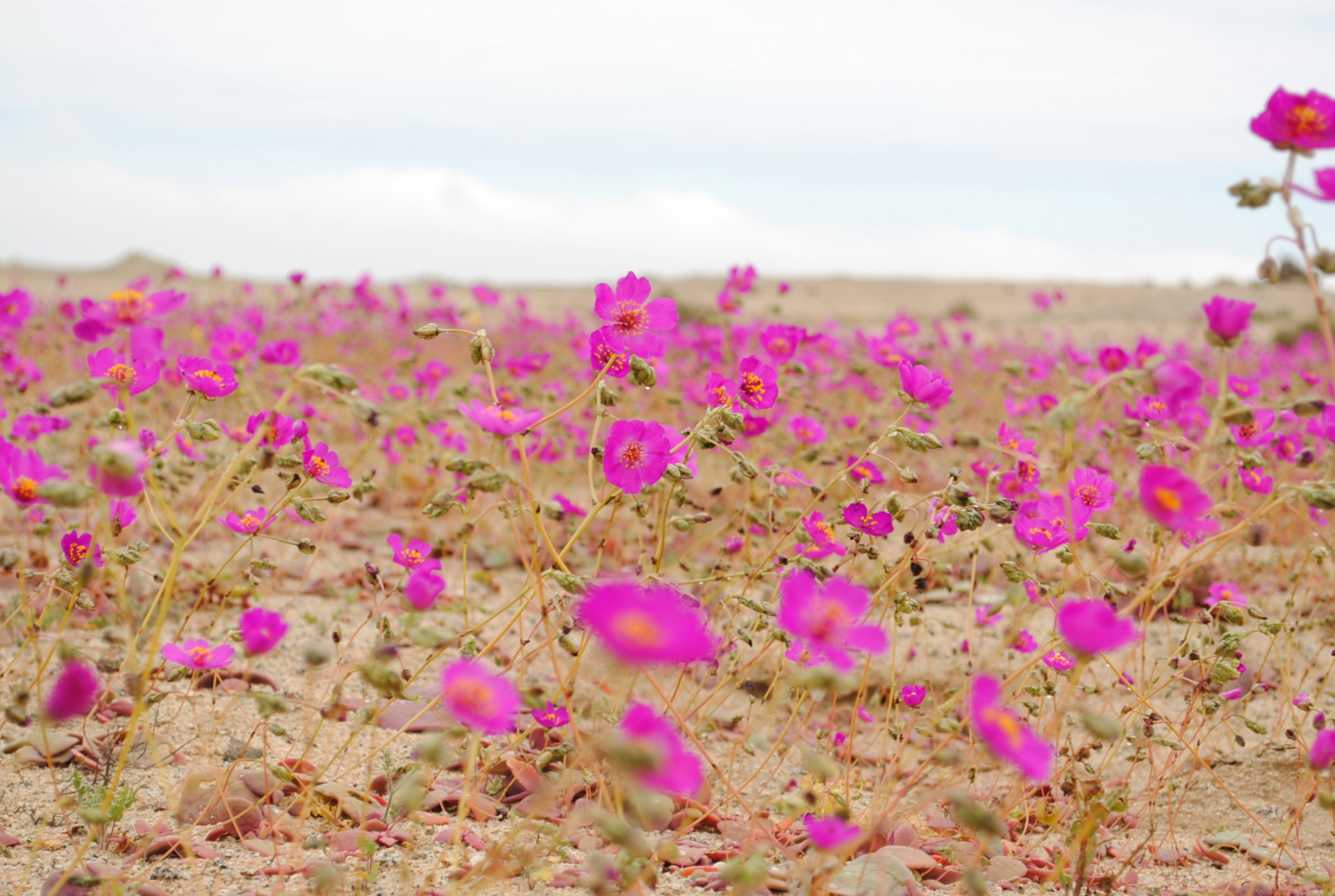
Flowering desert in Barranquilla (2010), Atacama Region

==== Plant and animal life ====
The flowering desert involves more than 200 species of flower, most of them endemic to the Atacama region. The different species germinate at different times through the flowering desert period. Some of the most common species include:

- Garra de león (Bomarea ovallei)
- Pata de guanaco (Cistanthe grandiflora)
- Añañuca (Rhodolirium montanum)
- Schizopetalon tenuifolium

The region is also home to cacti, succulents and other examples of xerophilous plants, as well as animal species including the Tuco-tuco and the Four-Eyed Frog.

==== Conservation ====
In recent years, concerns have been raised by environmental organizations about the potentially damaging effects of large numbers of tourists visiting the flowering desert, the illegal trade of native flower species, and the development of motorsport. Environmental organizations have suggested that these activities limit the potential for regeneration of the existing species. In response to this, the Chilean Government has established a series of prohibitions and controls, in addition to informative campaigns to the public, and especially to tourists, in order to limit the damage. Comisión del Desierto Florido de la Región de Atacama was created in 1997, and re-launched in 2015, by the regional government of Atacama Region as an agency aimed to finds ways to protect the desert bloom.

In June 2022 Copiapó passed a municipal decree establishing fines for those who damage the desert bloom. On October 2, 2022, the Desierto Florido National Park in 2023 was officially announced.

==== Flowering ====
The phenomenon depends on above-average rainfall, but highly excessive rainfall can limit blooming. For example, in 1997 the region experienced very high total rainfall, with 129.4 mm (5.09 in) of rain in Copiapó (978% above average) and 168.5 mm (6.63 in) in Vallenar (433% above average), but there was only minimal desert flowering.

In a single day in March 2015, parts of the area received 23 mm (0.91 in) of rain from El Niño, causing flowering in September and October 2015.

=== Peru ===
In the South and North of Lima, a desert bloom occurs between the months of September and November. The particularity of the Lima desert bloom is that it goes all the way up to the highlands as the clouds get "stuck" and precipitate water. The other particularity is the green moss that appears.

== See also ==
Related to desert blooms in Chile:

- Diaguita
- Transverse Valleys
