= Lachay National Reserve =

Protected area in Peru

- Reserva Nacional de Lachay
- IUCN category VI (protected area with sustainable use of natural resources)
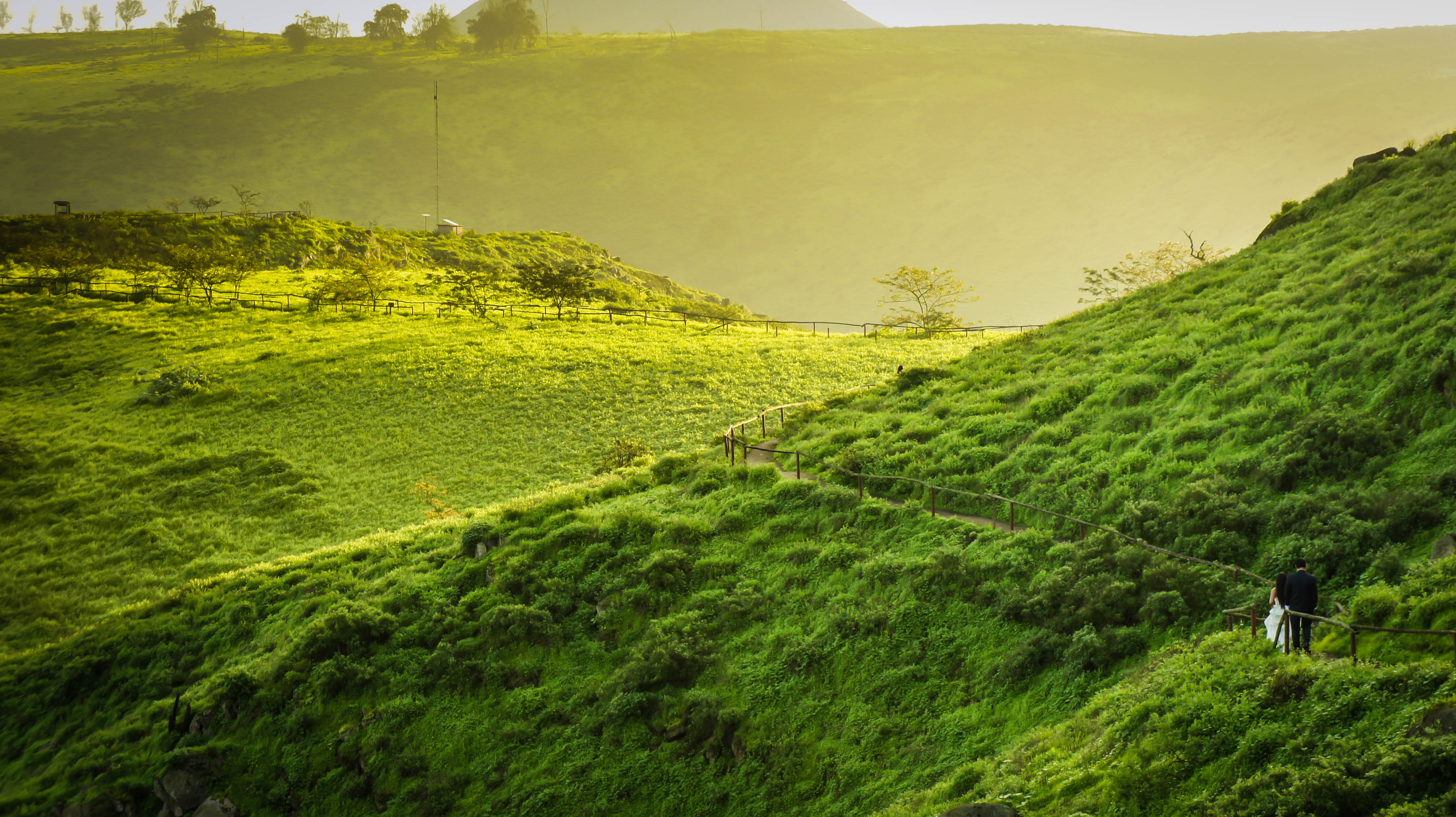
- Wet season at Lachay.

- Location within Peru
- Interactive map of Lachay National Reserve
- Location: Peru; Lima Region
- Nearest city: Huacho
- Coordinates: 11°21′30″S 77°22′10″W
- Area: 5,070 ha (19.6 sq mi)
- Established: June 21, 1977
- Visitors: 30,000 visitors/year (in annual estimate)
- Governing body: SERNANP
- Website: Reserva Nacional de Lachay (in Spanish)

Lachay National Reserve (Spanish: Reserva Nacional de Lachay) is a protected area in the region of Lima, Peru. The reserve is located 105 kilometres (65 mi) north of the Peruvian capital, Lima, and protects part of the lomas ecosystem.

== Climate ==
Climate at the reserve is typical of the lomas: there is a wet season, from June to October (when vegetation develops) and a dry season from January to May (when the landscape is barren).

== Ecology ==
The Lomas ecosystem consists of areas of coastal desert, mostly hills, that receive enough moisture during winter for plant life to thrive, unlike the drought conditions in summer (except for some El Niño events, that bring rains in the summer).

=== Flora ===
Among the native plant species present in the park are: Tara spinosa, Vasconcellea candicans, Ismene amancaes, Verbena litoralis, Vachellia macracantha, Heliotropium arborescens, Armatocereus matucanensis, etc.

=== Fauna ===
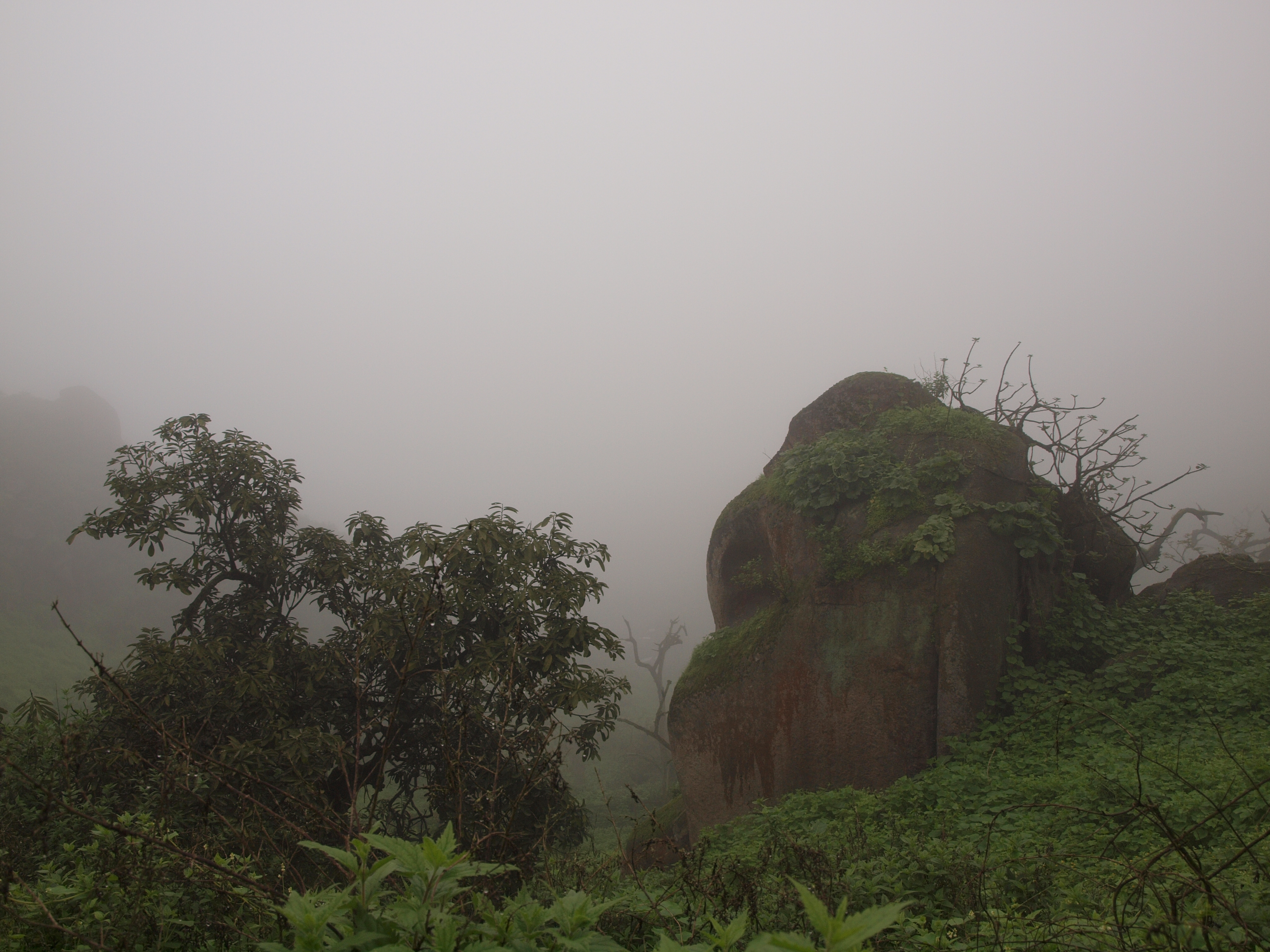
Typical landscape at Lachay in winter.

Some birds found in the reserve are: the Vermilion flycatcher (Pyrocephalus obscurus), the Andean tinamou (Nothoprocta pentlandii), the Black-chested buzzard-eagle (geranoaetus melanoleucus), the American kestrel (Falco sparverius), the Cactus canastero (Asthenes cactorum), the variable hawk (Buteo polyosoma), the burrowing owl (Athene cunicularia), etc.

Some mammals found here are: the Sechuran fox (Lycalopex sechurae), the white-tailed deer (Odocoileus virginianus), occasionally the Pampas cat (Oncifelis colocolo), etc.

== Archaeology ==
Pre-columbian archaeological remains have been found in the reserve such as: human-made terraces, cave paintings, tombs and pieces of pottery. Archaeologists have determined the occupation of Lomas de Lachay, at least seven times, corresponding to initially hunting and gathering populations until reaching the current shepherds, also called "chivateros". There is evidence of the presence of populations influenced by the Chavín Culture (2800 years BC) from the remains of ceramics and buildings found. Likewise, there are remains of tombs that show the presence of the Tiahuanaco Culture, to be exact, between 2500 BC, corresponding to the Theatine period.

The hills also suffered the influence of other great regional cultures such as the Mochica, Chimú and Chancay, to finally be subjected to the Inca Empire. During the colony, the hills were gradually vacated due to the degradation they suffered as a result of overgrazing produced by cattle from Europe. In subsequent historical periods, the hills were deteriorating even more, due to the felling of trees as a source of energy, so that the capacity to support cattle was reduced and this resulted in the sporadic presence of settlers.

== Recreation ==
The main activities in the reserve are birdwatching and hiking. Campsites in the reserve have some amenities like picnic tables, outhouses, parking spots, etc.

== Environmental issues ==
The main environmental issues that threat the integrity of the reserve are: unregulated tourism, firewood extraction, cattle grazing, illegal mining (construction materials), four-wheel drive vehicles outside authorized roads, garbage (not only from visitors, but also from people who toss out garbage from vehicles on the Pan-American highway nearby), invasive species (including stray dogs) and archaeological looting.
