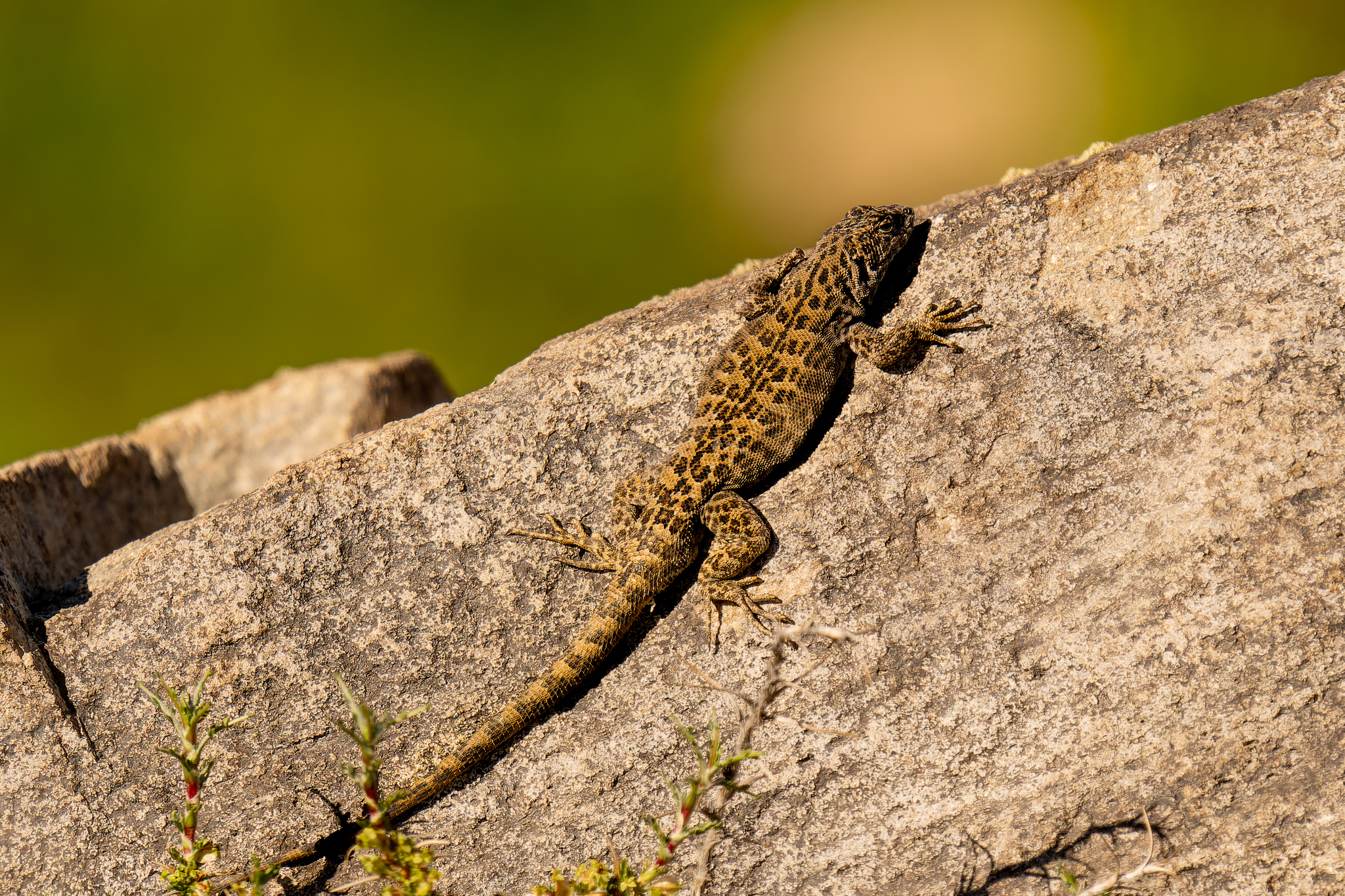

Conservation status
- Endangered (IUCN 3.1)

Scientific classification
- Kingdom: Animalia
- Phylum: Chordata
- Class: Reptilia
- Order: Squamata
- Suborder: Iguania
- Family: Liolaemidae
- Genus: Liolaemus
- Species: L. leopardinus

Binomial name
- Liolaemus leopardinus Müller & Hellmich, 1932

= Liolaemus leopardinus =

Species of lizard

Liolaemus leopardinus (leopard tree iguana) is a species of lizard in the family Liolaemidae. It is endemic to Chile.
