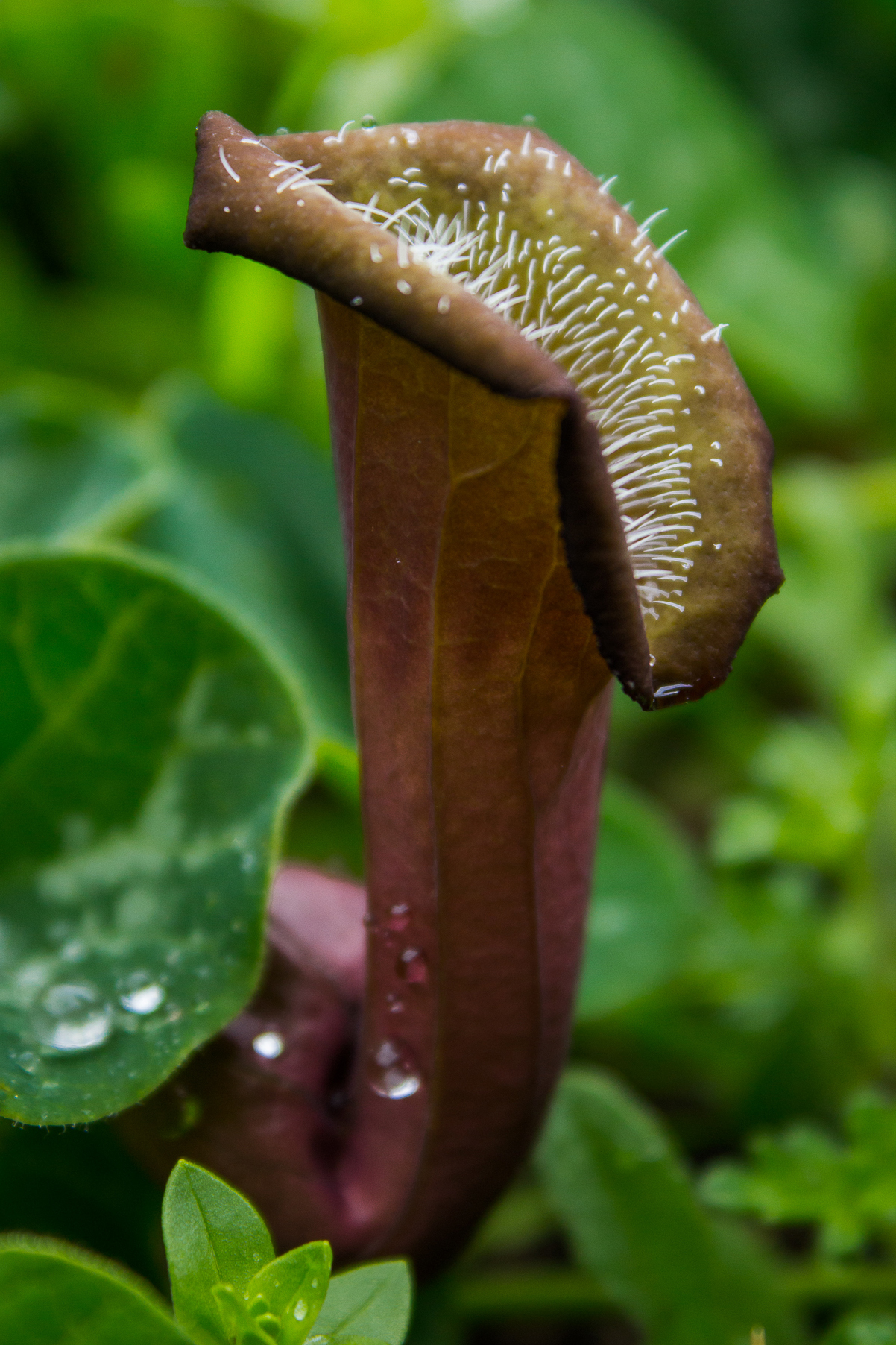

Scientific classification
- Kingdom: Plantae
- Clade: Tracheophytes
- Clade: Angiosperms
- Clade: Magnoliids
- Order: Piperales
- Family: Aristolochiaceae
- Genus: Aristolochia
- Species: A. chilensis

Binomial name
- Aristolochia chilensis Bridges ex Lindl.

= Aristolochia chilensis =

Species of vine

Aristolochia chilensis, known locally as orejas de zorro (fox ears), is a herbaceous perennial plant native to Chile.

== Description ==
A. chilensis is a perennial vine whose stalks can grow to about 1 meter (3.3 ft) in length. The climbing stalks have boomerang-shaped alternate leaves. The flowers may be yellowish or brownish-purple in color, and emit an unpleasant odor that attracts the flies which pollinate it. Retorse (downward-pointing) hairs on the flower, similar to those of pitcher plants, impede the departure of the flies. Once trapped within the utricule (a sac-like structure of the flower), pollen from the stamens is deposited on the flies; pollen they brought with them is deposited on the stigmata as they enter. Within the flower, they are sustained by nectaries for a day, while the stamens ripen and the flower withers. This releases tension in the retorse hairs and frees the flies. The flower usually grows between 15–30 cm (6–12 in) tall with the scrambling vines growing to about 1 meter (3 feet).

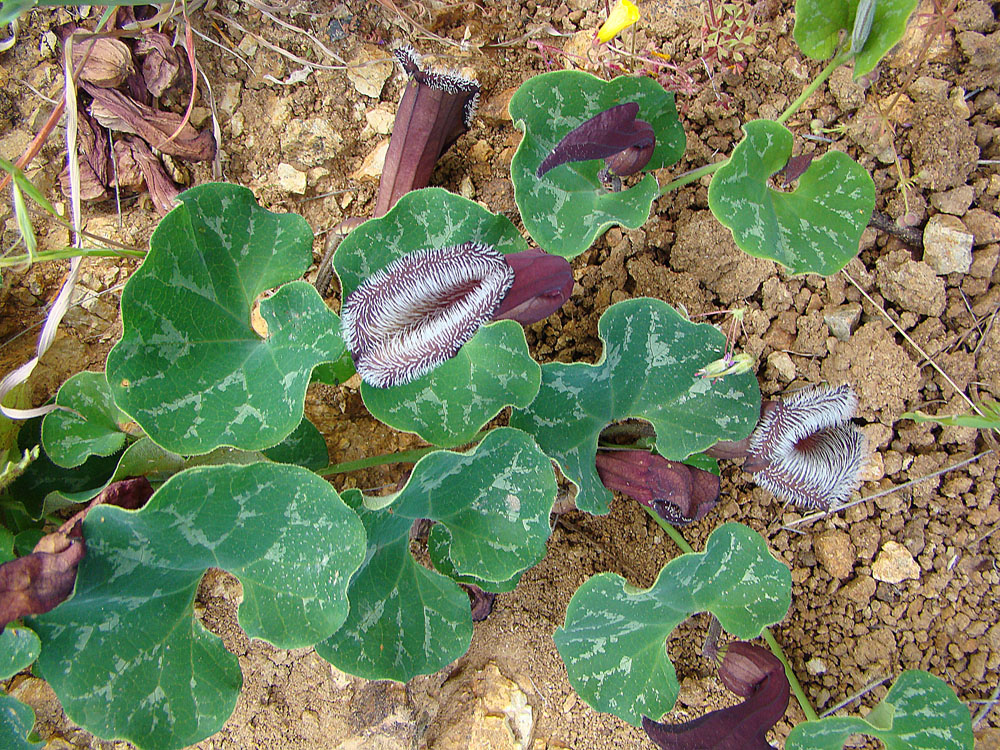
Aristolochia chilensis hairs (close up)

== Distinguishing characteristics ==
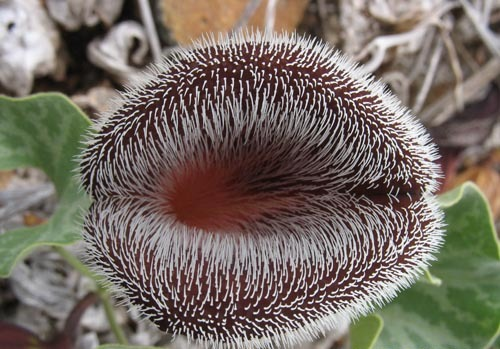
Aristolochia chilensis flower with downward pointing hairs

Members of the genus Aristolochia are known for fly pollination and are similar to pitcher plants and flytraps. The main difference is that those plants digest the insects for nutrients, while the Aristolochia use them mainly for pollination. Every part of the plant is also poisonous if ingested by humans or animals. Caterpillars and the swallowtail butterfly actually feed on the leaves, flowers, and shoots of the plant. Caterpillars can especially tolerate the acids contained within the plant and, in turn, cause them to become poisonous to predators. The plant is also zygomorphic and usually has foetid flowers to attract pollinators (flies) while repelling predators. The aroma of the flower especially helps with its survival.

== Environment and habitat ==
This plant is only native to Chile and is found in low-altitude valleys and coastal mountains. They tend to be found in coastal areas from 0–500 meters and mountains from 500 to 2000 meters in altitude. They thrive in very dry areas with little to no rainfall and can tolerate droughts. They also thrive on full exposure to sunlight and grow only on level or northern-facing slopes. The plant can not handle snow but can tolerate brief freezing spells of approximately −5 °C, the approximate temperature of the morning frost in Chile. They also need adequate drainage to mature properly.

== Ecology ==
Aristolochia chilensis, like the related Aristolochia bridgesii, is a larval food source for the gold rim swallowtail butterfly, Battus polydamas.

== Uses and chemical components ==
Aristolochia chilensis has ornamental and medicinal value and has also yielded the new 4-aryltetralone (−)-aristotetralone. Being in the family Aristolochiaceae, Aristolochia chilensis contain aristolochic acid. This has typically been used in traditional Chinese medicine to help with ailments from mouth ulcers to arthritis. However, the use of this acid for medicinal purposes has been banned in Europe since 2001 and in China in 2003 due to studies showing that the acids are carcinogenic, mutagenic, and nephrotoxic, thus causing much more harm than good. Although they do not smell pleasant, they are often used for groundcovers in xeriscaping.
