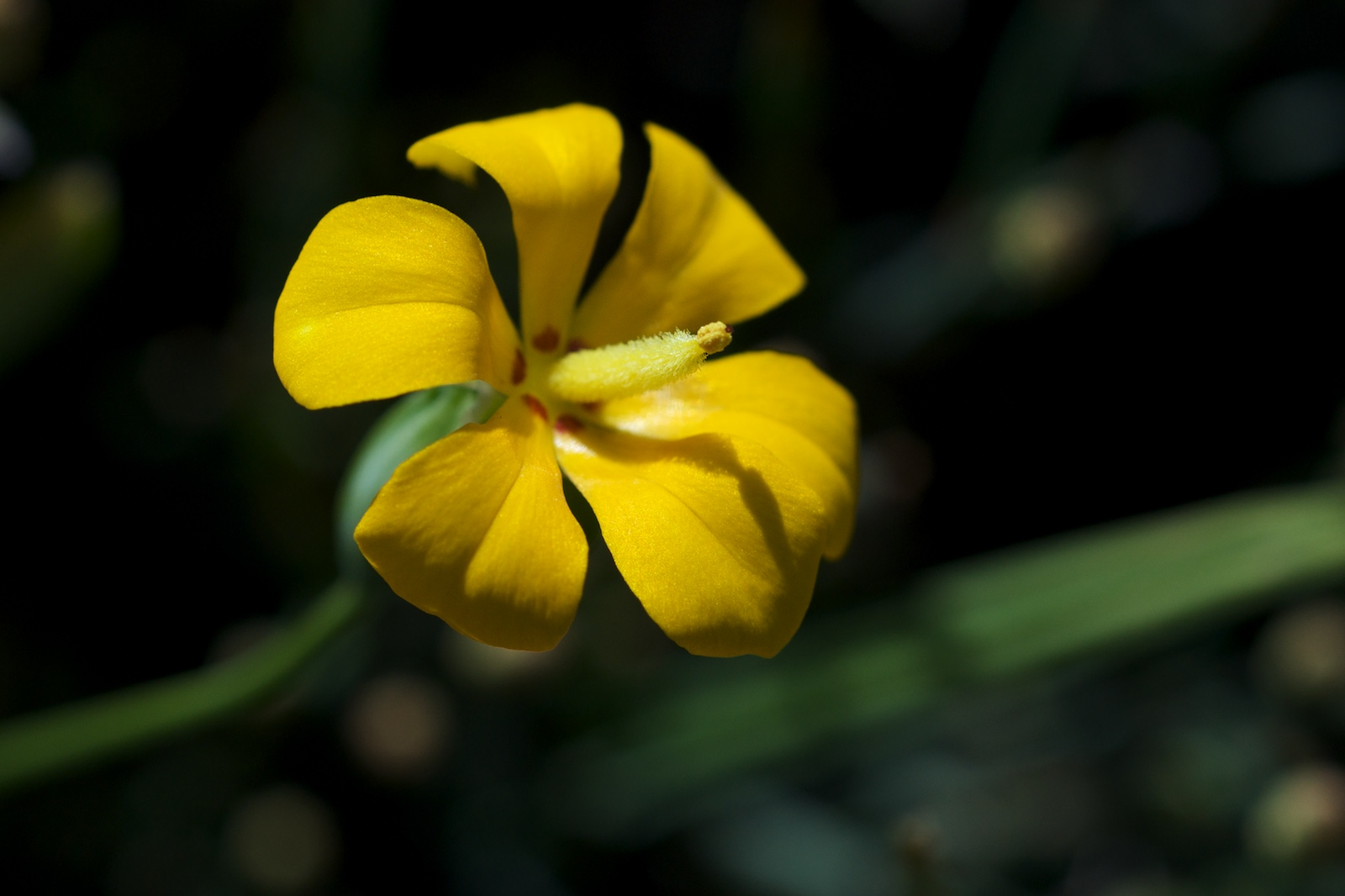

Scientific classification
- Kingdom: Plantae
- Clade: Tracheophytes
- Clade: Angiosperms
- Clade: Monocots
- Order: Asparagales
- Family: Iridaceae
- Genus: Solenomelus
- Species: S. pedunculatus

Binomial name
- Solenomelus pedunculatus (Gillies ex Hook.) Hochr.

Synonyms
- List: Cruckshanksia graminea Miers nom. inval.; Sisyrinchium longistylum Lem.; Sisyrinchium pedunculatum Gillies ex Hook.; Sisyrinchium scabriusculum Steud. nom. inval.; Solenomelus chilensis Miers; Solenomelus punctatus Miers

= Solenomelus pedunculatus =

Species of plant

Solenomelus pedunculatus is a common species of flowering plants of the genus Solenomelus that is native to the Chilean Andes. It has grass-like leaves that are greyish green growing in a clump and a succession of short-lived deep yellow flowers on a zip-zag stalk.

== Anatomy ==
Solenomelus pedunculatus is a perennial that grows to about 40 cm in height. It has grass-like leaves that are greyish green growing in a clump and a succession of short-lived deep yellow flowers with 6 petals on a zip-zag stalk.

== Habitat ==
Solenomelus pedunculatus grows at low altitude in interior valleys of coastal mountains (500 – 2000 m). It is predominantly found in humid areas, with almost constant rainfall. Short dry periods are possible (generally not longer than 1 month). During dry summers the leaves die back much like Sisyrinchium bellum, but return when it starts raining in the autumn. It can be found in somewhat dry areas where the drought may last 3 – 5 months. Precipitations of 400 – 800 mm are concentrated in winter. It cannot tolerate snow but can survive freezing down to -5 °C. S. pedunculatus prefers some shadow and protection against direct sunlight from vegetation, filtering about 20 - 80% of light.
