= Norte Chico =

Norte Chico (Spanish: Small North) may refer to:

- Norte Chico civilization, an ancient Peruvian civilization.
- Norte Chico, Peru, the Peruvian north-central coast of the Lima Region, specifically the Huaura, Huaral and Barranca provinces.
- Norte Chico, Chile
- One of three fictitious "barbarian" chieftains in the 2008 video game Civilization Revolution
