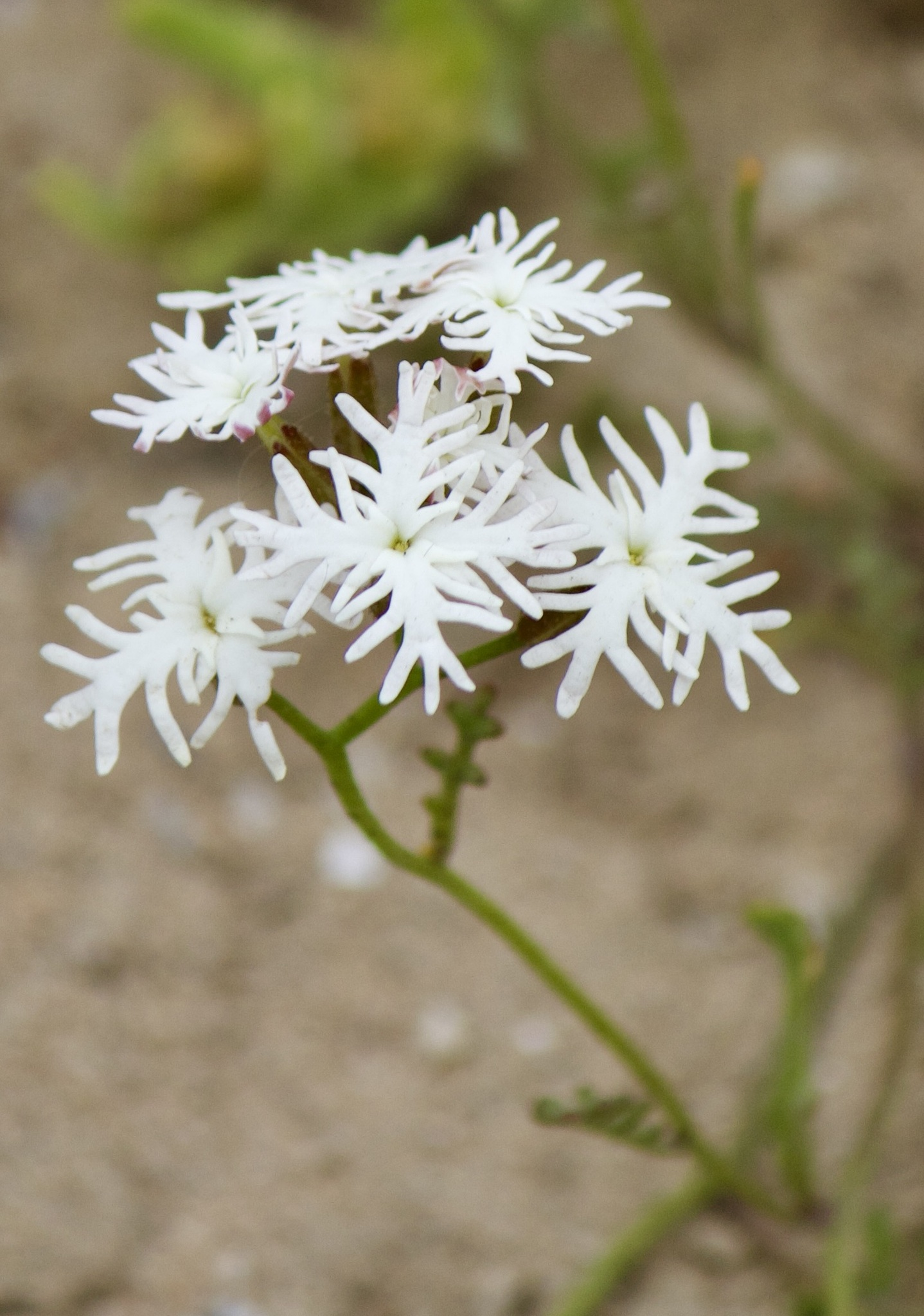
- Schizopetalon maritimum in Chile

Scientific classification
- Kingdom: Plantae
- Clade: Tracheophytes
- Clade: Angiosperms
- Clade: Eudicots
- Clade: Rosids
- Order: Brassicales
- Family: Brassicaceae
- Genus: Schizopetalon; Sims

Species
- See text

Synonyms
- Perreymondia Barnéoud; Schizopetalum DC., orth. var.

= Schizopetalon =

Genus of plants

Schizopetalon is a genus of plants in the family Brassicaceae.

It is native to western South America. Schizopetalon tenuifolium is found in the Atacama Desert of northern Chile.

== Species ==
As of July 2024, Plants of the World Online accepts these species:

- Schizopetalon arcuatum Al-Shehbaz
- Schizopetalon bipinnatifidum Phil.
- Schizopetalon biseriatum Phil.
- Schizopetalon brachycarpum Al-Shehbaz
- Schizopetalon corymbosum Al-Shehbaz
- Schizopetalon dentatum (Barnéoud) Gilg & Muschl.
- Schizopetalon maipoanum Ravenna
- Schizopetalon maritimum Barnéoud
- Schizopetalon rupestre Reiche
- Schizopetalon tenuifolium Phil.
- Schizopetalon walkeri Sims — small annual plant, having deeply pinnatifid leaves and racemes of fringed almond-scented purple-white flowers.
