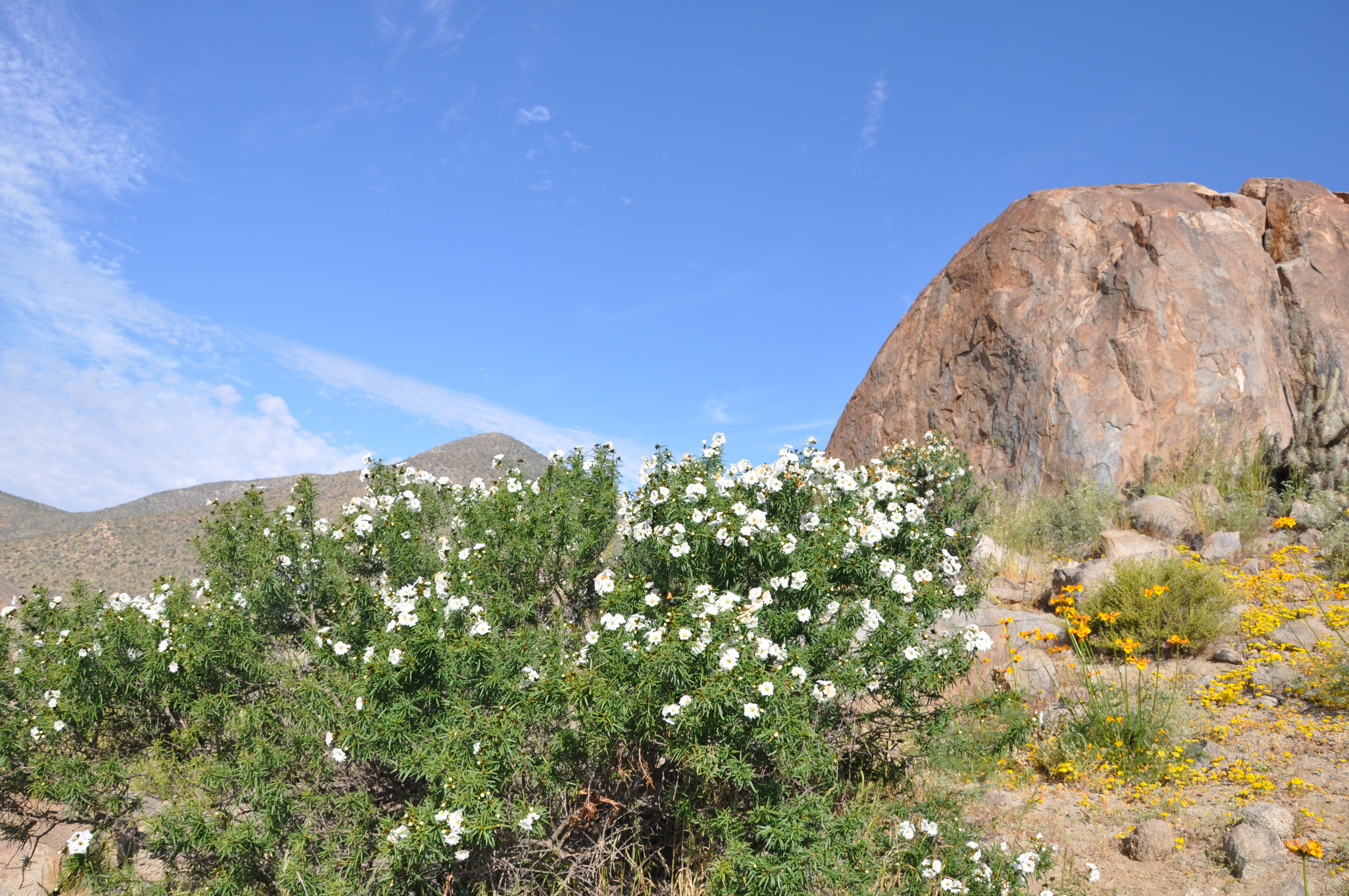
- Flowering in Cuesta La Totora, Freirina.

Conservation status
- Near Threatened (IUCN 3.1)

Scientific classification
- Kingdom: Plantae
- Clade: Tracheophytes
- Clade: Angiosperms
- Clade: Eudicots
- Clade: Asterids
- Order: Boraginales
- Family: Cordiaceae
- Genus: Cordia
- Species: C. decandra

Binomial name
- Cordia decandra Hook. & Arn.

= Cordia decandra =

Species of flowering plant

Cordia decandra, commonly known in Spanish as carbón and carbonillo, is a species of woody plant in the family Cordiaceae. It is a native shrub in the southern reaches of the Atacama Desert in Chile. More specifically, it grows mainly in the dry hills of the Atacama and Coquimbo Regions, and is not known to grow south of latitude 30 S. It grows from sea-level up to 1,500 m AMSL. It produces a small edible fruit that can be eaten dry or toasted.
