= Camanchaca =

Marine stratocumulus cloud banks that form in Chile

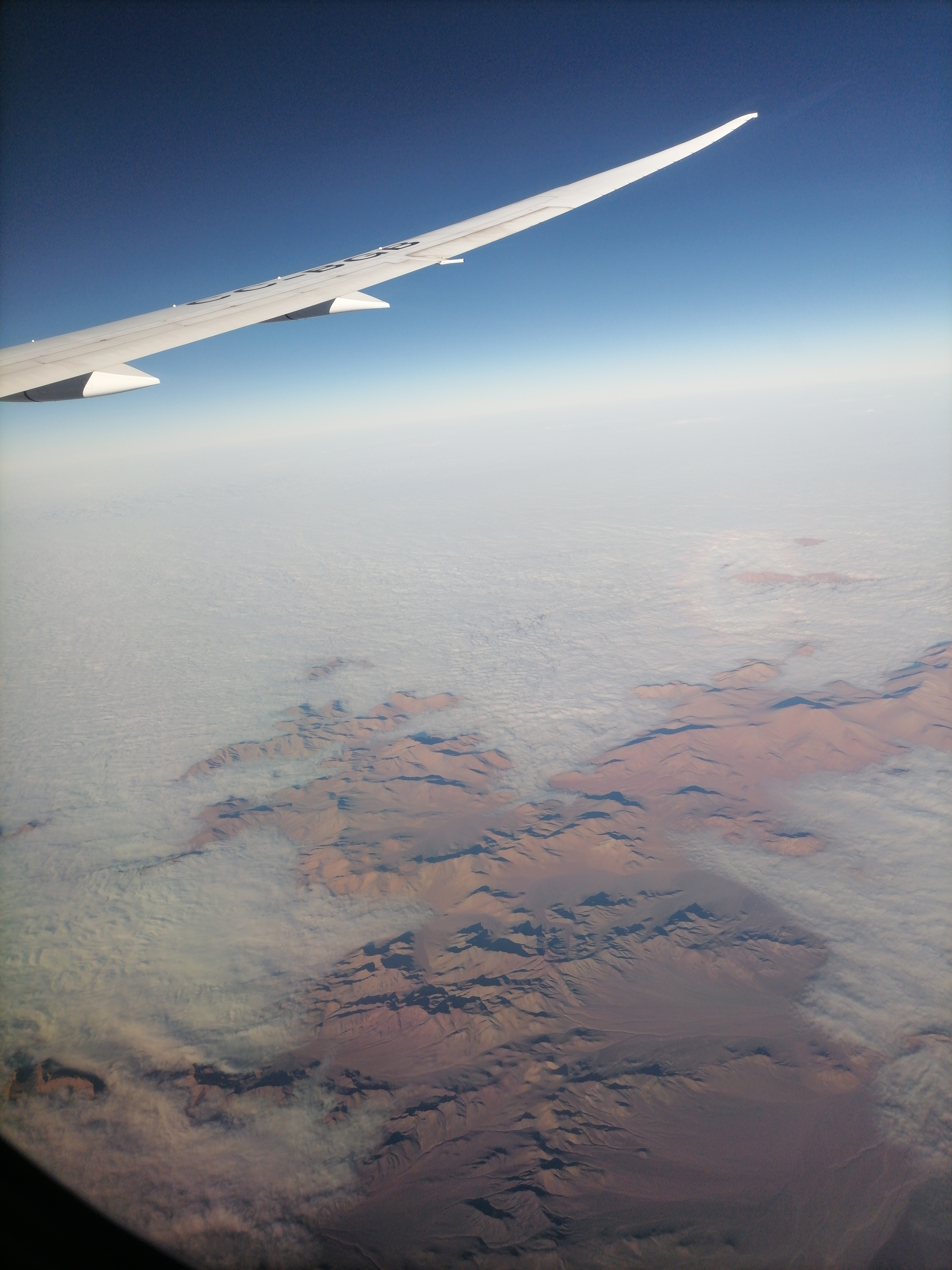
The camanchaca, mist over the Atacama Desert, Chile.

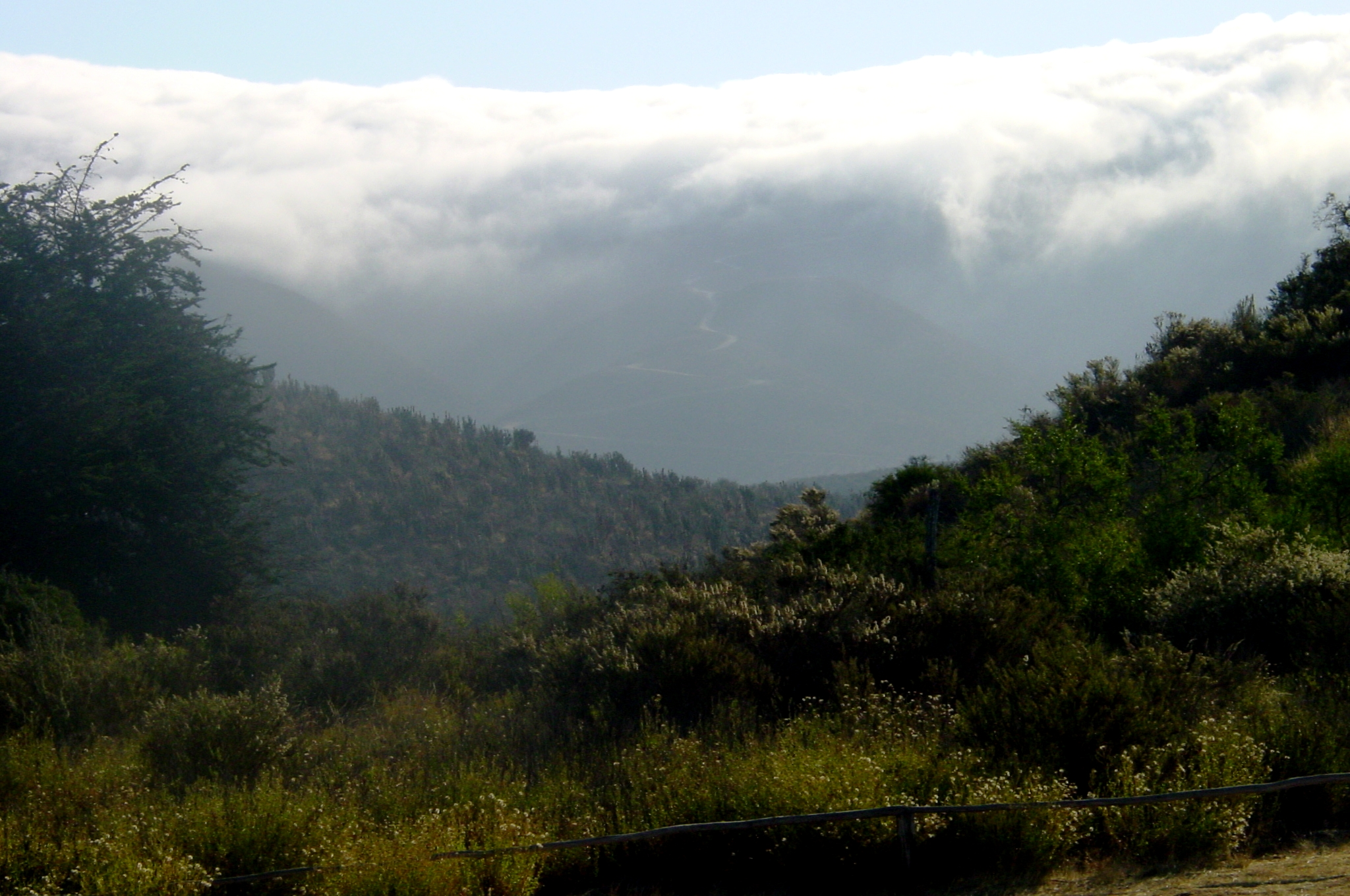
Camanchaca in Bosque de Fray Jorge National Park

Camanchacas are marine stratocumulus cloud banks that form on the Chilean coast, proximal to the Earth's driest desert, the Atacama Desert, and move inland. In Peru, a similar fog is called garúa, and in Angola cacimbo. On the side of the mountains where these cloud banks form, the camanchaca is a dense fog that does not produce rain. The moisture that makes up the cloud measure between 1 and 40 microns across, too fine to form rain droplets.

== Fog collection ==
In 1985, scientists devised a fog collection system of polyolefin netting to capture the water droplets in the fog to produce running water for villages in these otherwise desert areas. The Camanchacas Project installed 50 large fog-collecting nets on a mountain ridge, which capture some 2% of the water in the fog.

In 2005, another installation of panels of 3 square metres (32 sq ft) producing 5 litres (1.1 imp gal; 1.3 US gal) per square meter per day.
