= 2005 Tarapacá earthquake =

Earthquake in northern Chile

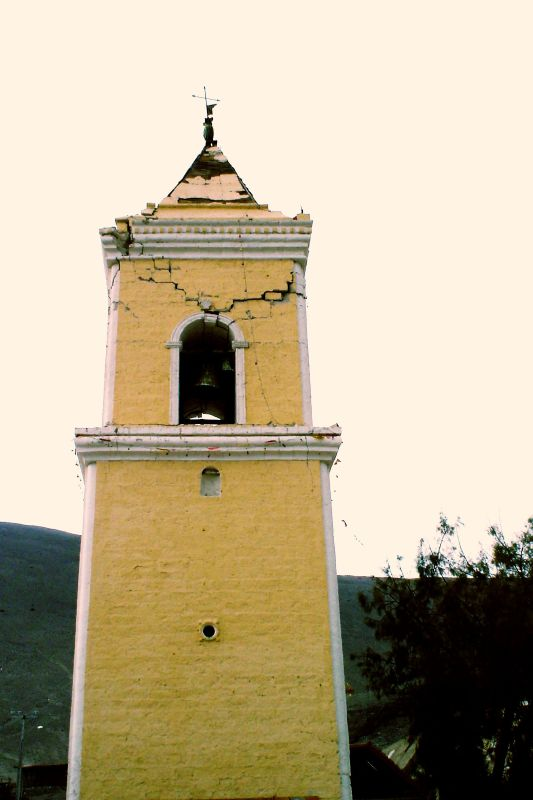
- The damaged church of San Lorenzo de Tarapacá after the earthquake

- Location within South America
- UTC time: 2005-06-13 22:44:33
- ISC event: 7143508
- USGS-ANSS: ComCat
- Local date: June 13, 2005
- Local time: 18:44:33 CLT (UTC-4)
- Magnitude: M_{w} 7.8
- Depth: 115.6 km (71.8 mi)
- Epicenter: 19°59′13″S 69°11′49″W
- Areas affected: Chile, Bolivia, Peru
- Total damage: US$40 million (equivalent to $65.9 million in 2025)
- Max. intensity: MMI IX (Violent)–MMI X (Extreme)
- Peak acceleration: 0.792 g
- Landslides: Yes
- Aftershocks: c.2,000 (by July 2005)
- Casualties: 11 dead, 200 injured

On June 13, 2005, at 22:44:33 CLT, a M_{w} 7.8 earthquake struck near Mamiña, in northern Chile about 125 km east-northeast of Iquique, affecting the Tarapacá and Arica y Parinacota Regions, as well as adjacent parts of Bolivia and Peru. It had a maximum felt intensity of IX (Violent) to X (Extreme) on the Mercalli intensity scale. The earthquake killed at least 11 people, injured 200 others and damaged or destroyed over 9,300 houses. The towns of Huara and Tarapacá were almost completely destroyed, and other towns in the epicentral were largely heavily damaged.

== Tectonic setting ==
Chile lies above the destructive plate boundary, where the Nazca Plate is being subducted beneath the South American Plate. In the Tarapacá region the plates converge at a rate of 78 mm per year. This boundary is associated with many large earthquakes, both along the plate interface and within the subducting slab (Nazca Plate).

== Earthquake ==
The earthquake was an intermediate-depth event, with a hypocentral depth of 115.6 km (71.8 mi). The United States Geological Survey (USGS) recorded a moment magnitude (M_{w}) of 7.8, while the National Seismological Center of the University of Chile put the magnitude at 7.9 on the Richter magnitude scale (M_{L}). Its epicenter was located in the commune of Pozo Almonte in Tamarugal Province, Tarapacá Region, 10 km (6.2 mi) east-northeast of Mamiña and 102 km (63 mi) east-northeast of Iquique. The focal mechanism corresponded to normal faulting, with a rupture on either a steep-dipping, north-striking fault or on a shallow-dipping, south-striking fault. Of these two possible fault orientations, finite-fault modeling of globally recorded seismic data is more consistent with slip on the south-striking fault. A rupture area of 110 km (68 mi) x 70 km (43 mi) was estimated, extending from Chiapa in the north to Pica in the south, with a maximum slip of 7.528 m (24.70 ft) at the epicenter. The observed source time function gives a 120 second duration for the earthquake, with the greatest phase of seismic moment release occurring about 40 seconds after initiation. Approximately 2,000 aftershocks were detected within a month of the earthquake.

On the Modified Mercalli intensity scale (MMI), a maximum intensity of IX–X (Violent–Extreme) was estimated in the towns of Huara, Tarapacá and Pachica, while in Bolivia, a maximum intensity of MMI VIII (Severe) was felt in the Salar de Uyuni salt flat. The MMI also reached VI–VII (Strong–Very strong) in Iquique, Calama and Tocopilla, V (Moderate) in Arica, and IV–V (Light–Moderate) in Arequipa and Tacna, Peru. A maximum peak ground acceleration (pga) of 0.792 g was recorded at Pica.

== Impact ==
The earthquake killed 11 people, including a family of six who where killed after a boulder struck their vehicle near Iquique, three in Huara and two in Pozo Almonte. In addition, more than 200 others were injured, 550 homes were destroyed and 8,800 more were damaged in northern Chile. Parts of southern Peru and western Bolivia were also affected. Adobe houses throughout the Andes were particularly affected, with more than 80% destroyed in some villages. The towns of Huara and Tarapacá were the worst-affected, with almost all homes destroyed. Economic losses amounted to US$40 million. Despite Chile's abundance of earthquake-resistant structures, many homes in the epicentral region were constructed with lower-quality materials, such as adobe and unreinforced masonry, with led to many of them collapsing completely. Landslides were also widespread, primarily near the epicenter and coastal areas.

Almost all churches were damaged in areas exposed to strong shaking, even in communities that remained otherwise largely unscathed by the earthquake. Partial or complete structural collapses occurred at churches in Huara, Iquique, Pozo Almonte, Camiña, Moquella, Chiapa, Sibaya, Mocha, Pachica. The earthquake left 30 electric substations out of service, which cut off water supply to the epicentral area. Transportation infrastructure in the region was also severely damaged, primarily due to landslides throughout the Tarapacá Region, including a few blocking sections of the Pan-American Highway. In Iquique, the breakwater at the city's port was severely damaged, while damage elsewhere in the city was relatively minor, although some houses and shopfronts collapsed. The Chilean Red Cross building received minor infrastructural damage and loss of equipment.

In southern Peru, approximately 30 homes were damaged and adobe walls collapsed in the department of Tacna. A large landslide blocked a highway connecting Tacna to Palca District, with rockfalls blocking other roads in the area. The department of Moquegua recorded minor damage to buildings and a few rockfalls blocking roads along the Ilo-Desaguadero highway and tunnels along the Pan-American Highway.

== Aftermath ==
Initial efforts concentrated on repairing infrastructure affected by the earthquake. By June 2006 the government reported that most of the repairs to roads and irrigation canals were complete, but that, although work had started on repairing houses and schools. The effects of this earthquake on pregnant women were used to investigate the effects of acute stress on child development. The results showed that amongst poorer families, children affected by the earthquake in utero were at least six months behind in cognitive development seven years later compared to their peers in a control group in areas unaffected by the earthquake.

== See also ==
- 2007 Tocopilla earthquake
- 2007 Aysen Fjord earthquake
- 2007 Peru earthquake
- Great Chilean earthquake
- List of earthquakes in 2005
- List of earthquakes in Chile
- List of earthquakes in Peru
