= Mauque =

Town in Chile

Coordinates: 19°19′21″S 68°52′50″W

- Town
- Mauque
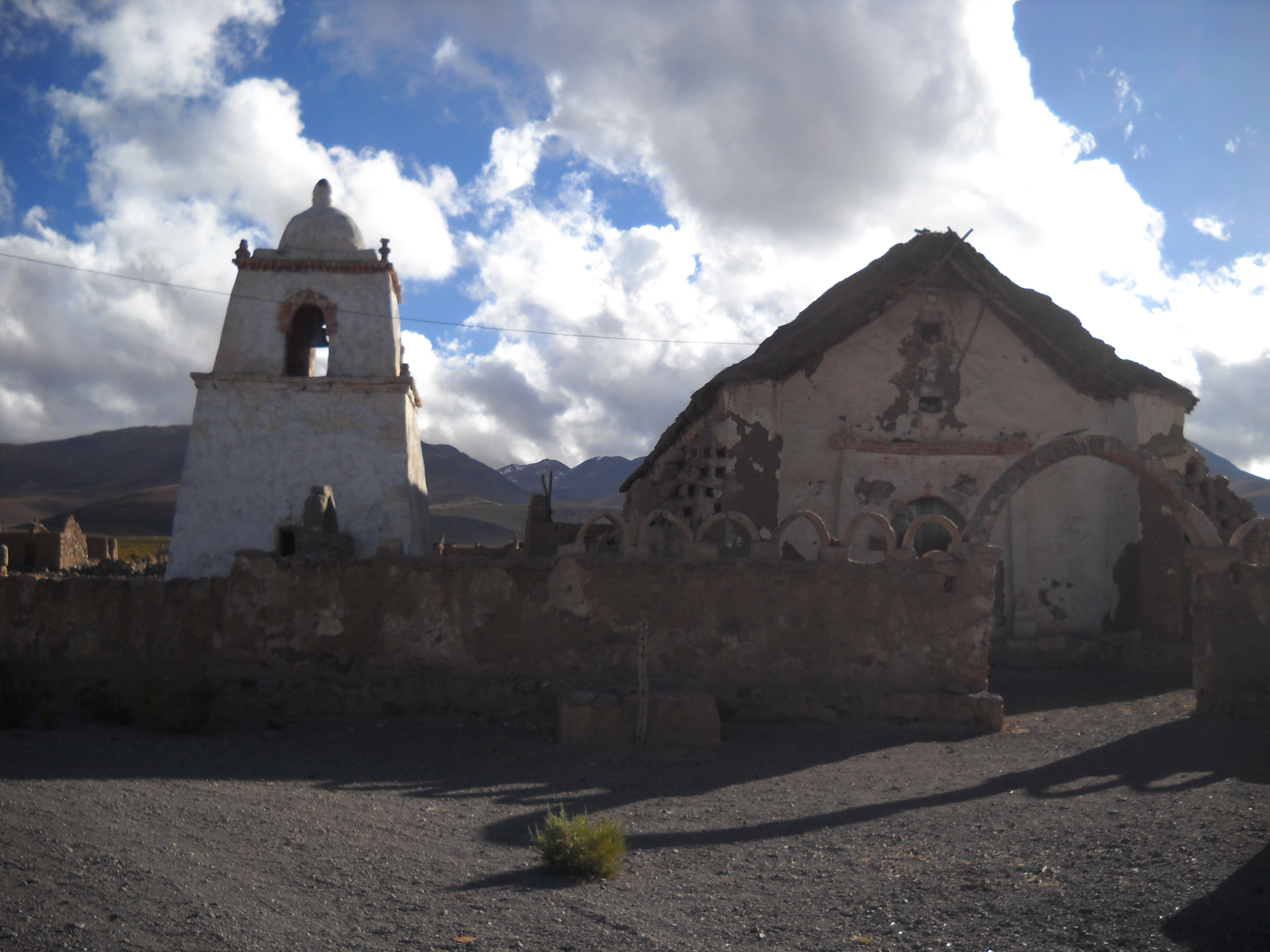

- Coordinates: 19 ° 19′20 ″ S 68 ° 52′50 ″ W
- Country: Chile
- Region: Tarapacá Region
- Province: El Tamarugal

Mauque is a Chilean town. It is a highland Aymara town, located in the commune of Colchane, province of Tamarugal, in the Tarapacá Region, Chile. It is located within the area of the Volcán Isluga National Park, in the Chiapa river ravine. The term Mauque comes from the Quechua mauca meaning old man or old man's face, as indicated by Francisco Rizo Patrón in his Geographical Dictionary of the Provinces of Tacna and Tarapacá. Mauque may also come from the Aymara kawki which means wild fruit.
