= Huaviña =

Town in Chilean

- Town
- Huaviña
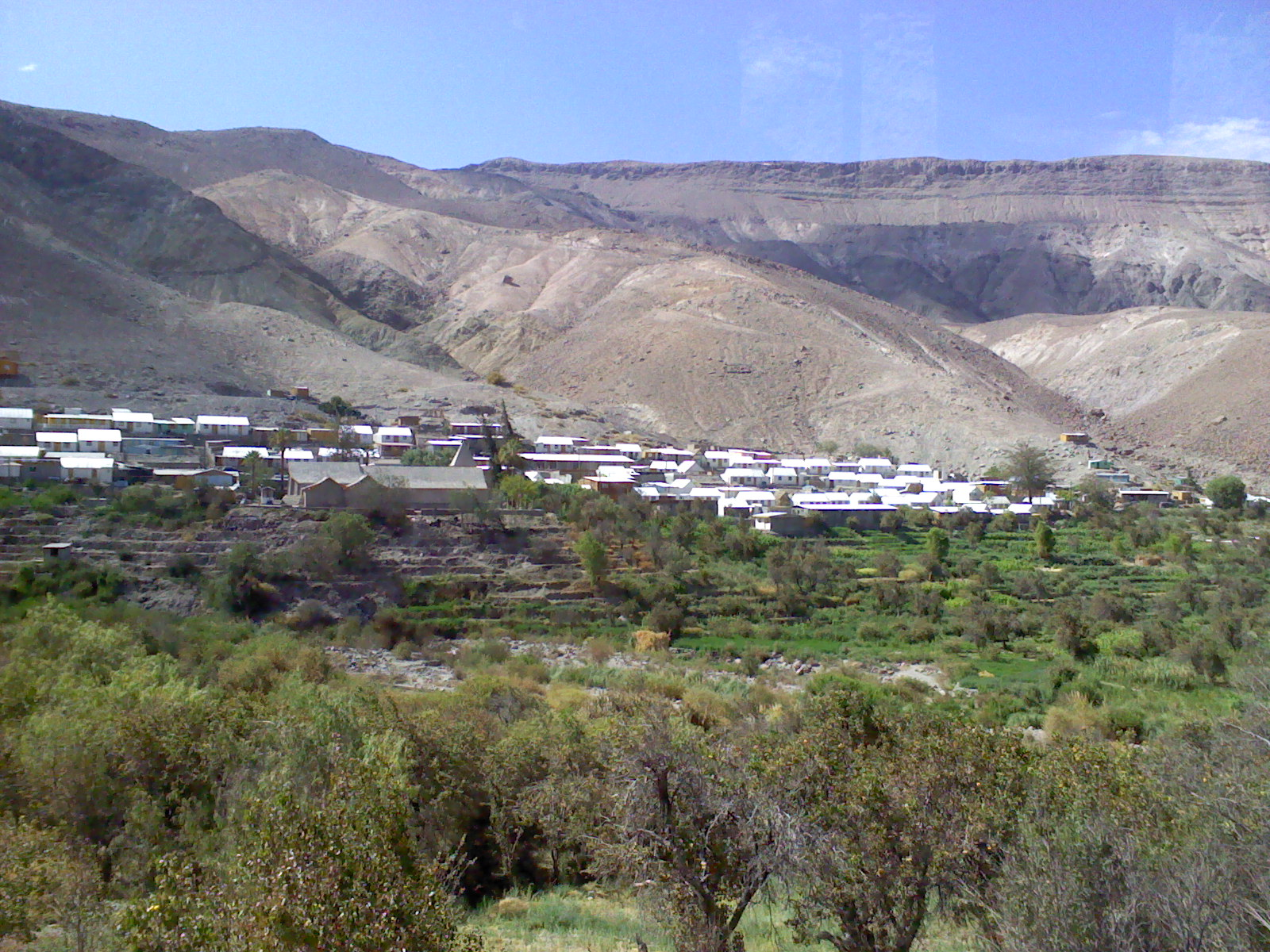

- Location in Chile
- Coordinates: 19°47′43″S 69°13′22″W
- Country: Chile
- Region: Tarapacá Region
- Province: El Tamarugal

Huaviña is a Chilean town. The town is located in the foothills of the commune of Huara in a canyon known as Quebrada de Tarapacá. It is located 80 km from the seat of the municipality and 153 kilometers from Iquique. Its main economic activities are agriculture and livestock.
