= Chiapa (Chile) =

Town in Chile

Coordinates: 19°32′12″S 69°12′22″W

- Town
- Chiapa
- Coat of arms
- Interactive map of Chiapa
- Country: Chile
- Region: Tarapacá Region
- Province: El Tamarugal

Chiapa (in Aymara : Ch´iyapa, "furrow" or "gap") is a Chilean town. Chiapa is a town located in the Tarapacá Region, Tamarugal Province, Huara Commune, Chile. It is located in the area of the Precordillera, about 3,200 meters above sea level. Its inhabitants are mainly Aymara descendants, with lineages that identify themselves as Quechua origin. However, according to the anthropological evidence existing to date, there were no Quechua-speaking communities at the time of the Spanish colonization in the Chiapa Valley or in the Quebrada de Aroma, without prejudice to the probable existence of multi-ethnic lineages.

Together with the towns of Illalla and Jaiña, they are part of the same cultural unit, based on the common irrigation system, being preserved from Pre-Hispanic times to the present. The town is within the Volcán Isluga National Park.

== History ==
The first settlements in the Chiapa Valley date back to the Pre-Hispanic times due to the gentile ruins on the hills and hills surrounding the town. It is believed that at the time of the Spanish conquest and colonization, Chiapa was under the jurisdiction of the chief Juan García Chuquichambi, who was possibly of Caranga origin. Chiapa was under the jurisdiction of the manor Caranga, whose capital was the highland village of Hatun Caranga, now known as Turco.

Chiapa was included within the encomienda de Tarapacá, granted to Lucas Martínez de Vegazo in 1540, where he brought together the dispersed population of the valley to reduce them into Indian towns, following the policies of Viceroy Toledo. During the Tupac Amaru II Rebellion between 1780 and 1783, Chiapa was in the hands of the rebels led by "the captain of the Sierra" Romualdo Pacivilca Callisaya, who established coordination with the rebels in Camiña and Tarapacá.

During the sovereignty of Peru, Chiapa belonged to the province and region of Tarapacá, being also the capital of the District of Chiapa. After the War of the Pacific, Chiapa became Chilean sovereignty, by virtue of the Treaty of Ancón celebrated in 1885. With the creation of the region of Tarapacá, Chiapa came under the jurisdiction of the Aroma District, of the Subdelegation of Camiña. During the time of nitrate exploitation, Chiapa was very important as a commercial center, arriving immigrants of various nationalities.

Within this context, Chiapa had to supply the Canton of Negreiros, through the town of Negreiros, becoming an important link in the existing trade network between the two ecological floors: the highlands and the coastal areas.
