= Chapiquilta =

Town in Tarapacá Region, Chile

Coordinates: 19°19′02″S 69°24′35″W

- Chapiquilta
- Coat of arms
- Country: Chile
- Region: Tarapacá Region
- Province: El Tamarugal

Chapiquilta is a Chilean town. It is located in Camiña in the Province of Tamarugal, Region of Tarapacá, Chile. It is located 197 km from the city of Iquique.
