= Arabilla =

Town in Chile

Coordinates: 19°13′11″S 68°51′54″W

- Town
- Arabilla
- Country: Chile
- Region: Tarapacá Region
- Province: El Tamarugal

Arabilla is a small Aymara hamlet. It is in the highlands of the Tarapacá Region (Chile), on the shores of the Arabilla lagoon and the Isluga river. It is located 26 km from Colchane and 1 km from Enquelga. Its inhabitants live from agriculture, livestock and handicrafts.
