= Moquella =

Town in Tarapacá Region of Chile

- Town
- Moquella
- Coordinates: 19°21′13″S 69°31′23″O
- Country: Chile
- Region: Tarapacá Region
- Province: El Tamarugal

Moquella is a Chilean town. It is a small town in the Tarapacá Region, Chile. Moquella administratively belongs to the commune of Camiña. It is located at the bottom of the Quebrada de Tana about 25 km west of Camiña. It is the second largest town in the commune. The town was also affected by the 2005 Tarapacá earthquake.
