= Eleuterio Ramírez =

Chilean colonel (1837–1879)

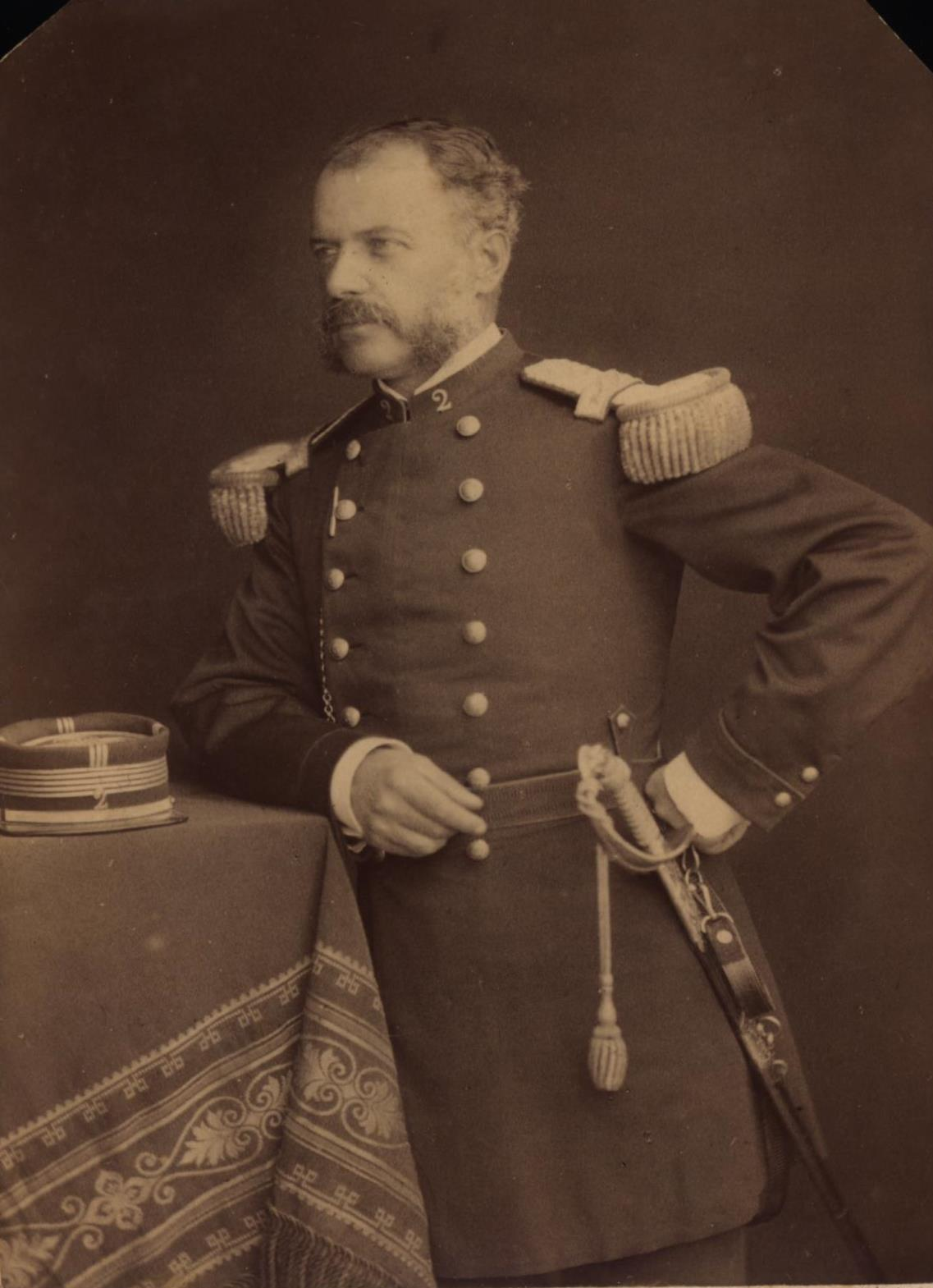
- Ramírez c. 1879
- Born: Eleuterio Ramírez Molina; 18 April 1837; Osorno, Chile
- Died: 27 November 1879 (aged 42); Tarapacá, Chilean Peru
- Burial place: Playa Ancha, Valparaíso
- Relatives: Herminia Arrate (granddaughter)
- Military career
- Allegiance: Chile
- Branch: Chilean Army
- Service years: 18??–1879
- Rank: Colonel
- Commands: 2nd Infantry Regiment "Maipes"
- Conflicts: War of the Pacific; Tarapacá campaign; Battle of Tarapacá †

Eleuterio Ramírez Molina (18 April 1837 – 27 November 1879) was a Chilean lieutenant colonel. He founded the Foro Militar military newspaper in 1871.

== Battle of Tarapacá ==
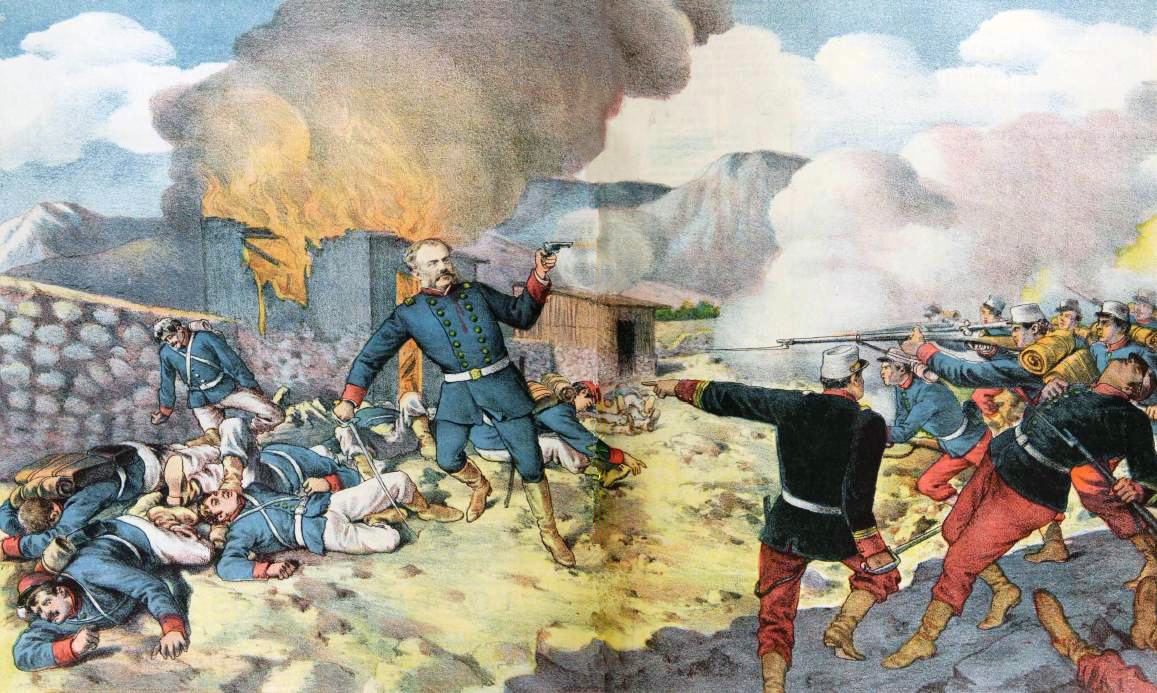
Depiction of his death in battle

During the War of the Pacific, Ramírez had obtained the rank of lieutenant colonel and commanded the 2nd Infantry Regiment "Maipo", who numbered 1,117, at the Battle of Tarapacá. In accordance to Ricardo Santa Cruz Vargas and Luis Arteaga's plan, he led a detachment of his regiment that numbered 880 to engage the forces of Col. Miguel Rios and Francisco Bolognesi in the Quebrada de Tarapacá. He doubted the plan, saying, "They are sending me into a slaughterhouse." Battle commenced when the Allies fired at the exposed Chileans from Tarapacá. Ramírez sent two companies to flank while he led an attack into the town. The street fight went into the main plaza and both sides took considerable losses. Due to his men's exhaustion, Ramírez ordered the entire force retreat to Guarasiña, near the entrance of the gorge. The force was half in number and used most of its ammunition. Santa Cruz's force also experience defeat, and once the battlefield was the calm, the Chileans fed their horses and searched for food and water. The Allies, reinforced by Justo Pastor Dávila and Alejandro Herrera arriving from Pachica, attacked. Some Chileans only had bayonets and entrenching tools for weapons. By 3:30 p.m., Ramírez was wounded twice and with only his revolver, mustered a third bayonet charge from his men. He was wounded again and died laying on the side of a house; by the time relief sent by Manuel Baquedano got there, 45% of Ramírez's line were casualties. His body was recovered months later. His death was glorified and a dramatized account by correspondent Eloy Caviedes, who got his information from testimonies, published in El Mercurio on 15 December claimed that in Ramírez's final moments he fired his revolver's last rounds. This process intended to create a narrative of brave Chilean devotion. In order to incentivize his soldiers to kill every enemy, prior to the commencement of the Battle of Tacna, Estanislao del Canto claimed Ramírez and his cantineras were burned alive by Peruvians.

== Tributes ==
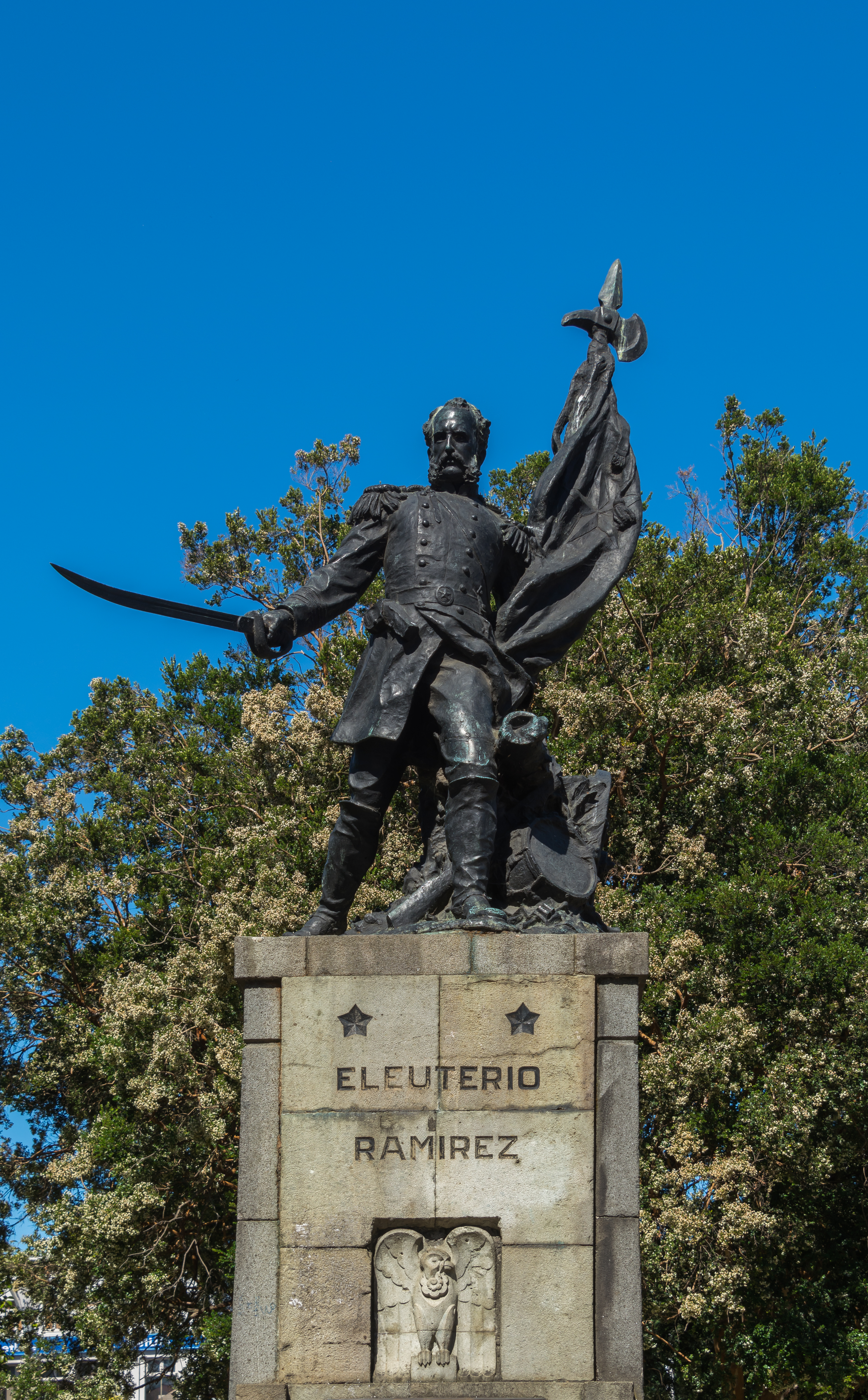
Monument in the Plaza de Armas de Osorno

A statue was opened in 1915 in Plaza Montt Varas, Santiago. His ashes lie within the "Infantry Regiment No. 2 Maipo" (former 2nd Line) located in Playa Ancha, Valparaíso. His crypt mausoleum was inaugurated in 1937 by President Arturo Alessandri Palma, and can be accessed by civilians.

== Family ==
Ramírez was the grandfather of the painter Herminia Arrate, who served as Provisional First Lady of Chile during 1932.

== Bibliography ==
- Cisternas Arellano, Hernán (19 June 2016). "Regimiento Maipo abrirá sus puertas para acceso". El Mercurio. ProQuest 1797782314.
- Fablet, Noémi (20 February 2023). "¿Invisibilización de la memoria de represión? El espacio urbano en disputa tras la matanza de Santa María de Iquique (1907–1957)". Nuevo Mundo Mundos Nuevos. OpenEdition. doi:10.4000/nuevomundo.91106. S2CID 257291129.
- Ibarra-Cifuentes, Patricio (16 January 2020). "Los corresponsales de guerra chilenos en la Guerra del Pacífico (1879–1883)". Estudios sobre el Mensaje Periodístico. 26 (1). Gale: 147–155. doi:10.5209/esmp.67294. S2CID 212947817.
- Sater, William F. (2007). Andean tragedy: fighting the war of the Pacific, 1879–1884. Lincoln: University of Nebraska Press. ISBN 978-0-8032-0759-2 – via Project MUSE.
