= Berenguelaj =

Town in the Tarapacá Region, Chile

Berenguela
- Town
- Country: Chile
- Region: Tarapacá Region
- Province: El Tamarugal

Berenguela is a highland Aymara town. It is located in the commune of Colchane, Tarapacá Region, Chile.
