= Feast of Saint Lawrence =

Liturgical commemorations of the Patron Saint of Peasants

Feast of Saint Lawrence the Deacon
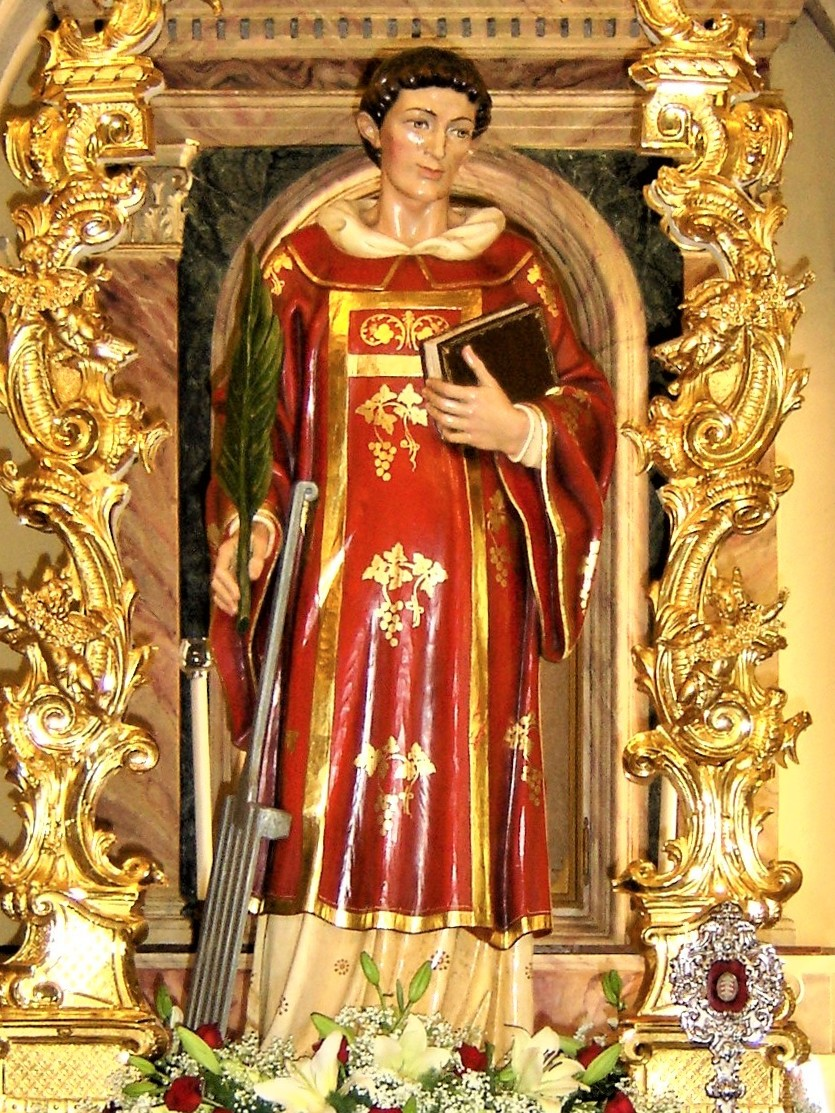
- Statue of Saint Lawrence decorated along with the venerable relic on his patronal feastday in the church of Sola, (BG) Italy.
- Official name: Fiestas de San Lorenzo
- Observed by: 1) People: those who work with open fires (cooks, bakers, brewers, textile cleaners, tanners), those to whom fire means harm (librarians, archivists, miners, poor people), and comedians 2) Localities: Rome and Grosseto (Italy), Rotterdam (Netherlands), Huesca (Spain), San Lawrenz, Gozo, and Birgu (Malta), Barangay San Lorenzo, San Pablo, Laguna, Balagtas, Bulacan, Balangiga, Eastern Samar, and Mexico, Pampanga (Philippines), Canada, Colombo City (Sri Lanka)
- Type: Christian
- Celebrations: Processions, Masses, star-gazing
- Date: August 10
- Related to: Saint Lawrence

The Feast of Saint Lawrence or Feast of Saint Lawrence, Deacon is a significant liturgical celebration in the Roman Catholic Church, commemorating the martyrdom of Saint Lawrence, one of the seven deacons of Rome, on August 10. Observed annually, the feast honors Lawrence's enduring legacy as a martyr and patron saint of Rome, alongside Saints Peter and Paul. The feast is part of a two-week cycle of liturgical observances that include related commemorations, such as the Finding of Saint Stephen and the feast of Saint Sixtus II.

== History ==
Saint Lawrence, martyred in 258 AD during the persecution under Emperor Valerian, is celebrated for his role as a deacon responsible for the Church's charitable activities and his martyrdom by being roasted alive on a gridiron. His feast has been one of the most important in the Roman ecclesiastical calendar since early Christian times, reflecting his status as a patron saint of Rome. Numerous churches in Rome are dedicated to him, including the Patriarchal Basilica of Saint Lawrence outside-the-Walls, where he is buried, and historic parishes such as San Lorenzo in Panisperna (the reputed site of his martyrdom), San Lorenzo in Lucina, and San Lorenzo in Damaso. These churches are often included in the Roman station church cycle from Septuagesima to Low Sunday, underscoring their liturgical importance. The feast is closely associated with Saint Stephen, the first Christian martyr, due to parallels in their lives as deacons and their gruesome martyrdoms—Stephen by stoning and Lawrence by roasting. This connection is reflected in both liturgy and art, notably in the Niccoline Chapel at the Vatican, where Fra Angelico’s frescoes depict the martyrdoms of both saints, and in the Sancta Sanctorum, which houses relics of Lawrence, including a piece of the gridiron used in his martyrdom.

The feast’s prominence and antiquity is evidenced by its inclusion in the traditional canon of the Mass, where Lawrence is named first among non-bishops, following Sixtus II, Cornelius, and Cyprian. His liturgical celebration on 10 August has the rank of feast in the General Roman Calendar, consistent with the oldest Christian calendars, e.g. the Almanac of Philocalus for the year 354, the inventory of which contains the principal feasts of the Roman martyrs of the middle of the fourth century. The feast became of benchmark on the calendar of Christian nations, and various historical events took place on that day.

On August 10, 1535, French explorer Jacques Cartier gave the name of Fleuve Saint-Laurent to the great river he began to sail up as he explored this new territory.

On 10 August 1557, the extremely pious Philip II attributed his victory at the Battle of St. Quentin to the intercession of Saint Lawrence. In his honorm the Spanish Emperor ordered that a great palace in the shape of a gridiron, remembering the martyrdom of Saint Lawrence, be built in the Guadarrama Mountains northwest of Madrid. Known as El Escorial, it was finally completed in 1584.

In his journal Les Révolutions de Paris, Louis-Marie Prudhomme coined the expression of the "Saint-Laurent Massacre" to refer to August 10, 1792, a defining event of the French Revolution, when armed revolutionaries in Paris, increasingly in conflict with the French monarchy, stormed the Tuileries Palace.

== Observance ==
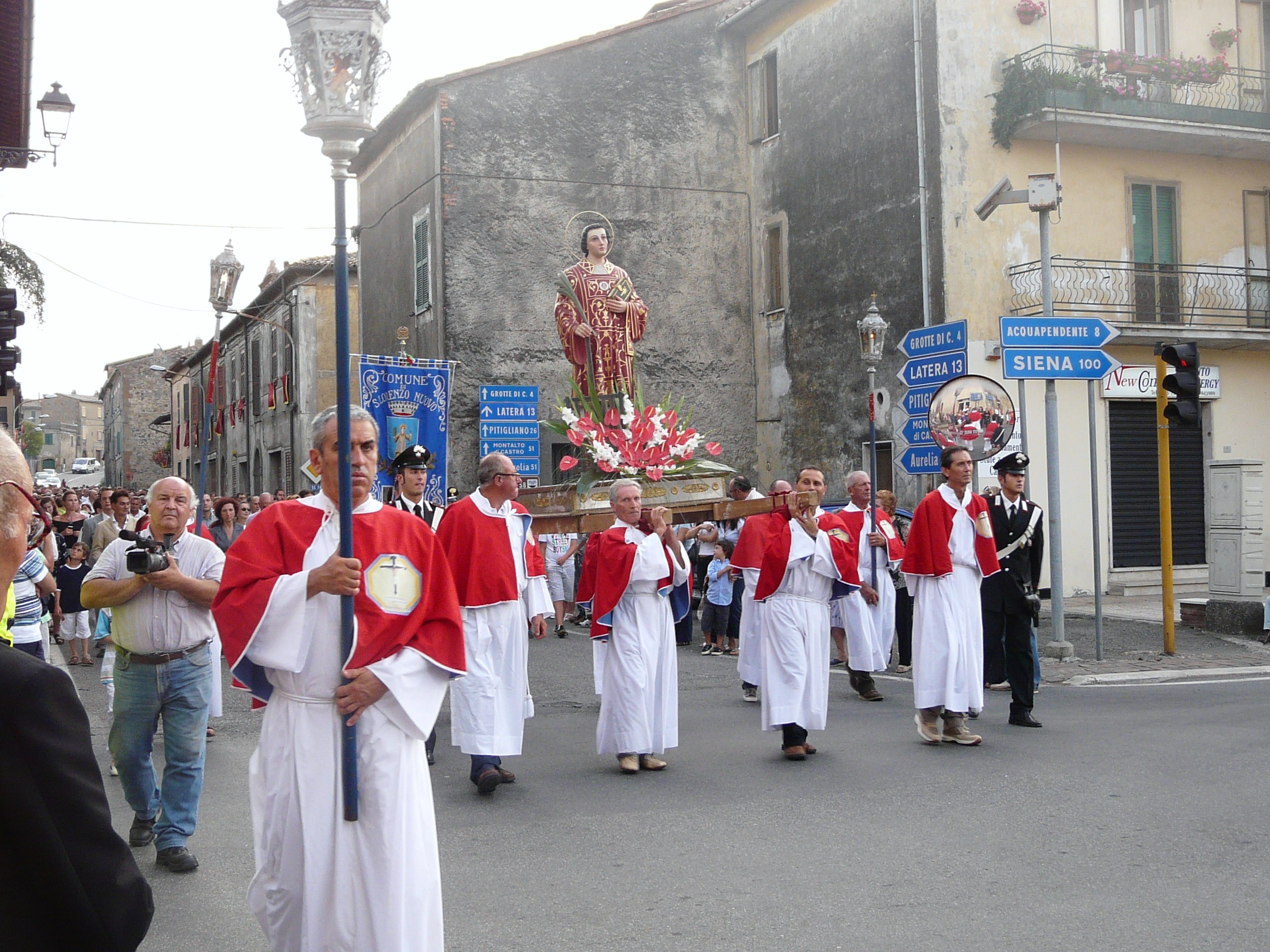
Procession of the Statue of San Lorenzo in Italy for the patronal feast on August 10.

=== Liturgical cycle ===
The Feast of Saint Lawrence is part of a broader liturgical cycle beginning on August 3 with the Finding of Saint Stephen, a feast observed universally in the Roman Rite until 1960. This is followed by the feast of Saint Sixtus II on August 6, commemorating the martyrdom of the pope and six of Rome's seven deacons, including Lawrence, under Valerian's persecution. The vigil of Saint Lawrence on August 9, historically also the feast of Saint Romanus (a soldier converted by Lawrence and martyred the day before him), was reduced to a commemoration in the Tridentine reform. The Byzantine tradition combines the commemorations of Sixtus, his deacons, and Romanus with Lawrence's feast on August 10.

=== Liturgical propers ===
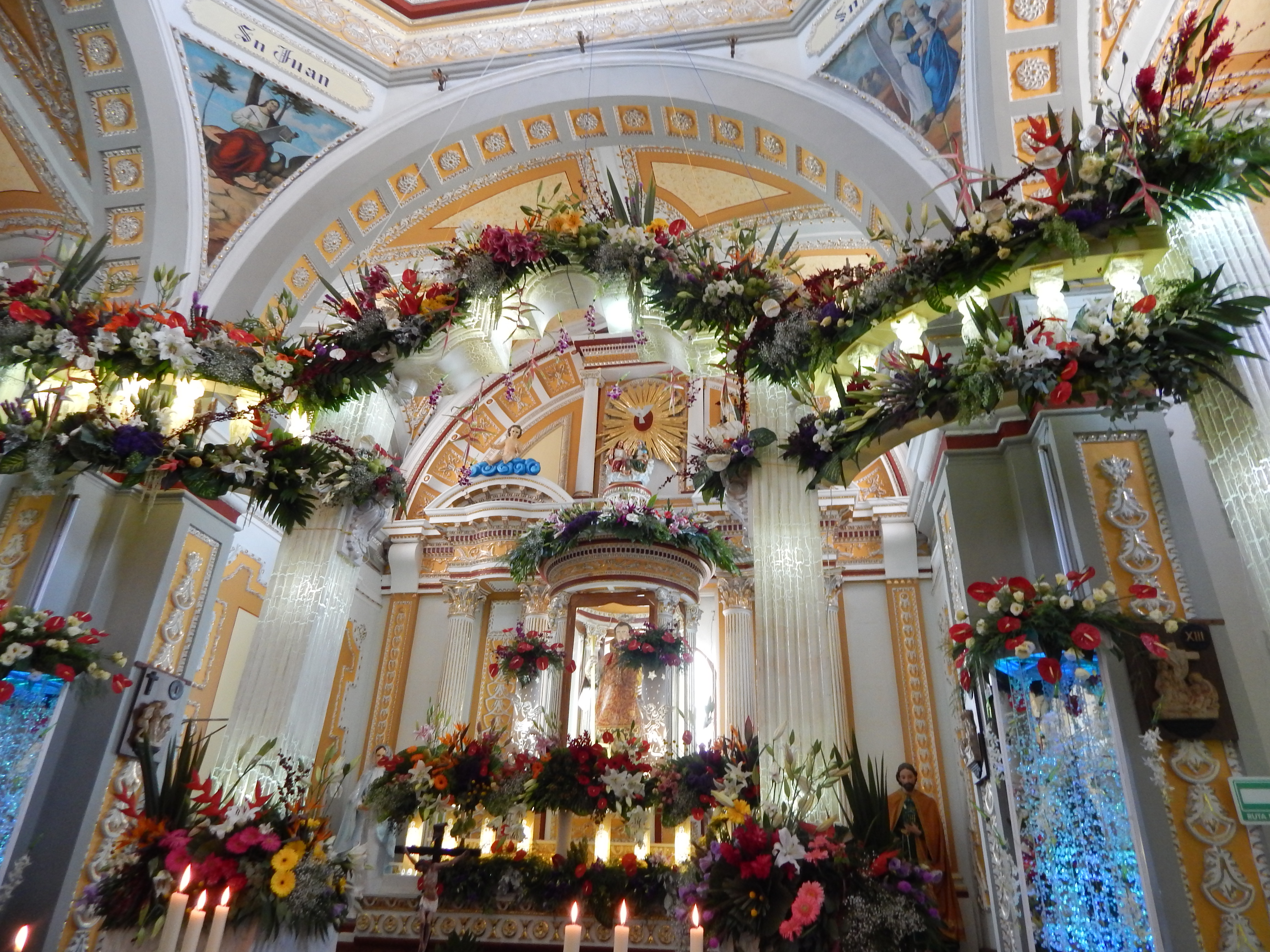
This photo highlights the decoration of the church and the great importance that the people of Chiautzingo give to the feast of their patron saint, Saint Lawrence, which is celebrated every August 10th.

The liturgy of the feast includes specific antiphons that highlight Lawrence's martyrdom. For example, the third antiphon of Lauds, adapted from Psalm 62, reads: “Adhaesit anima mea post te, quia caro mea igne cremata est pro te, Deus meus” (“My soul hath stuck close to Thee, because my flesh was burnt for Thy sake, my God”), paralleling a similar antiphon for Saint Stephen. The Roman Breviary of 1529 recounts Lawrence's defiance of the Emperor, stating, “I offer myself as a sacrifice to God, unto the odor of sweetness, for a contrite spirit is a sacrifice to God.”

== Customs ==
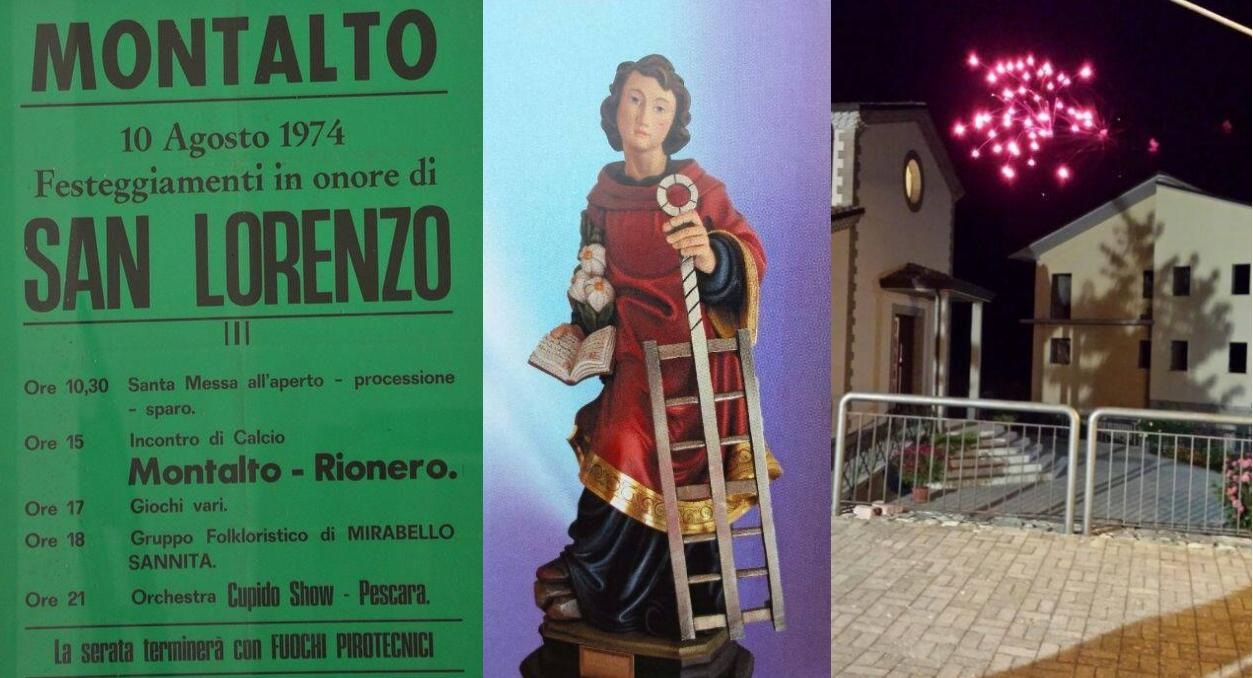
Flyer for the feast of San Lorenzo in Italy in 1974.

=== Tears of Saint Lawrence ===
The Tears of Saint Lawrence is the popular name for the Perseid meteor shower, an annual astronomical event occurring from mid-July to late August, with its peak typically around August 10–12, coinciding closely with the Feast of Saint Lawrence on August 10. This meteor shower, caused by debris from the comet Swift-Tuttle entering Earth's atmosphere at high speeds, creates bright streaks of light that appear to radiate from the constellation Perseus, hence the name "Perseids." The association with Saint Lawrence, a 3rd-century Roman deacon martyred by being roasted alive on a gridiron in 258 AD, stems from the timing of the shower and the imagery of fiery "tears" falling from the sky, evoking the saint's martyrdom. Catholic tradition, particularly in parts of England, Germany, and Italy, linked these meteors to Lawrence's suffering, with some lore suggesting the streaks represent the coals of his martyrdom or his tears of faith.

=== Festival de San Lorenzo (Chile) ===
The Festival of San Lorenzo is an annual religious celebration held in San Lorenzo de Tarapacá, a small town in the Huara commune of the Tarapacá Region, Chile and taking place primarily on August 9–10. Known as “el Lolo” locally, the festival attracts thousands of devotees from Chile, Bolivia, Peru, and Argentina, featuring vibrant religious dances, processions, and Masses. With origins tracing back to the Spanish colonial period in the 16th or 17th century, the event blends Catholic traditions with Andean and mestizo cultural elements, making it one of northern Chile's most significant religious festivities. In 2023, approximately 150,000 people attended, highlighting its regional importance.

=== La 'nzegna di Napoli (Italy) ===
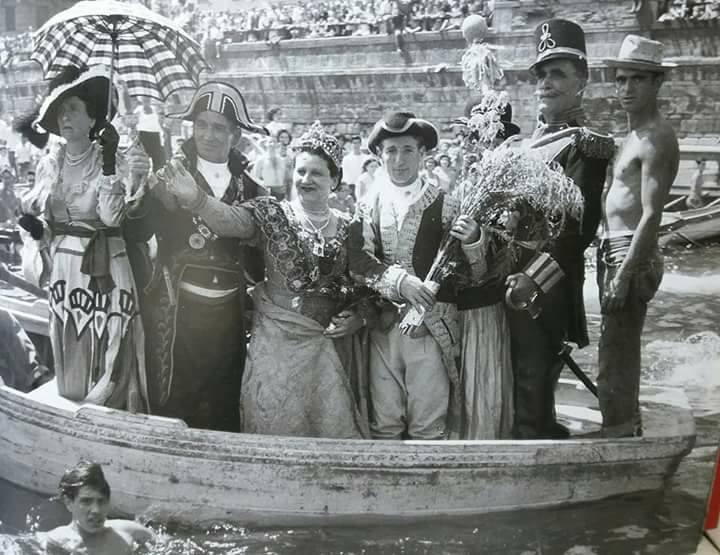
Naples, Santa Lucia. Traditional 'Nzegna festival in its last edition in 1953.

The "'nzegna" was the festival celebrated in Naples on the feast of San Lorenzo, from the early 19th century until 1953 in the Santa Lucia area. From the church of Santa Maria della Catena, at noon on August 10, a procession of "Luciani" in Bourbon costume set out, following a carriage carrying an elderly couple dressed as Ferdinand IV and Maria Carolina. The royals preceded a crowd of commoners dressed as dignitaries who, upon reaching the sea, were thrown into the water, as in an ancestral ritual. Hence, 'nzegna, meaning teaching, instruction in the sea and the twists of fate.

== See also ==
- Saint Lawrence
- Saint Stephen
- Saint Sixtus II
- Roman Rite
- Liturgical Calendar
