= Mamin =

Mamin may refer to

- Mamin (name)
- Mamin River in Saint Lucia
- Anse Mamin, a small black sand beach in Saint Lucia

== See also ==
- Mamiña, a village in northern Chile
