= Pachica, Chile =

Town in Tarapacá region, Chile

Pachica
- Town
- Pachica
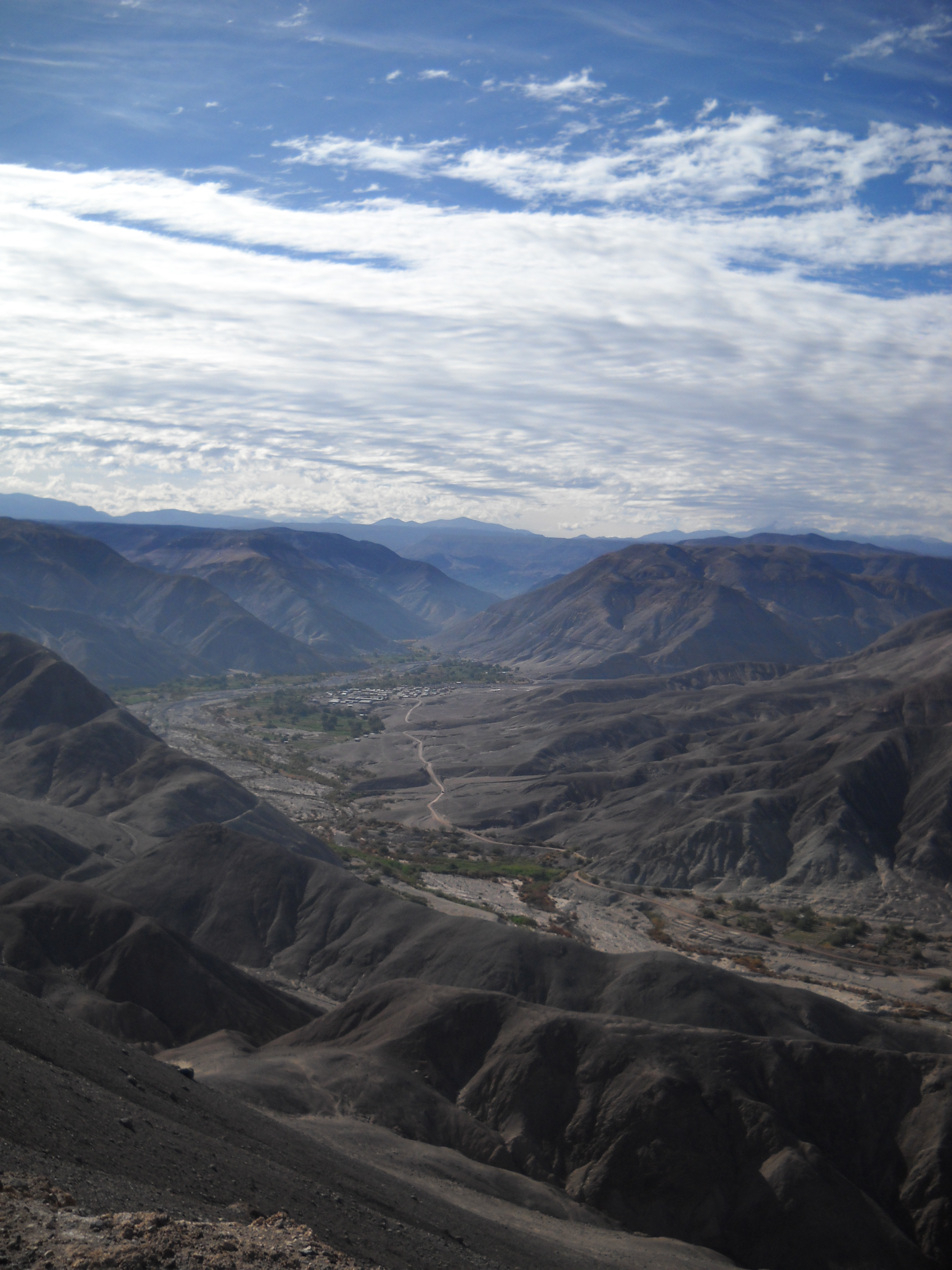
- Interactive map of Pachica
- Coordinates: 19°51′57″S 69°25′54″W
- Country: Chile
- Region: Tarapacá Region
- Province: El Tamarugal

Pachica is a Chilean town. It is a town in the Chilean highlands located in the commune of Huara, in the Tarapacá region.

== Etymology ==
The toponym "Pachica" is of Aymara origin. It is derived from the words paya, pä - (two, pair) and chika - (half), so it is translated as "two halves".

== History ==
Pachica is a small town located in the Tarapacá ravine that dates back to the 18th century and originally was part of Peru. The town also has several tourist attractions like Infiernillo where you can find petroglyphs and a construction of Tranque Pachica that was abandoned in the 1930s whose objective was to supply water to the towns of the Quebrada de Tarapacá. The residents of Pachica are involved in agriculture, mostly the production of alfalfa and vegetables. Their houses built since the 80's are made of stone and woven cane.

== Demography ==
The town has 1,409 people according to the 2019 census.
