= Mamina =

Mamina may refer to:

- Feminine form of the Slavic surname Mamin
- Mamiña, village in Chile
- Mamina Koné, Ivorian taekwondo athlete
