= Quebe, Chile =

Town in Tarapacá Region of Chile

Coordinates: 19°27′27″S 68°48′59″W

Quebe
- Town
- Quebe
- Country: Chile
- Region: Tarapacá Region
- Province: Colchane

Quebe is a Chilean town. It is a highland Aymara town. It is located in the commune of Colchane, Tarapacá Region, Chile. It is located 4004 meters above sea level.
