= Mocha, Chile =

Town in Chile

Mocha
- Town
- Mocha
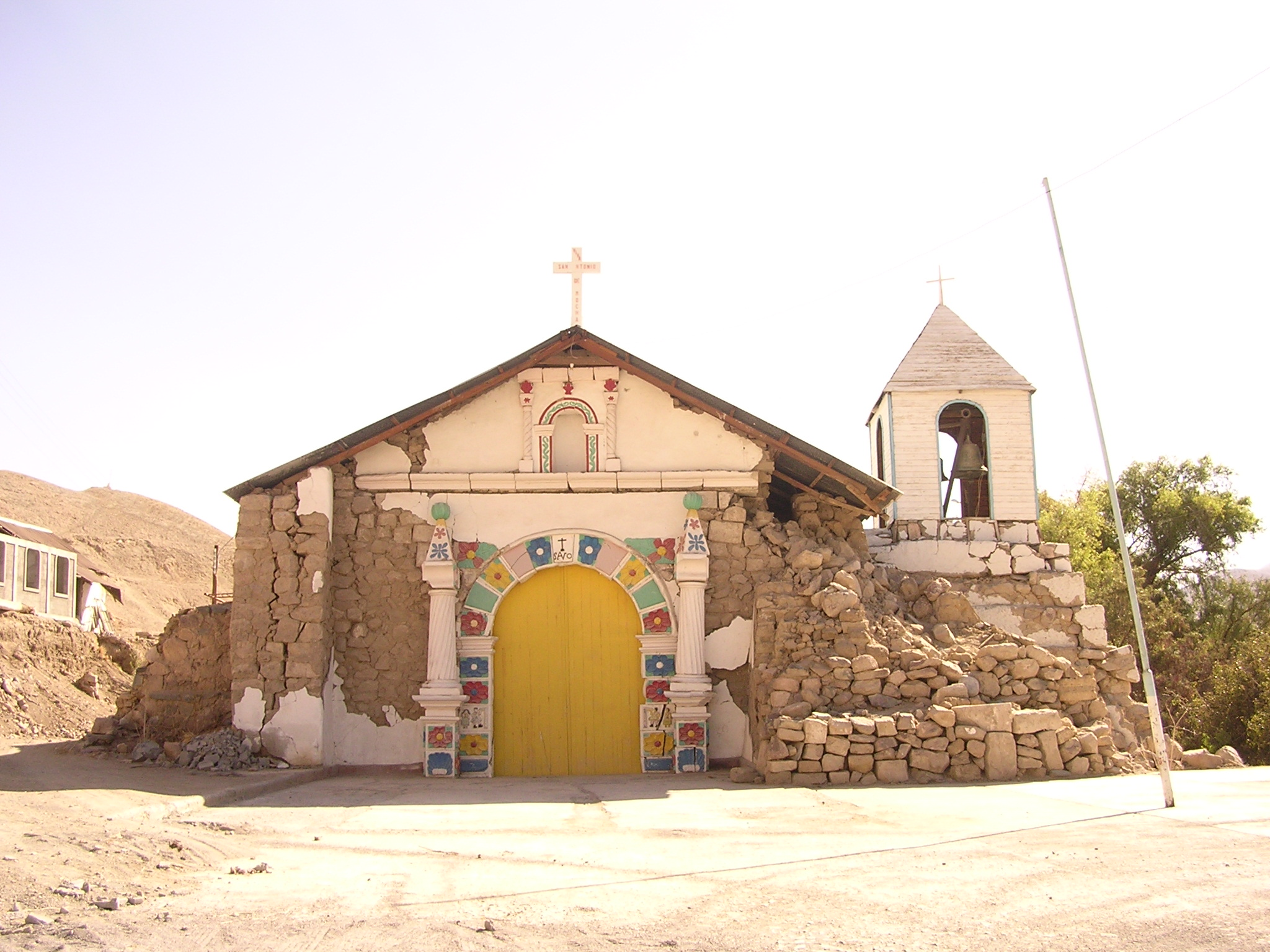

- Coat of arms

- Coordinates: 19°48′44″S 69°16′30″W
- Country: Chile
- Region: Tarapacá Region
- Province: Tamarugal

Mocha is a Chilean town. It is located approximately 70km northeast of Huara, in the Tarapacá Region, Chile. The town is situated in commune of Huara. Mocha is a livestock and crop dependent town, where it depends on the Quebrada de Tarapacá River.
