= Sibaya =

- Hamlet
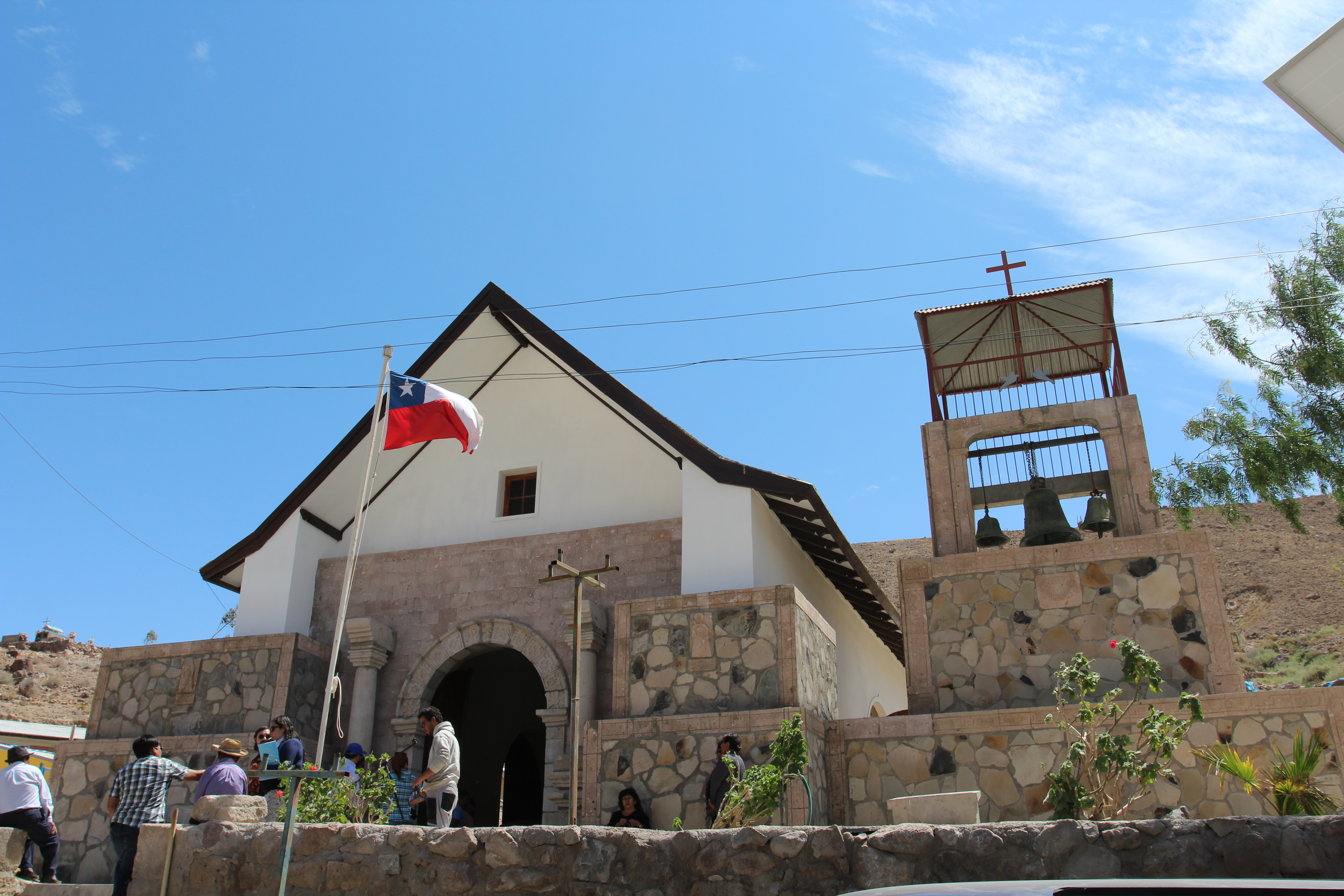
- Church of Sibaya

- Map of the commune of Huara in Tarapacá Region Location in Chile
- Coordinates: 19°46′58″S 69°10′22″W
- Country: Chile
- Region: Tarapacá
- Province: Tamarugal
- Commune: Huara

Government
  - Type: Municipal council
- Elevation: 2,840 m (9,320 ft)

Population (2017 Census)
  - Total: 46

Sex
  - Men: 24
  - Women: 22
- Time zone: UTC-4 (CLT)
  - Summer (DST): UTC-3 (CLST)
- Area code: (+56) 5

Sibaya is a hamlet in the Altiplano of northern Chile, in Tamarugal Province. As of 2017 Sibaya had 46 inhabitants and 123 homes. It has an irrigation system based on underground aqueducts tapping an aquifer.

The hamlet was badly hit by the 2005 Tarapacá earthquake. The Church of Sibaya is listed as a National Monument within the category of Historical Monument since January 27, 2009. After its reconstruction the church was reopened on September 5, 2015.
