= Javier García Choque =

Chilean politician

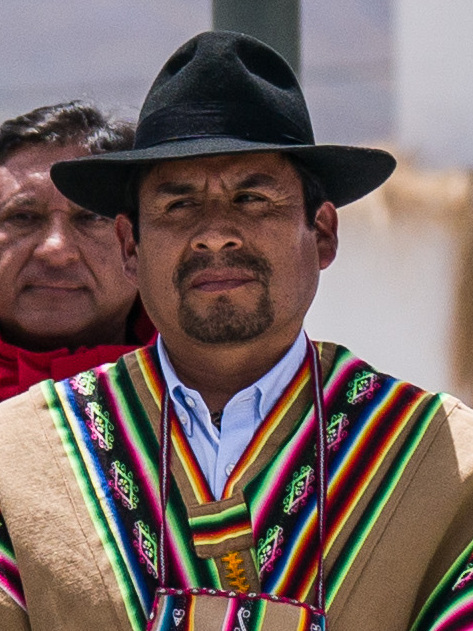

Mayor of Colchane
- Incumbent
- Assumed office 6 December 2016
- Preceded by: Teófilo Mamani

Personal details
- Born: 29 August 1975 (age 51) Camiña, Chile
- Party: Amplitude (2014−2018); National Renewal
- Children: Three
- Parent(s): Andrés García Vilches; María Choque Mamani
- Education: Arturo Prat University (no degree); Bolivarian University of Chile (no degree); Academy of Christian Humanism University (LLB)
- Occupation: Politician
- Profession: Lawyer

Javier Ignacio García Choque (born August 29, 1975) is a Chilean politician who serves as mayor of Colchane.

Close to right-wing politics, since 2020, García Choque gained attention with the Venezuelan migrant crisis in Northern Chile, as well as for his criticism towards centre-right government of Sebastián Piñera (2018−2022).

== Early life and studies ==
García Choque was born in Camiña, but he was raised in Colchane, a 300-inhabitants village on the Chilean border with Bolivia. His father, Andrés García, was a farmer and president of the neighborhood council. Similarly, his great-grandfather, Melchor García, came from southern Peru to look for work and married with a Chilean.

When he attended the primary school in Colchane, his classmates spoke Aymara, a language he would master as an adult. Then, García attended high school both in Iquique and Arica at the following establishments: the Commercial Institute Baldomero Wolnitzky and the Politechnical Lyceum of Arica. According to him, in those cities, he suffered discrimination from his classmates due to his ethnic appearance.

'They said me indigenous, bolivian, negro'.
Javier García Choque to Ex-Ante.
10 October 2021.

In 1994, García Choque graduated from High School. Then, he joined the Arturo Prat University to study a Bachelor of Laws, which he continued in the Bolivarian University of Chile. Nevertheless, due to the lack of accreditation of this last one, he validated his subjects in the Academy of Christian Humanism University (UAHC), and –finally– he received as lawyer in the early 2000s. About it, different media has recognized him as an outstanding student in the UAHC, as well as he paid his studies with the help of his family and his own work as an events organizer for an architects study in Santiago, the capital city of Chile.

== Political career ==
In 2016 and 2021, he was elected mayor of Colchane, his hometown. He initially was in the party National Renewal, then Amplitude and in 2021 he ran as independent with the coalition of the Progressive Party and the Christian Democratic Party.
