= Quebrada de Tarapacá =

- Town
- Quebrada de Tarapacá
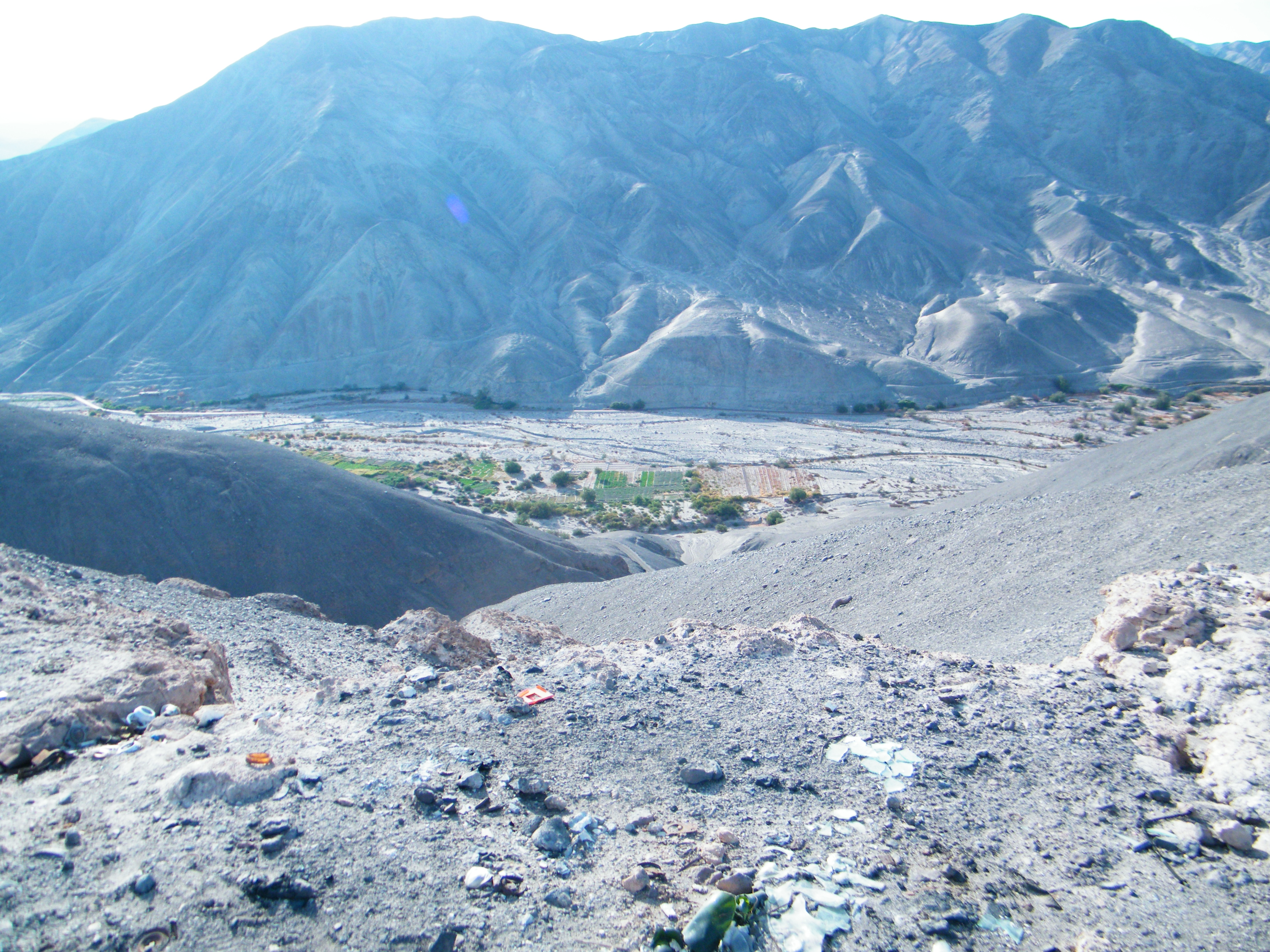

- Coat of arms

- Location within Chile
- Coordinates: 19.76767°S 68.97872°W
- Country: Chile
- Region: Tarapacá Region
- Province: El Tamarugal

Quebrada de Tarapacá is the most important water source in the Pampa del Tamarugal. The river originates from the high Andes Mountains and its waters add up and evaporate in the desert.

== Location ==
At its source the streams of Castillume and Colchane flow to the south, while to the north the river flows to Sallire. Downstream, a kilometer before reaching Colchane, it is joined to the north by the Aroma stream that contributes 120 L/s and the Cotacahue stream that brings 100 L/s to the south to complete the beginning of the Tarapacá ravine. Two kilometers upstream from Sibaya it is joined by the Siyajualla (or Jellajella) ravine to the south, which usually does not bring water but provides an important flow in times of flood. In Sibaya the stream is narrow.
