= Huayra furnace =

Historical type of artisan furnace in South America

A huayra furnace or huayrachinas (meaning "place through which wind blows" in Imperial Quechua) is an Andean artisan furnace of Prehispanic design. Huayras were wind-driven and used to smelt copper. The furnance has the shape of a small turret with opening for wind to enter and drive the combustion. Molten metal collects at the bottom together with slag and for most purposes once separated from the slag it needs further processing to remove impurities.

In Bolivia they were in use at least until the late 19th century and were known form colonial-era description of 1640. Museo Nacional de La Paz in Bolivia host a reconstruction of a huayra. The Atacama Desert's Tarapacá valley alone had 26 archaeological huayra sites identified by 2013.
