= Pozo Almonte =

- City and Commune
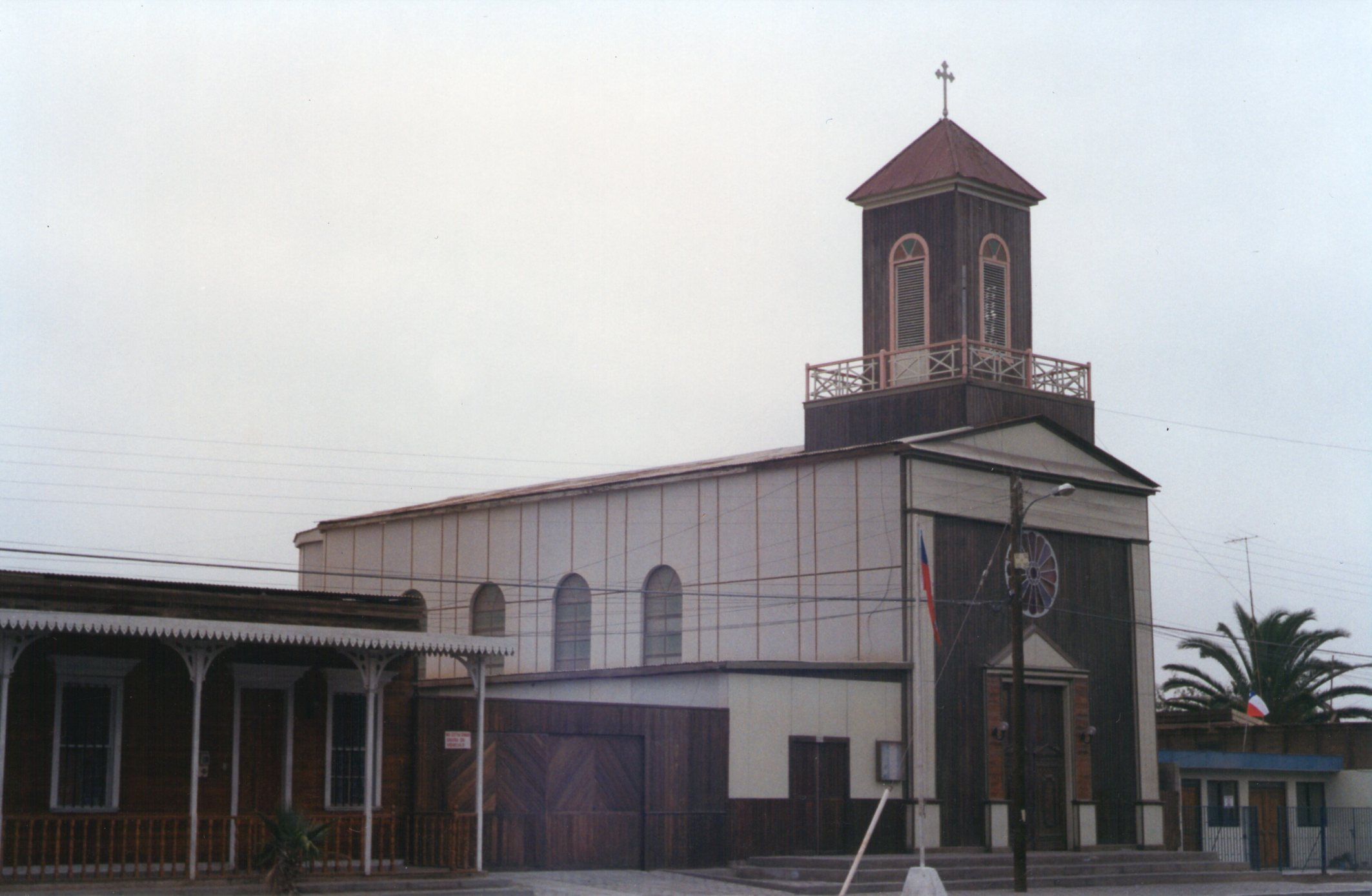
- Church of Pozo Almonte

- Coat of arms Map of Pozo Almonte in Tarapacá Region Location in Chile
- Coordinates (city): 20°16′S 69°48′W
- Country: Chile
- Region: Tarapacá
- Province: Tamarugal
- Founded: 1875

Government
  - Type: Municipal council

Area
  - Total: 13,765.8 km^{2} (5,315.0 sq mi)
- Elevation: 1,072 m (3,517 ft)

Population (2017 Census)
  - Total: 15,711
  - Density: 1.1413/km^{2} (2.9560/sq mi)
  - Urban: 8,987
  - Rural: 6,724
- Demonym: Pocino

Sex
  - Men: 6,521
  - Women: 4,309
- Time zone: UTC−4 (CLT)
  - Summer (DST): UTC−3 (CLST)
- Climate: BWk
- Website: Official website (in Spanish)

Pozo Almonte (Spanish pronunciation: [ˈposo alˈmonte]) is a city and commune of Chile located in the interior of Atacama Desert. It has been the capital of Tamarugal Province since this province was established in 2007. The city is located at 52 km (32 mi) from Tarapacá Region's capital, Iquique. It has over 15,000 inhabitants. The commune has an area of 13,766 km (8,554 mi) and borders the following communes: Iquique, Alto Hospicio, Huara, Pica, María Elena and Tocopilla (the last two being in Tocopilla Province).

Mining company Cosayach extracts iodine and nitrate in the commune and processes it in the village of Cala-Cala.

== Demographics ==
According to the 2017 census of the National Statistics Institute, Pozo Almonte had 15,711 inhabitants (8,987 men and 6,724 women). The population grew by 45% (4,881 persons) between the 2002 and 2017 censuses.

== Administration ==
As a commune, Pozo Almonte is a third-level administrative division of Chile administered by a municipal council, headed by an alcalde who is directly elected every four years.

Within the electoral divisions of Chile, Pozo Almonte is represented in the Chamber of Deputies by Marta Isasi (Ind.) and Hugo Gutiérrez (PC) as part of the 2nd electoral district, which includes the entire Tarapacá Region. The commune is represented in the Senate by José Miguel Insulza (PS, 2018–2026) and José Durana (UDI, 2018–2026) as part of the 1st senatorial constituency (Arica and Parinacota Region and Tarapacá Region).

== Climate ==
Climate data for Canchones, elevation 960 m (3,150 ft)
Month	Jan	Feb	Mar	Apr	May	Jun	Jul	Aug	Sep	Oct	Nov	Dec	Year
Mean daily maximum °C (°F)	31.8 (89.2)	32.2 (90.0)	32.0 (89.6)	31.1 (88.0)	29.9 (85.8)	28.3 (82.9)	29.0 (84.2)	30.1 (86.2)	31.3 (88.3)	31.3 (88.3)	31.8 (89.2)	31.9 (89.4)	30.9 (87.6)
Daily mean °C (°F)	21.0 (69.8)	21.0 (69.8)	19.3 (66.7)	17.0 (62.6)	14.4 (57.9)	12.9 (55.2)	12.8 (55.0)	13.4 (56.1)	15.7 (60.3)	16.4 (61.5)	17.6 (63.7)	19.2 (66.6)	16.7 (62.1)
Mean daily minimum °C (°F)	11.5 (52.7)	11.3 (52.3)	8.2 (46.8)	5.4 (41.7)	2.0 (35.6)	0.0 (32.0)	−0.2 (31.6)	−0.5 (31.1)	2.3 (36.1)	3.2 (37.8)	4.5 (40.1)	7.0 (44.6)	4.6 (40.2)
Average precipitation mm (inches)	0.3 (0.01)	0.3 (0.01)	0.0 (0.0)	0.0 (0.0)	0.0 (0.0)	0.0 (0.0)	0.1 (0.00)	0.0 (0.0)	0.0 (0.0)	0.0 (0.0)	0.0 (0.0)	0.0 (0.0)	0.7 (0.02)
Average relative humidity (%)	57	57	58	55	54	55	51	48	46	46	47	50	52
Source: Bioclimatografia de Chile

Climate data for Colonia Pintados, elevation 977 m (3,205 ft)
Month	Jan	Feb	Mar	Apr	May	Jun	Jul	Aug	Sep	Oct	Nov	Dec	Year
Mean daily maximum °C (°F)	29.7 (85.5)	30.3 (86.5)	29.8 (85.6)	29.2 (84.6)	27.7 (81.9)	26.6 (79.9)	26.2 (79.2)	28.7 (83.7)	29.3 (84.7)	28.1 (82.6)	29.8 (85.6)	29.5 (85.1)	28.7 (83.7)
Daily mean °C (°F)	19.8 (67.6)	20.1 (68.2)	18.1 (64.6)	17.2 (63.0)	15.0 (59.0)	13.6 (56.5)	13.6 (56.5)	14.1 (57.4)	15.7 (60.3)	16.5 (61.7)	17.4 (63.3)	18.5 (65.3)	16.6 (61.9)
Mean daily minimum °C (°F)	11.1 (52.0)	11.8 (53.2)	9.7 (49.5)	6.9 (44.4)	3.9 (39.0)	2.1 (35.8)	1.8 (35.2)	1.8 (35.2)	4.0 (39.2)	4.6 (40.3)	5.4 (41.7)	8.2 (46.8)	5.9 (42.7)
Average precipitation mm (inches)	0.0 (0.0)	0.1 (0.00)	0.0 (0.0)	0.0 (0.0)	0.0 (0.0)	0.1 (0.00)	0.0 (0.0)	0.1 (0.00)	0.0 (0.0)	0.0 (0.0)	0.0 (0.0)	0.0 (0.0)	0.3 (0)
Average relative humidity (%)	60	61	60	60	61	56	52	59	59	58	55	61	59
Source: Bioclimatografia de Chile

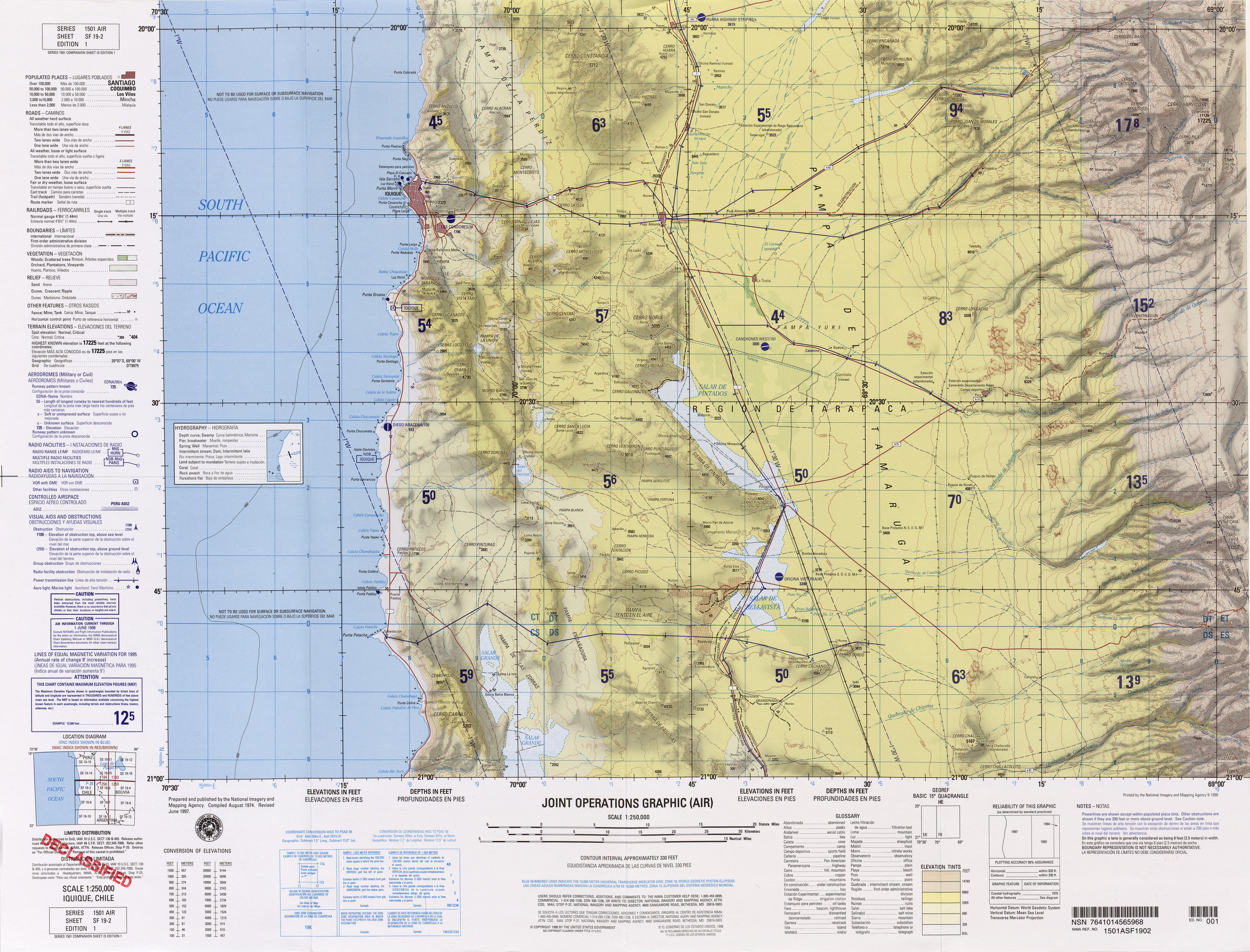
Map of the Pozo Almonte region, east of Iquique
