= Festival of San Lorenzo =

Annual religious holiday in Tarapacá, Chile

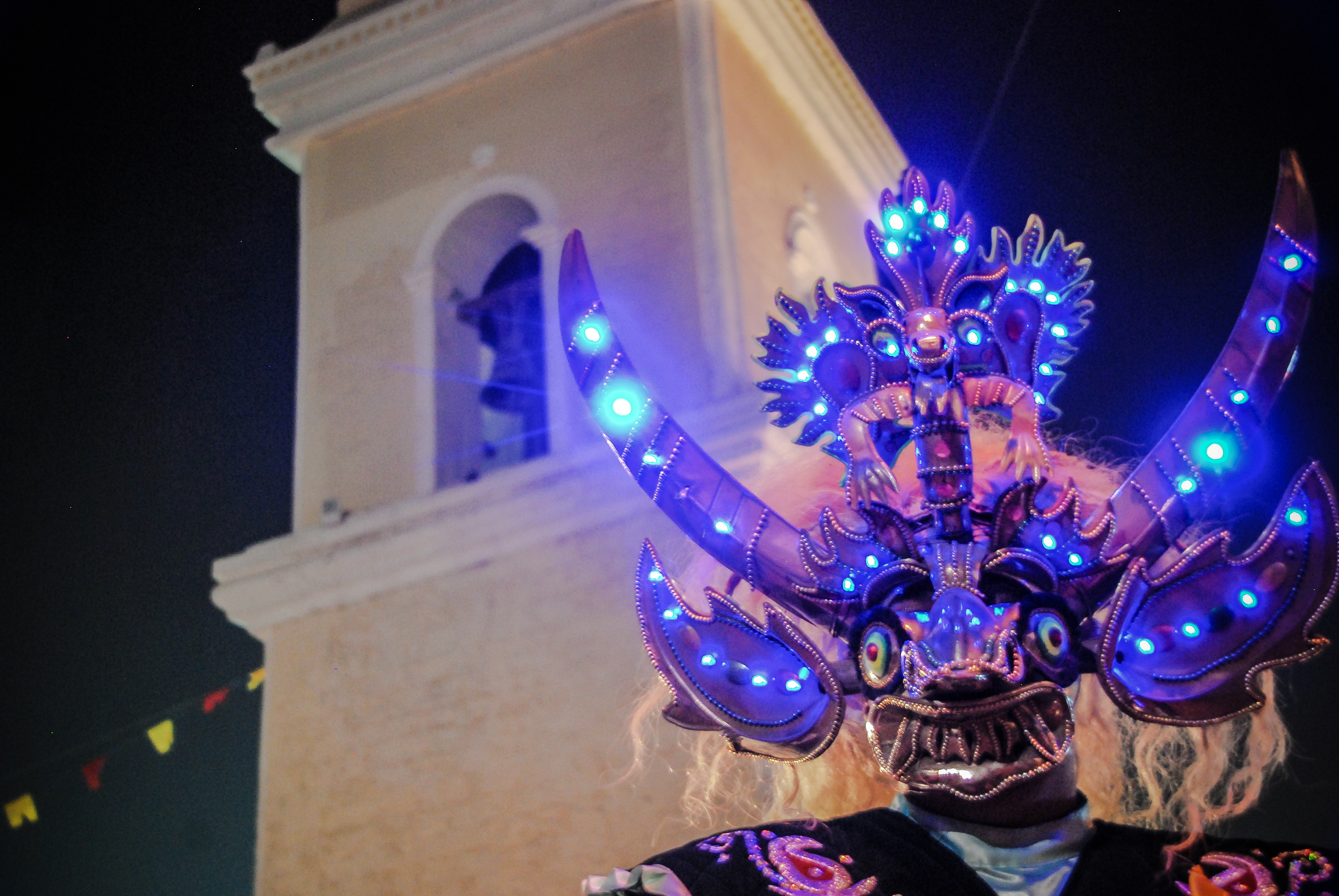
Pueblo de Tarapacá y su iglesia, durante la festividad de San Lorenzo.

The festival of San Lorenzo is a religious holiday occurring every year in Tarapacá, Chile. The festival celebrates Saint Lawrence, a deacon from Spain, who was martyred during the Romans' persecution of the Catholic Church in 258 during the rule of Valerian. Saint Lawrence is the patron saint of Tarapacá. "[I]t is San Lorenzo himself who invites people to meet his friend Jesus Christ."

== Background ==
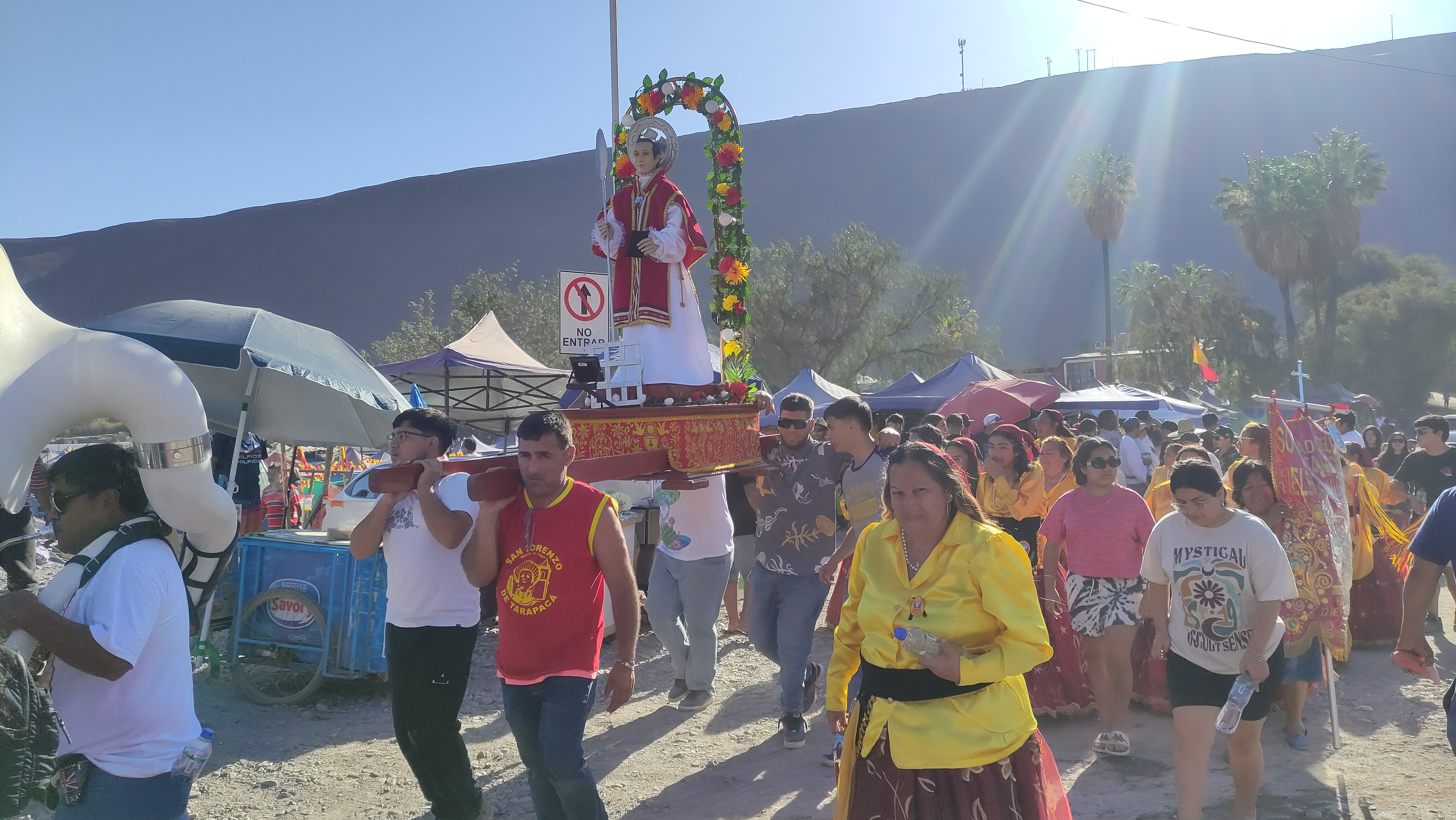
San Lorenzo de Tarapacá

The celebration begins on August 6 each year, when hundreds of religious dancers arrive in the city, from nearby places such as Iquique, Calama, Arica, Alto Hospicio, and Tocopilla. Recently, attendees from Antofagasta began attending and sleeping in tents throughout the city during the festival. One of the largest attractions of the festival is the extravagant dances which are performed by different Catholic dance troupes during the festival. These dances are performed to honor Saint Lawrence or to demonstrate their faith.

In 2005, the festival did not occur as normal. This is due to severe damages from the earthquake which occurred earlier that year. Despite these damages, the temple of San Lorenzo was rebuilt. In 2011, it is estimated that 70,000 people attended. In 2013, a large number of cases of influenza led to infection control methods being implemented at the festival. The festival was cancelled by Guillermo Vera, bishop of the diocese of Iquique, in 2020 due to the COVID-19 pandemic in Chile.

There is a second, smaller festival, the feast of "La Reliquia", held on the last Sunday of April of each year, to celebrate the town obtaining a relic of Saint Lawrence in 1995.
