= Caranga =

1 of 8 parishes in Proaza

Coordinates: 43.216667°N 6.033333°W

Caranga is one of eight parishes in Proaza, a municipality within the province and autonomous community of Asturias, in northern Spain.

It is 14.32 km^{2} (5.53 sq mi) in size with a population of 87 (INE 2005).

== Villages ==
- Caranga d'Abaxu
- Caranga d'Arriba
