= Mamin (name) =

Mamin (Russian: Мамин) is a surname. Mainly, it is a Slavic surname, its feminine counterpart is Mamina. The surname is derived from the word мама (mama, meaning "mommy") and literally means Mommy's. It may refer to:

- Alyona Mamina (born 1990), Russian sprinter
- Dmitry Mamin-Sibiryak (1852–1912), Russian author
- Maxim Mamin (ice hockey, born 1988), Russian ice hockey center
- Maxim Mamin (ice hockey, born 1995), Russian ice hockey forward
- Yuri Mamin (born 1946), Russian film director, stage director, screenwriter, composer and author

Mamin (Kazakh: Мамин) is also a Kazakh surname, coming from the Kazakh male given name Mami with the Russified surname suffix -in (like in Putin, Repin). It can refer to:

- Asqar Mamin (born 1965), former Prime Minister of Kazakhstan

== See also ==
- Mamin Kolyu, nickname of Bulgarian revolutionary Nikola Koev Nikolov (1880–1961)
