= Repin =

Repin (Russian: Ре́пин; masculine) or Repina (Ре́пина; feminine) is a Russian last name. It is derived from the sobriquet репа, repa, 'turnip' and may refer to the following people:

- Ilya Repin (1844–1930), Russian painter
- Nikolay Repin (b. 1932), Soviet painter
- Vadim Repin (b. 1971), Russian violinist

== Archaeology ==
- The Repin culture, the first phase (or, depending on the author, the forerunner) of the Pit Grave/Ochre Grave/Yamnaya culture.

== Other uses ==
- Řepín, a village and municipality of the Czech Republic.
- 2468 Repin, a Main-belt Asteroid named after Ilya Repin.

== See also ==
- Repino, several inhabited localities in Russia
