= Tarapacá =

San Lorenzo de Tarapacá Tarapacá
- Town
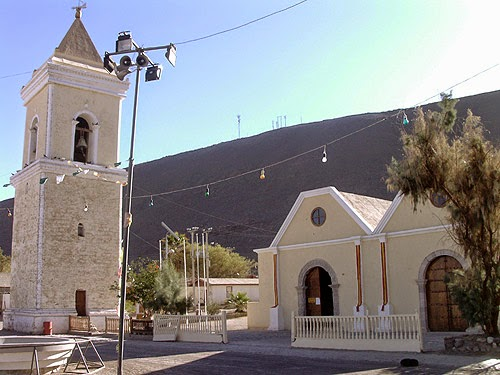
- Church of San Lorenzo

- Location within Chile
- Coordinates: 19°54′S 69°30′W
- Country: Chile
- Region: Tarapacá
- Province: Tamarugal
- Commune: Huara
- Founded: 1717
- Elevation: 1,350 m (4,430 ft)

Population
  - Estimate (2002): 135
- Demonym: Tarapacan

San Lorenzo de Tarapacá, also known simply as Tarapacá, is a town in the region of the same name in Chile.

== History ==
The area has likely been inhabited since the 12th century, when it formed part of the Inca Trail to Machu Picchu. When Spanish explorer Diego de Almagro reached the area in 1536, it was already inhabited by locals. After being conquered by the Spanish, the area was part of the Viceroyalty of Peru, and then of the Peruvian state. The current town dates back to 1717.

Tarapacá saw itself the protagonist of the Battle of Tarapacá during the War of the Pacific. Despite the Peruvian victory, the troops located in the area relocated to nearby Arica in the direction of Tacna, allowing the Chilean Army to occupy the area, creating a disadvantage, and was afterwards given to Chile under the Treaty of Ancón. The war had a negative effect on the population, the Peruvian refugees who had formerly inhabited the town were sent by the Peruvian government to the Loreto region in order to populate the area. The areas in which they settled were called Tarapacá and Puerto Arica, in Northern Amazonas. However, after the Salomón–Lozano Treaty, the area was ceded to Colombia, with the original inhabitants moving south to Maynas, next to the Napo River, founding another Puerto Arica and Tarapacá.

The area, rich in saltpeter, contributed to the homonymous industry, and was of such importance that, around the 1920s, the province became a space of constant migration with the arrival of foreigners, mostly from Peru, Bolivia, England, Germany, Spain, as well as Croats from Yugoslavia, which increased the population in the area, going from around 54,000 inhabitants in 1885 to over 115,000 in 1920. As the population increased, so did trade. Goods were imported from the central zone of Chile and neighboring countries, as well as Europe, North America and Asia.

Because of its historical importance, architectural features and archaeological heritage, the town was declared Zona Típica by the Government of Chile in 1973.

The Festival of San Lorenzo is a religious celebration occurring every year in Tarapacá. It begins on 6 August.

== Notable people ==
- Ramón Castilla, President of Peru.
- Antonio Gutiérrez de la Fuente, military leader and provisional President of Peru.
- Bautista van Schouwen, Chilean marxist, founder of the Revolutionary Left Movement

== See also ==
- Huayra furnace
- Department of Tarapacá (Peru)
