= Mamiña =

Village in Chile

Coordinates: 20°05′S 69°14′W

Mamiña is a small village in northern Chile located 130 kilometres (81 mi) east from Iquique at 2800 metres (9.340 ft.) above sea level in the foothills of Los Andes Mountain range. Famous for its many hot springs that reach surface at 70 Cº, which are claimed to be beneficial for skin and bones. It has some hotels and hostels and basic services.
