= Camiña =

- Commune
- Coat of arms Map of Camiña in Tarapacá Region Location in Chile
- Coordinates: 19°18′46″S 69°25′34″W
- Country: Chile
- Region: Tarapacá
- Province: Tamarugal

Government
  - Type: Municipality

Area
  - Total: 2,200.2 km^{2} (849.5 sq mi)
- Elevation: 2,406 m (7,894 ft)

Population (2012 census)
  - Total: 1,156
  - Density: 0.5254/km^{2} (1.361/sq mi)
  - Urban: 0
  - Rural: 1,275

Sex
  - Men: 676
  - Women: 599
- Time zone: UTC-4 (CLT)
  - Summer (DST): UTC-3 (CLST)
- Area code: (+56) 5

Camiña is a Chilean commune and village in El Tamarugal Province, Tarapacá Region. According to the 2002 census, the commune population was 1,275 and has an area of 2,200.2 km^{2} (850 sq mi).

== Demographics ==
According to the 2002 census of the National Statistics Institute, Camiña had 1,275 inhabitants (676 men and 599 women), and it is entirely rural. The population fell by 10.3% (147 persons) between the 1992 and 2002 censuses.

== Administration ==
As a commune, Camiña is a third-level administrative division of Chile administered by a municipal council, headed by an alcalde who is directly elected every four years.

Within the electoral divisions of Chile, Camiña is represented in the Chamber of Deputies by Marta Isasi (Ind.) and Hugo Gutiérrez (PC) as part of the 2nd electoral district, which includes the entire Tarapacá Region. The commune is represented in the Senate by José Miguel Insulza (PS, 2018–2026) and José Durana (UDI, 2018–2026) as part of the 1st senatorial constituency (Arica and Parinacota Region and Tarapacá Region).
