= Colchane =

- Commune
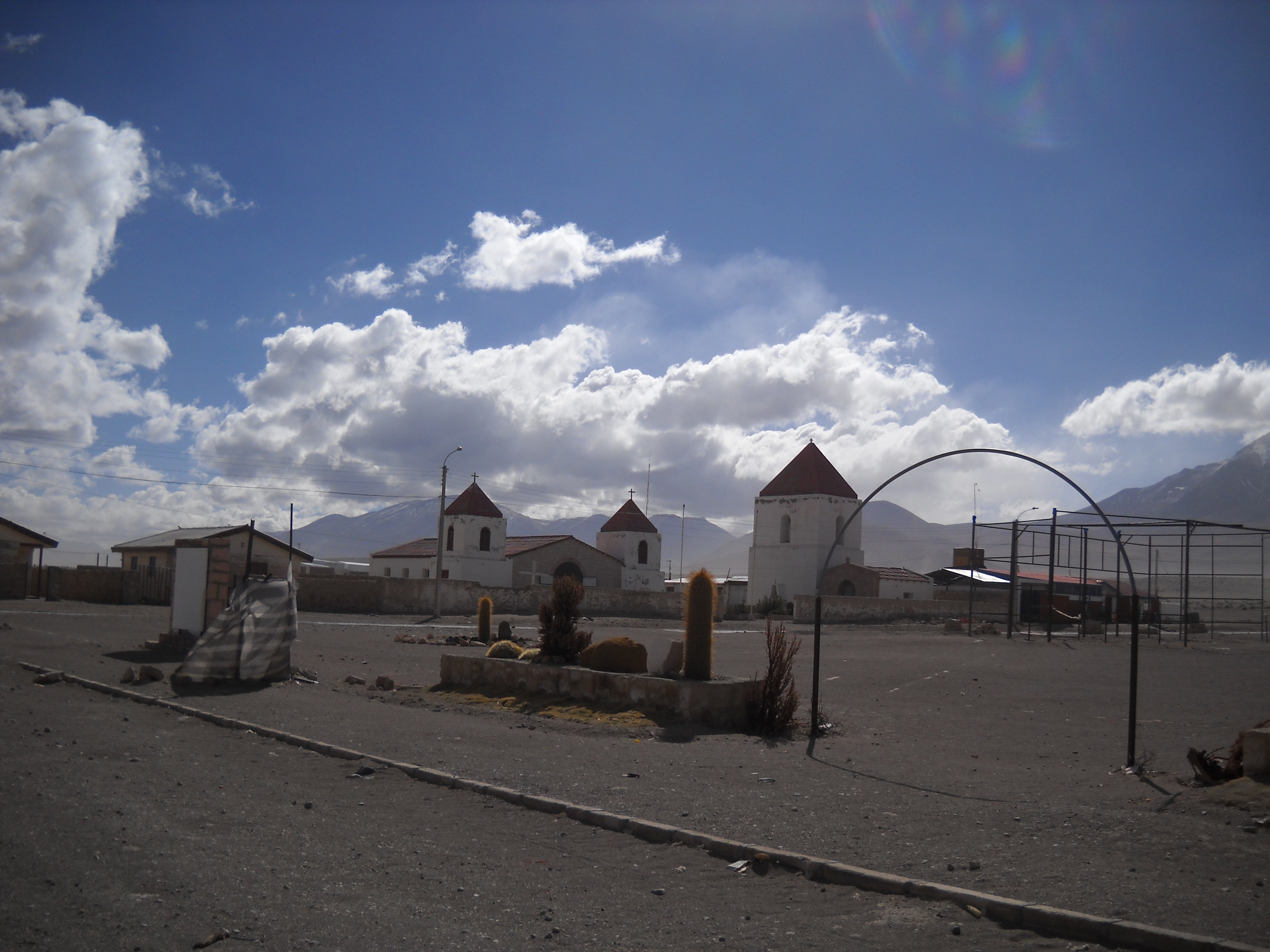

- Flag Coat of arms Map of Colchane in Tarapacá Region Location in Chile
- Coordinates: 19°17′S 68°38′W
- Country: Chile
- Region: Tarapacá
- Province: Tamarugal

Government
  - Type: Municipal council
  - Alcalde: Javier García Choque

Area
  - Total: 4,015.6 km^{2} (1,550.4 sq mi)
- Elevation: 3,702 m (12,146 ft)

Population (2017 Census)
  - Total: 1,728
  - Density: 0.4303/km^{2} (1.115/sq mi)
  - Urban: 0
  - Rural: 1,728

Sex
  - Men: 995
  - Women: 733
- Time zone: UTC-4 (CLT)
  - Summer (DST): UTC-3 (CLST)
- Area code: (+56) 5

Colchane is a Chilean village and commune in Tamarugal Province, Tarapacá Region.

The commune is located in the Andean altiplano, bordering Bolivia. It also includes the localities of Isluga, Enquelga, Cariquima and Chijo.

== Demographics ==
According to the 2017 census of the National Statistics Institute, Colchane had 1,728 inhabitants (995 men and 733 women), and it is entirely rural. The total population grew by 4,79% (79 persons) between the 2002 and 2017 censuses. However, broken down by sex, only the male population increased (85 more men), while the female population decreased (6 fewer women). It has the country's highest rate of people living under the poverty line at 34.56% (Encuesta Casen, 2006).

== Administration ==
As a commune, Colchane is a third-level administrative division of Chile administered by a municipal council, headed by an alcalde who is directly elected every four years.

Within the electoral divisions of Chile, Colchane is represented in the Chamber of Deputies by Marta Isasi (Ind.) and Hugo Gutiérrez (PC) as part of the 2nd electoral district, which includes the entire Tarapacá Region. The commune is represented in the Senate by José Miguel Insulza (PS, 2018–2026) and José Durana (UDI, 2018–2026) as part of the 1st senatorial constituency (Arica and Parinacota Region and Tarapacá Region).
