= Huara =

- Commune
- Coat of arms Map of Huara in Tarapacá Region Location in Chile
- Coordinates: 19°59′S 69°47′W
- Country: Chile
- Region: Tarapacá
- Province: Tamarugal

Government
  - Type: Municipal council
  - Alcalde: José Bartolo (UDI)

Area
  - Total: 10,474.6 km^{2} (4,044.3 sq mi)

Population (2017 Census)
  - Total: 2,730
  - Density: 0.261/km^{2} (0.675/sq mi)
  - Urban: 1,109
  - Rural: 1,621

Sex
  - Male: 1,501
  - Female: 1,229
- Time zone: UTC-4 (CLT)
  - Summer (DST): UTC-3 (CLST)
- Area code: (+56) 5
- Website: www.municipalidaddehuara.cl

Huara is a Chilean town and commune in Tamarugal Province, Tarapacá Region. It is located 45 km (28 mi) or (75 km (47 mi) by road) northeast of Iquique. The village is crossed by the Pan-American Highway and is the crossing point for the road that goes to Oruro in Bolivia. This road also serves as access to the Atacama Giant site and the Volcán Isluga National Park.

The commune also comprises the Pisagua and Tarapacá hamlets.

Huara was badly damaged during an earthquake in 2005.

== Demographics ==
According to the 2002 census of the National Statistics Institute Huara had 2,599 inhabitants (1,499 men and 1,100 women), making it an entirely rural area. The population grew by 1.8% (627 persons) between the 1992 and 2002 censuses.

== Administration ==
As a commune, Huara is a third-level administrative division of Chile administered by a municipal council, headed by an alcalde (mayor) who is directly elected every four years. Since 2016 the mayor has been José Bartolo Vinaya (UDI). For the 2021-2024 term, the communal council has the following members:

- Lorena Baltazar Lucay (RN)
- Narciso Remos Esteban (RN)
- Daniel Olivares Riega (UDI)
- Carlos Carvajal Gallarado (Ind./FA)
- Raúl Uribe Tiayna (Ind./FA)
- Nellie Prenafeta Flores (PR)

Within the electoral divisions of Chile, Huara is represented in the Chamber of Deputies by Mrs. Marta Isasi (Ind.) and Mr. Hugo Gutiérrez (PC) as part of the 2nd electoral district, which includes the entire Tarapacá Region. The commune is represented in the Senate by José Miguel Insulza (PS, 2018–2026) and José Durana (UDI, 2018–2026) as part of the 1st senatorial constituency (Arica and Parinacota Region and Tarapacá Region).
