= Tarapacá Region =

Region of Chile

Tarapacá Region Región de Tarapacá
- Region
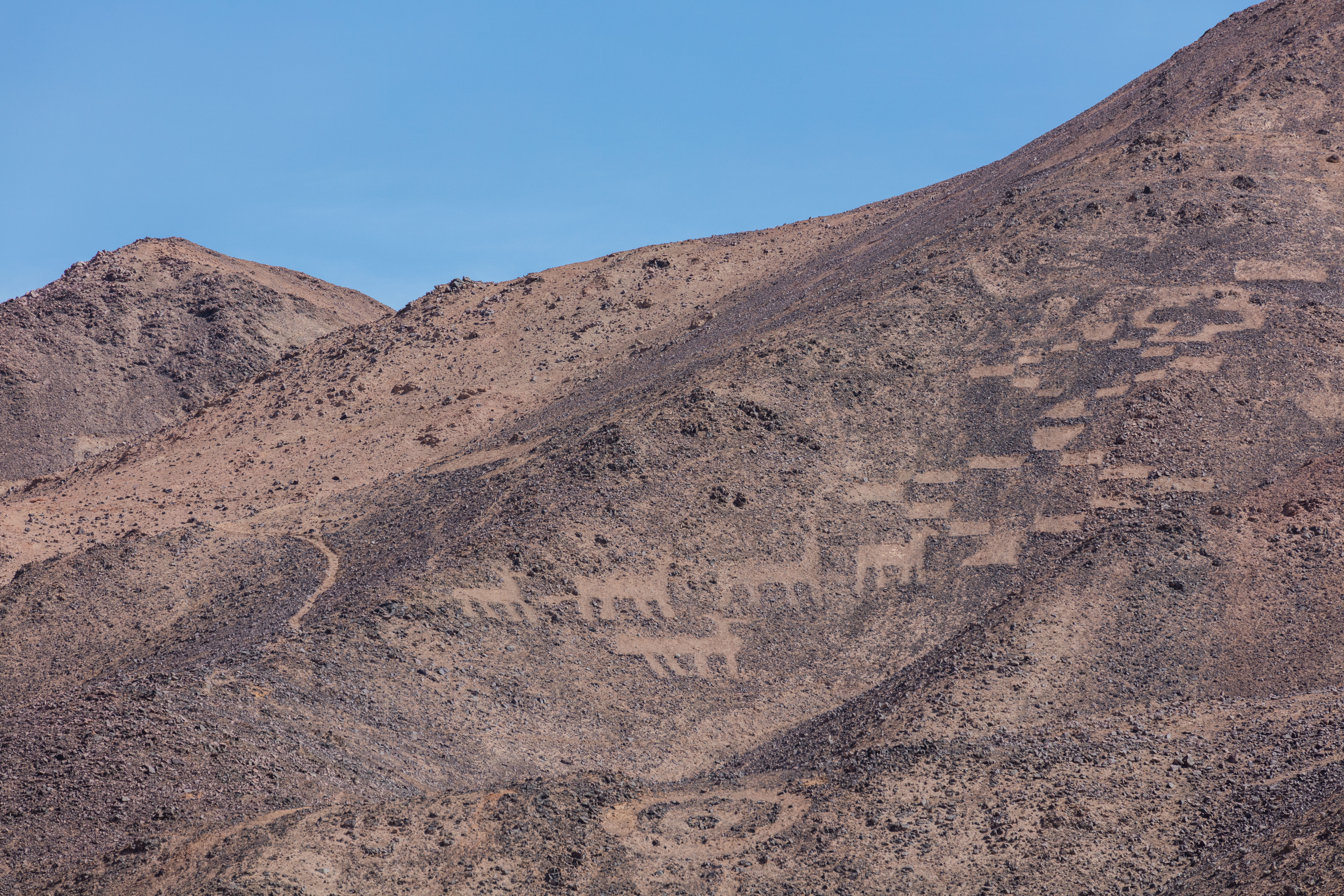
- Cerros Pintados geoglyphs, Pampa del Tamarugal National Reserve

- Flag Seal Coat of arms

- Map of Tarapacá Region
- Coordinates: 20°17′S 69°20′W
- Country: Chile
- Capital: Iquique
- Provinces: Iquique, Tamarugal

Government
  - Intendant: Miguel Quezada Torres (UDI)

Area
  - Total: 41,799.5 km^{2} (16,138.9 sq mi)
  - Rank: 6
- Lowest elevation: 0 m (0 ft)

Population (2024 census)
  - Total: 369,806
  - Rank: 12
  - Density: 8.84714/km^{2} (22.9140/sq mi)
- Demonym(s): tarapaqueño, -a (Spanish)

GDP (PPP)
  - Total: $9.076 billion (2014)
  - Per capita: $27,604 (2014)
- ISO 3166 code: CL-TA
- HDI (2022): 0.887 very high
- Website: Official website (in Spanish)

The Tarapacá Region (Spanish: Región de Tarapacá, pronounced [taɾapaˈka]) is one of Chile's 16 first-order administrative divisions. It comprises two provinces, Iquique and Tamarugal. It borders the Chilean Arica y Parinacota Region to the north, Bolivia's Oruro Department and Potosí Department on the east, Chile's Antofagasta Region to the south and the Pacific Ocean to the west. The port city of Iquique is the region's capital.

Much of the region was once part of Peru, having been annexed by Chile under the 1883 Treaty of Ancón at the close of the War of the Pacific. The region was important economically as a site of intense saltpeter mining, before synthetic nitrate manufacturing became possible. A number of abandoned mining towns can still be found in the region.

The present day Tarapacá Region was created in 2007 by subdividing the former Tarapacá Region under Law No. 20,175, which was signed by President Michelle Bachelet in Arica.

== History ==
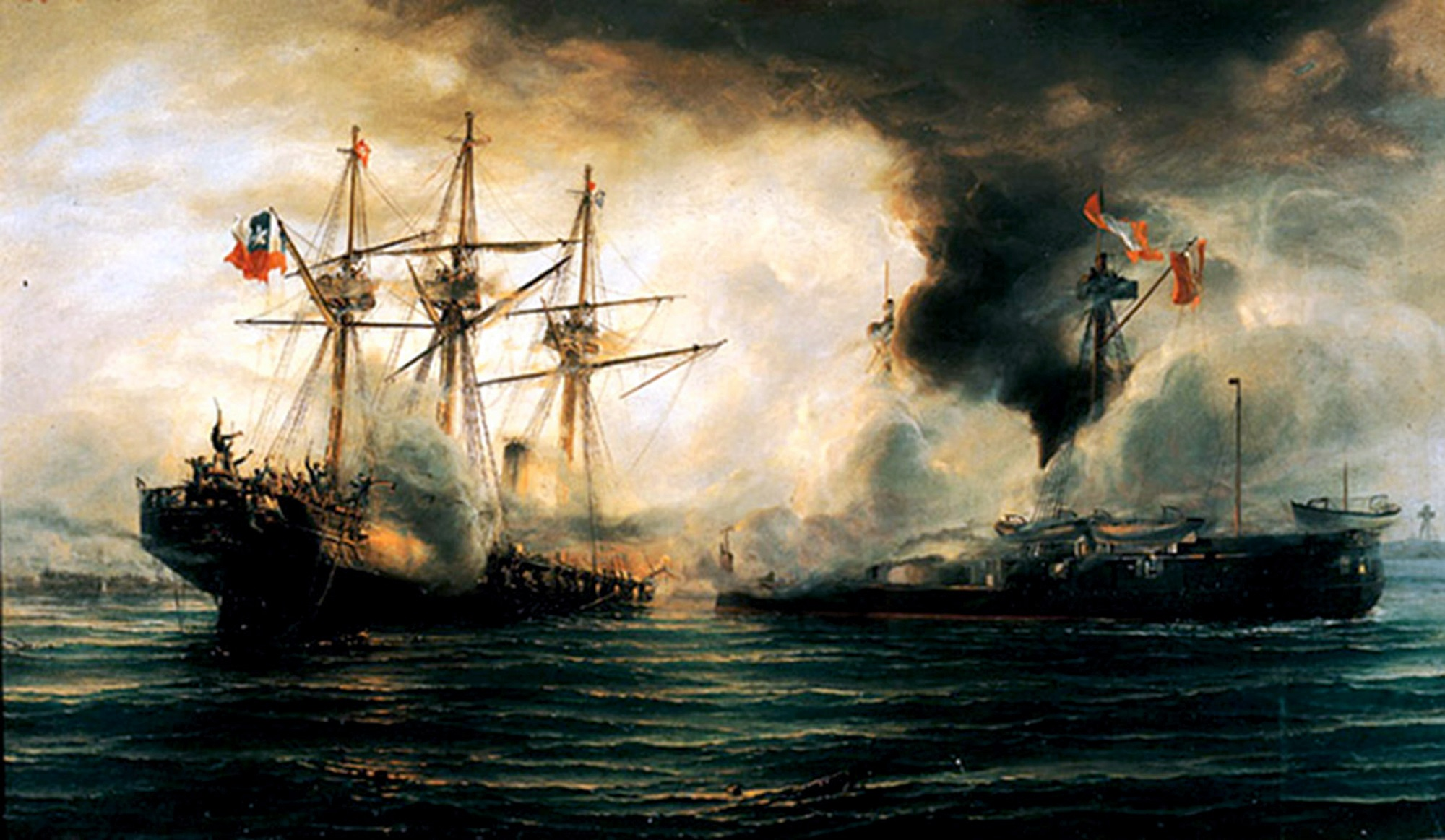
Sinking of the Esmeralda during the battle of Iquique

This region has been inhabited by various Indigenous populations, most notably the Chinchorro culture more than 10,000 years ago. It was later inhabited by nomadic groups of gatherers and fishers. At the time of the Inca invasion, the territory of the region was occupied by the Changos along the entire coastal area, the Aymara in the Andean highlands, and the Atacameños in the south, especially near the Loa River. The Inca invasion was successful, and the region was annexed to the Empire. After the Spanish conquest, the territory was administered by the Viceroyalty of Peru until 1824, when it passed from Spanish control to the Republic of Peru, remaining Peruvian territory until 1879, during the War of the Pacific.

Fray Antonio Rendón Sarmiento celebrated the first Mass on the feast day of Saint Lawrence in San Lorenzo de Tarapacá, a small village that today has fewer than 100 inhabitants and is located in the middle of the desert. With the independence of Peru in 1821, the region became part of the Department of Arequipa, later the Department of Moquegua in 1857, and finally achieved the status of the Department of Tarapacá in 1877.

During the War of the Pacific in 1879, the Chilean army invaded the Peruvian Department of Tarapacá, turning the area into the site of the main battles of the conflict. The beginning of the major engagements occurred with the Battle of Arica on 7 June 1880. After these battles, Chile took control of the territories and began a process of colonization.

The Treaty of Ancón (1884) established the permanent transfer of the Department of Tarapacá to Chile, as well as the temporary administration of the provinces of Arica and Tacna until a plebiscite could be held. This plebiscite never took place; instead, the Treaty of Lima (1929) was signed, returning Tacna to Peru and definitively ceding Arica to Chile. The treaty also stipulates that Chile may not transfer sovereignty over the region without prior consultation with Peru.

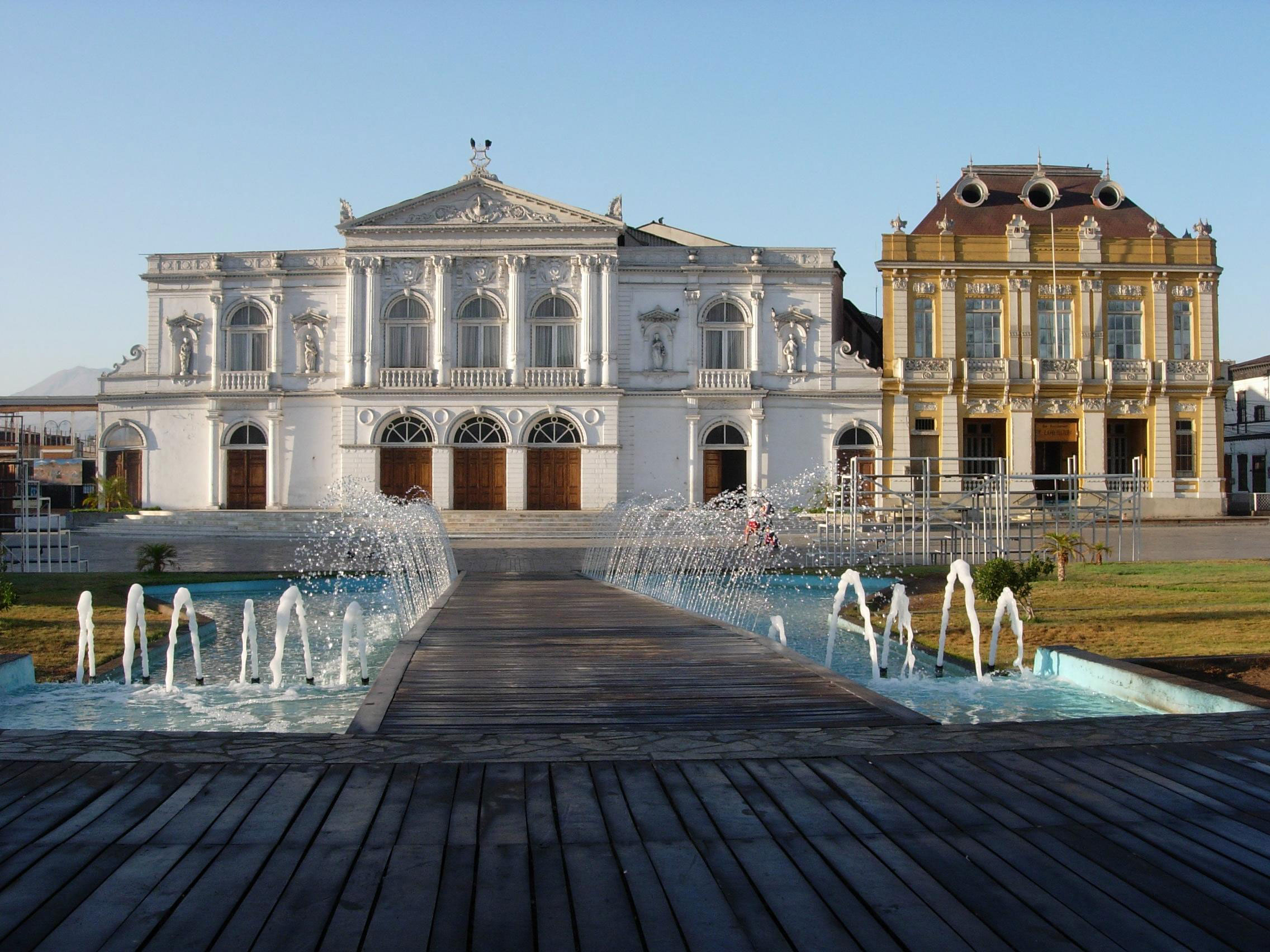
Municipal Theatre of Iquique, built during the nitrate boom

The exploitation of saltpeter (nitrate) enabled the development of the region. Pisagua and Iquique became major ports, and numerous nitrate offices were established. The economy flourished, and the nitrate boom generated substantial revenue for the Chilean state from the late 19th century to the early 20th century. However, most companies were owned by European and North American interests, and workers were subjected to a harsh and exploitative system. Several protests took place in which workers and their families demanded fair wages and dignified living conditions. The most significant protest occurred in 1907, when workers of various nationalities marched to the Santa María School to pressure local authorities to support their cause; they were ultimately killed by military units in the Santa María School massacre of Iquique (1907). The boom ended in the mid-1920s with the creation of synthetic nitrate, leading to economic collapse in the region, famine, and the closure of thousands of small settlements scattered across the desert.

In mid-2005, a strong earthquake with a magnitude of 7.9 on the Richter scale, with its epicenter near the town of Camiña, devastated small inland villages.

The existence of two major cities competing for regional leadership led to a long-standing rivalry between Arica and Iquique. This situation resulted in the creation of the Arica and Parinacota Region, which comprises the provinces of Arica and Parinacota, while the former province of Iquique was divided into two. Law No. 20,175 was promulgated on 23 March 2007 by President Michelle Bachelet in the city of Arica and came into force on 8 October 2007. On 9 October, during a ceremony held at the former nitrate office Santiago Humberstone, the Province of Tamarugal officially came into effect.

== Administration ==
The government of the region resides in the intendant, who is assigned by the president. Each of the region's two provinces are further subdivided into communes.

Province	Capital	Commune	Other towns
Iquique	Iquique	Iquique	
Iquique	Iquique	Alto Hospicio	
Tamarugal	Pozo Almonte		
Tamarugal	Pozo Almonte	Huara	Pisagua
Tamarugal	Pozo Almonte	Camiña	
Tamarugal	Pozo Almonte	Colchane	
Tamarugal	Pozo Almonte	Pica	
Tamarugal	Pozo Almonte	Pozo Almonte	Mamiña

== Geography ==
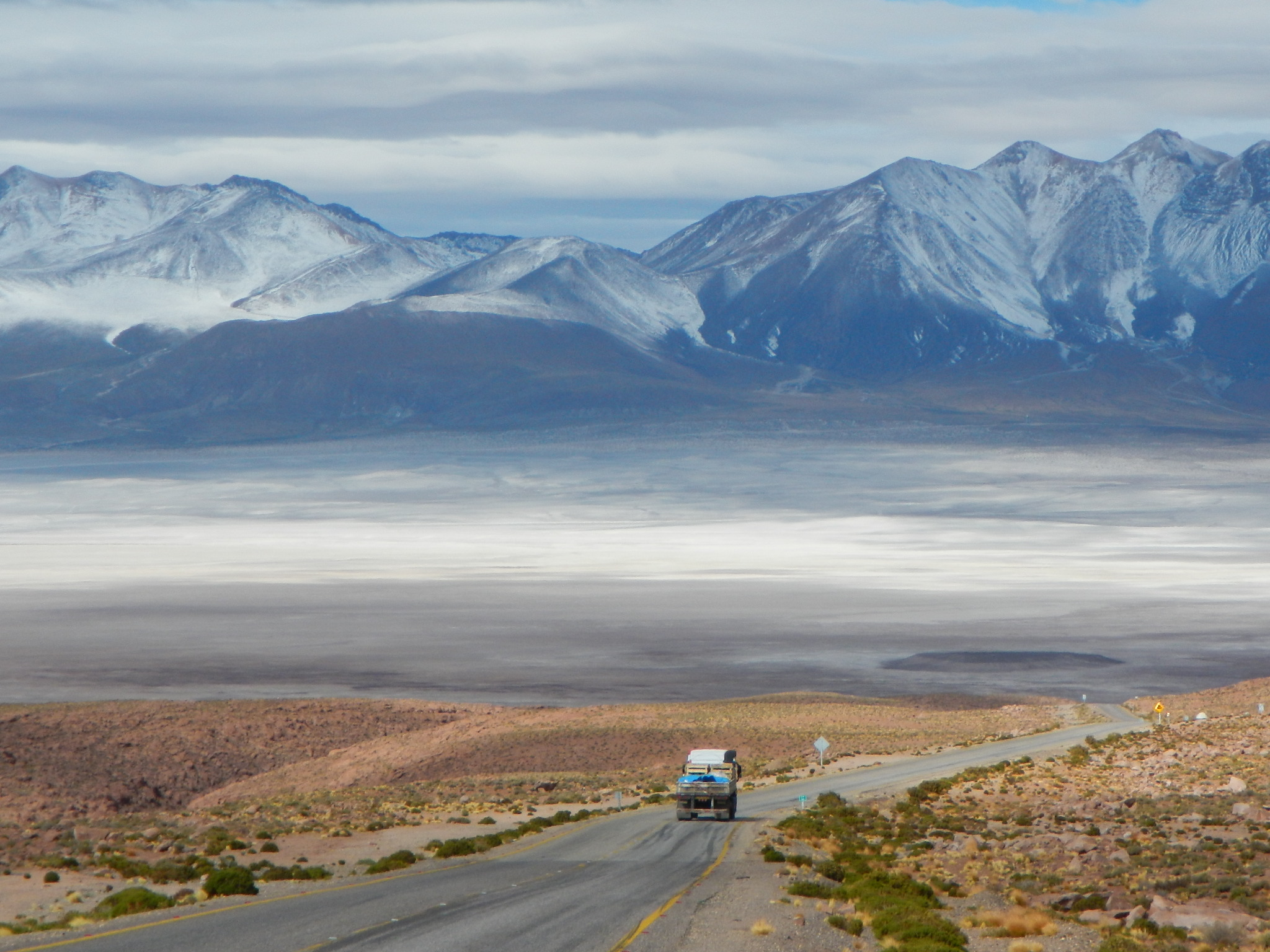
Salar de Coposa

Tarapacá has an area of 42,225 km^{2}, which in terms of size is comparable to that of Switzerland.

Due to its location, it is a region with desert characteristics. Its geography is composed of five clearly demarcated longitudinal zones. Coastal plains are extremely scarce and almost nonexistent, with the exception of Iquique, due to the presence of the Coastal Range, which begins at Cerro Camaraca, 30 kilometers south of the Line of Concordia, in the neighboring Arica and Parinacota Region. This range does not reach great elevations but drops abruptly into the sea. The Intermediate Depression reaches approximately 40 kilometers in width and 500 kilometers in length. Between ravines, the so-called pampas are formed, the largest of which is the Pampa del Tamarugal. This area marks the beginning of the Atacama Desert.

The Andes mountain range is divided into two branches: an eastern branch that runs through Bolivia and a western branch that passes through Chile. Here are found several volcanoes rising above 5,000 meters above sea level, such as Isluga. The Altiplano, located between the eastern and western ranges, has an average elevation of 4,000 meters. It is home to Laguna Quantija, salt flats such as Huasco and Coposa, and bofedales (high-altitude wetlands). These areas host great biodiversity, including animals such as llamas, guanacos, vicuñas, alpacas, and flamingos, as well as flora such as llareta. The high altitude causes altitude sickness (locally known as mal de altura or puna) in many people, due to lower atmospheric pressure than they are accustomed to.

== Climate ==
The climate differs markedly between the coast, the pampas, and the Altiplano. Along the coast, temperatures are mild due to the moderating effect of the sea, remaining throughout the year between 20 °C and 25 °C. The Altiplano experiences very sharp temperature changes, ranging from 30 °C during the day to −30 °C at night. Similar variations occur in the desert, though never reaching such low temperatures. Precipitation is virtually nonexistent, but the little that does occur usually falls in the Andean puna during the austral summer (February). This phenomenon is known as the Altiplanic winter or Bolivian High.

In the coastal sector, temperatures are pleasant, with little daily or seasonal variation. Toward the interior, considered an absolute desert, atmospheric dryness is extreme and daily thermal oscillations are very pronounced.

In the region, four types of drainage basins can be distinguished: the Altiplano basins of Chile (some extending into Bolivia); exorheic basins located in the far north (the Camiña ravine) or south (the Loa River basin and the Salar de Llamara); the large endorheic basin of the Pampa del Tamarugal; and the coastal basins between Tilviche and the Loa River.

== Economic activities ==
- Fishing
- Tourism
- Mining
  - Cerro Colorado
  - Collahuasi

== See also ==
- 2007 Tocopilla earthquake
- Coastal Cliff of northern Chile
- Pulpería
