= Tamarugal Province =

Tamarugal Province Provincia de Tamarugal
- Province
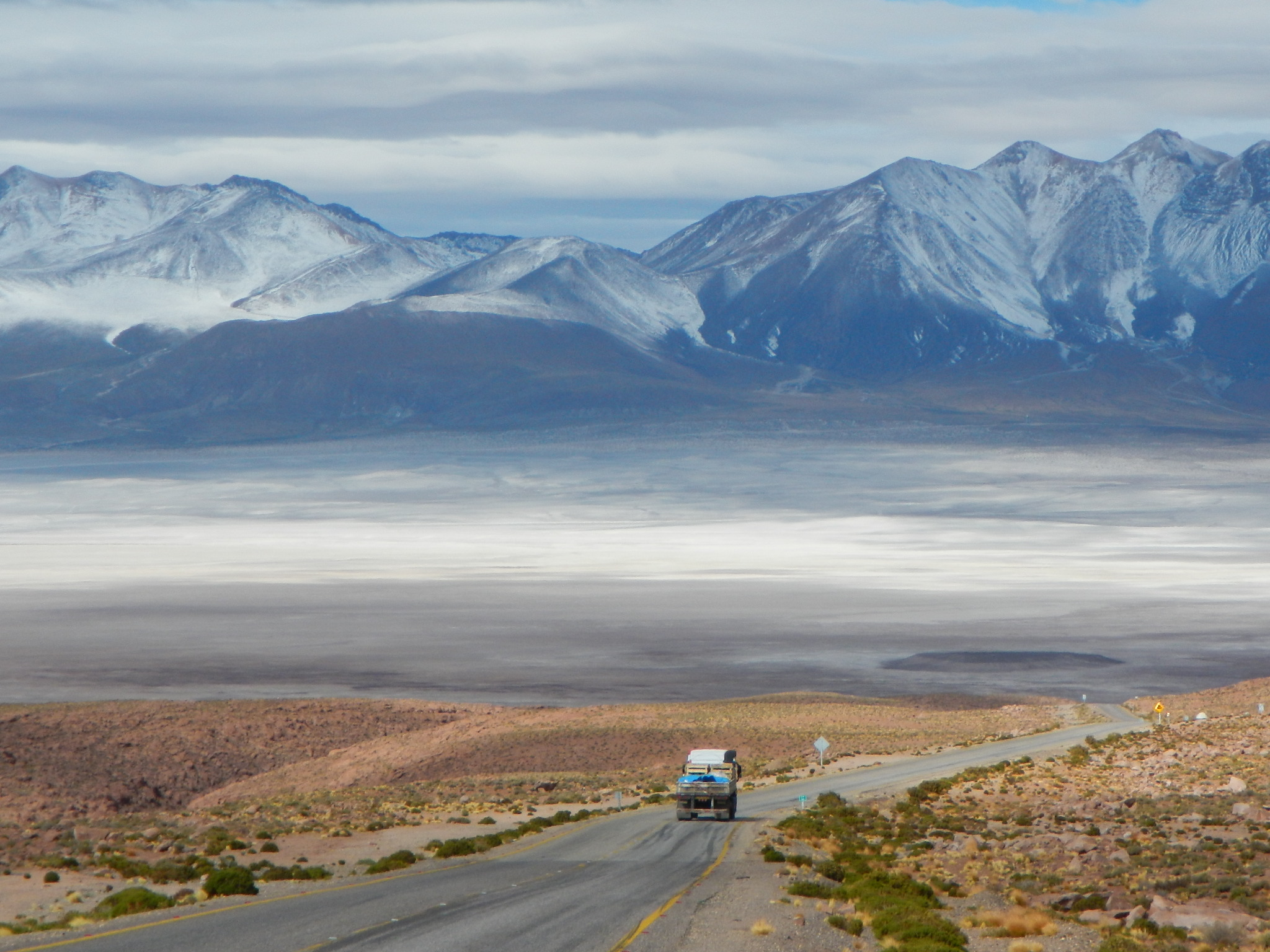
- Salar de Coposa

- Seal

- Location in the Tarapacá Region

- Location in Chile
- Coordinates: 20°15′34″S 69°47′10″W
- Country: Chile
- Region: Tarapacá
- Capital: Pozo Almonte
- Communes: List of 5: Pozo Almonte; Huara; Pica; Camiña; Colchane

Government
  - Type: Provincial
  - Presidential Provincial Delegate: Luz Eliana González Millas (Comunes)

Area
  - Total: 39,390.5 km^{2} (15,208.8 sq mi)
  - Rank: 1

Population (2012 Census)
  - Total: 20,053
  - Rank: 2
  - Density: 0.50908/km^{2} (1.3185/sq mi)
  - Urban: 11,876
  - Rural: 10,655

Sex
  - Men: 14,175
  - Women: 8,356
- Time zone: UTC-4 (CLT)
  - Summer (DST): [[UTC-3 ] postal_code_type =]] (CLST)
- Area code: 56 + 57
- Website: Government of Tamarugal

Tamarugal Province (Spanish: Provincia de Tamarugal) is one of two provinces in the northern Chilean region of Tarapacá, the other being the Iquique Province. Tamarugal Province spans most of the breadth of Chile, between the Pacific Ocean and Bolivia, where it borders on Oruro Department and Potosí Department. The capital is the city of Pozo Almonte.

== Name ==
The province is named after Pampa del Tamarugal. Spanish name:

- Provincia de Tamarugal: Used by the government of the province.
- Provincia del Tamarugal: Used by the government of Chile. Derived from the name El Tamarugal.
- Provincia El Tamarugal: Derived from the name El Tamarugal.

== Geography and demography ==
According to the 2002 census by the National Statistics Institute (INE), the province spans an area of 39,390.5 km^{2} (15,209 sq mi) and had a population of 22,531 inhabitants (14,175 men and 8,356 women). It is the seventh largest and ninth least populated province in the country with a population density of 0.6/km^{2} (2/sq mi). Between the 1992 and 2002 censuses, the population grew by 63.5% (8,748 persons).

== Administration ==
The province is administered by a presidentially appointed delegate. Luz Eliana González Millas was appointed by president Gabriel Boric.

== Communes ==
As a province, Tamarugal is a second-level administrative division of Chile, which is further subdivided into five communes (comunas).

Commune	Area (km^{2})	2002 population	Density (km^{2})	Government website
Pozo Almonte (Capital)	13,765.8	10,830	0.8	link
Pica	8,934.3	6,178	0.7	link
Huara	10,474.6	2,599	0.2	link
Colchane	4,015.6	1,649	0.4	link
Camiña	2,200.2	1,275	0.6	none
Province	39,390.5	22,531	0.6	link
