= Pampa del Tamarugal Aquifer =

Coordinates: 20°32′49.8″S 69°40′39.18″W

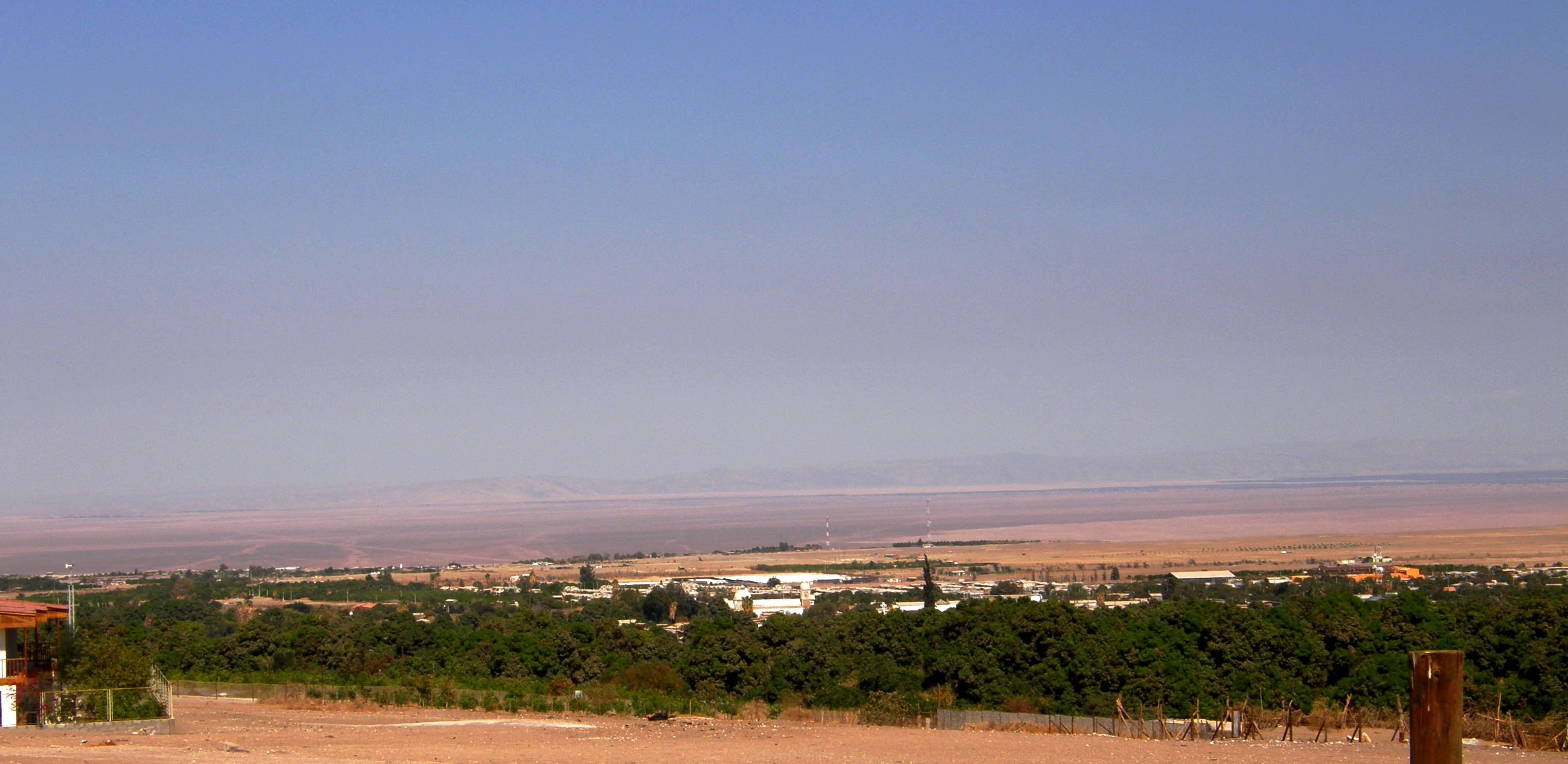
View of Pica town and oasis in the foreground from the southeast. In the background the flat land of Pampa del Tamarugal can be seen.

Pampa del Tamarugal Aquifer (Spanish: acuífero de la Pampa del Tamarugal) located in Tarapacá Region of northern Chile is one of the most important aquifers of Atacama Desert.

At the oasis of Puquio de Núñez the water of the aquifer is tapped by a system of underground aqueducts known as puquios. Located 1,187 meters above sea level (m asl.) the water at Puquio de Núñez is estimated to come from a recharge zone at ~3,000 m asl. As nearby oases of Pica and Matilla taps the Pica Aquifer it is thought that the hydraulic divide between the aquifers of Pampa del Tamarugal and Pica should be between Puquio de Núñez and Matilla. There have been some uncertainty whether the waters of Pica Aquifer flows into Pampa del Tamarugal Aquifer as these two aquifers are separated by the Longacho fault line. While this fault may deviate and block part of the flow a 2012 study showed a hydraulic gradient from Matilla to west suggesting that water from Pica Aquifer flow into Pampa del Tamarugal Aquifer.
