= Puquio de Núñez =

Coordinates: 20°36′16.06″S 69°21′10.43″W

Puquio de Núñez is a small oasis and orchard in the Atacama Desert of Chile, in Tamarugal Province. The oasis is irrigated by an underground canal, a puquio tapping Pampa del Tamarugal Aquifer. Puqui de Núñez lies about 10 kilometers south of the nearby oases of Matilla and Pica. As the puquios of Pica and Matilla tap the Pica Aquifer, it is thought that the hydraulic divide between the aquifers of Pampa del Tamarugal and Pica should be between Puquio de Núñez and Matilla.

Located 1,187 meters above sea level (m asl.) the water at Puquio de Núñez is estimated to come from a recharge zone at ~3,000 m asl.
