= Aqueduct (water supply) =

Structure constructed to convey water

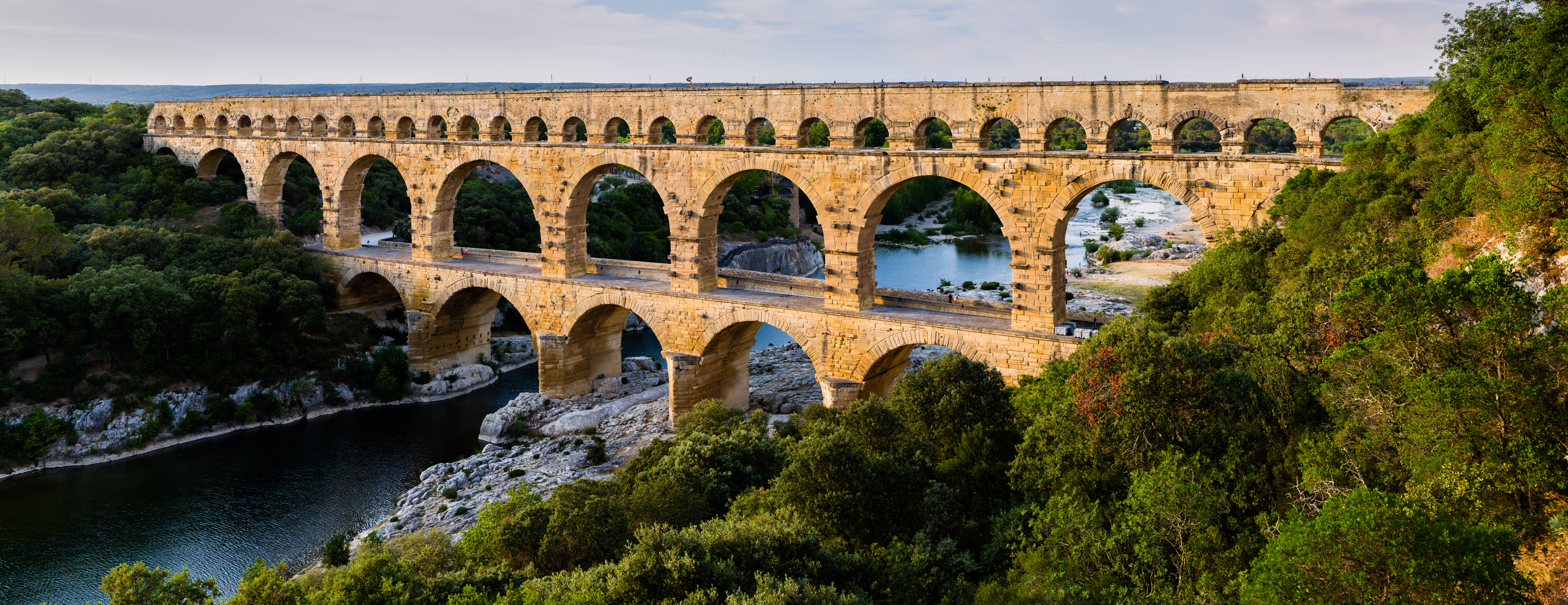
The multiple arches of the Pont du Gard, in Roman Gaul (modern day Southern France). Its lower tiers carry a road across the river, and the upper tiers support an aqueduct conduit that carried water to Nimes.

An aqueduct is a watercourse constructed to carry water from a source to a distribution point far away. In modern engineering, the term aqueduct is used for any system of pipes, ditches, canals, tunnels, and other structures used for this purpose. The term aqueduct also often refers specifically to a bridge carrying an artificial watercourse.

Aqueducts were used in ancient Greece, the ancient Near East, ancient Rome (name gained from Latin: aquaeductus) and pre-Columbian Mexico and Peru. The simplest aqueducts are small ditches cut into the earth. Much larger channels may be used in modern aqueducts. Aqueducts sometimes run for some or all of their path through tunnels constructed underground. Modern aqueducts may also use pipelines. Historically, agricultural societies have constructed aqueducts to irrigate crops and supply large cities with drinking water.

== Etymology ==
The word aqueduct is derived from the Latin words aqua (water) and ductus (led or guided).

== Ancient aqueducts ==
Although particularly associated with the Romans, aqueducts were devised much earlier in Greece, the Near East, Nile Valley, and Indian subcontinent, where people such as the Egyptians and Harappans built sophisticated irrigation systems. The Aztecs and Incans also built such systems independently later. Roman-style aqueducts were used as early as the 7th century BC, when the Assyrians built an 80 km long limestone aqueduct, which included a 10 m high section to cross a 300 m wide valley, to carry water to their capital city, Nineveh.

=== Crete ===
Although particularly associated with the Romans, aqueducts were likely first used by the Minoans around 2000 BC. The Minoans had developed what was then an extremely advanced irrigation system, including several aqueducts.

=== Deccan ===
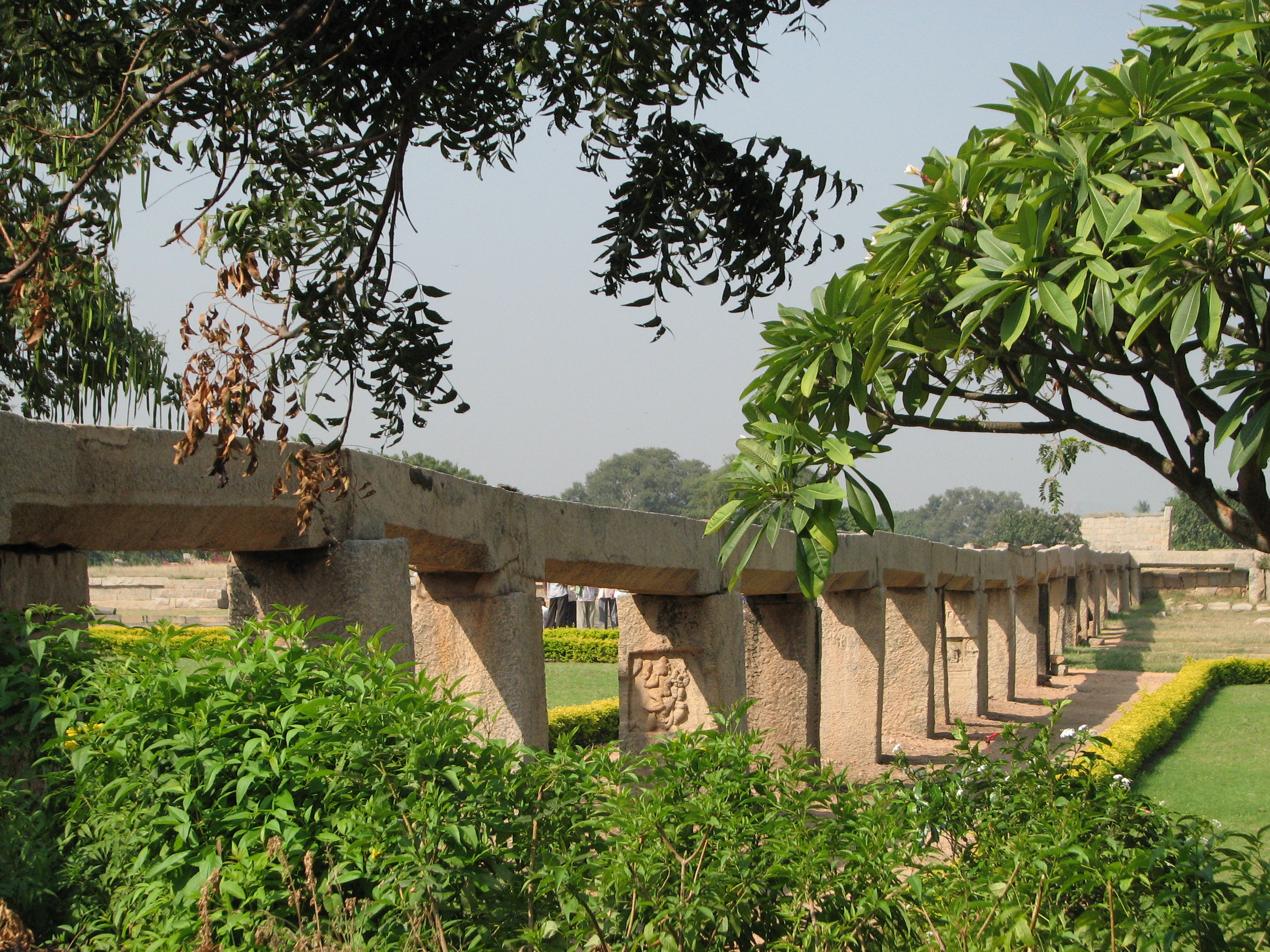
Medieval Deccan aqueduct in Hampi

The Indian subcontinent is believed to have some of the earliest aqueducts. Evidence can be found at the sites of present-day Hampi, Karnataka. The massive aqueducts near Tungabhadra River supplying irrigation water were once 15 miles (24 km) long. The waterways supplied water to royal bath tubs.

=== Oman ===
In Oman from the Iron Age, in Salut, Bat, and other sites, a system of underground aqueducts called falaj or qanāts were constructed, a series of well-like vertical shafts, connected by gently sloping horizontal tunnels.

There are three types of falaj:

- Daudi (داوودية) with underground aqueducts
- Ghaili (الغيلية ) requiring a dam to collect the water
- Aini (العينية ) whose source is a water spring

These enabled large scale agriculture to flourish in a dry land environment.

=== Persia ===
Scheme of a qanat, an underground form of aqueduct popular in ancient Persia

In Persia, starting around 3000 years ago a system of underground aqueducts called qanāts were constructed, a series of well-like vertical shafts, connected by gently sloping tunnels. This technique:

- taps into subterranean water in a manner that delivers water to the surface without the need for pumping. The water drains relied on gravity, with the destination lower than the source, which is typically an upland aquifer.
- allows water to be transported long distances in hot dry climates without losing a large proportion of the source water to seepage and evaporation.

=== Levant ===
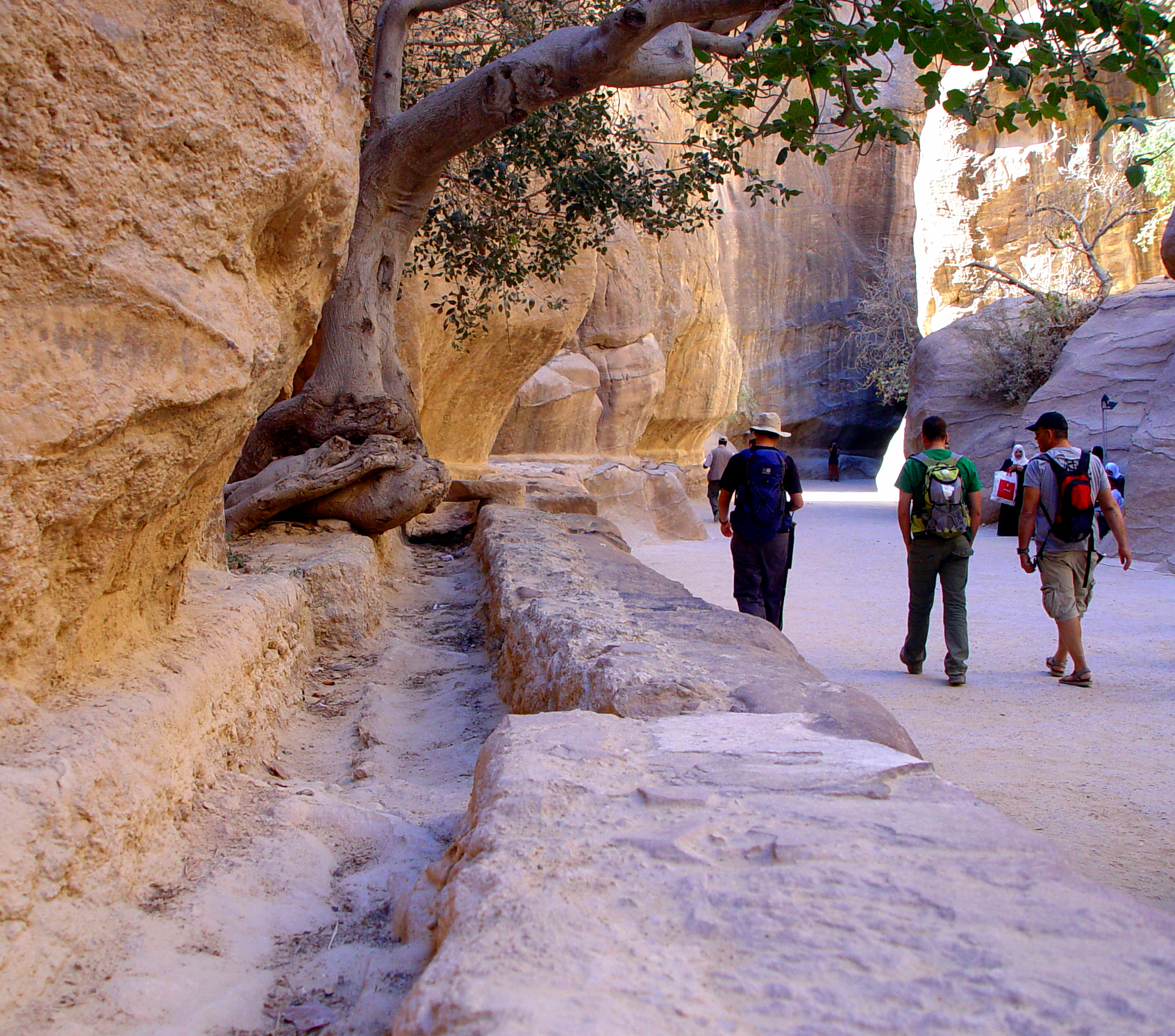
Nabataean aqueduct in Petra, Jordan

Throughout Petra, Jordan, the Nabataean engineers took advantage of every natural spring and every winter downpour to channel water where it was needed. They constructed aqueducts and piping systems that allowed water to flow across mountains, through gorges and into the temples, homes, and gardens of Petra's citizens. Walking through the Siq, one can easily spot the remains of channels that directed water to the city center, as well as durable retention dams that kept powerful flood waters at bay.

In ancient Judea and neighboring territories (in today's Israel and the West Bank), aqueducts evolved from simple channels dug into the earth, as seen at Khirbet Qumran, into more advanced systems of hewn or built stone sealed with waterproof plaster and covered with stone slabs to prevent contamination. Beginning in the Hellenistic period, engineers used inverted siphons (closable pipes that exploited the principle that water rises to its original height) to carry water across deep valleys and up to hilltop sites such as the Hasmonean fortresses of Sartaba and Hyrcania and the Hasmonean palaces near Jericho; by the Roman period, siphons of interlocking stone pipes were used at Hippos and Jerusalem.

The most significant aqueducts of the Roman era in the region served Caesarea Maritima, which lacked a local water source and drew water from springs on Mount Carmel via an arched aqueduct (built under Herod the Great or his successors, with a second one added under Hadrian), and Jerusalem, which had both a "low-level" aqueduct from the Second Temple period (built under either the Hasmoneans or Herod) and a "high-level" aqueduct generally dated to Aelia Capitolina, both fed from Solomon's Pools to the south; ancient historian Josephus recorded that the Roman prefect Pontius Pilate used funds from the Jerusalem Temple treasury to finance aqueduct works in Jerusalem.

=== Greece ===
On the island of Samos, the Tunnel of Eupalinos was built during the reign of Polycrates (538–522 BC). It is considered an underground aqueduct and brought fresh water to Pythagoreion for roughly a thousand years.

=== Roman ===
Roman aqueducts were built in all parts of the Roman Empire, from Germany to Africa, and especially in the city of Rome, where they totalled over 415 kilometres (258 mi). The aqueducts supplied fresh water to public baths and for drinking water, in large cities across the empire, and set a standard of engineering that was not surpassed for more than a thousand years. Bridges, built in stone with multiple arches, were a distinctive feature of Roman aqueducts and hence the term aqueduct is often applied specifically to a bridge for carrying water.

=== South America ===
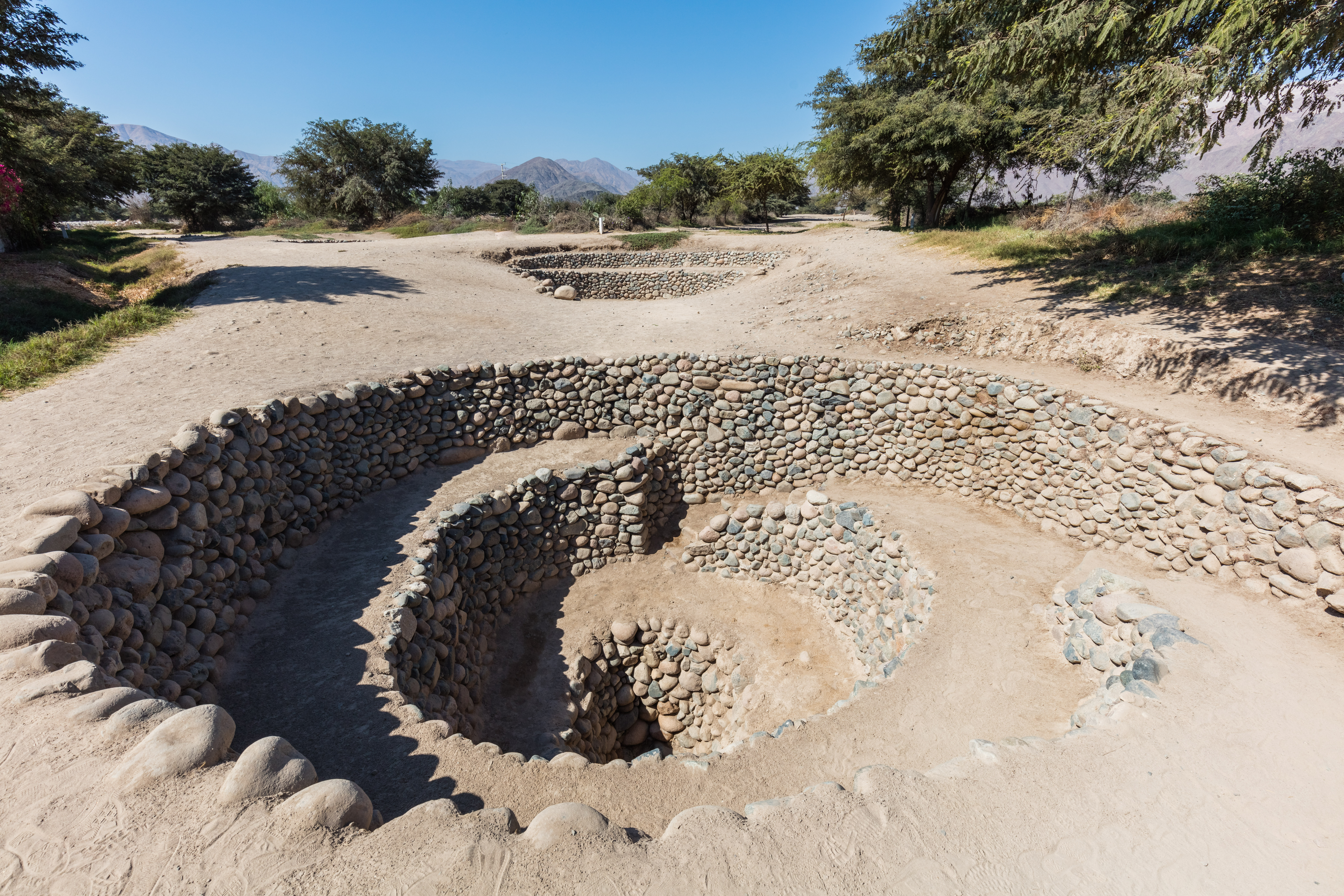
Underground aqueducts of Cantalloc, Nazca, Peru

Near the Peruvian town of Nazca, an ancient pre-Columbian system of aqueducts called puquios were built and are still in use today. They were made of intricately placed stones, a construction material widely used by the Nazca culture. The time period in which they were constructed is still debated, but some evidence supports circa A.D. 540–552, in response to drought periods in the region.

The Guayabo National Monument of Costa Rica, a park covering the largest archaeological site in the country, contains a system of aqueducts. The complex network of uncovered and covered aqueducts still functions well. The aqueducts are constructed from rounded river stones, which are mostly made of volcanic rock. The civilization that constructed the aqueduct system remains a mystery to archaeologists; it is suspected that Guayabo's aqueducts sat at a point of ancient cultural confluence between Aztecs, Mayans, and Incas.

=== North America ===
When Europeans saw the Aztec capital Tenochtitlan, early in the 16th century, the city was watered by two aqueducts. One of these, Chapultepec aqueduct, built c. 1420, was rebuilt by the Spanish almost three hundred years later. Originally tracing part of its path over now-gone Lake Texcoco, only a fragment remains in Mexico City today.

=== Sri Lanka ===
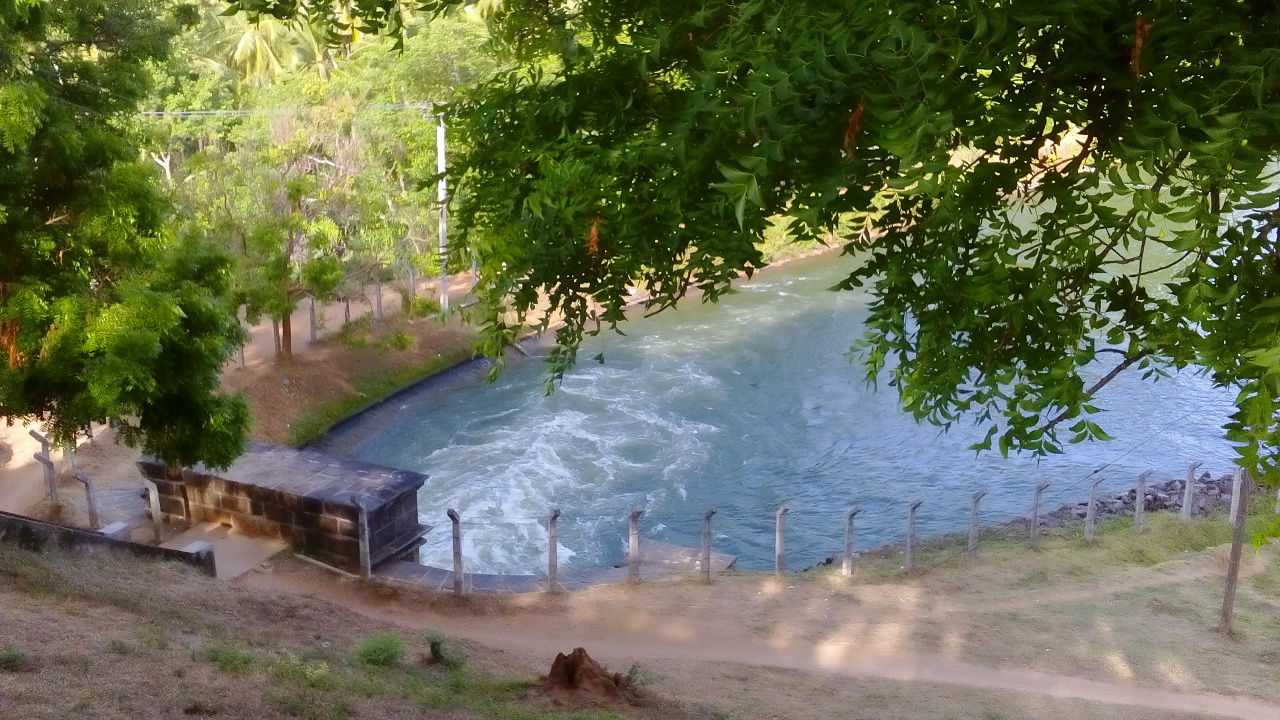
Yodha Ela, Anuradhapura, Sri Lanka

Extensive usage of elaborate aqueducts have been found to have been used in ancient Sri Lanka. The best example is the Yoda Ela or Jaya Ganga, an 87 kilometres (54 mi) long water canal carrying excess water between two artificial reservoirs with a gradient of 10 to 20 cm per kilometer during the fifth century AD. However, the ancient engineering methods in calculating the exact elevation between the two reservoirs and the exact gradient of the canal to such fine precision had been lost with the fall of the civilization in 13th Century.

== Modern aqueducts ==
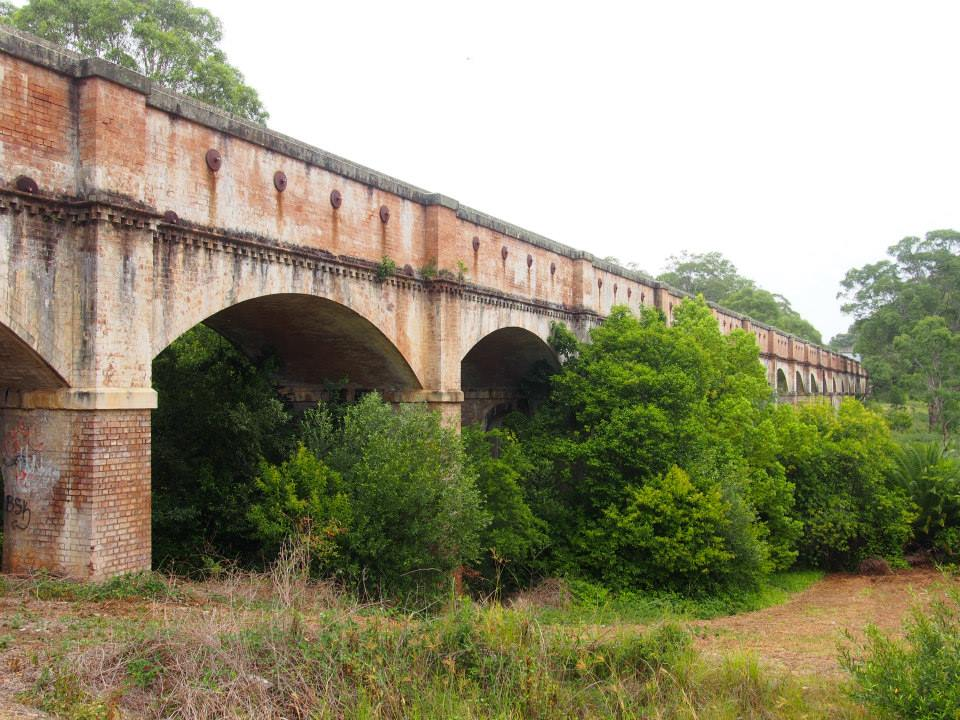
Boothtown Aqueduct, Sydney, Australia

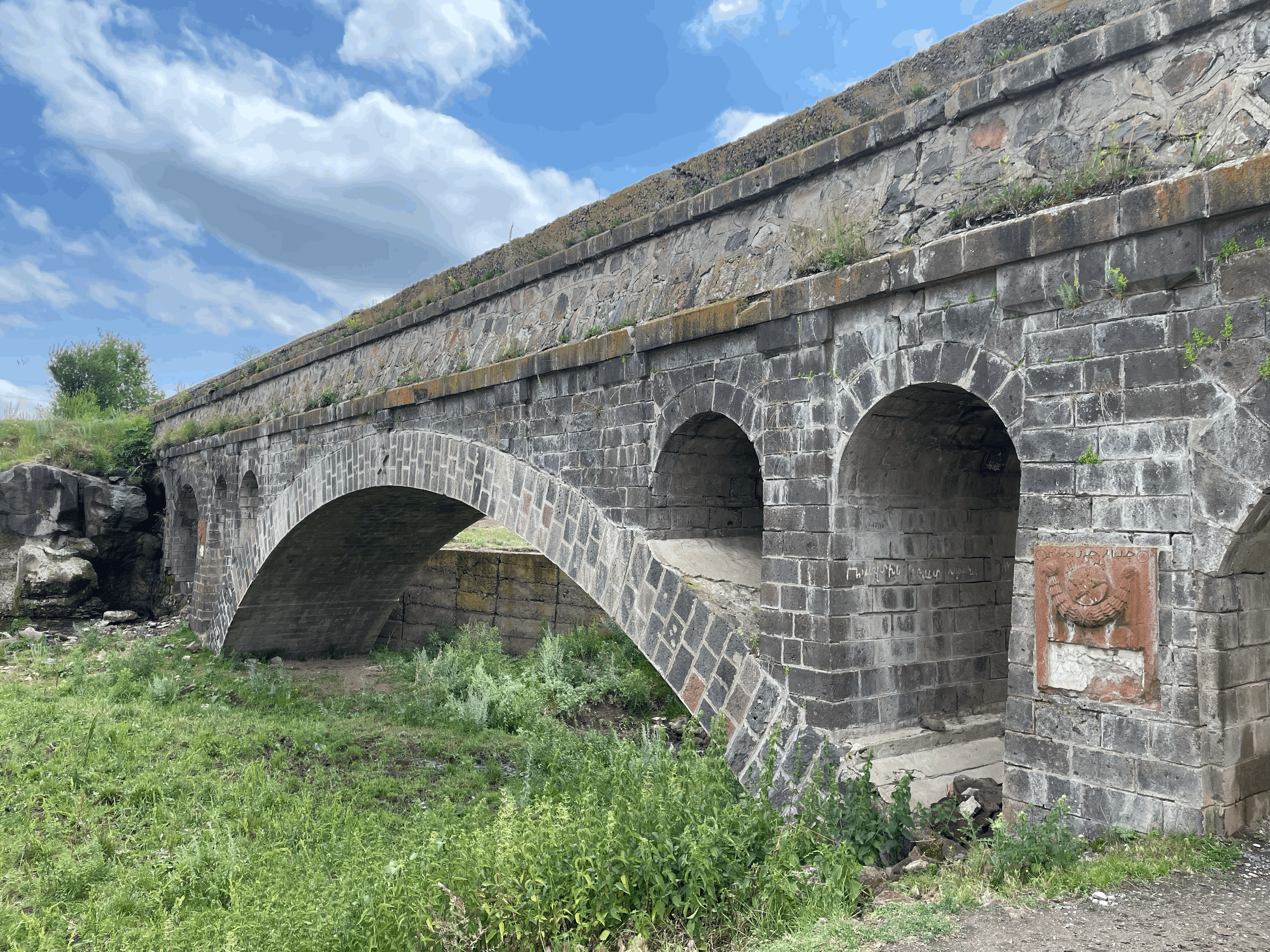
Shira Canal Aqueduct, Maisyan, Armenia

Modern aqueducts are a central part of many countries' water distribution infrastructure. The United States' aqueducts are some of the world's largest. The Catskill Aqueduct carries water to New York City over a distance of 120 miles (190 km), but is dwarfed by aqueducts in the far west of the country, most notably the 242-mile (389-km) Colorado River Aqueduct, which supplies the Los Angeles area with water from the Colorado River nearly 250 miles to the east and the 701.5-mile (1,129.0 km) California Aqueduct, which runs from the Sacramento-San Joaquin River Delta to Lake Perris. The Central Arizona Project is the largest and most expensive aqueduct constructed in the United States. It stretches 336 miles from its source near Parker, Arizona to the metropolitan areas of Phoenix and Tucson.

An aqueduct in New Zealand, "the Oamaru Borough Race", was constructed in the late 19th century to deliver water (and water-power) about 50 km from the Waitaki River at Kurow to the coastal town of Oamaru.

In Spain, the Tagus-Segura Water Transfer system of aqueducts opened in 1979 and transports water 286 kilometres (178 mi) from north to south.

In China, the South–North Water Transfer Project aims to connect the Yangtze River basin to Beijing through three separate systems. The project will reuse part of the Grand Canal of China.

== Design ==
=== Open channels ===
The simplest aqueducts are small ditches cut into the earth. Much larger channels may be used in modern aqueducts, for instance the Central Arizona Project uses 7.3 m (24 ft) wide channels. A major factor in the design of all open channels is its gradient. A higher gradient allows a smaller channel to carry the same amount of water as a larger channel with a lower gradient, but increases the potential of the water to damage the aqueduct's structure. A typical Roman aqueduct had a gradient of about 1:4800.

==== Artificial rills ====
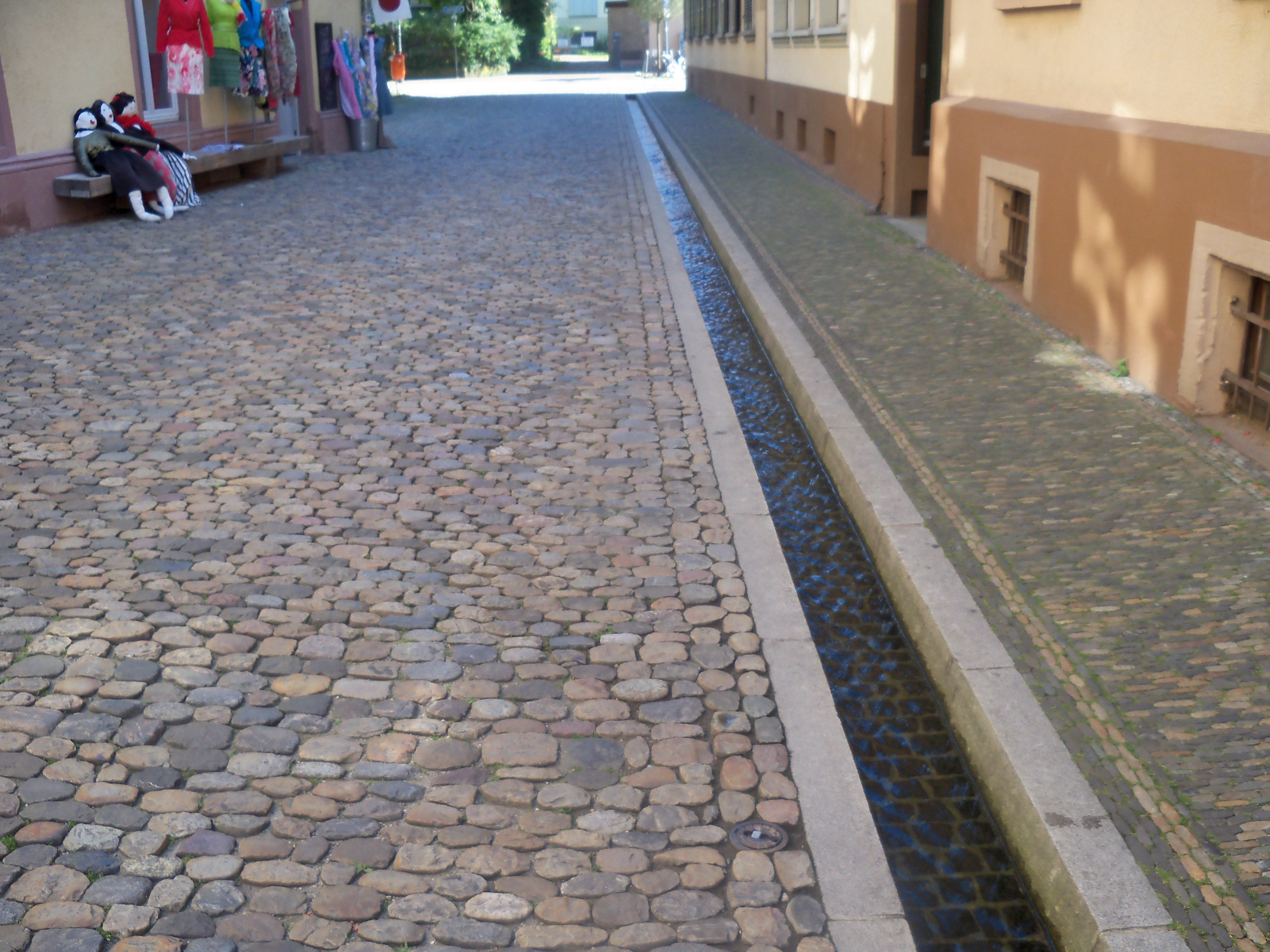
Artificial rills, known locally as Bächle, flank several streets in the old quarter of Freiburg, Germany.

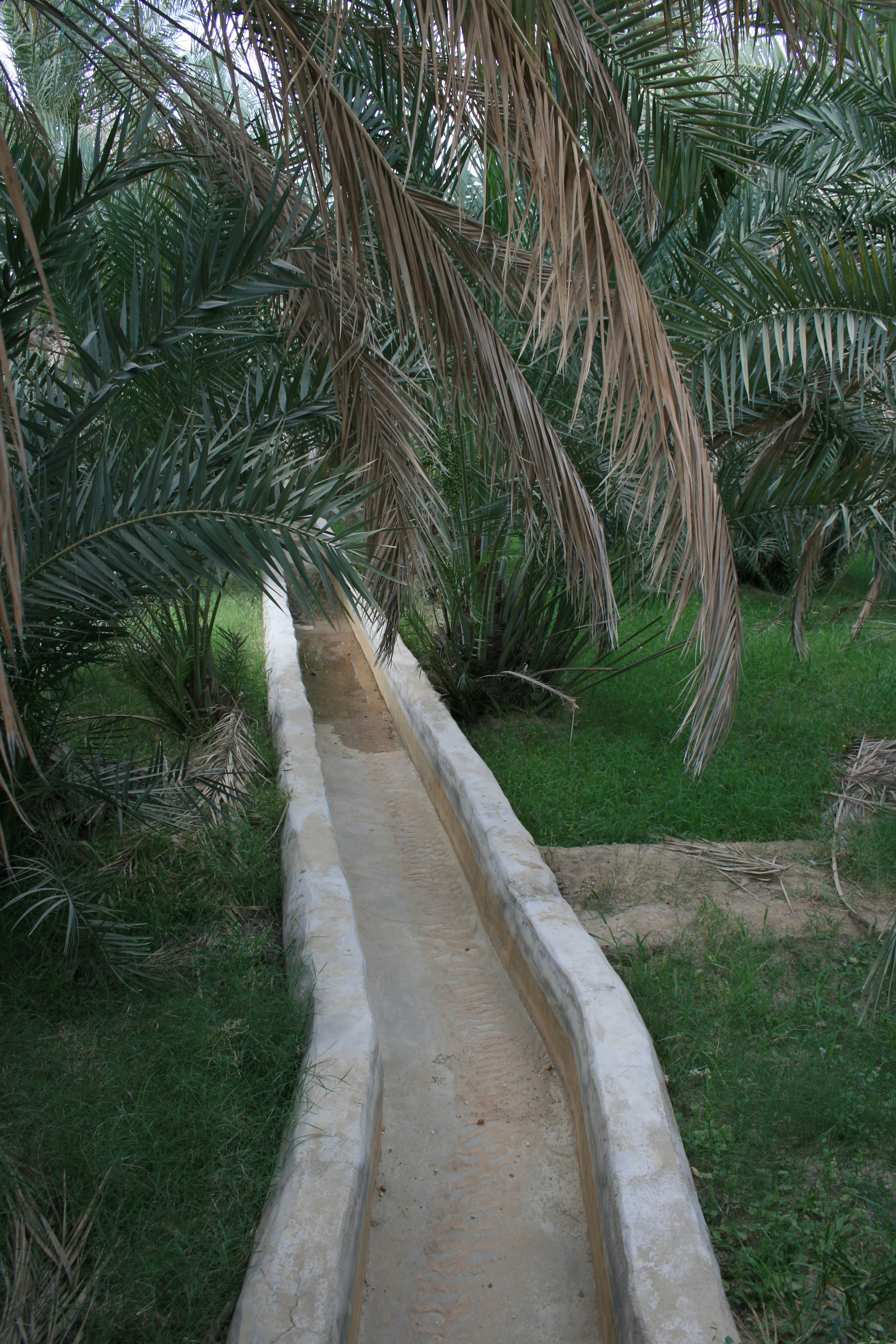
An artificial rill, part of the Falaj water transportation system, at Al Ain Oasis, in the Abu Dhabi Emirate.

A constructed functional rill is a small canal or aqueduct of stone, brick, concrete, or other lining material, usually rectilinear in cross section, for water transportation from a source such as a river, spring, reservoir, qanat, or aqueduct for domestic consumption or agricultural irrigation of crop land uses.

Rills were traditionally used in Middle Eastern and Mediterranean climate cultures of ancient and historical eras; and other climates and continents worldwide. They are distinguished from a 'water ditch' by being lined to reduce absorption losses and to increase durability. The Falaj irrigation system at the Al Ain Oasis, in present-day Abu Dhabi Emirate, uses rills as part of its qanat water system. Sometimes in the Spanish language they are called Acequias.

Rills are also used for aesthetic purposes in landscape design. Rills are used as narrow channels of water inset into the pavement of a garden, as linear water features, and often tiled and part of a fountain design.

The historical origins are from paradise garden religious images that first translated into ancient Persian Gardens. Rills were later exceptionally developed in the Moorish (Spanish) Gardens of Al-andalus, such as at the Alhambra in Granada; and also in other Islamic gardens, cultures, and countries. Early 20th century examples are in the María Luisa Park gardens in Seville, Spain; and at the Casa del Herrero gardens in Montecito, California.

=== Tunnels ===
Aqueducts sometimes run for some or all of their path through tunnels constructed underground. A version of this common in North Africa and Central Asia that has vertical wells at regular intervals is called a qanat. One historic example found in Syria, the Qanat Firaun, extends over 100 kilometers.

=== Pipes ===
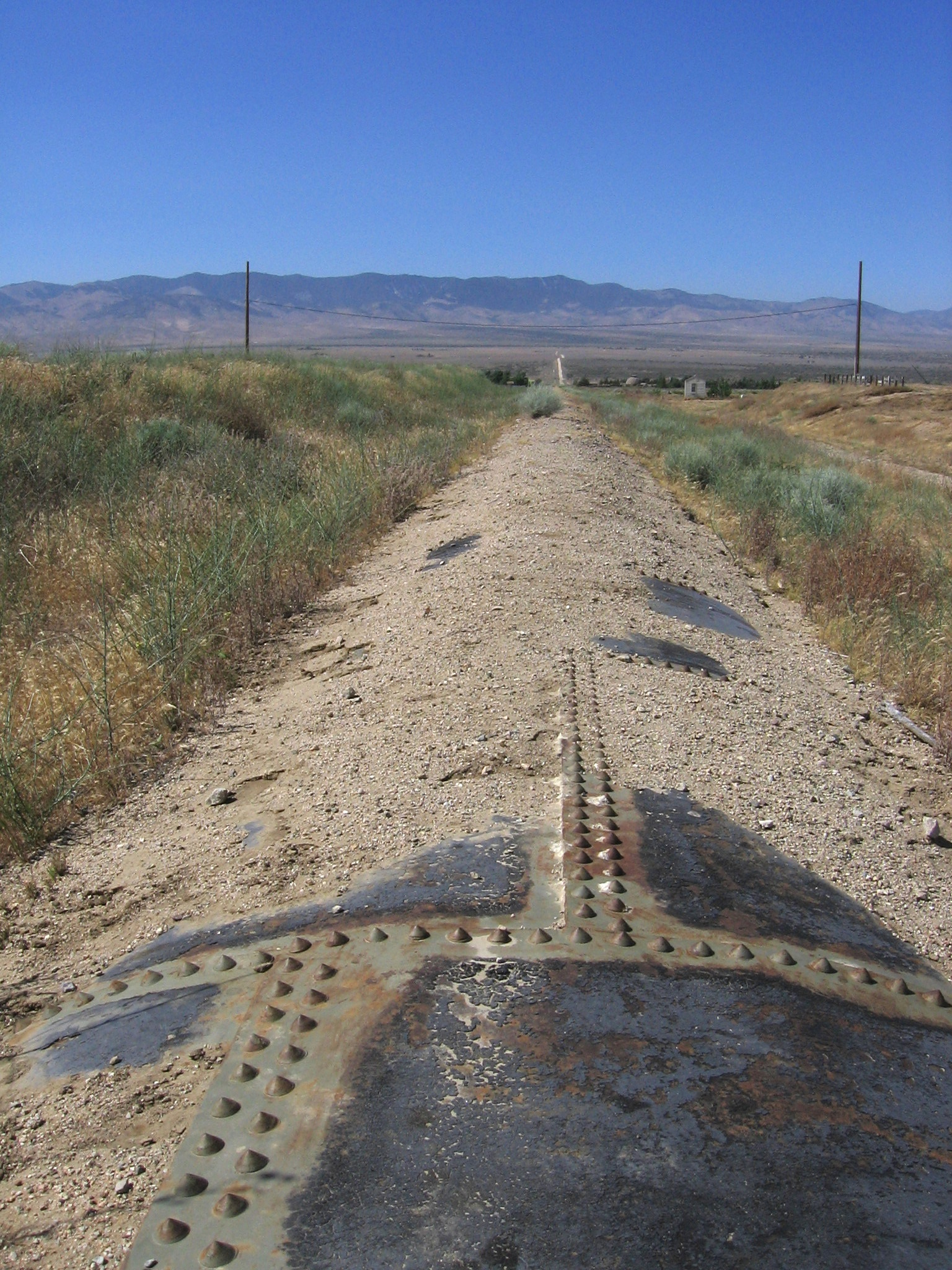
The Los Angeles Aqueduct

Modern aqueducts may also make extensive use of pipelines. Pipelines are useful for transporting water over long distances when it needs to move over hills, or where open channels are poor choices due to considerations of evaporation, freezing, pollution, or environmental impact. They can also be used to carry treated water.

== Uses ==
Historically, agricultural societies have constructed aqueducts to irrigate crops. Archimedes invented the water screw to raise water for use in irrigation of croplands.

Another use for aqueducts is to supply large cities with drinking water. They also help drought-prone areas with water supply. Some of the Roman aqueducts still supply water to Rome today. In California, United States, three large aqueducts supply water over hundreds of miles to the Los Angeles area. Two are from the Owens River area, and a third is from the Colorado River.

In modern civil engineering projects, detailed study and analysis of open-channel flow is commonly required to support flood control, irrigation systems, and large water supply systems when an aqueduct rather than a pipeline is the preferred solution.

In the past, aqueducts often had channels made of earth or other porous materials but significant amounts of water are lost through such unlined aqueducts. As water gets increasingly scarce, these canals are being lined with concrete, polymers, or impermeable soil. In some cases, a new aqueduct is built alongside the old one because it cannot be shut down during construction.

== See also ==
- Acequia
- Zanja
- Qanat
- Earthquake engineering
- Goldfields Water Supply Scheme
- Leat
- List of aqueducts
- List of canal aqueducts in the United Kingdom
- List of Roman aqueduct bridges
- Navigable aqueduct
- Pipeline – some used to carry water
- Roman architecture
- Roman engineering
- Sanitation in Ancient Rome
- Water resources
