= La Calera =

La Calera may refer to:

== Places ==
- Argentina
  - La Calera, Córdoba
  - La Calera, San Luis
  - La Calera, Tucumán
- Colombia
  - La Calera, Cundinamarca
- Chile
  - La Calera, Chile
  - La Calera (oasis), a small oasis and orchard in the Atacama Desert of Chile.
- Mexico
  - La Calera Airport
- Spain
  - La Calera, Cáceres, a village part of Alía municipality

== Sports ==
- Unión La Calera, Chilean football club

== See also ==
- Calera (disambiguation)
