= Pica Aquifer =

Coordinates: 20°28′13.49″S 69°18′45.07″W

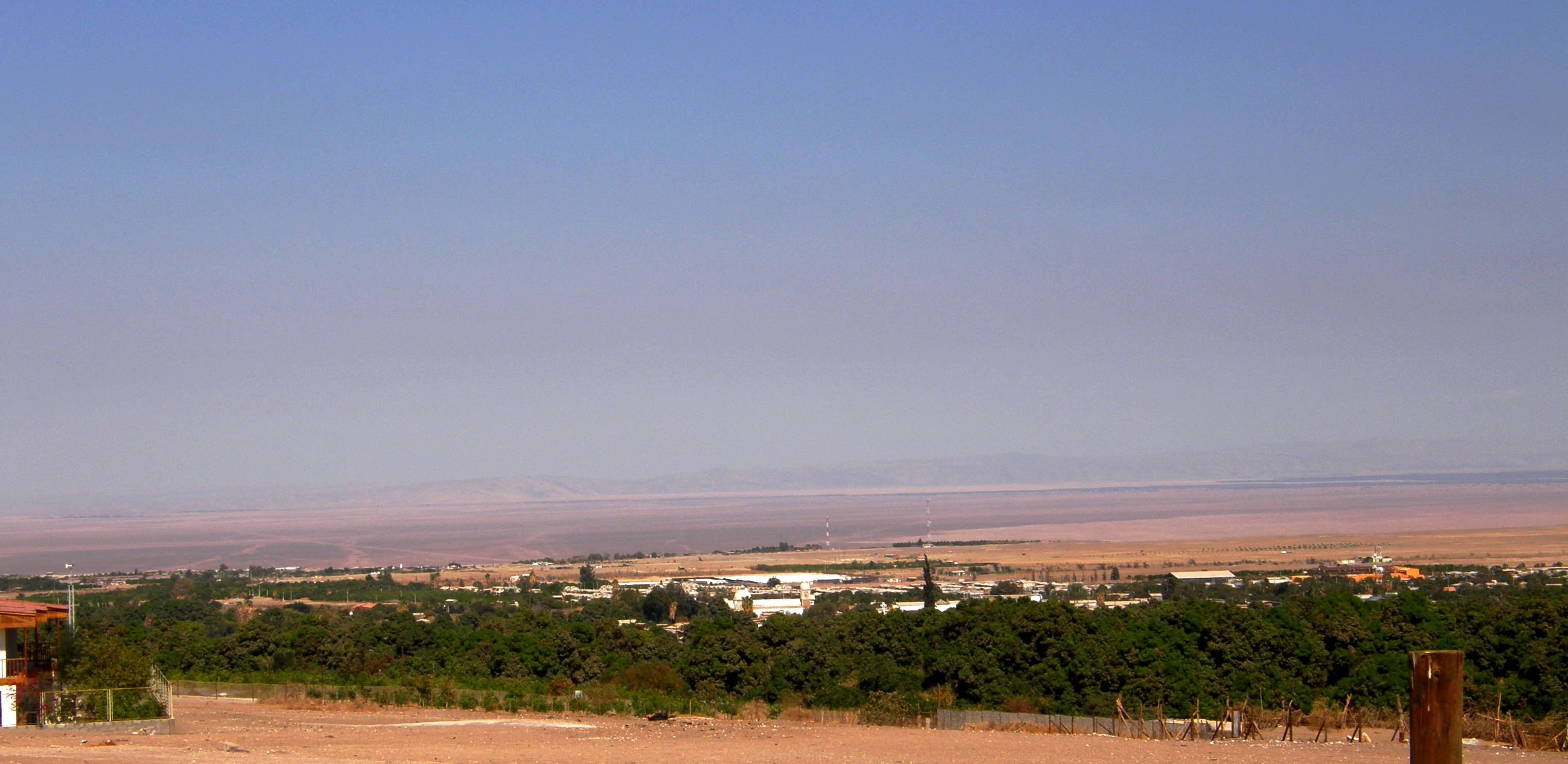
View of Pica town and oasis in the foreground from the southeast. In the background the flat land of Pampa del Tamarugal can be seen.

Pica Aquifer (Spanish: acuífero de Pica) located in Tarapacá Region of northern Chile is one of the most important aquifers of Atacama Desert. The water of the aquifer is tapped by a system of underground aqueducts known as puquios to irrigate the oases of Pica and Matilla. The uppermost part of the aquifer is within loosely consolidated alluvial and aeolian sediments deposited in the Quaternary period. The recharge zone of Pica Aquifer is estimated to lie between ~3,000 and 4,000 meters above sea level.

As nearby oasis Puquio de Núñez taps the Pampa del Tamarugal Aquifer it is thought that the hydraulic divide between the aquifers of Pampa del Tamarugal and Pica should be between Puquio de Núñez and Matilla. It is not known if the waters of Pica Aquifer flow into Pampa del Tamarugal Aquifer as these two aquifers are separated by the Longacho fault line. While this fault may deviate and block part of the flow a 2012 study showed a hydraulic gradient from Matilla to west suggesting that water from Pica Aquifer flow into Pampa del Tamarugal Aquifer.
