= Calera =

Calera may refer to:

== Places ==
- Calera, Alabama
- Calera, Oklahoma
- Calera, Chile
- Calera de Tango, Chile
- Calera de Víctor Rosales, Mexico
- Calera de León, Spain
- Calera y Chozas, Spain

== Other uses ==
- Calera, a synonym of the moth genus Peoria (moth)

== See also ==
- La Calera (disambiguation)
