= Cantalloc Aqueducts =

Archaeological site in Peru

Coordinates: 14°49′36″S 74°54′37″W

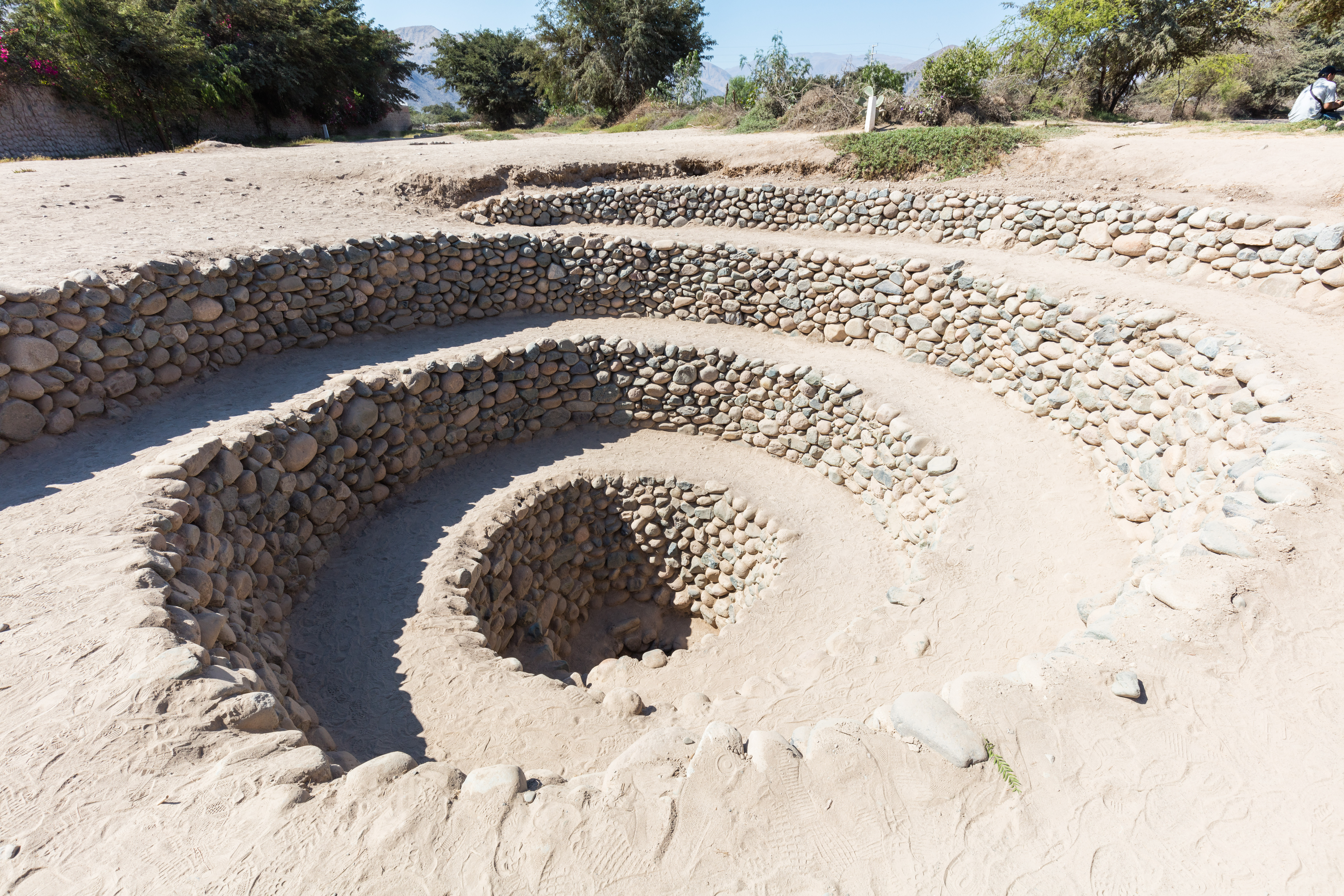
- Interactive map of Cantalloc Aqueducts

General information
- Type: Aqueduct
- Location: Ica, Peru

The Cantalloc Aqueducts are a series of aqueducts located 3 kilometres (1.9 miles) east of the city of Nazca, Peru, built by the Nazca culture. More than 40 aqueducts were built, which were used all year round. There are other aqueducts in different parts of the city.

They are part of a system of aqueducts of the same type called puquios that were built by the pre-Inca civilization of Nazca about 1,500 years ago. The holes in the ground are designed to allow access to the subterranean aquaduct for construction and maintenance.

The aqueducts ensured the supply of water to the city of Nazca and the surrounding fields, allowing the cultivation of cotton, beans, potatoes, and other crops in an arid region.

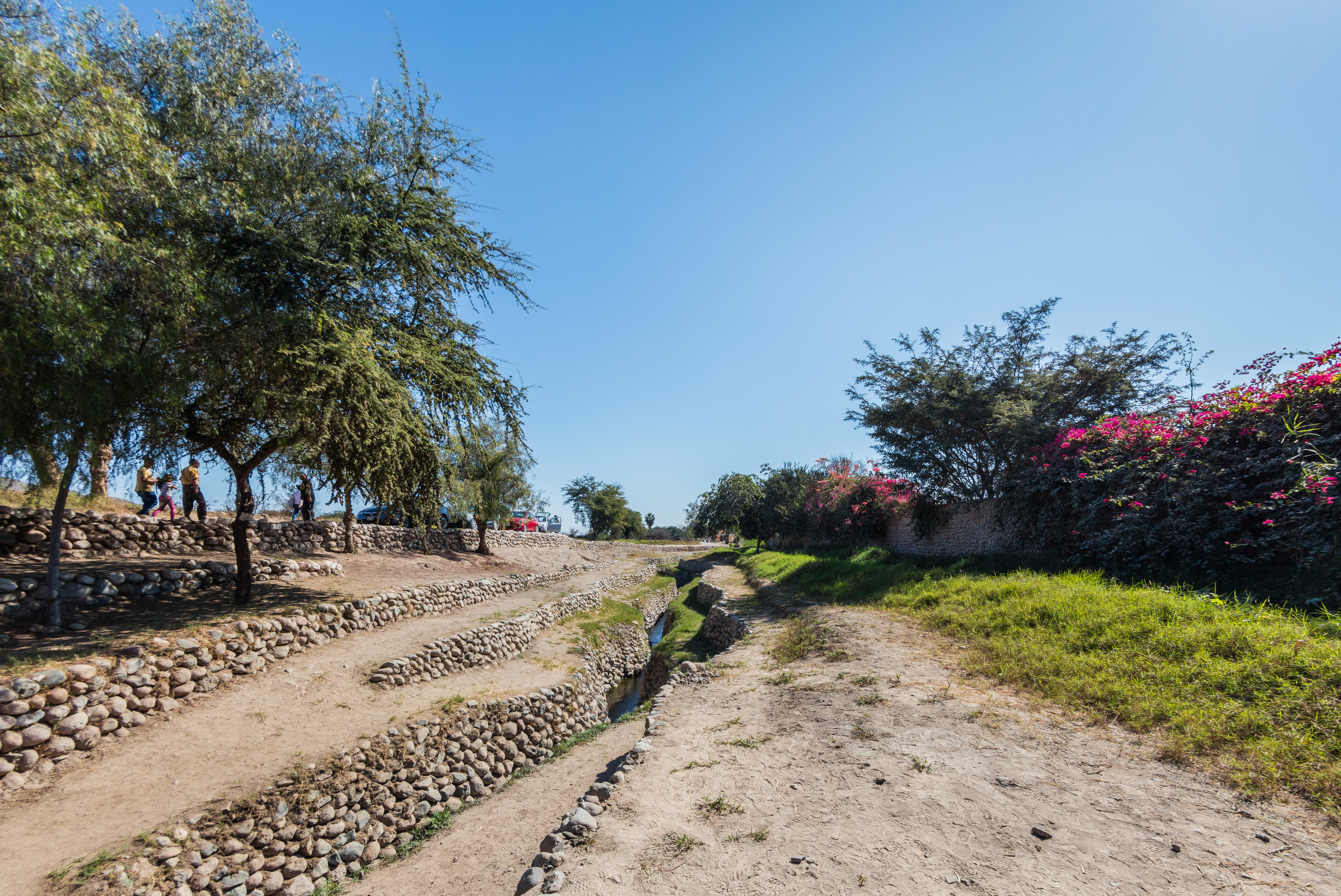

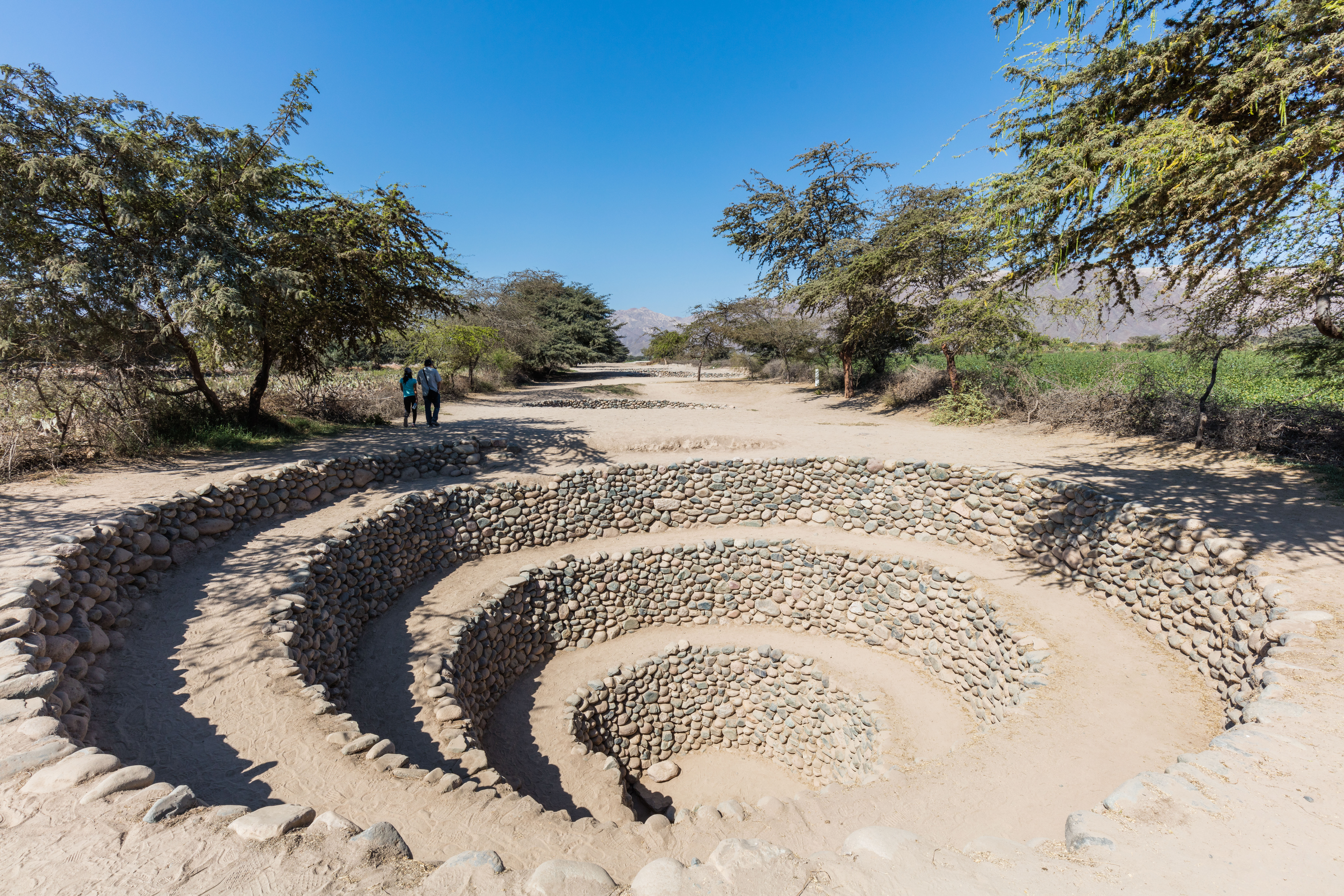

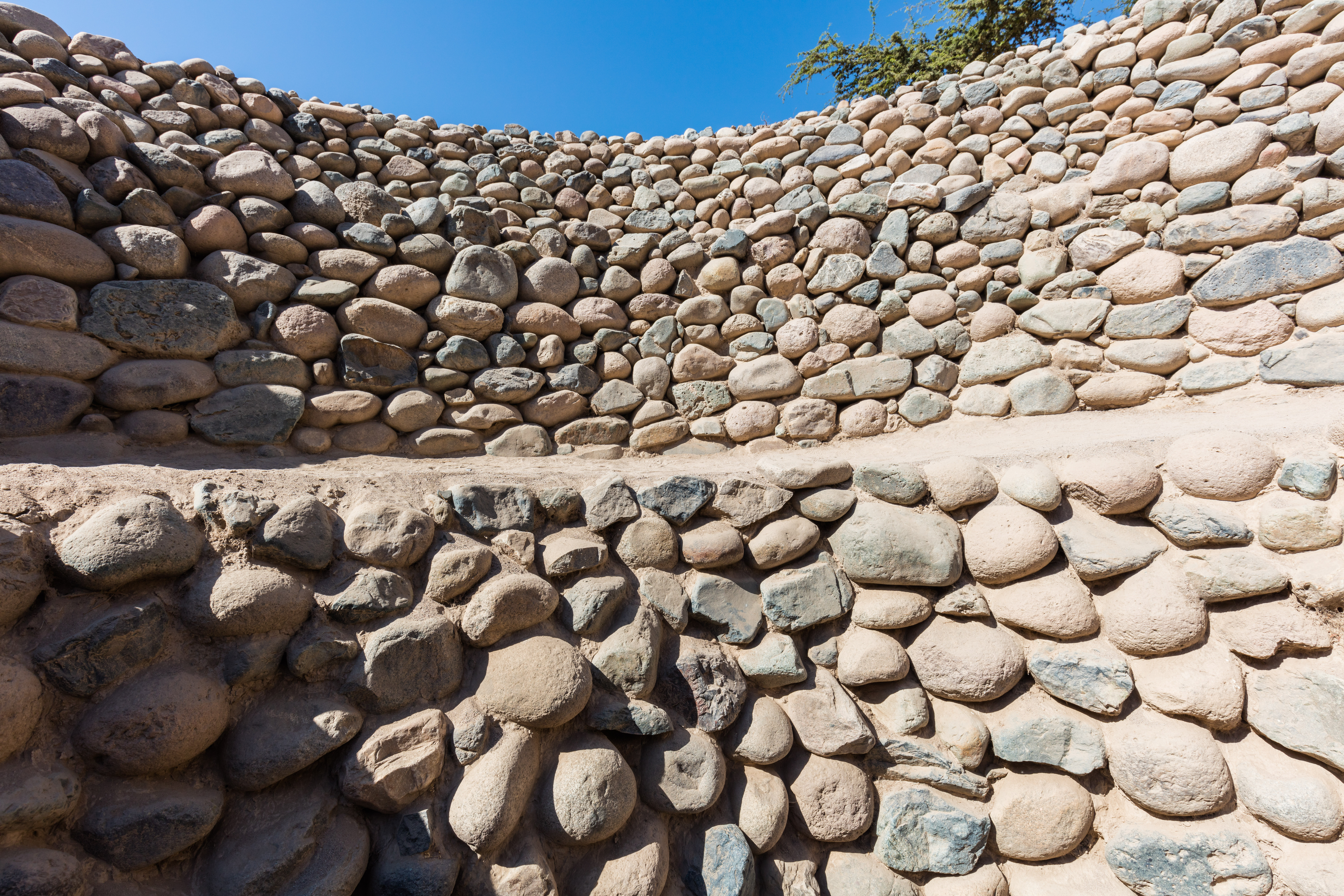

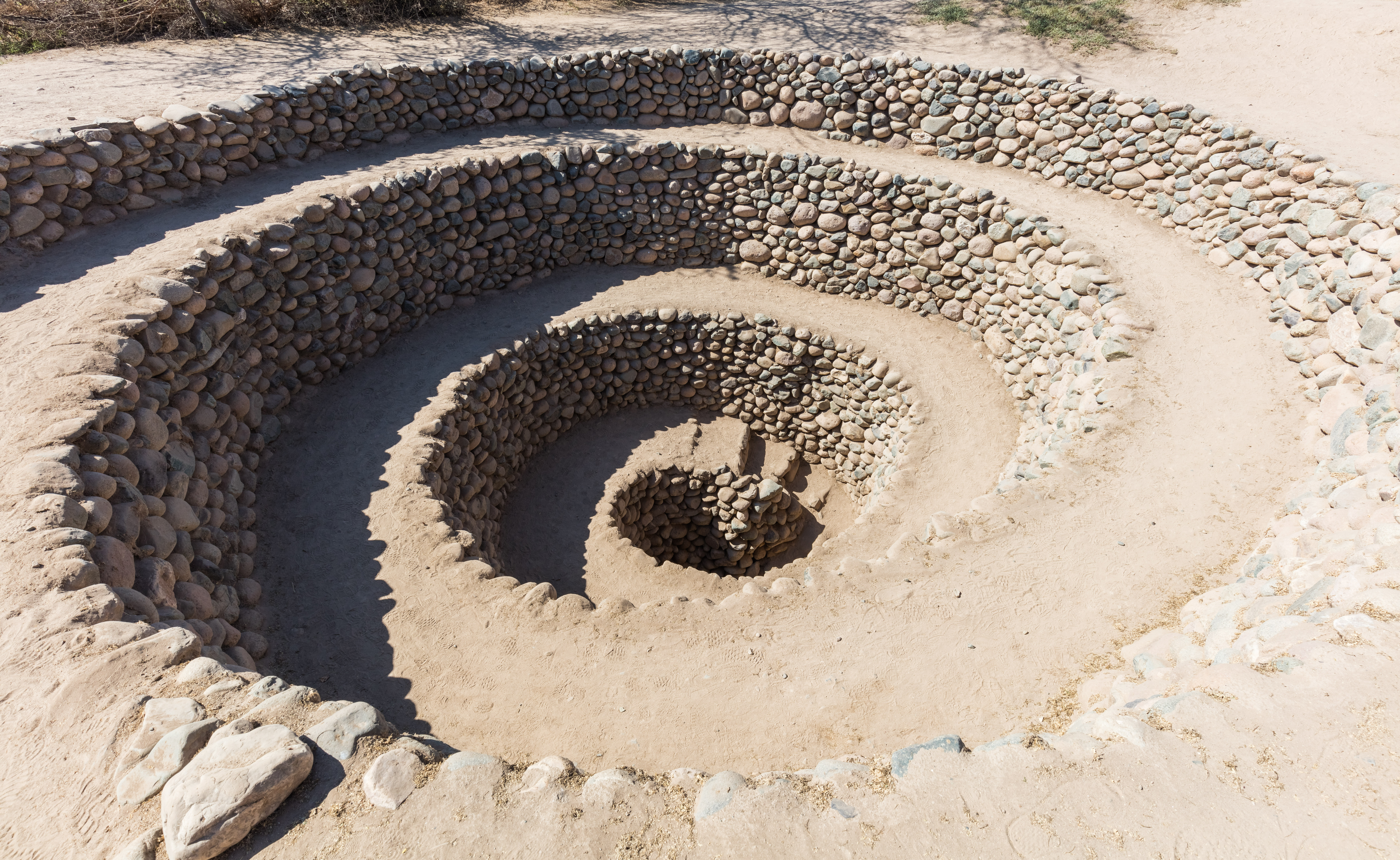

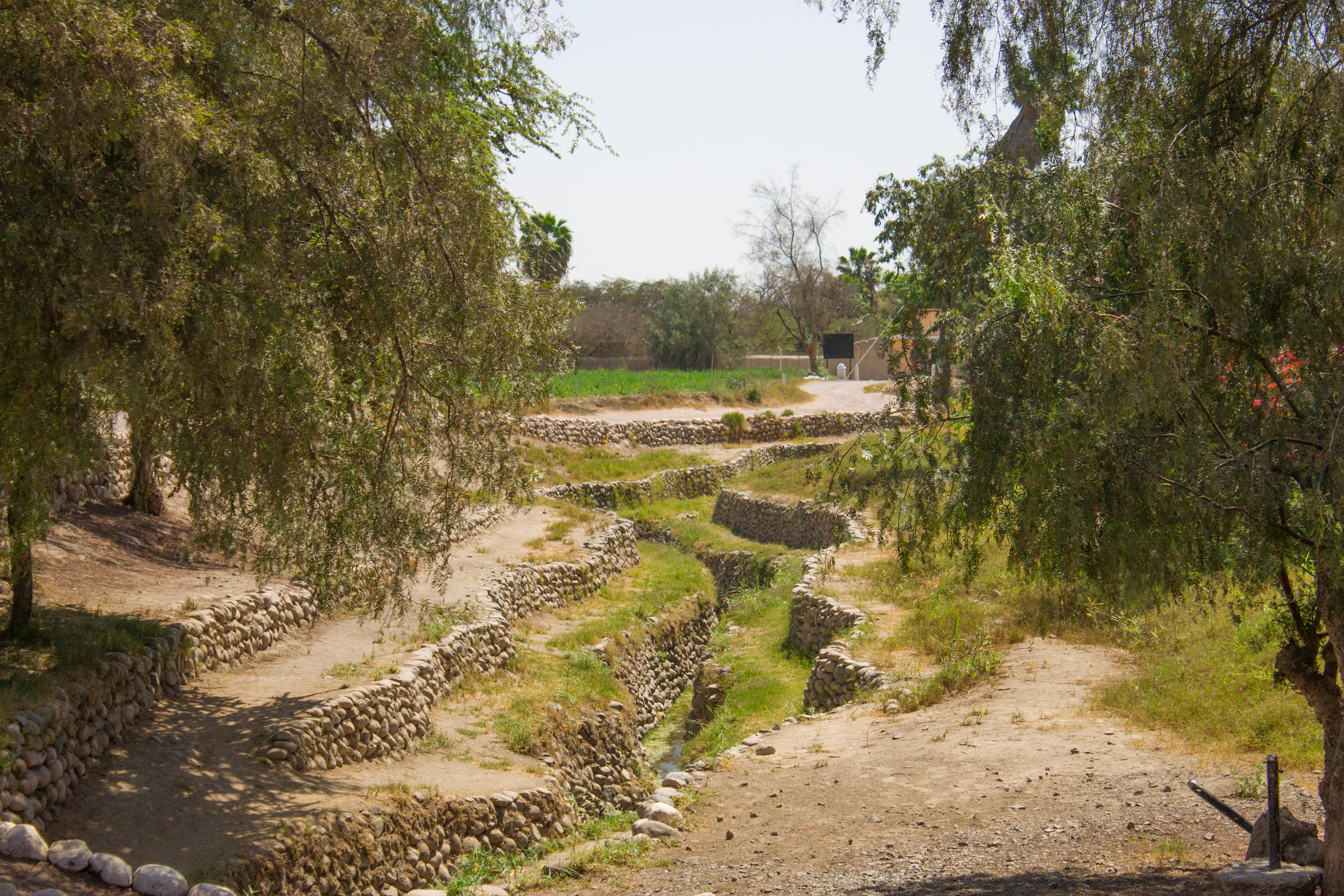

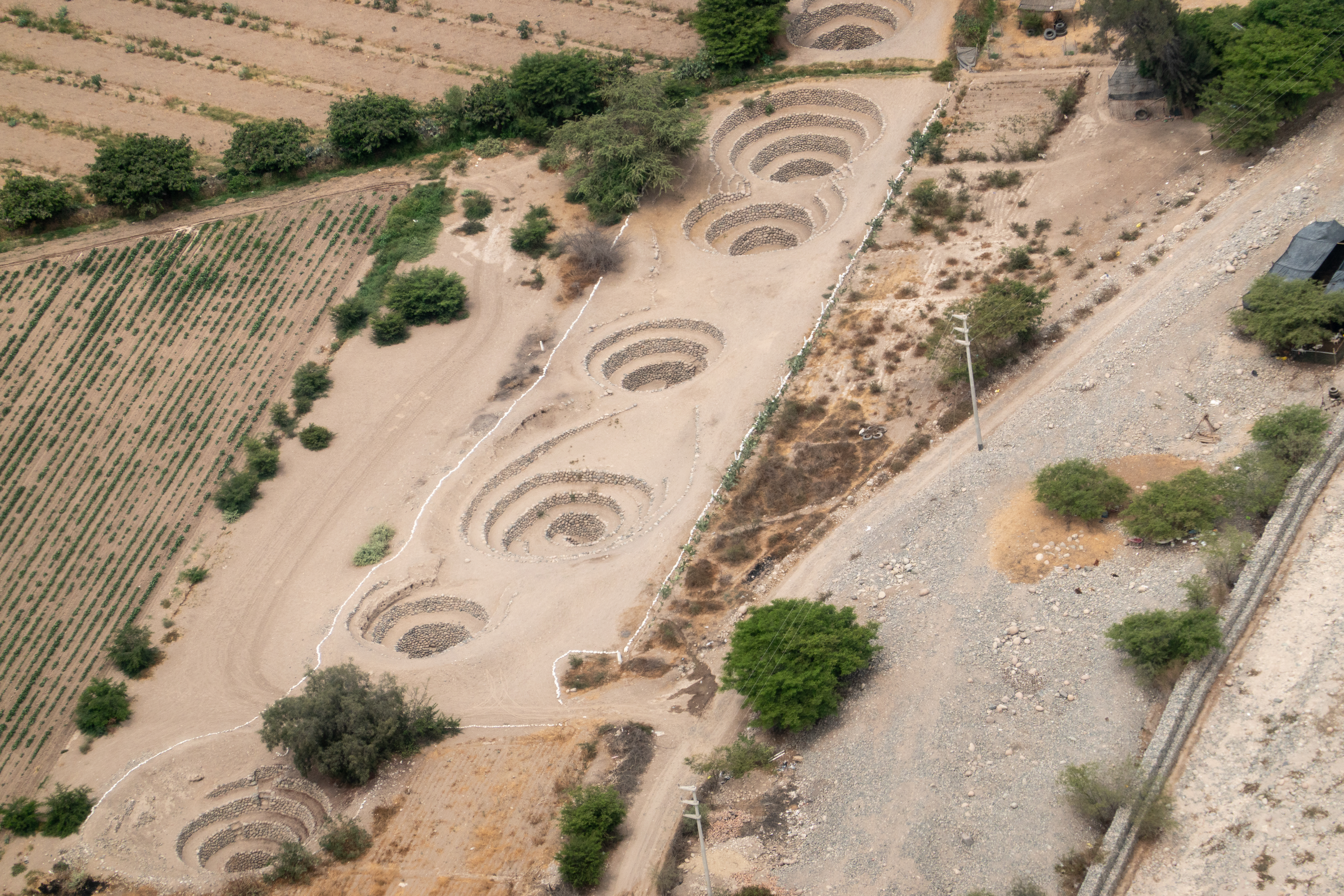
