= Puquios =

Underground aqueducts in Peru and Chile

- Filtration Galleries
- Location within Peru
- 14.826°S 74.911°W
- Type: irrigation system
- Location: Nazca, Ica Region, Peru

History
- Built: c. 500 CE
- Abandoned: Still in use

The technology of the Qanats of Iran is similar to that used for the puquios of Peru.

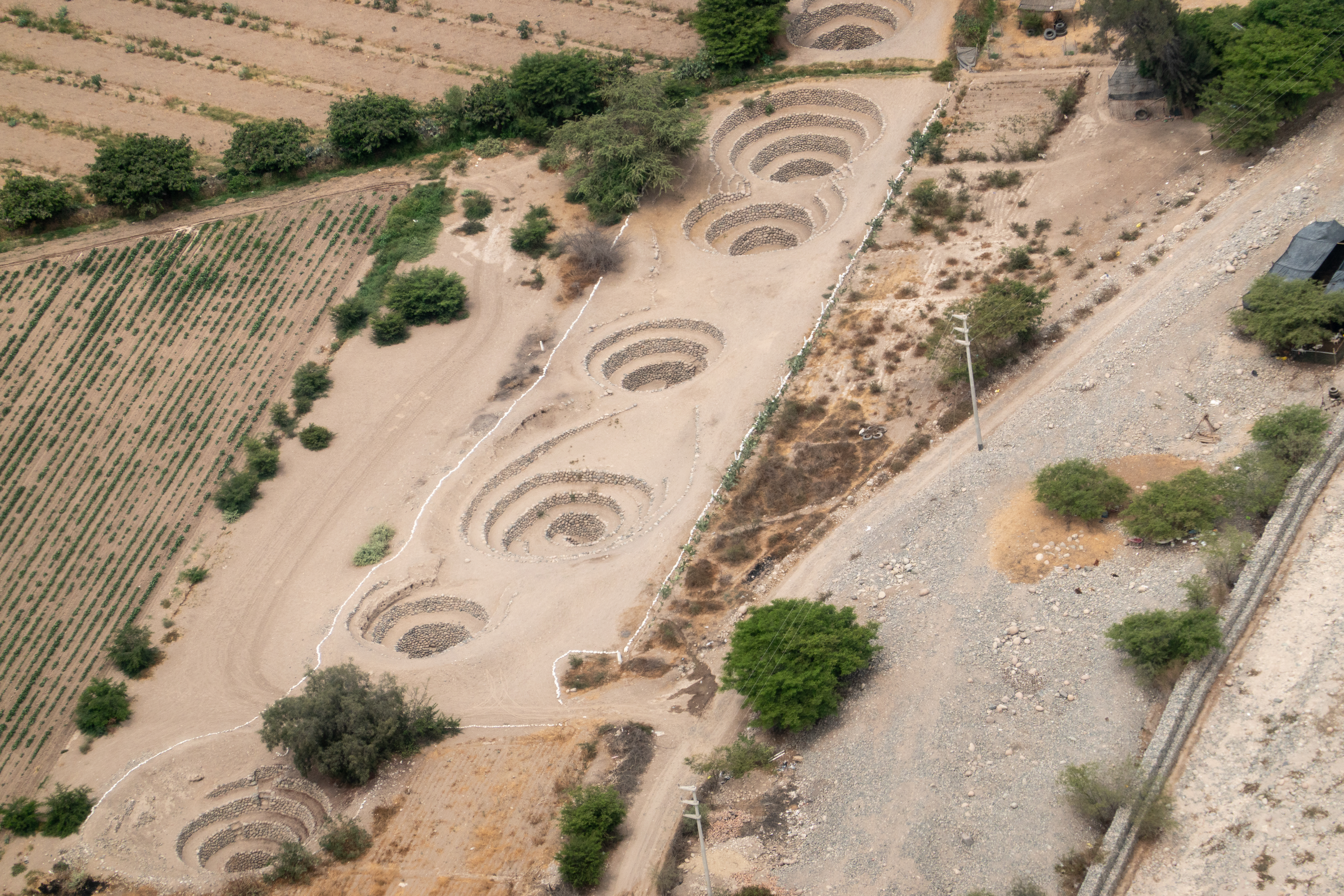
The Cantalloc puquios near Nazca, Peru. The cork-screwing funnels are for access to the underground aqueduct.

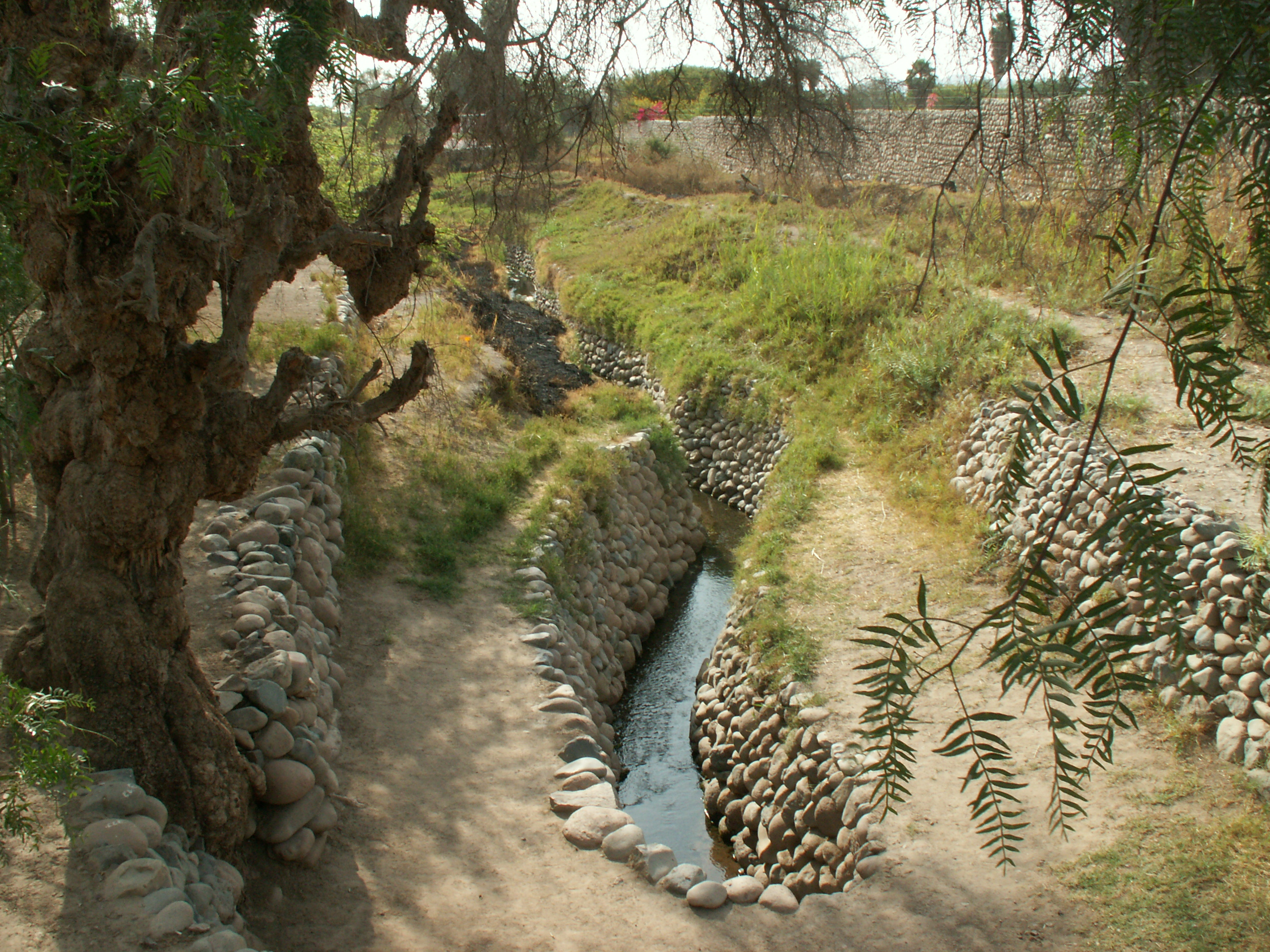
An aqueduct emerges from an underground or gallery puquios into a trench which supplies water for irrigation and domestic uses.

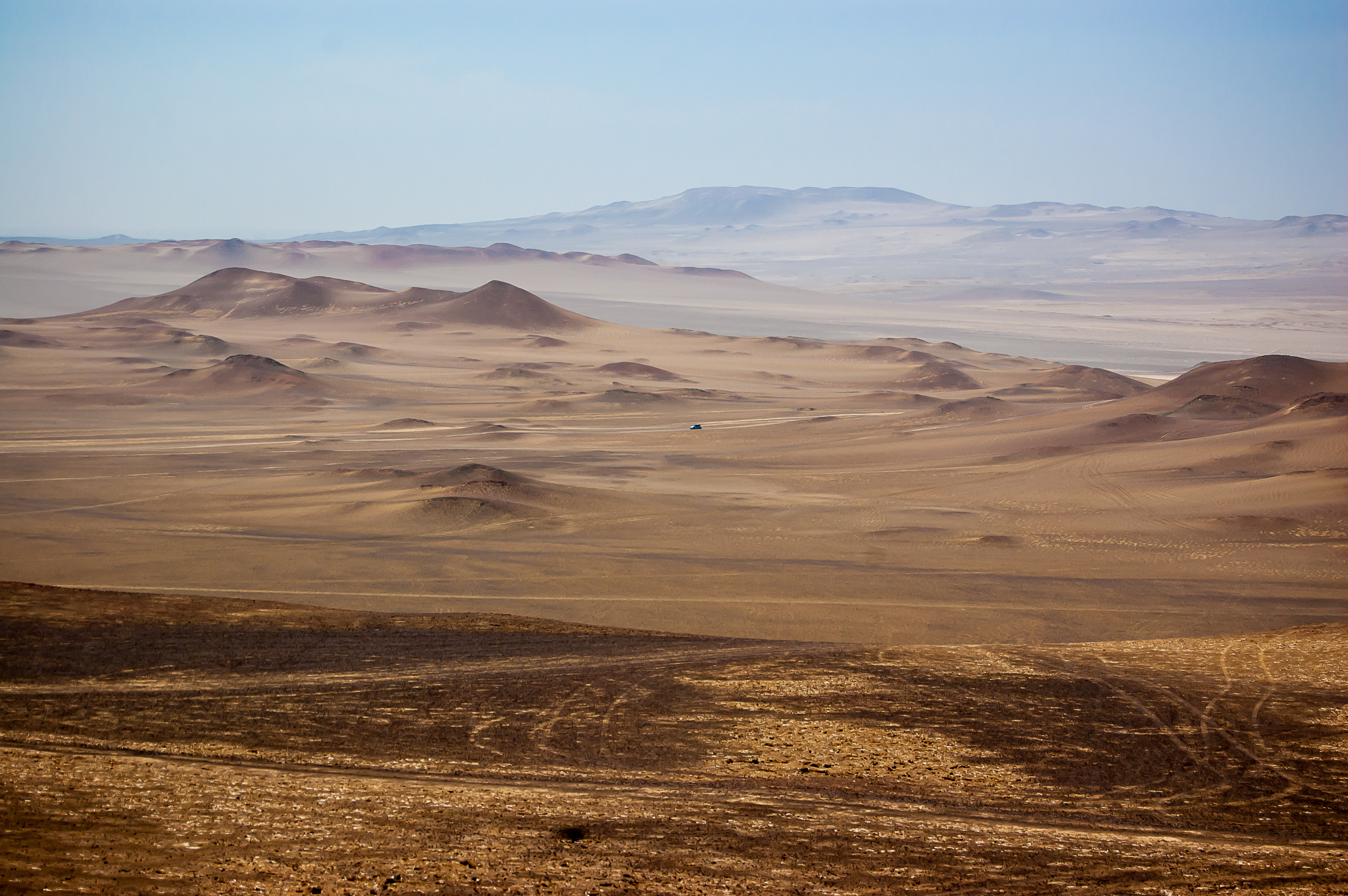
Except for river valleys where irrigation is possible, the desert of the Nazca Region is barren. The Pan American Highway is in the distance.

Puquios (from Quechua pukyu meaning source, spring, or water well) are ancient systems of subterranean aqueducts which allow water to be transported over long distances in hot dry climates without loss of much of the water to evaporation. Puquios are found in the coastal deserts of southern Peru, especially in the Nazca region, and northern Chile. Forty-three puquios in the Nazca region were still in use in the early 21st century and relied upon to bring fresh water for irrigation and domestic use into desert settlements. The origin and dating of the Nazca puquios is disputed, although some archaeologists have estimated that their construction began about 500 CE by indigenous people of the Nazca culture.

The technology of the puquios is similar to that of the Qanats of Iran and other desert areas of Asia and Europe, including Spain. A few puquios in northern Chile and in other parts of Peru were probably constructed at the initiative of the Spanish after the conquest of the Inca Empire in the 16th century.

== Origins ==
=== Chile ===
The puquios first became a subject of study in the early 20th century. Although they had been known before, historic evidence was scarce. Around 1900 scholars noted that puquios, locally known as socavones (lit. shafts), were spread through the oases of Atacama Desert. In the 21st century, puquios, in various states of use and decay, still exist in the valleys of Azapa and Sibaya and the oases of La Calera, Pica-Matilla and Puquio de Núñez. In 1918 geologist Juan Brüggen mentioned the existence of 23 socavones (shafts) in the Pica oasis, yet these have since been abandoned due to economic and social changes. The puquios of Pica-Matilla and Puquio Núñez tap the Pica Aquifer.

=== Nazca puquios in Peru ===
The puquios of the Nazca (or Nasca) region are of most interest to archaeologists as the area was the center of pre-Columbian civilizations such as Nazca culture which flourished from 100 BCE to 800 CE. Most archaeologists believe that the Nazca puquios are of pre-Columbian origin, but some believe that they were built by the indigenous subjects of the Spanish colonists in the 16th century. The theory of a Spanish origin holds that the puquios technology is not substantially different from Spanish techniques used from the early conquest to drain mines. An early example is the mine of Potosí that was drained by subterranean canals as early as 1556 following instructions of Florentine engineer Nicolás de Benito. Another argument for the Hispanic origin of puquios is that a Spanish law in Peru decreed that water from pre-Hispanic waterworks must be shared among landowners while the water from Hispanic waterworks could be owned by a single landowner. In an 18th-century legal case, a judge ruled in favor of the Hispanic origin of the puquios in the Chancay valley.

Proponents for the pre-Hispanic origin of the Nazca puquios cite the establishment of large settlements in river valleys with puquios in the 6th century CE, an indication that the settlement was stimulated by the water supplied by the puquios. They interpret Nazca culture iconography as portraying puquios symbolically. Climatic change may also have been a factor as the region entered several centuries of extreme aridity after about 400 CE which required the construction of irrigation works, presumably puquios, to provide water for domestic use and irrigation. The first known historical writing to refer to puquios in Nazca was in 1605 by the Spanish cleric Reginaldo de Lizárraga. Lizárraga mentions that the "indios" (indigenous peoples) of the region made use of the puquios but does not specifically attribute their construction to either the Spanish or the indigenous people. He also mentioned the much-diminished population of the indigenous people, their numbers a fraction of their pre-Columbian population due mostly to epidemics of European diseases.

In the early 21st century Rosa Lasaponara, Nicola Masini, and their team of the Italian CNR (National Research Council), in cooperation with archaeologist Giuseppe Orefici, studied the Nazca puquios using satellite imaging. They found evidence that the puquios system was once much more extensive. Scholars were able to see how the "puquios were distributed across the Nazca region, and where they ran in relation to nearby settlements – which are easier to date." Satellite imagery also revealed additional, previously unknown puquios in the Nazca drainage basin. The team that conducted this study concluded that the puquios are pre-Hispanic. In addition, RPAS (Remotely Piloted Aircraft Systems), or drones, were used in 2016 to map and document five sample aqueduct systems in the Nazca region.

A scientific method to precisely date the puquios has not been found, but, despite doubts, the "general consensus in 2017 was that the Nazca puquios were of "pre-Hispanic, Middle Nasca [c. 500 CE] origin...with subsequent Spanish and Republican modifications." The pre-Columbian origin of the Nazca puquios does not contradict the likelihood that the origin of other puquios scattered sparsely around the Central and Southern Andes is Spanish.

The technology of the puquios is similar to that of the qanats of Iran and Makhmur, Iraq, and other ancient filtration galleries known in numerous societies in the Old World and China, which appear to have been developed independently. They are a sophisticated way to provide water from underground aquifers in arid regions.

== Description of Nazca puquios ==
The coasts of Peru and Northern Chile are exceptionally arid with agriculture only possible with irrigation. Precipitation is less than 25 millimetres (0.98 in) annually near the coast and increases only slowly at higher elevations in the inland Andes. Moreover, the Rio Grande de Nazca and its tributaries provide only sparse, seasonal water to the valleys on the Nazca region. In the past, precipitation was higher in some eras, possibly reaching an average of 200 millimetres (7.9 in) annually. The people of the Nazca culture may have built the puquios to adapt to a climatic transition from greater to lesser precipitation after 400 CE and enduring until about 1100 CE, followed by a wetter period which lasted until about 1450 CE at which time another drier era began that persisted into the 21st century. The Nazca culture flourished in the area from 200 BCE to 650 CE.

The Nazca puquios are found along five of the nine named feeder streams into the Rio Grande de Nazca. From south to north, the rivers with puquios are Las Trancas, Taruga, and the Nazca, which has two tributaries, the Tierras Blancas and the Aja. The sources of the rivers is in the Andes about 70 kilometres (43 miles) from the puquios. The puquios are equally distant from the Pacific Ocean at elevations of about 500 metres (1,600 ft). These small rivers are mostly dry except during the rainy season in the Andes from January to April, but have both underground and surface sections during the dry season. The inhabitants of the river valleys constructed the puquios as sources of water during the dry season.

As of the year 2000, 43 puquios were still functioning of which 29 were near the city of Nazca in the valley of the Nazca river and its tributaries. The best known of the puquios are the Cantalloc Aqueducts. The largest pre-Columbian ruin of a settlement in the Nazca valley is Cahuachi, about 18 kilometres (11 miles) downstream from Nazca and near the famous Nazca Lines. Cahuachi is located along a course of the river in which it runs on the surface and thus the settlement did not depend upon puquios as did the settlements a few kilometers upstream. Many more puquios were likely built in pre-historic times in several other river valleys of the Rio Grande de Nazca system. Deep wells have replaced the abandoned puquios.

Two types of puquios are in the Nazca region. The first is the trench puquios which is a deep, narrow ditch, usually less than one meter in width and lined with rocks, which is open to the air. The second type is the gallery or subterranean puquios which is tunneled beneath the earth to tap the water from an aquifer. The water-bearing aquifer is typically about 10 metres (33 ft) underground, although it can be much closer to the surface. From the aquifer, the water flows through an underground tunnel downslope, emerging at the surface into a trench puquios for distribution to irrigation canals and for drinking and domestic purposes. The underground tunnel is typically about one meter square, although some of the tunnels reinforced with wood beams or in modern times with cement, can be 2 metres (6.6 ft) in height. Spaced along the route of the gallery puquios are vertical shafts, "eyes" or "ojos" in Spanish, which extend from the surface to the subterranean tunnel. The "ojos" permit access to the tunnel for maintenance and repair. The funnel-shaped ojos are spaced from 10 metres (33 ft) to 30 metres (98 ft) apart. The length of the gallery (underground section) of the puquios ranges from a few meters to 372 metres (1,220 ft). The associated trench puquios may be as long as a kilometer.

== History ==
Fifty-seven small rivers along the 1,500 kilometres (930 miles) long desert coastline of Peru empty into the Pacific Ocean. The river valleys were cultivated by their pre-Columbian inhabitants by using irrigation, but most of the valleys had more dependable and greater surface water availability than the often-dry rivers of the Nazca region. Conversely, the agricultural society of the Nazca people flourished best where surface water was most scarce. The puquios were the technology that permitted a substantial population to exist in an intensely arid region.

The Spanish first exerted control and settled in the Nazca region in the late 16th century. Under Spanish rule the area was noted for viticulture and the production of pisco, a brandy. In 1853, the English traveler Clements Markham described the Nazca valley as "the most fertile and beautiful spot on the coast of Peru." He described the puquios and said that "the fertility is due to the skill and industry of the ancient inhabitants. Under their care an arid wilderness was converted into a smiling paradise."

In the 21st century many of the puquios are still in use but their use is threatened by industrial agriculture and production of exportable crops such as asparagus. Deep wells have replaced some of the puquios as a source of water and the number of local people with the expertise to maintain the puquios has diminished. The modest amounts of water supplied by the puquios is replenished every year by precipitation at the source of the rivers in the Andes, but the exploitation by deep wells of underground water sources for agriculture and a growing population may not be sustainable.

== Bibliography ==
- Barnes M., "Dating of Nazca aqueducts," Nature 359, 111 (10 September 1992); doi:10.1038/359111a0
- Barnes, Monica and David Fleming (1991), "Filtration-gallery irrigation in the Spanish New World", Latin American Antiquity, Vol. 2, No. 1, pp. 48–68.
- Clarkson P., Dorn R. (1995) Archaeology: "New Chronometric Dates for the Puquios of Nasca, Peru", Latin American Antiquity, Vol. 6, No. 1, pp. 56–69 doi:10.2307/971600
- Lasaponara R., Masini N. (2012), "Following the Ancient Nasca Puquios from Space", In: Lasaponara R., Masini N. (Eds) 2012, Satellite Remote Sensing: a new tool for Archaeology, Springer, Verlag Berlin Heidelberg, ISBN 978-90-481-8800-0, pp. 269–290, doi:10.1007/978-90-481-8801-7_12
- Ponce-Vega, Luis A. (2015). "Puquios, qanats y manantiales: gestión del agua en el Perú antiguo" (PDF). Agricultura Sociedad y Desarrollo. 12 (3): 279–296. doi:10.22231/asyd.v12i3.240.
- Proulx, Donald A. Rickenbach, Judith (ed.). "Nasca Puquios and Aqueducts" (PDF). University of Massachusetts.
- Schreiber, Katharina J. and Josue Lancho Rojas (1988,) "Los pukios de Nasca: un sistema de galerias filtrantes.", Boletin e Lima, No. 59: 51-62.
- Schreiber K. H., Lancho Rojas J. (2003) Irrigation and Society in the Peruvian Desert: The Puquios of Nasca. Lexington Books, Lanham, Maryland ISBN 9780739106419
