= Huantajaya =

Silver mine in Chile

San Agustín de Huantajaya
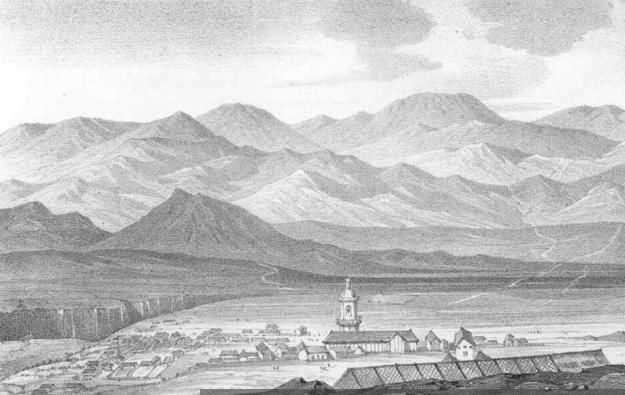
- Huantajaya in 1851, by William Bollaert

- Location within Chile
- Location: Tarapacá Region, Chile; 20°11′45.31″S 70°00′55.42″W
- Products: Silver

Huantajaya or San Agustín de Huantajaya was a silver mine in Chile in the Tarapacá area of Atacama Desert east of Iquique. The silver riches of Tarapacá were known to the Spanish since the time of the conquest of the Inca Empire. Pedro Pizarro mentions Tarapacá as region with silver in his 1571 book Relación del descubrimiento y conquista de los reinos del Perú. The main period of activity was in the 18th century. During this time the nearby oasis town of Pica prospered as a supply center.

In the 18th century the richest area of Huantajaya was known as Criadero and tuberous aggregates of silver dug there were known as papas (lit. potatoes). One of the largest such papas, weighing 800 pounds, was unearthed in 1729 and sent as gift to the King of Spain. The geology of the silver deposit at Huatajaya was recognised by contemporary mining businessman Bartolomé Loayza y Valdés as "not of the same caste as the other minerals [deposits] of the Kingdom". This geological complexity made the output of the mine highly unpredictable. Irregular supplies of mercury from Spain, required for the recovery of the silver, was another difficulty 18th century miners in Huantajaya had to deal with.

Spanish authorities regulated mining compelling miners to register their production in the Royal Treasury of Carangas in the Altiplano. From 1767 onwards miners were allowed to register their production in Lima and Potosí. In 1780 the Caja Real de Arica was opened in the city of Tacna giving miners the possibility of registering their production at a much closer locality.
