= La Calera (oasis) =

Oasis in Atacama Desert

Coordinates: 20°21′49.32″S 69°23′36.64″W

La Calera is a small oasis and orchard in the Atacama Desert of Chile. The oasis is irrigated by an underground canal, a puquio tapping an aquifer. Located at 1,390 meters above sea level (m asl.) La Calera lies about 15 kilometers north of the larger oasis of Pica.

A map of Tarapacá published in 1765 by Antonio O'Brien show two small houses and cultivated field in La Calera. O'Brien describes it as the site of a small hacienda (azenduela) noting that alfalfa, figs, pumpkins and water melons were cultivated in the oasis. La Calera had twelve inhabitants by 1883 and was considered an important stopover in the route to Bolivia, given its "abundant grass and water". It was also considered a shorter route than its alternatives. The results of the survey of Risopatrón published in 1924 does also mention it as an hacienda (Hacienda de La Calera), albeit it is not clear if this imply some similarity with the haciendas of Central Chile.
