= Matilla =

- Town
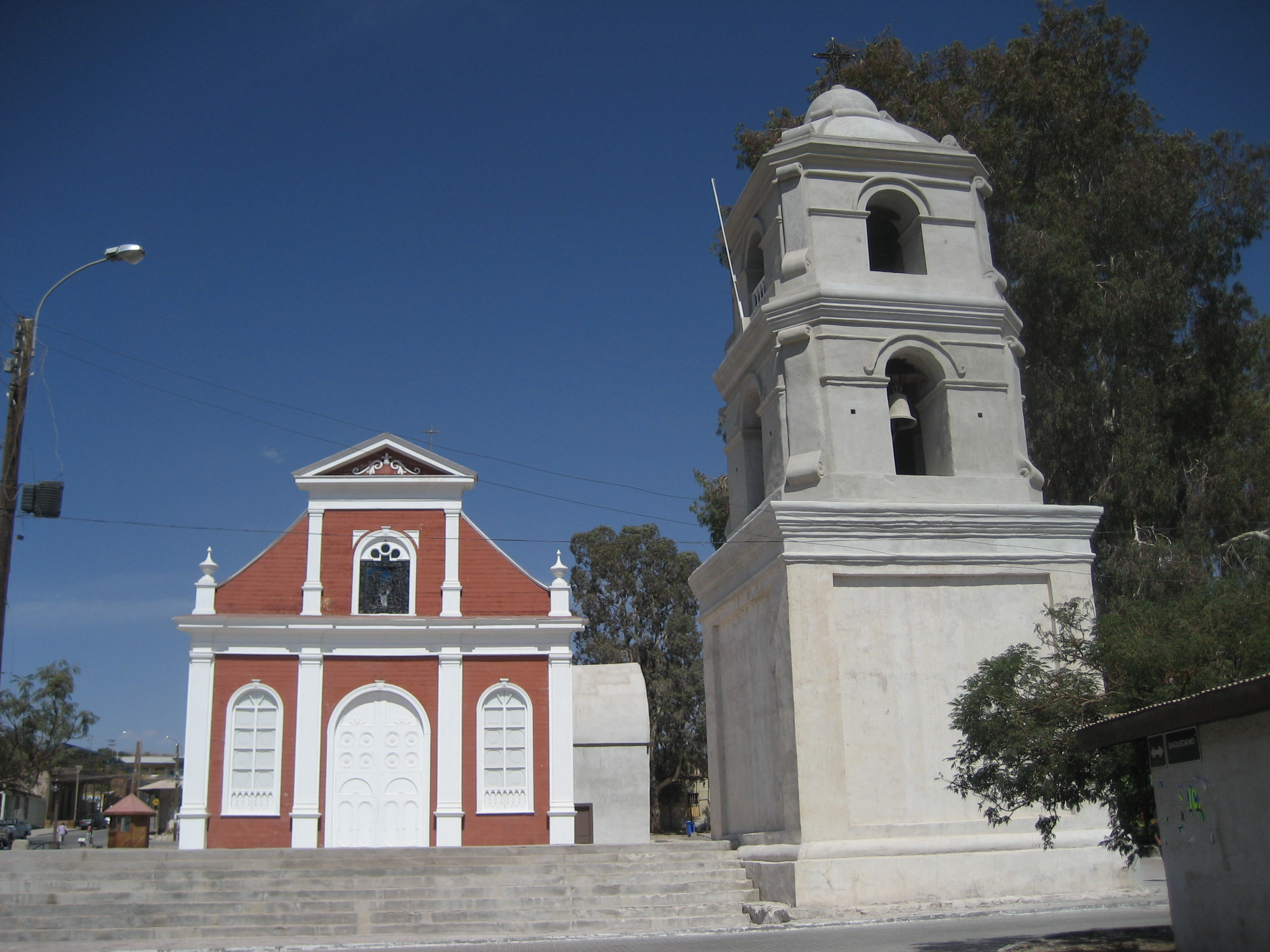
- Church of Matilla

- Map of the commune of Pica in Tarapacá Region Location in Chile
- Coordinates: 20°30′48.5″S 69°21′40.6″W
- Country: Chile
- Region: Tarapacá
- Province: Tamarugal

Government
  - Type: Municipal council
- Elevation: 1,206 m (3,957 ft)

Population (2017 Census)
  - Total: 380

Sex
  - Men: 181
  - Women: 199
- Time zone: UTC-4 (CLT)
  - Summer (DST): UTC-3 (CLST)
- Area code: (+56) 5

Matilla is a Chilean village and oasis in the interior of Atacama Desert. It lies four kilometers southwest of the oasis town of Pica. As of 2017 Matilla had 380 inhabitants and 217 homes. It hosts underground aqueducts in various states of decay. These aqueducts are locally known as socavones and tap Pica Aquifer.

In the late 19th century its inhabitants were prone to suffer typhus, ostensibly because of the poor quality of the village's water source and the existence of a nearby swamp. In 1904 the village had obtained a new water supply thanks to Father Luis Friedrich's initiative and the wealthy neighbors who financed the works.

The population of Matilla is mostly of Spanish descent in contrast to Pica whose old inhabitants have more indigenous heritage.

The location became first known to the Spanish after the men of Diego de Almagro reached the area in 1536 on their return to Peru. Local lore says the town was founded in 1547 by Márquez de Loayza who arrived from present-day Bolivia. Other sources give 1642 as the date of founding.
