= Pica, Chile =

Chilean oasis and town in Atacama Desert

Pica
- Town and Commune
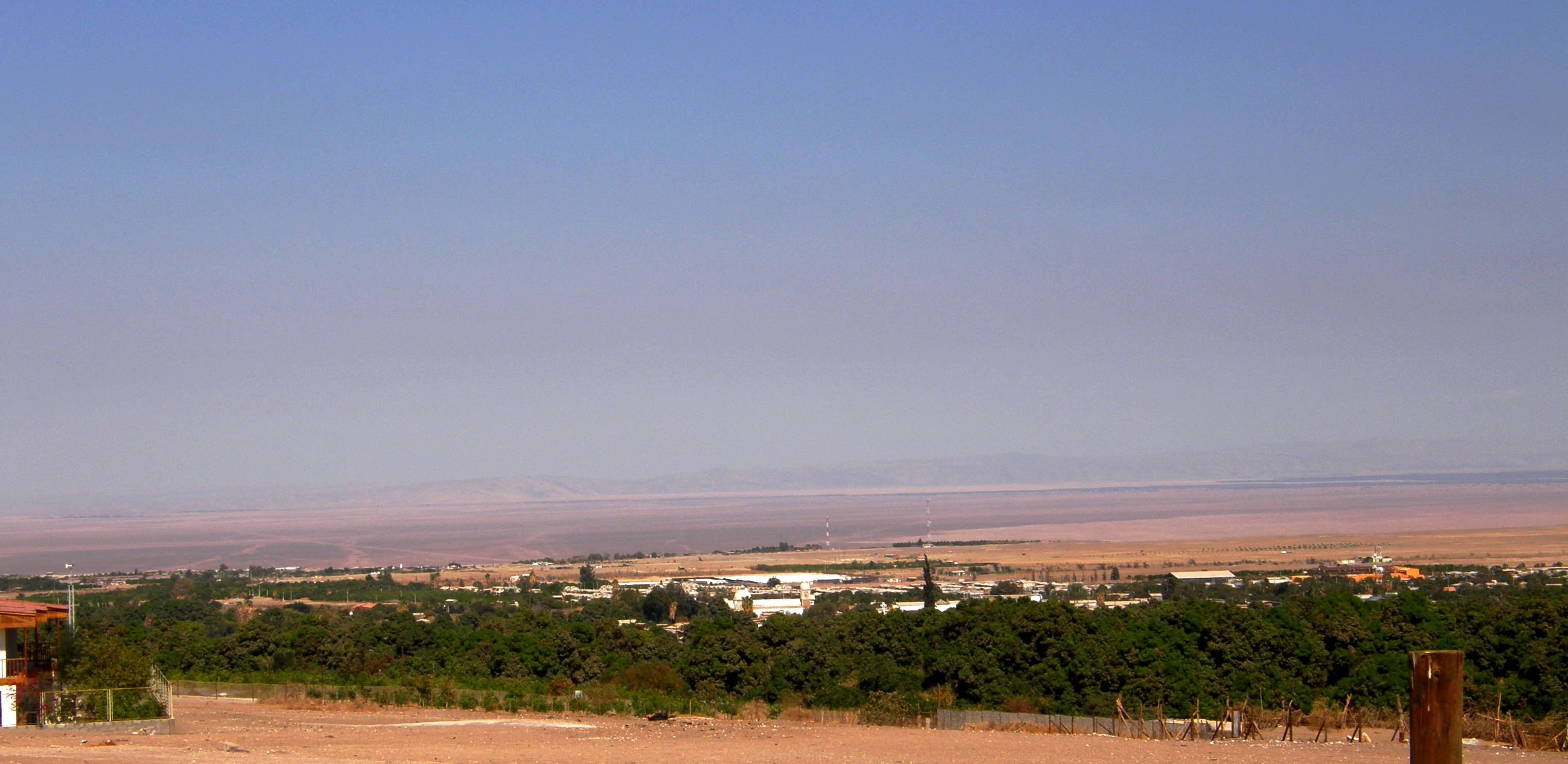
- View of Pica town and oasis in the foreground from the southeast.

- Coat of arms Map of Pica in Tarapacá Region Location in Chile
- Coordinates: 20°29′21″S 69°19′46″W
- Country: Chile
- Region: Tarapacá
- Province: Tamarugal

Government
  - Type: Municipal council
  - Alcalde: Iván Infante

Area
  - Total: 8,934.3 km^{2} (3,449.6 sq mi)
- Elevation: 1,106 m (3,629 ft)

Population (2017 Census)
  - Total: 9,296
  - Density: 1.040/km^{2} (2.695/sq mi)
  - Urban: 3,912
  - Rural: 5,384

Sex
  - Men: 6,550
  - Women: 2,746
- Time zone: UTC-4 (CLT)
  - Summer (DST): UTC-3 (CLST)
- Area code: (+56) 5
- Website: www.municipalidadpica.cl

Pica is a Chilean town and commune in Tamarugal Province, Tarapacá Region. Situated in the inland of the Atacama Desert on an oasis, Pica is famous for its small and unusually acidic limes known as Limón de Pica. The town has a communal hot spring with a surface temperature of 40 °C, which makes it a popular bath place in the middle of the desert. It has hotels and all basic services. The town lies four kilometers to the northeast of the oasis village of Matilla.

Pica has a mild microclimate that does not display the typical high temperature oscillations seen in many of the world's deserts. The settlement has pre-Hispanic origins and served as an important stopover for transit between the coast and the Altiplano during the time of the Inca Empire. Bird mummies of pre-Hispanic origin have been found next to Pica. Pica gained prominence over the course of the 17th, 18th and 19th centuries when it grew in association with important mining cycles of nearby areas. The first mining cycle that benefited Pica was the silver mining of Huantajaya and San Rosa between 1718 and 1790, this was then followed by a cycle of salpeter mining using the paradas method between 1830 and 1870. The town became part of Chile following the War of the Pacific (1879–1883). The Peruvian population of the town and specifically the rich and influential Peruvian families were a major concern for Chilean authorities who wished to Chilenize the area.

Pica had once an extensive irrigation system of puquios, whose shafts are locally known as socavones. In 1918 geologist Juan Brüggen mentioned the existence of 23 socavones in the Pica oasis, yet these have since then been abandoned due to economic and social changes. The socavones transported water from the Pica Aquifer to the oasis. As in many oases one of the biggest challenges for farmers in Pica is the scarcity of water. Most of the farmers in Pica own less than five hectares, and while this size hampers commercialization of products farmers have responded by organising themselves in cooperatives. Six producers, compromising one fifth of the agricultural output of the oasis, are organised in Oasis Pica Coop. This organisation was as of 2019 working to certify products as organic and enforce the appellation control for Limón de Pica. Limón de Pica have had an appellation since 2010.

== Demographics ==
According to the 2002 census of the National Statistics Institute, Pica has an area of 8,934.3 km (5,552 mi) and 6,178 inhabitants (4,569 men and 1,609 women). Of these, 4,674 (75.7%) lived in urban areas and 1,504 (24.3%) in rural areas. The population grew by 45.9% (3,666 persons) between the 1992 and 2002 censuses.

== Administration ==
As a commune, Pica is a third-level administrative division of Chile administered by a municipal council, headed by an alcalde who is directly elected every four years. Since 2016 the mayor has been Iván Infante Chacón (Ind./RN). The communal council for the 2021–2024 term has the following members:

- Juan Carlos Godoy Apala (RN)
- Claudia Jofré Rivera (RN)
- Claudia Rojas Plaza (Ind./RN)
- Patricio Vargas Briones (UDI)
- María Oxa Villagra (Ind./FA)
- Rodolfo González Lutino (DC)

Within the electoral divisions of Chile, Pica is represented in the Chamber of Deputies by Marta Isasi (Ind.) and Hugo Gutiérrez (PC) as part of the 2nd electoral district, which includes the entire Tarapacá Region. The commune is represented in the Senate by José Miguel Insulza (PS, 2018–2026) and José Durana (UDI, 2018–2026) as part of the 1st senatorial constituency (Arica and Parinacota Region and Tarapacá Region).

== Gallery ==
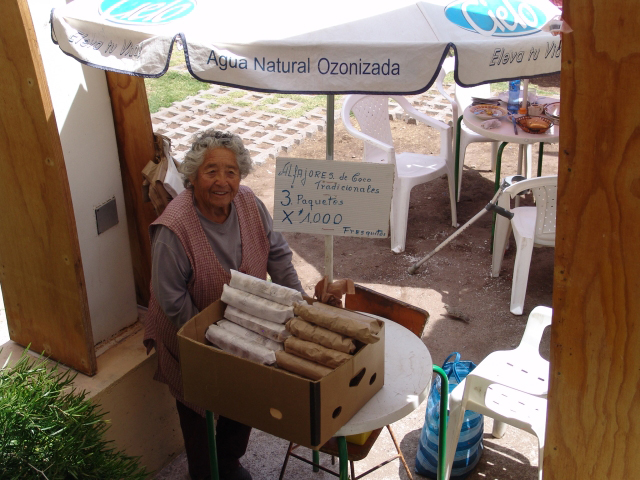
Pica Oasis Street Vendor

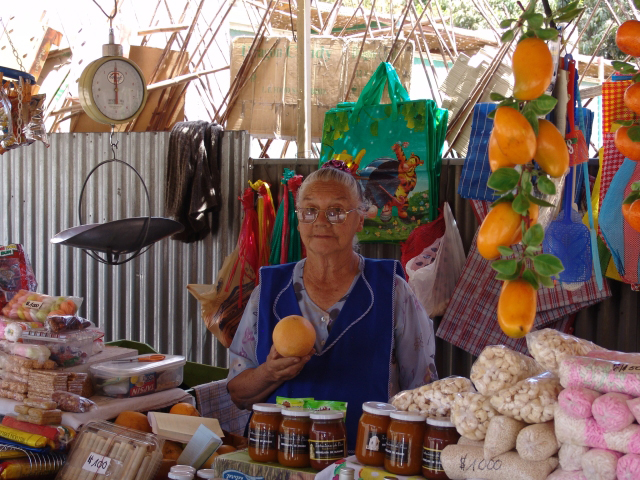
Street vendor selling locally-grown citrus.

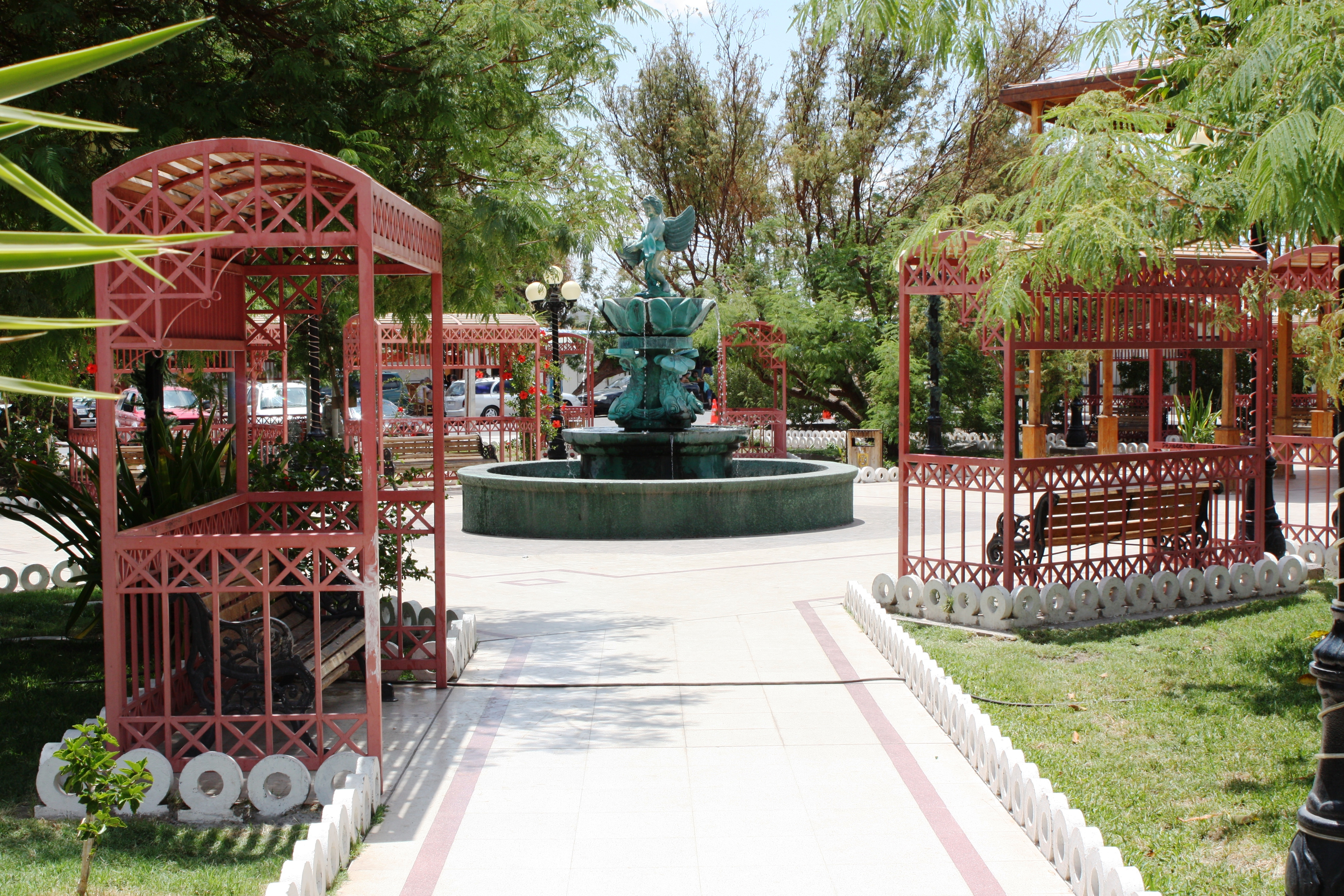
Pica's main plaza

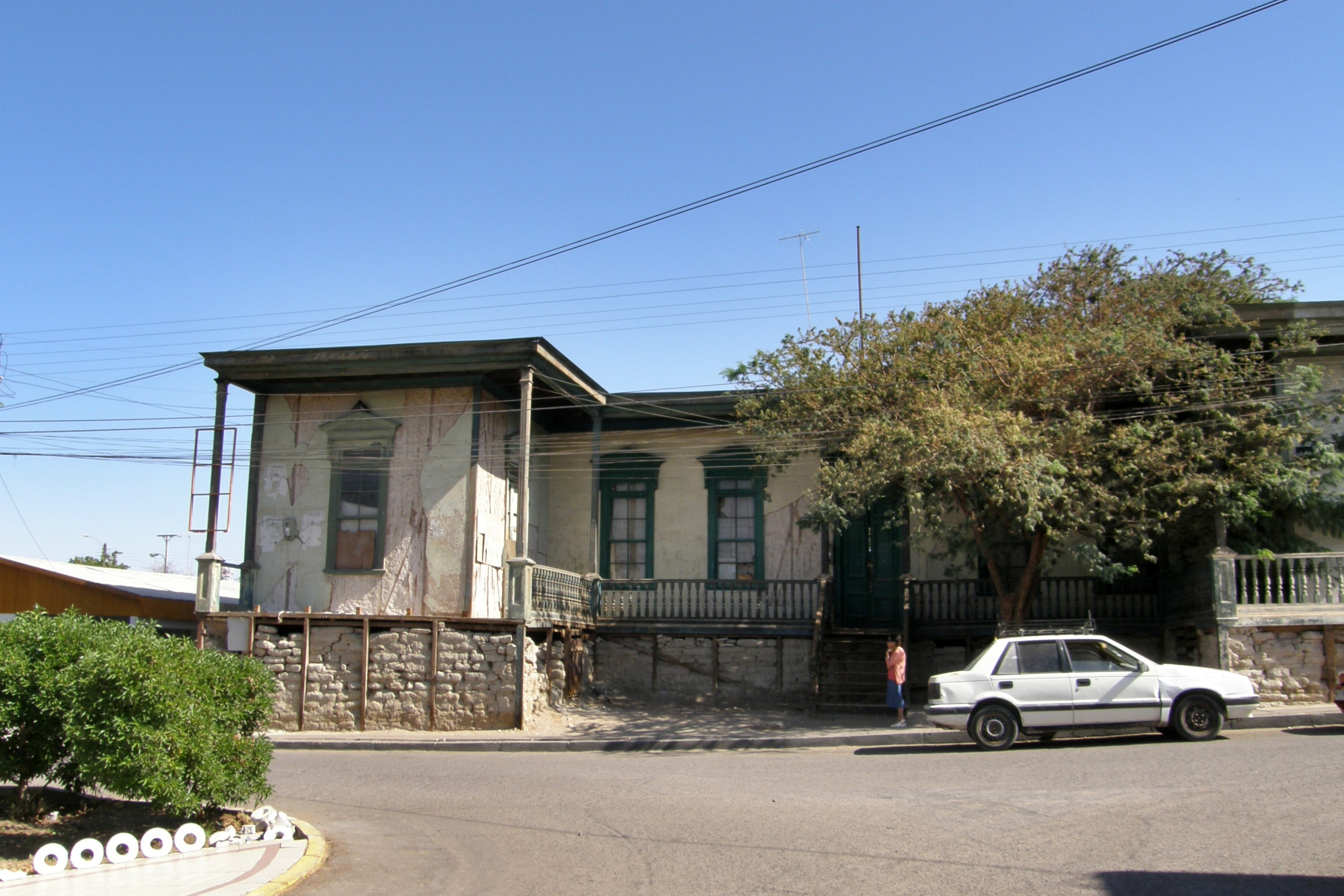
Local architecture
