= Arica Province (Peru) =

Province of Peru (1823–1929)

Arica
- Province of Peru
- 1823–1929
- Flag of Peru Coat of arms

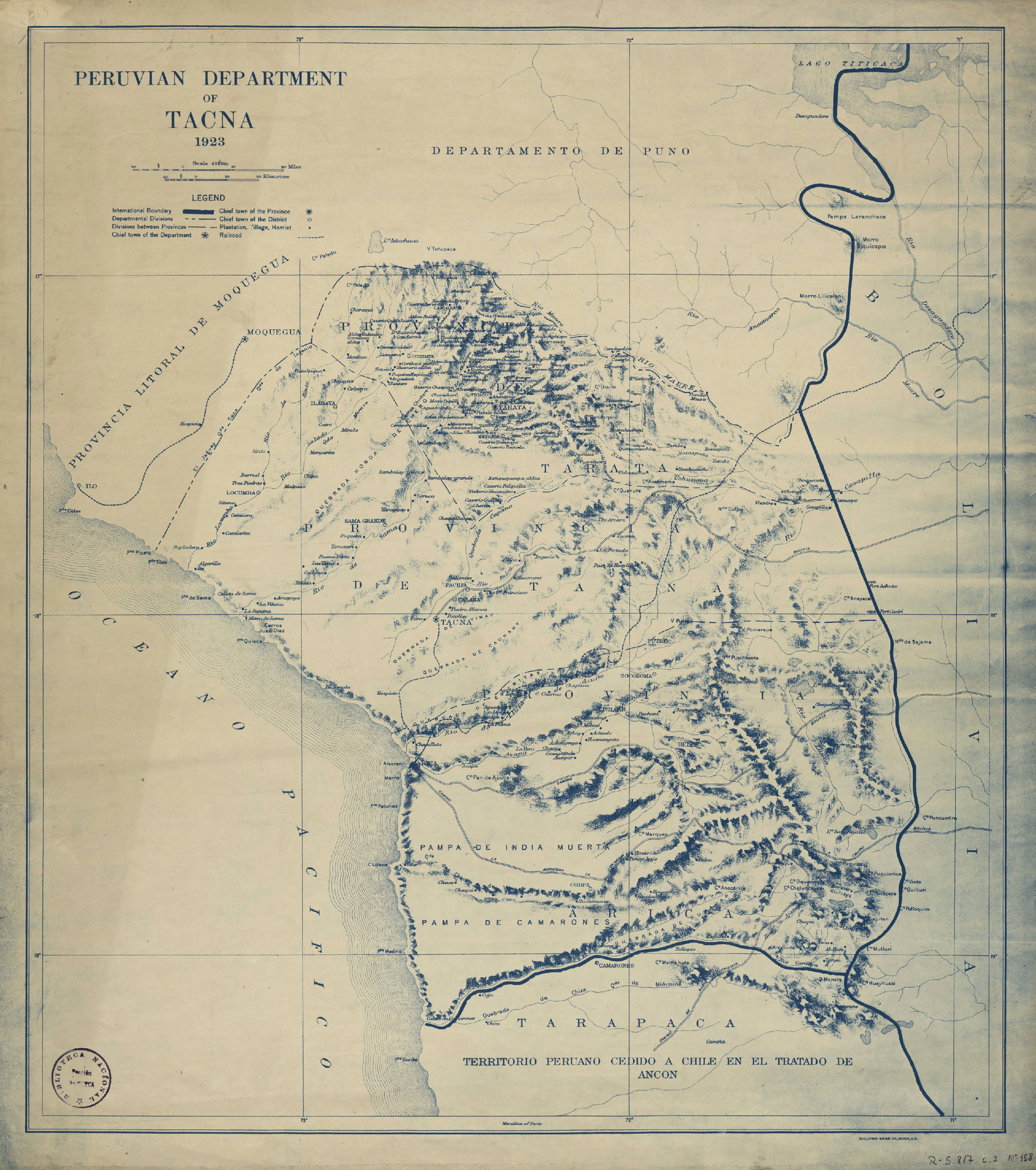
- De jure location of Arica in Peru (1923)
- Capital: Arica; Tacna (1828–1855)
- Demonym: Arican (en); Ariqueño/a (es)
- Historical era: War of the Pacific
  - Established: 12 November 1823
  - Tacna created: 25 June 1875
  - Battle of Arica: 7 June 1880
  - Treaty of Ancón: 20 October 1883
  - Province of Chile: 31 October 1883
  - Treaty of Lima: 3 June 1929
- Contained within
  - Department: Arequipa (1823–1837); Littoral (1837–1853); Moquegua (1853–1875); Tacna (1875–1929)
- Subdivisions
  - Type: Districts
  - Units: See list: Arica; Belén; Codpa; Livilcar; Lluta; Socoroma
Preceded by	Succeeded by
Partido of Arica	Arica Department
- Today part of: Chile: Arica y Parinacota

Arica (/əˈriːkə/ ə-REE-kə; Spanish: [aˈɾika]) was a province of the department of Tacna, Peru. Located in the country's southernmost coast, it existed between 1823 and 1929, having been de facto occupied by Chile since 1880 and incorporated into its territory since 1883 in the aftermath of the War of the Pacific.

Arica was, alongside Tacna, Tarata, Tarapacá and Iquique, one of five provinces occupied by Chile following the conflict. The latter two were ceded by Peru in 1883, Tarata was occupied until 1925, and Tacna and Arica were central to the 46-year territorial dispute that only concluded with the Treaty of Lima in 1929, after which Tacna was returned to Peru, while Arica was formally incorporated into the Chilean province of Tarapacá. Today, it is part of Arica y Parinacota Region.

== Etymology ==
The province's name comes from the Kunza term arisca, meaning 'new bay', or Ariacca, the name of the Inca chief who used to live in what is currently the city.

== History ==
Archaeological findings indicate that Arica was inhabited by different native groups dating back 10,000 years. These people are the first known culture to mummify their dead, predating the Egyptians by 2,000 years, and their mummies have been discovered as recently as 2004 and buried as shallow as less than 1 m beneath the surface of the city of Arica. Spanish colonization in the early 16th century saw the transformation of a small town into a thriving port.

=== Spanish period ===
Spaniards settled the land under captain Lucas Martinez de Begazo in 1541. The proportions of these are that the first made up about 66% of the population and the latter 25%. The remaining 9% were fishing-oriented people known as Camanchacos. Many of the sedentary populations are thought to have spoken the Puquina language. In 1540 the encomienda system was established in Arica and its surroundings with conquistador Lucas Martínez de Vegaso obtaining 1,638 encomienda Indians (a third of tributaries distributed). Pedro Pizarro and Pedro de la Fuente followed in numbers receiving each approximately 600 tributaries.

By 1545, Arica was the main export entrepot for Bolivian silver coming down from Potosí, which then possessed the world's largest silver mine. Arica thus held a crucial role as one of the leading ports of the Spanish Empire. These enviable riches made Arica the target for pirates, buccaneers, and privateers, among whom Francis Drake, Thomas Cavendish, Richard Hawkins, Joris van Spilbergen, John Watling, Baltazar de Cordes, Bartholomew Sharp, William Dampier, and John Clipperton all took part in looting the city. From 1540 to 1570 the population in the region of Arica shrank by 36% due to disease, death in mining or emigration to evade the harsh conditions imposed by the Spanish.

In 1570, King Philip II of Spain signed a real cédula that granted the city its own coat of arms. The port was elevated to city status, with a cabildo of its own (composed of a mayor, an Alférez Real, and other offices). He also ordered that 12 families be sent there to increase its population. 87 years later, the Count of Alba de Liste, then Viceroy of Peru, ordered that the order be formalised in its corresponding book, which was done on June 4, 1657.

The Corregimiento of San Marcos de Arica (Spanish: Corregimiento de San Marcos de Arica) was established by Viceroy Lope García de Castro in 1565. Its first corregidor was the Portuguese Francisco Rodríguez Almeida, and the curates under its jurisdiction were those of Tacna, Sama, Ilabaya and Tarapacá. In 1570 the Francisco de Toledo issued a decree reorganizing indigenous labour and taxation and among other things imposing the mita minera. In November 1604 the area was hit by an earthquake and tsunami. By 1777, the corregimiento consisted of Ilo, Tacna, Arica, Iquique, Pica, Ilabaya, Tarata, Codpa. In 1787, the corregimiento of Arica was abolished through a real cédula issued by Charles III of Spain, replaced by the intendancy system.

The Partido of Arica (Spanish: Partido de Arica) was created in 1784, with its capital in San Marcos de Arica. It was created as one of seven partidos in total created alongside the Intendancy of Arequipa, a subdivision of the Viceroyalty of Peru.

During the Peruvian War of Independence, Arica was targeted by two unsuccessful military campaigns due to its importance as one of the viceroyalty's southernmost ports, called the Intermedios. The first campaign took place from 1822 to 1823, and the second took place in late 1823. Both were repelled by the Royal Army of Peru. On June 17, 1823, the troops of Agustín Gamarra and Andrés de Santa Cruz disembarked at the port.

=== Republican period ===
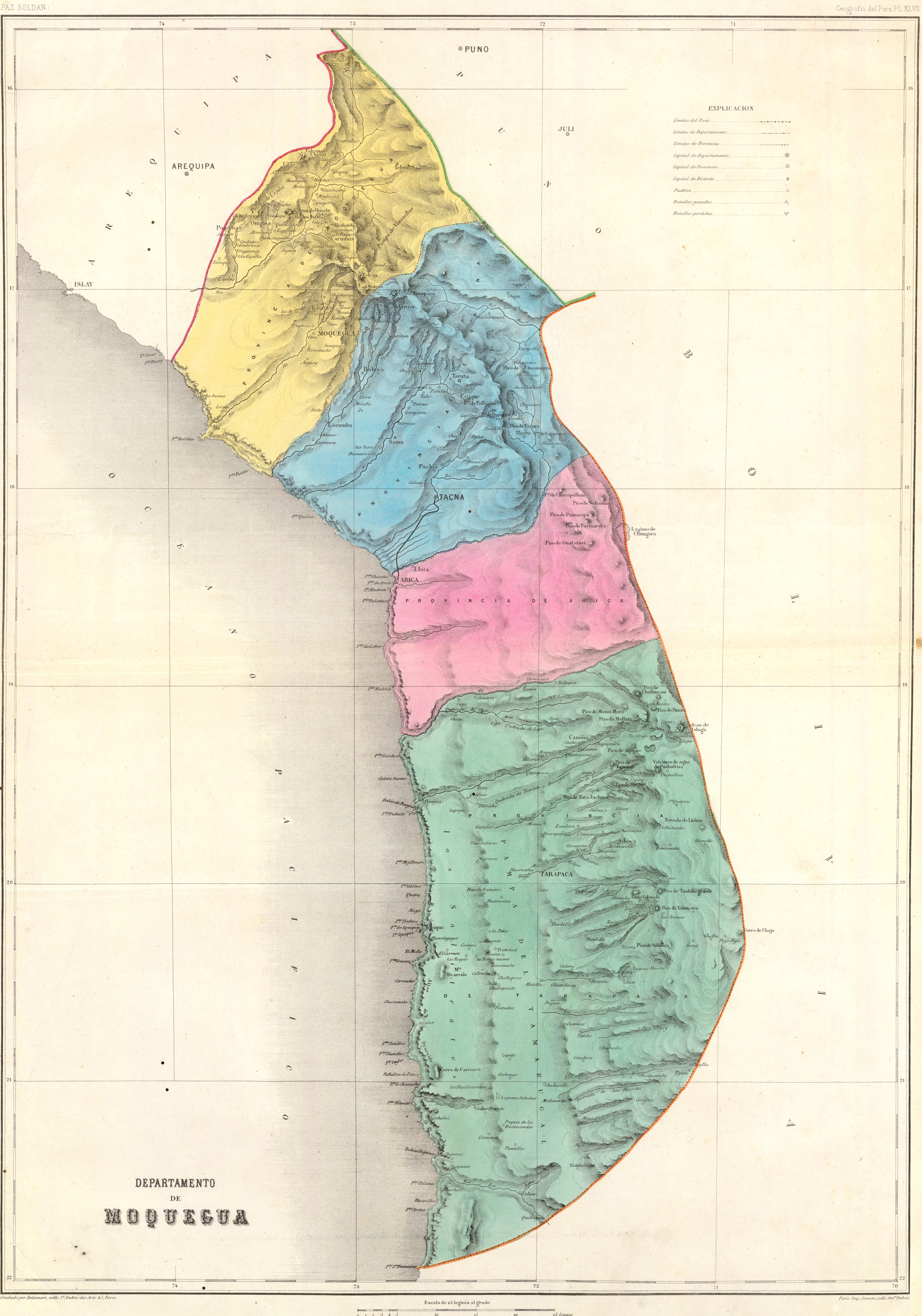
Arica (pink) within Moquegua in 1865.

The Province of Arica (Spanish: Provincia de Arica) was first established by the Constitution of Peru of 1823 as a division of the department of Arequipa. In 1828, the capital city of the province was changed from Arica to Tacna. In 1836, the port of Arica became subject to a special administration by the government of the Peru–Bolivian Confederation. In 1837, the province joined the established Department of the Littoral with its capital at Tacna. In 1853, the province was moved to the newly established Department of Moquegua, along with the provinces of Moquegua, Tacna and Tarapacá.

In 1855, the province was recreated in the department of Moquegua and divided into two provinces: Tacna and Arica. Each had their eponymous cities as political capitals. The sub-prefect resided in Arica, while the prefect continued to reside in Tacna. Each province was divided into the following districts:

Province	Districts
Arica	Arica
Arica	Codpa
Arica	Belén
Arica	Socoroma
Tacna	Tacna
Tacna	Candarave
Tacna	Ylabaya
Tacna	Locumba
Tacna	Sama

During the civil war of 1856–1858, Miguel Grau and Lizardo Montero, the two second lieutenants of the Apurímac, revolted in favour of Manuel Ignacio de Vivanco's rebellion. The Apurímac was a anchored at the time in the port of Arica, after which it was used for a failed attack that targeted Callao.

Following the decree of June 23, 1862, Monsignor Bartolomé Herrera placed and blessed the cornerstone of the first parish church of Iquique, whose iron structure was brought from Europe and installed at its main square (today Arturo Prat Square). In 1872, the parish burned down, and its tower was replaced by a Clock Tower, built in 1878 after its construction was approved the year before.

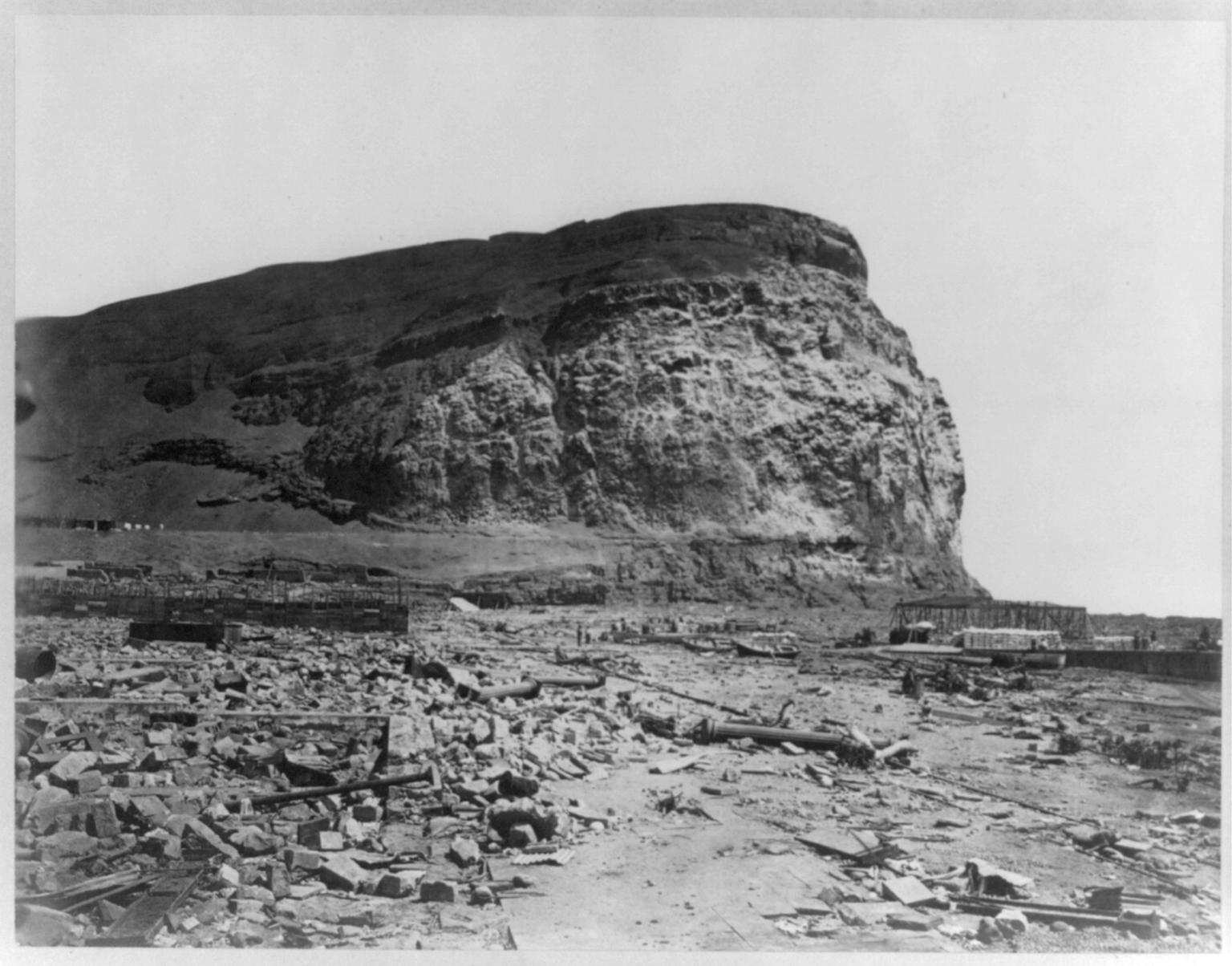
The Morro de Arica overlooking the city's ruins following the disaster of 1868.

In 1868, the city of Arica was almost completely destroyed during a high-magnitude earthquake that also affected its surroundings in Peru, as well as in Bolivia and Chile. In 1875, Arica was transferred to the newly established department of Tacna, along with the provinces of Tacna and Tarata. It was divided into six districts (Arica, Belén, Codpa, Livilcar, Lluta, and Socoroma). This was the last administrative change prior to the War of the Pacific, which began in 1879.

The first Peruvian territory to be occupied by the Chilean Army during the war was the port of Pisagua, whose occupation took place on November 2 of that year. The Chilean campaign was successful, and led to the military occupation of the provinces of Iquique and Tarapacá following the Peruvian retreat despite a military success at the battle of Tarapacá.

The first Peruvian troops that left Tarapacá arrived to the city of Arica on December 17. The following year, the Chilean Navy carried out an amphibious landing at the port city of Ilo on February 26, and the bombardment of Arica began the following day. The army continued to the south until it reached the city of Tacna on May 26, after which a battle was fought at Intiorko Hill, located on the outskirts of the city. The Chilean Army subsequently occupied the city and Bolivia withdrew from the conflict. On June 7, the Chilean advance reached Arica and, following a 55-minute battle, the city was conquered.

Colonel Francisco Bolognesi, who was killed in action, became a war hero of Peru. Fellow soldiers Alfonso Ugarte and Mariano Bustamante are also remembered in the same manner. Lieutenant Colonel Roque Sáenz Peña, a volunteer officer of the Peruvian Army, later became president of Argentina.

=== Chilean period ===
Following another campaign that reached the capital, the government of Miguel Iglesias signed the Treaty of Ancón on October 20, 1883. Under the terms of the agreement, Peru ceded its department of Tarapacá, while the provinces of Tacna and Arica would be subject to Chilean control, after which a plebiscite would be held. This never came to pass. De facto, that was the end of the Peruvian province of Arica, which was incorporated as a department of Chile's Tacna Province and subject to a process of forced acculturation, although the territorial dispute was not settled until the 1929 Treaty of Lima.

== Politics ==
The province of Arica was administered by a municipal government that also administered Arica District. The Catholic Church in Peru administered the province as part of the diocese of Arequipa. Following its occupation by Chile, it became part of its Apostolic Vicariate of Tarapacá, which became independent from Arequipa in 1882.

=== List of mayors ===
The final mayor of the province was the Italian-born businessman Domingo Pescetto Ceppi.

Mayor	Party	Term	
Mayor	Party	Begin	End
Corregidores of Arica (1565–1787)
Francisco Rodríguez Almeida	—N/a	1565	?
Fernando Inclán y Valdez	—N/a	?	1787
Mayors of Arica
Domingo Pescetto Ceppi	—N/a	fl. 1880	

=== List of priests ===
The Parish of Saint Mark served as the seat of the city's parish priest.

Name	Term	
Name	Begin	End
José Diego Chávez (Note: Parish priest.)	1871	?
Juan Vitaliano Berroa (Note: Vicar.)	March 10, 1904	February 27, 1910 (Note: Expelled, among other priests, on the orders of intendant Máximo Lira. On March 15, the group was escorted to Sama.)

=== Subdivisions ===
The province was divided into six districts in 1875, a de jure division which remained unchanged until 1929:

- Arica (Arica)
- Belén (Belén)
- Codpa (Codpa)
- Livilcar (Livilcar)
- Lluta (Molinos)
- Socoroma (Socoroma)

== Geography ==
The province was located to the north of the ravine of Camarones River.

=== Boundaries ===
The province was located in southern coast of Peru. It was limited to the north by Tacna province, to the south by the department of Tarapacá, to the east by Bolivia, and to the west by the Pacific Ocean.

== Demographics ==
In 1913, the province had 10,420 inhabitants, of which 3,700 resided in the city of Arica.

=== Ethnic groups ===
At the time of Spanish colonisation, the region was already multiethnic, displaying a mix of local sedentary populations and mitma settlers from the Altiplano.

In 1929, when the province was ceded to Chile, a Peruvian community remained in the province.

=== Notable people ===
- Guillermo Billinghurst y Angulo (1851–1915), President of Peru from 1912 to 1914.
- Rómulo Cúneo y Vidal (1856–1931) writer and historian who served as consul in Antofagasta (1903–1908).
- Jean-François Dauxion-Lavaysse (c. 1770–c. 1830), first director of the National Museum and Botanical Garden of Santiago. He died in Arica.
- Ramiro Pérez Reinoso (1901–1994), intellectual
- Hipólito Unanue y Pavón (1755–1833), physician and President of Congress from 1822 to 1823.
- Gerardo Vargas Hurtado (1869–1941), Peruvian author and journalist who campaigned for the return of Arica and Tacna during the dispute.

== Economy ==
During the Spanish period, Arica was one of the main ports in the continent, and an important part of the silver trade route in the area. This period of prosperity continued into 1770, when commerce was rerouted to what became the Viceroyalty of the Río de la Plata. Despite the effects on the local economy, local demand allowed the port to continue actively operating as part of the guano industry. Following Peruvian independence, the town's influence was further reduced due to its adherence to the Royalist cause, with Tacna replacing it as the local administrative centre. Under Chile's administration, the province regained some of its influence with the opening of the Arica–La Paz railway in 1913.

== Culture ==
Arica's fertile location allowed for pre-Columbian peoples to settle there long before the arrival of the Spanish in 1540. During the period of Chilean administration, the city's remaining Peruvian population was both subjected to a process of forced acculturation, and responsible for a prolongued anti-Chilean campaign.

=== Landmarks ===
Despite its 16th-century origins, most of the area was reconstructed following the 1868 earthquake. A number of buildings built in the following decade survived the war and have continued to exist ever since, with some eventually having been designated as National Monuments of Chile.

Name	Location	Notes	Photo
Aduana de Arica	Arturo Prat 305	The neoclassical building was built by the company of Gustave Eiffel, commissioned by José Balta in 1871 to replace its destroyed predecessor building. It functioned as a customs house until 1977.	
Casa Bolognesi	Yungay 304	Built in 1870, it served as the headquarters of the Peruvian command prior to the 1880 battle, prior to which Chilean soldier Juan de la Cruz Salvo was sent as an envoy to request the surrender of the local forces, who refused.	
Casa Yanulaque	General Lagos 509	The 19th-century building served as a warehouse prior to the war. Following the establishment of a Chilean administration, it served as a local meeting group for the Peruvian community.	
Ferrocarril Tacna-Arica	Comandante San Martín 799	The railway and its stations were built in 1856 by The Arica & Tacna Railway Company, based in England. The former has a total length of 62 km (39 mi) and a track gauge of 1,435 mm (4.708 ft). It was one of the concessions of the 1929 treaty.	
Mercado Central de Arica	Rafael Sotomayor 340	The building was built in 1875. During the Spanish period, it belonged to Gaspar de Oviedo, who later ceded the land to the Franciscan order. The land where the current market stands was used to build a convent in 1712. Beneath its surface lies a network of tunnels that were used as a refuge from pirate attacks and, later, as underground connections between other monasteries and churches. It was then used by the cavalry of the Peruvian regiment until the earthquake of 1868.	
Parish of Saint Mark	Bolognesi 170	The Gothic Revival church was built by the company of Gustave Eiffel, commissioned by José Balta in response to a local women's group's request. It was inaugurated in 1876.	

== Transport ==
In 1856 the English company The Arica & Tacna Railway Co. built a railway line that connected the cities of Arica and Tacna. The railway continued to operate after the war.

In 1913, a second railway line was opened, which connected the province—by then under Chilean administration—with the Bolivian city of La Paz.

== See also ==
- Consequences of the War of the Pacific
- Chilean–Peruvian territorial dispute
- Department of Tarapacá (Peru)
- Tacna Province (Chile)
- Treaty of Lima (1929)
- Tacna Province
