= Arica Department =

Department of Chile (1883–1979)

Arica
- Department of Chile
- 1883–1979
- Flag

- Arica Department within Tacna Province
- Capital: Arica
- Demonym: Ariqueño
- Historical era: War of the Pacific
  - Treaty of Ancón: 20 October 1883
  - Established: 31 October 1884
  - Treaty of Lima: 28 August 1929
  - Reorganised: 26 October 1979
- Contained within
  - Province: Tacna (1884–1929); Tarapacá (1930–1979)
- Subdivisions
  - Type: Communes
  - Units: See list: Arica; Putre; Belén; Codpa; General Lagos
Preceded by	Succeeded by
Arica Province	Arica Province; Parinacota Province
- Today part of: Chile; Peru

Arica (/əˈriːkə/ ə-REE-kə; Spanish: [aˈɾika]) was a department of Tacna (1884–1929) and Tarapacá (1930–1979), two provinces of Chile. Located in the Atacama Desert, it existed between 1884 and 1979. Prior to its formal establishment, its area had already been de facto administered by the Chilean Army since 1880, following an eight month military campaign that took place during the War of the Pacific. Its capital was the city of Arica.

The Treaty of Ancón, which put an end to the war, was signed on October 20, 1883. The following year, the province was formally created on October 31, incorporating the former Peruvian provinces of Tacna, Arica and Tarata, the latter of which would be constested due to differing interpretations of the course of the Sama River, the province's provisional northern border. Under the treaty, the territory would be administered by Chile for a ten-year period, after which a plebiscite would determine its fate. Originally meant to be held in 1894, was ultimately not carried out.

The dispute regarding Tacna and Arica continued into 1929, during which relations soured following the local acculturation policy of the Chilean government and the active campaigning by Peruvian locals. The dispute ended through the signing of the Treaty of Lima, under which Tacna would be returned to Peru, while Arica would be formally incorporated into Chile.

Following the disestablishment of the Chilean province of Tacna, the department was incorporated into Tarapacá in 1930. It remained part of this province until the restructuring of the administrative organisation of the country, when Tarapacá was made into a region in 1974. In 1979, the regions were divided into provinces. This reestructuring ultimately separated Arica into two provinces: Arica and Parinacota. Both provinces would eventually form part of Arica y Parinacota Region in 2007.

== Etymology ==
The province's name comes from the Kunza term arisca, meaning 'new bay', or Ariacca, the name of the Inca chief who used to live in what is currently the city.

== History ==
The province was first established on October 31, 1883 by a law promulgated by President Domingo Santa María which defined its limits as the Tacna Province to the north, the Quebrada de Camarones to the south, the Andes mountain range to the east, and the Pacific Ocean to the west. This was under the conditions of Treaty of Ancón, by means of which Chile achieved dominion over the Tarapacá Department, and possession of the provinces of Tacna and Arica for a decade, after which a plebiscite was to be held in 1894 to determine the region's sovereignty, however, it was never carried out. The provisional legal organization would end up working for 50 years, until 1929. During its early years, resistance was at its peak, with some Peruvian military personnel organizing guerrillas, such as Gregorio Albarracín's, of about a hundred men, which were defeated in battle in 1882, with Albarracín and his son being killed in action.

On April 23, 1921, measles in epidemic form was reported in the province, as well as neighboring Antofagasta, occurring among troops. At the same time, smallpox was reported present.

On June 3, 1929 the Treaty of Lima was signed by then Peruvian Representative Pedro José Rada y Gamio and Chilean Representative Emiliano Figueroa Larrain, leading to the effective return of Tacna to Peru at midnight, on the 28th of August 1929, creating the Department of Tacna, and Arica (both the former Peruvian Department as well as some territory of the Department of Tacna ceded by the treaty) was permanently given to Chile, being integrated into the Tarapacá Province, ending the existence of the Chilean Province of Tacna. Nevertheless, even with the border conflict officially over, controversy would continue among nationals of both Peru and Bolivia, who would continue her claims over her lost territories, seeking once again a connection to the ocean with the assistance of international mediators on the issue which is yet to be solved, and continues to this day. The handover had no official ceremony, with some Chilean officials temporarily staying behind to assist Peru regarding the new administration. Nonetheless, the return of the territory was met with ceremonies in Peru, with President Augusto B. Leguía overseeing a military parade in Lima, and church bells ringing in celebration. Some Chilean citizens, who had remained in the province after the handover asked to be repatriated.

In 1930, after remaining a year without belonging to any province, the department became part of Tarapacá Province. In 1979, the administrative organisation of the country was restructured, and Tarapacá was made into a region in 1974. In 1979, the regions were divided into provinces, with Arica becoming two provinces: Arica and Parinacota. Both provinces would eventually form part of Arica y Parinacota Region in 2007.

== Administration ==
According to a law of December 30, 1927, in the Department of Arica the following communes and sub-delegations were created:

Comuna	Subdelegaciones
Arica	Morro
Arica	Azapa
Arica	Lluta
Putre	Putre
Belén	Belén
Codpa	Codpa
General Lagos	General Lagos

The communes of Arica, Putre, Belén, Codpa and General Lagos, all formed a single municipal group, whose head was the city of Arica.

== See also ==
- Treaty of Ancón
- Tacna Province (Chile)
