= Chilean–Peruvian territorial dispute =

Territorial dispute between Chile and Peru

Chilean–Peruvian conflict
- Part of the South American territorial disputes
- Map of the dispute's resolution in 1929
Date	1883 – present
Location	Chile–Peru border (since 2014); Tacna–Arica (1883–1929)
Result	The Treaty of Lima is signed in 1929, with Peru keeping Tacna and ceding Arica to Chile.; The International Court of Justice rules in favor of Peru in 2014, ceding the country some maritime territory.

Belligerents
Chile	Peru

The Chilean–Peruvian territorial dispute was a territorial dispute between Chile and Peru that started in the aftermath of the War of the Pacific and ended significantly in 1929 with the signing of the Treaty of Lima and in 2014 with a ruling by the International Court of Justice. The dispute applies since 2014 to a 37,610 km^{2} territory in the Chile–Peru border, as a result of the settled maritime dispute between both states.

The Treaty of Ancón, which put an end to the War of the Pacific, was signed on October 20, 1883. The following year, Chile formally incorporated the former Peruvian provinces of Tacna, Arica and Tarata into a province on October 31, the latter of which would be constested due to differing interpretations of the course of the Sama River, the provisional border. Under the treaty, the territory would be administered by Chile for a ten-year period, after which a plebiscite would determine its fate. Originally meant to be held in 1894, was ultimately not carried out.

During the early years of the post-war era, the Chilean and Peruvian governments exercised extensive campaigns to solidify their control over the region. On one hand, Peru established a campaign of foreign support, which attracted the attention of the United States as a mediator in the conflict. On the other hand, Chile pursued an acculturation policy that saw the establishment of Chilean culture and a Chilean population in the region. Local Peruvian loyalists also established resistance movements, which saw armed combat on at least one occasion. To counter this and to incite an exodus of Peruvians that remained in the area, groups known as Patriotic Leagues were established.

The dispute continued into 1929, ending through the signing of the Treaty of Lima, under which Tacna would be returned to Peru, while Arica would be formally incorporated into Chile. The handover of Tacna took place at midnight on August 28, 1929, marking the end of the Chilean administration. Following the main dispute's resolution, a minor continuation would evolve into an international law case concerning a disputed maritime zone between both states. The International Court of Justice judged in favour of Peru in 2014, after which a 37,610 km^{2} territory immediately east of the Pacific Ocean has become the only unresolved aspect of the dispute as a whole.

== Background ==
Unlike other South American border conflicts, after the Chilean and Peruvian wars of independence, both countries did not share a border until 1883 due to Bolivia's Litoral Department. With the War of the Pacific beginning in 1879, the Chilean land and naval campaigns saw quick success, with the war ending with Peru signing the Treaty of Ancón in 1883, and Bolivia signing the Treaty of Valparaiso the following year.

As a result of the treaty of Ancón, Peru ceded its department of Tarapacá and established the Sama River as the new provisional border with Chile, while the Chilean government administered the territories of Tacna and Arica under the newly established Tacna Province until a plebiscite could be held in 1894. From 1890 to 1929, Locumba served as the provisional capital of the area of the Department of Tacna not under Chilean administration, which came to be known as "Free Tacna" (Spanish: Tacna libre), while Tacna and Arica would be referred to as the "captive provinces" (Spanish: provincias cautivas).

== Tacna and Arica dispute ==
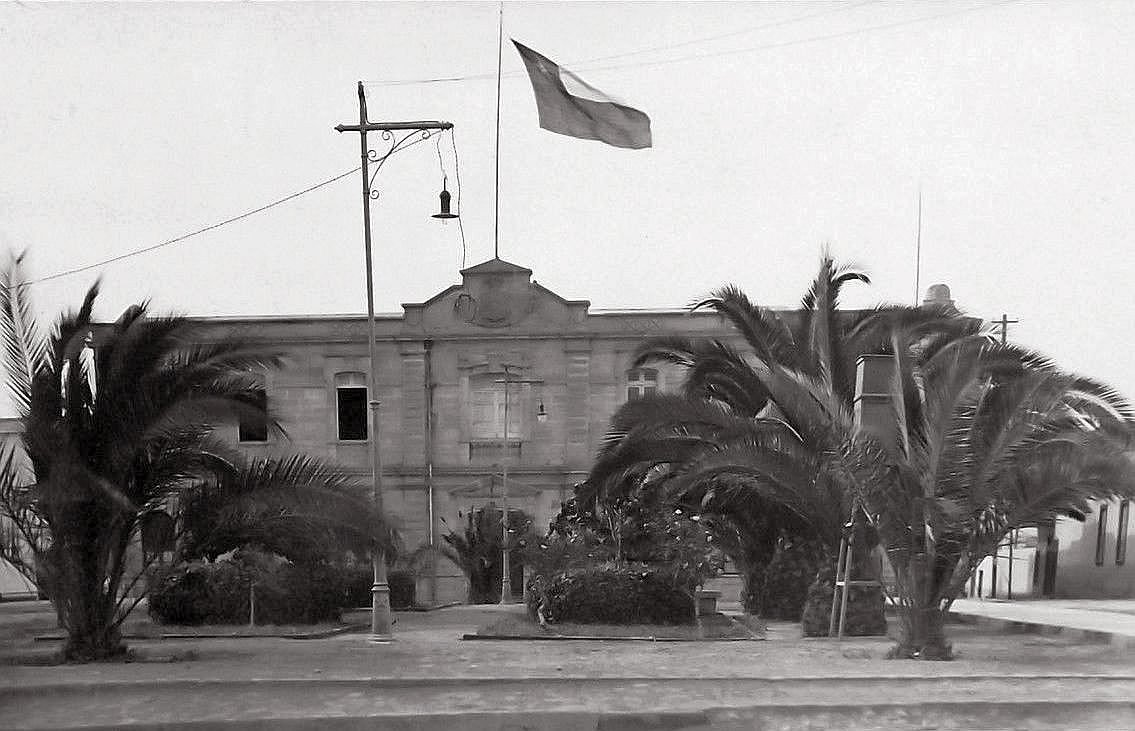
The Tacna Prefecture in 1920

The Tacna–Arica dispute (Note: Also called the Tacna–Arica question (Spanish: Cuestión de Tacna y Arica) or the Tacna–Arica case (Spanish: Caso Tacna-Arica).) was the main dispute between both states and a focus of Peru's foreign policy during the early 20th century.

In the aftermath of the signing of the Treaty of Ancón, the Department of Tarapacá was unconditionally ceded to Chile, who administered the territory as a province of its own, while the provinces of Tacna and Arica were placed under the administration of the new Tacna Province. As per the treaty, a plebiscite was to be held in 1894, which would determine the fate of the province. The plebiscite, however, was never carried out. Chile's Tacna Province was administered by an intendant, who resided in the city of Tacna.

=== Negotiations ===
==== Negotiations before 1894 ====
In early 1893, Peruvian Minister José Mariano Jiménez Wald requested that Chile hold a plebiscite in compliance with the treaty. In August 1893, Peru proposed, within the framework of the plebiscite, that if Peru won, it would offer Chile customs advantages. Chile also rejected the proposal. At the end of 1893, Peru proposed that the plebiscite should be held on March 28, 1894, and that if it did not take place, a friendly power should arbitrate who would be entitled to the material possession of the provinces. Chile did not respond to the Peruvian proposal. The Peruvian proposals made Chile aware of the precarious position it would be in should a plebiscite be held in Arica and Tacna. Chilean authorities began to devise strategies in anticipation of the increasingly imminent plebiscite.

In early 1894, discussions began regarding the form of the plebiscite. Peruvian and Chilean positions clashed on two key issues: who should receive the vote (elections) and compensation and occupations. There was no consensus on voting rights. Chile insisted that literacy was a requirement for voting, which excluded a large segment of Peru's indigenous population. Peru, for its part, did not want single people or those without stable residency to vote, which would disadvantage Chile.

Regarding reparations and occupations, it was agreed that each losing country would retain a portion of the disputed territory. Given this situation, the amount of reparations should be reduced, as the entire territory would not be lost. Peru's proposal was that if Chile lost, the border would be the northern bank of the Vítor ravine in Arica. If Peru lost, the border would be the southern bank of the Quero ravine in Arica. The losing country would pay 7,000,000 pesos, instead of the original 10,000,000. Chile's proposal was to hold the plebiscite only in the Camarones-Vítor region, and the reparations would be reduced to 4,000,000 pesos. Ultimately, no agreement was reached to hold the plebiscite.

==== Negotiations after 1894 ====
Chile made a proposal to Peru outside the framework of the treaty, attempting to persuade Peru to hand over the regions without a plebiscite in exchange for an indemnity of 14,000,000 pesos plus the return of the monitor Huáscar. If Peru insisted on a plebiscite, Chile's plan was to demand an additional 5,000,000 pesos for claims made by Chileans harmed during the war. Chile threatened to cede its rights under the treaty to Bolivia, which, combined with the aforementioned proposal, created significant pressure to hand over the cities without a plebiscite.

Peru categorically refused this agreement, and in a new round of negotiations in August 1895, Chilean Ambassador Máximo Lira began demanding Peruvian guarantees for the payment of the indemnity in order to force the handover of the cities without a plebiscite. Peru offered several monetary guarantees, but none were accepted by Chile. Peruvian Foreign Minister Ricardo Ortiz de Zevallos proposed a solution: if Peru did not pay an indemnity within a given timeframe, the cities would be returned. Lira took a keen interest in the matter, but the proposal was rejected by the Peruvian cabinet.

In 1896, the two governments suspended negotiations, blaming each other for their failure. The threat of surrendering the rights to Bolivia was part of the so-called Bolivian policy, which aimed to bring Chile closer to Bolivia. Chile would cede a portion of the sea to Bolivia if it won the occupied provinces, and Chile would also gain an international ally and a large market for its businesses.

Peruvian President Nicolás de Piérola later tasked Guillermo Billinghurst with seeking an agreement with Chile, and they signed the Billinghurst-Latorre Protocol, which stipulated that the plebiscite would be held according to terms arbitrated by the Queen of Spain. On September 26, 1898, news arrived in Tacna and Arica that the Chilean government would return both provinces, but that this was pending approval from the National Congress of Chile. However, the Congress endlessly delayed the protocol, which ended with its rejection in the chamber. By that time, Chilean authorities had begun to devise an acculturation plan that aimed to increase the number of Chilean residents in the area before a plebiscite. The back-and-forth maneuvering in Chilean diplomacy sought to buy time to "Chileanize" the province.

The demonstration held by the people of Arica the day before yesterday once again reveals how much they yearn for their freedom. The news of the approval of the Billinghurst Latorre Protocol by the Chamber of Deputies in Chile... From that moment on, all was joy. Cheers for Peru rang out amidst the thunderous noise of countless rockets being set off throughout the town, as well as the ringing of church bells. That night, a beautiful civic procession took place, led by the town band and carrying a Peruvian flag. After winding through the main streets, it ended in the small plaza on 28 de Julio Street, where the people were treated to wine and beer until midnight, when the celebrations dispersed.

— Morro de Arica (Peruvian newspaper), September 28, 1898.

==== Acculturation policies ====
Alongside the negotiations, the Chilean government initiated a policy of acculturation. One example was the transfer of Iquique's Court of Appeals, created in 1884, to Tacna in 1887. Additionally, funds were allocated for public buildings, and all Peruvian schools located in the towns of Codpa, Belén, Estique, Socoroma, Para, San Miguel de Azapa, Calana, Pachía, Tarata, Putre, Tacna, Arica, and Livílcar were closed.

After fifteen years, we have remembered that we must Chileanize Tacna and Arica, that is, that we must win them for the good of our territory [...] it was just and right to abolish the schools maintained by the Peruvian government [...] it was right and legal to abolish those publicly maintained by a foreign government and subject the rest to Chilean plans and textbooks; but not to abolish them all. Those teachers will now continue to teach in private homes, and their teaching will certainly not be favorable to Chile.

— La Unión (Chilean newspaper), January 1901.

On November 14, 1900, the measure was condemned by Peru's Foreign Minister, Enrique de la Riva Agüero, and its consul in Santiago, Cesáreo Chacaltana. The Chilean response was that: "The Chamber agrees that the background information be sent to the Executive Branch so that new steps may be taken to comply with Clause 3 of the Treaty of Ancón." It could be said that Chile was stalling for Chileanization, which is why Chacaltana protested and submitted his letter of resignation. Consequently, diplomatic relations were severed in 1901.

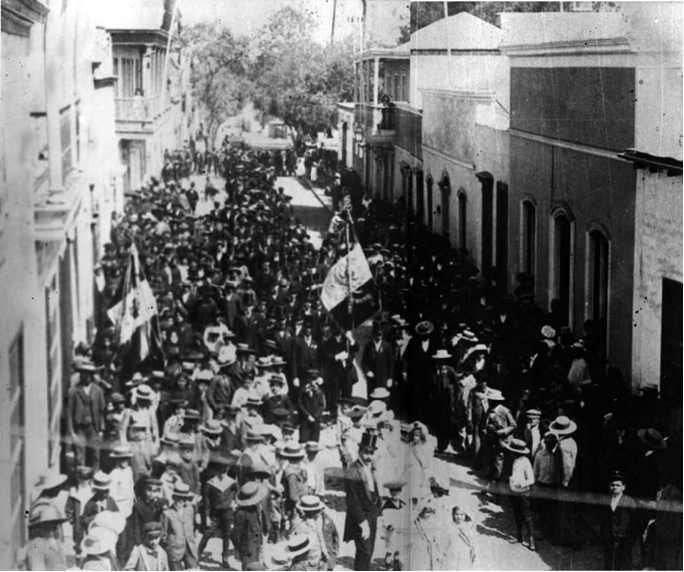
Peruvians parade with their flag in 1901.

Chilean Governor Manuel Montt prohibited the celebrations of Peru's Independence on July 28, 1900. The Peruvian newspaper Morro de Arica published: "Today we will not celebrate the anniversary of our political emancipation with the splendor of other years, contenting ourselves with raising an altar to the homeland in the deepest recesses of our hearts and in the silence that has been imposed upon us." In 1901, despite this restriction, Tacna's Sociedad de Auxilios Mutuos El Porvenir, a mutual aid society, requested permission from the mayor of Tacna, Salvador Vergara Álvarez, to hold a ceremony to bless the institution's new flag. With permission granted, the first Flag Procession took place on July 28, 1901.

==== Negotiations in 1905 ====
Diplomatic relations were resumed as a result of the agreement between Chile and Bolivia, which stipulated the construction of the Arica–La Paz railway. Peru protested this, arguing that it implied an exercise of sovereignty, when all it possessed was legal possession, which should be validated by a plebiscite, as per the 1883 treaty. Chile responded that "they were as sovereign over Tacna and Arica as they were over Santiago," until a plebiscite was held. This restarted negotiations and Peru sent a new minister to Chile, Manuel Álvarez Calderón, who accepted the Chilean proposal to extend the plebiscite period by five years, but since this implied Chileanization, he requested that the plebiscite formalities be established beforehand through arbitration by a friendly power. The Chilean Minister of Foreign Affairs, Antonio Huneeus, rejected this proposal. Álvarez Calderón later proposed a two-year recess followed by arbitration, which Chile also rejected. The year 1905 ended without any progress. Chilean President Germán Riesco appointed Máximo Lira as intendant of Tacna, who accelerated the Chileanization process, ending the conflicts among the Chileans themselves.

==== Negotiations in 1907 and 1908 ====
Talks continued between the new ministers Federico Puga Borne of Chile and Guillermo Seoane of Peru, with the Chilean minister proposing a series of preliminary issues before defining the plebiscite model. Peru rejected them, arguing that the plebiscite was the fundamental and paramount matter; other issues could be addressed later. Discussions then began on how to conduct the plebiscite: Peru wanted to hold it immediately after the protocol was ratified, while Chile preferred to wait six months, a position that suited its ongoing policy of Chileanization.

With regard to voters, Peru excluded foreigners, public officials, and soldiers from the region, while Chile denied the vote to illiterate people and to natives of Tacna and Arica who did not reside there. They agreed to register voters, hold the elections, and count the ballots; there would be one representative from Chile, one from Peru, and one from a neutral power. However, Chile demanded to preside over these bodies. The progress of Chileanization, which included an investment of 1,000,000 pesos for agricultural and industrial development, was used to improve the Chilean police headquarters, the facilities of the Chilean newspaper "El Pacífico," and other public works.

==== Ecclesiastical controversy ====
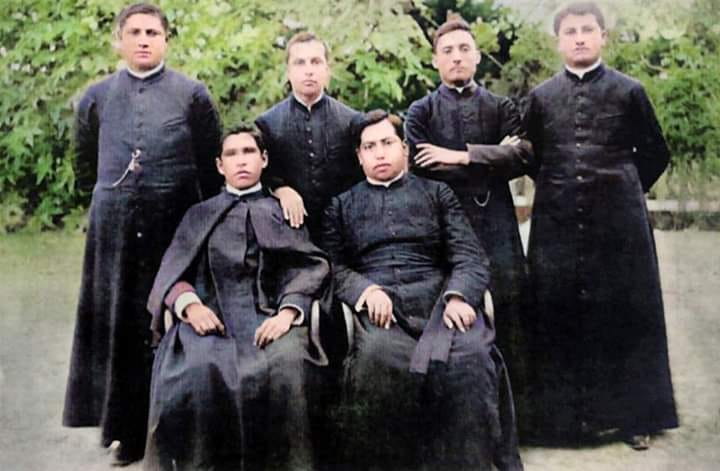
The expelled priests in 1910.

Ecclesiastically, Tacna and Arica were under the jurisdiction of the Diocese of Arequipa, and therefore the priests in both cities were Peruvian. They were responsible for maintaining Peruvian patriotism and preventing Chileanization. In an attempt to counter this, Chile sent its own priests to the cities. The Peruvian parishes of Tacna and Arica also kept records of births and baptisms in the region, and the baptismal records were safeguarded by the priests for use during the plebiscite.

The Chilean clergy needed permission from the head of the Peruvian diocese, Mariano Holguín, to carry out their mission, which he denied. Chile began to petition the Holy See for approval for the Chilean priests, but they refused to intervene. Chile then resorted to force, invoking the right of patronage inherited from the kings of Spain, which granted them the power to approve the appointment of religious figures to their positions. Invoking this decree, all parish churches were closed. An exception was made for the church in Tacna, whose pastor, José Félix Andía (1895–1909), was esteemed by both Chileans and Peruvians. Upon his death, this parish was also closed.

The Peruvian prelates continued their ministry under precarious conditions, in private homes and chapels, prompting the Chilean government to decree the arrest and expulsion of all Peruvian priests. This took place in 1909, the year in which the cities of Tacna and Arica were left without religious services, leading to another break in diplomatic relations between the two countries.

==== The Patriotic Leagues ====
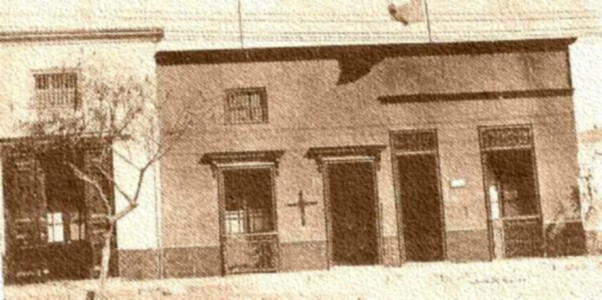
A Peruvian house in Tacna branded with a black cross by the Mazorqueros.

In 1909, Chilean ultranationalist civil organizations, known as the "patriotic leagues", were formed with names such as Mano Negra, Mazorqueros, Sociedad Estrella de Chile, and Liga Patriótica de Tacna. They persecuted Peruvians, burning houses, schools, newspapers, clubs, and businesses. Paramilitaries, under the alleged protection of the government, committed murders and disappearances. This led to a renewed break in diplomatic relations between Chile and Peru, and Peruvian residents were expelled. They promoted their actions through pamphlets such as El Eco Patrio, La Liga Patriótica, El Chileno, and El Lucas Gómez.

On July 18, 1911, approximately eight hundred Chilean laborers working on the Arica-La Paz railway were in Tacna when they attacked and destroyed the Peruvian newspapers La Voz del Sur and El Tacora within four hours. They then entered the Club de la Unión and vandalized the premises. The Freyre family accuses lawyer Salvador Allende Castro of orchestrating the attack. The Peruvian newspaper El Morro de Arica, published until 1911, was shut down by the Chilean administration. The Chilean government unsuccessfully attempted to dissolve these organizations in 1912.

==== Negotiations in 1912 ====
Peru presented the case of Tacna and Arica in international forums such as the Second Pan-American Conference (Mexico, 1901-1902) and the Bolivarian Congress of Caracas (1911). In 1912, a fight broke out in Callao between Chilean sailors who had landed and Peruvians from the area, resulting in deaths and injuries. Peru compensated all those affected, including the Chileans.

Peruvian President Guillermo Billinghurst, a native of Arica, granted his Foreign Minister Valera broad powers to offer Chile a solution that would be attractive to them. The Peruvian proposal incorporated Chilean suggestions and was as follows: First, the postponement of the plebiscite until 1933. Second, the polling stations would be staffed by five members: two from each country and the President of the Chilean Supreme Court. Third, the voters would be those born in the area, and Chileans and Peruvians residing there for at least three years, who also had to be literate. Fourth, Chile would pay 500,000 pounds sterling as compensation for the postponement.

In Chile, the proposal was rejected, despite its advantages for the country, which led to the resignation of Foreign Minister Antonio Huneeus. In Peru, Guillermo Billinghurst was overthrown on February 4, 1914, in a military coup led by Colonel Oscar R. Benavides.

=== The plebiscite ===
==== Arbitration by the United States ====
After World War I, US President Woodrow Wilson advocated a new world order founded on various virtues, including justice and the self-determination of peoples. Based on this premise, on December 27, 1919, Peru declared that Chile had not respected the Treaty of Ancón and therefore it was null and void, and that Tacna, Arica, and Tarapacá should be returned to Peru.

Peru requested that Wilson dedicate himself to the matter of the treaty, and the US president called on both nations to re-establish diplomatic relations. He offered the United States' assistance as an arbitrator. Chile agreed to arbitration of procedural details, adding that separate consultations would also be held in both cities. At the same time, Peru presented its claims against Chile to the League of Nations, requesting a review of the treaty regarding Tacna and Arica, because it had been breached by Chile in relation to the plebiscite issue in both cities.

In January 1922, the United States invited Peru and Chile to resume talks. Peru and Chile accepted its arbitration and agreed to resolve the matter with President Warren G. Harding. They met in Washington, D. C., from May 15 to July 20, 1922. The agreement reached by both countries was to carry out what was stipulated in Article III of the Treaty of Ancón and that the differences would be resolved by the President of the United States of America.

Ezequiel Ossio from Tarapacá, along with Isaac Alzamora and Víctor Andrés Belaúnde, requested that President Harding declare the Treaty of Ancón null and void, as it contained multiple violations of the Law of Nations. In 1925, President Arbitrator Calvin Coolidge issued the final ruling, maintaining that the Treaty of Ancón was in force, that the plebiscite should be held, that Tarapacá was not in dispute, and that the province of Tarata should be returned to Peru. The arbitration granted voting rights to all those born in Tacna and Arica, as well as to residents, until the final protocol was signed in Washington, D.C.

==== Arbitration over Tarata ====
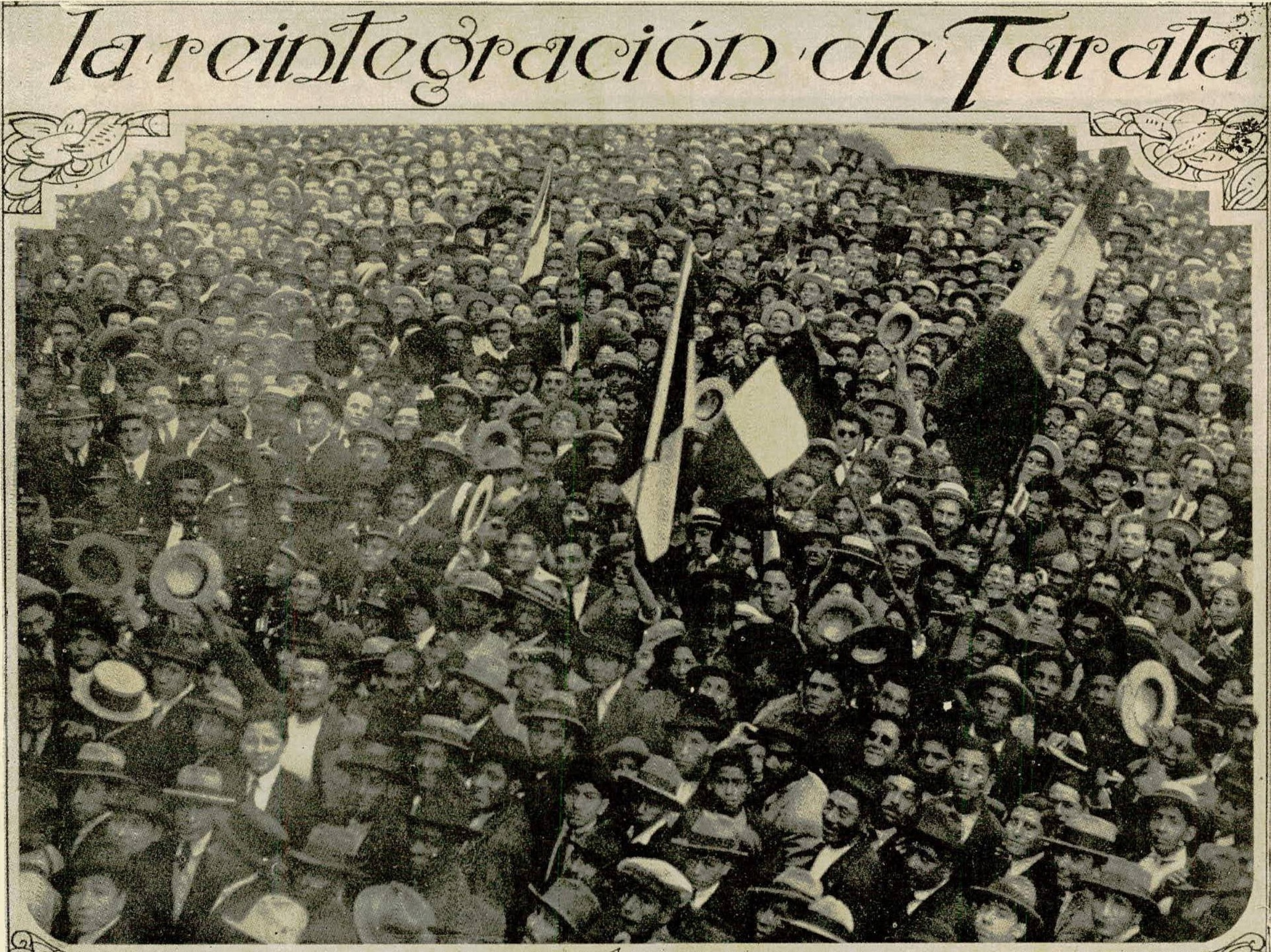
The handover of Tarata as seen in Mundial, a Peruvian magazine.

At the time of the signing of this treaty, the department of Tacna had three provinces: Tacna, Arica and Tarata.

In 1885, Chile had occupied Tarata, an act protested by the Peruvian government, who argued that it did not comply with the stipulations of the treaty. Chile argued that the area was south of the course of the Sama River, which was the northern boundary of the zone under Chilean administration according to the treaty. The area was incorporated into the province as a department, with Peru following a policy of non-recognition. Around this time, there were claims of military escalation, including claims of Peruvian troops mobilizing near the Chilean border, which were denied by the Peruvian government. The department was abolished under Arturo Alessandri's administration by law No. 3,802 on September 22, 1921.

In 1925, Coolidge ruled that the province of Tarata was not included in the provisions of the Treaty of Ancón. In Peru, a commission was formed to define the boundaries of Tarata. The commission was chaired by Minister Raúl Porras Barrenechea and Commander Oscar Ordóñez. On September 1, 1925, at exactly 10 am, Chile handed over Tarata to Peru in a ceremony that took place in the main square, with representatives from both countries present: with Agustín Edwards Budge representing Chile, Manuel de Freyre y Santander representing Peru, and General Pershing representing the United States.

==== Arbitration by John J. Pershing ====
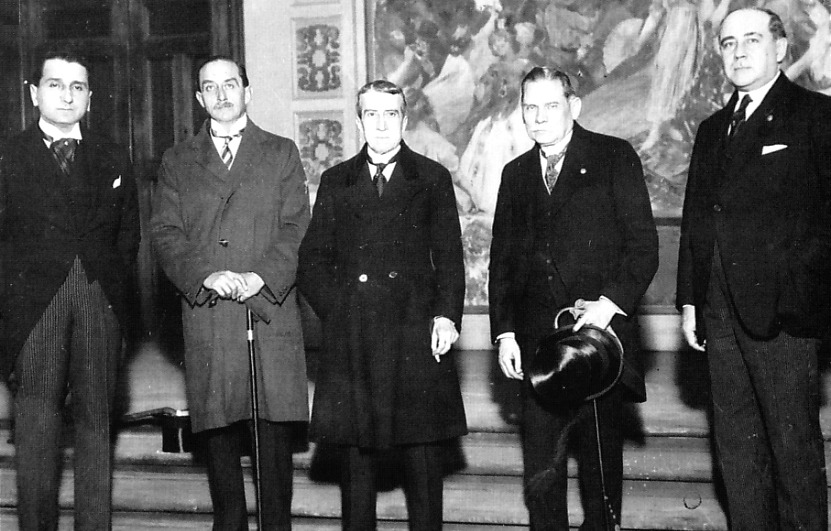
The Peruvian delegation in 1925. (Note: From left to right: Alberto Salomón Osorio (delegate), Manuel de Freyre y Santander (delegate), Augusto B. Leguía (president of Peru), César Elguera (Foreign Minister), and Anselmo Barreto (delegate).)

On March 4, 1925, the plebiscitary commission was created, composed of Manuel de Freyre y Santander for Peru, Agustín Edwards Mac-Clure for Chile, and John J. Pershing for the United States.

In Lima, members of the Tacna, Arica, and Tarapacá Youth Society, led by Carlos Jiménez Correa, José Jiménez Borja, and Jorge Basadre, published documents on the legal aspects of the plebiscite. The Peruvian plebiscite commission resided aboard the steamer Ucayali, which was anchored off the port of Arica. The newspaper La Voz del Sur (a supplement to La Prensa, a newspaper of Lima) was also published on board the ship. Also present in the port were the American ship Rochester and the Chilean warships O'Higgins and Condell.

The Chilean plebiscite campaign was led by Luis Barceló Lira, General Fernández Pradel, and the very active Bishop Rafael Edwards. In high schools, Peruvian students were forced to wear a Chilean cockade and sing the Chilean national anthem. Chilean propaganda was disseminated by the newspaper El Pacífico and pamphlets such as El Ajicito, El Morro, El Roto, El Corvo, and El Plebiscito.

At that time, there were four times as many Chilean police and soldiers as two years prior. Since August 1925, hotels had been required to submit their guest lists to the Chilean police, and Peruvians needed a permit card to move around the area. Peruvians and Americans were monitored by Chilean agents. A Chilean paramilitary group known as Los Mazorqueros established their headquarters in Tacna, Para, Pachía, Pocollay, Piedra Blanca, Cerro Blanco, Calientes, and Arica. Peruvians were expelled, and a black cross was painted on their houses. Some businesses refused to sell products to Peruvians. Peruvian patriotic celebrations were prohibited in Tacna and Arica, but not those of other foreigners, such as the Italians. While the Peruvian commission was in Tacna, Commander Óscar Ordóñez ordered the celebration of Saint Rose's Day on August 28, 1925, with a mass and the raising of the Peruvian flag. The event was known throughout the region, and the Peruvian population attended this ceremony, which had not been held since 1901. On October 21, 1925, Agustín Edwards wrote to the Chilean chancellor that if the plebiscite were to take place in the current situation, they would have 800 votes in Arica and 400 votes in Tacna.

The Peruvian population channeled their complaints of intimidation, disappearances, and deportations through Manuel Portocarrero. Portocarrero brought these complaints to the commission. In January 1925, General Pershing reported to the Plebiscite Commission that 710 Peruvians had been deported, including those aboard the British ship Ebro, which sent them south of Arica. On June 2, 1926, U.S. Ambassador William Collier received information that 250 Peruvians from Tacna and Arica were living in Santiago, having been forced to join the Chilean army against their will. Intimidation led others to seek asylum aboard the Ucayali, at the Border Delegation in Bolivia, or north of the Sama River in Peru. This situation led the US delegates to create a committee to receive and investigate the complaints and to declare that they would not support an irregular plebiscite. Secretary of State Frank B. Kellogg asked Pershing not to postpone the plebiscite and to hold it even under imperfect conditions. Pershing decided not to endorse the plebiscite and requested his resignation. He departed from Arica on January 27, 1926.

Among the military elements stationed in Arica...(some) obeyed solely and exclusively the direct inspirations of a corps in Santiago [...]. If repeated orders and instructions from the Plebiscite Commission had been followed by these recalcitrant individuals, neither General Pershing nor General Lassiter would have had any reason to declare that the prevailing conditions in Tacna and Arica did not permit the holding of a free and fair plebiscite.

— Agustín Edwards

==== Arbitration by William Lassiter ====
General Lassiter arrived in the area on February 1, 1926.

On January 6, 1926, 30 repatriated residents of Tacna arrived and were attacked by 250 Chileans in full view of 12 police officers. At the train station, Dr. Emilio F. Valverde and Navy Chief Carlos Rotalde were attacked. Those responsible were not punished by the Chilean judge Anguita. On March 5, 1926, in Tacna, the Peruvian propaganda committee held its first parade with the flag and the national anthem of Peru. At the corner of the train tracks and Dos de Mayo Street, they were attacked by Chileans, resulting in 75 injuries. The parade continued along San Martín Street.

The events of January 6th were particularly serious. A very heavy responsibility for them falls on certain police officers, who even then appeared to be linked to the group that, once in power, granted them so much authority and so many opportunities to display their talents [...]. In the disturbances of March 5th, the hand of the group that pursued its own policies, following the inspirations of the Santiago conspirators, was more subtly apparent [...]. At the very least, there is grounds to assert that the immediate perpetrators of the disturbances that day had their support and were their instruments.

— Agustín Edwards

Registration began on March 27. Contrary to the efforts of delegate Agustín Edwards to hold the plebiscite, the Chilean government met with the U.S. delegation to delay it. Furthermore, the Chilean Congress criticized Edwards' pro-plebiscite work.

The violence against Peruvians continued. On May 14, lawyers, including Jorge Basadre, were attacked in Arica. On the 22nd, violence erupted in Tacna. On the 29th, the Peruvian Manuel Espinoza Cuéllar was assassinated. Lassiter requested a postponement of the final agreement, arguing that the governments were negotiating a settlement outside of the plebiscite. Peruvian voters had stopped registering to vote in the plebiscite. Registration was extended until May 21. On June 9, Agustín Edwards requested that the vote proceed regardless. US delegates Henry Stimson, William Dennis, and Charles Hughes then declared that holding the plebiscite under these circumstances would be fraudulent. On June 15, 1926, General Lassiter signed the "Outline of reasons for requiring a definitive termination of the plebiscite proceedings in Tacna and Arica" and declared that it was impossible to hold the plebiscite since Chile did not guarantee fair conditions for the Peruvian vote in Tacna and Arica. The committee approved Lassiter's motion.

In response to this statement, Lassiter was heckled by the Chileans, and Agustín Edwards did not attend the commission's sessions. The Chilean police refused to open the doors of the commission's headquarters, so Lassiter had to use a nearby office. On June 21, Lassiter left the area, returning to his country aboard the ship Galveston. The Peruvian commission that had been established withdrew on July 25 aboard the ship Ebro. To avoid reprisals, 2,200 Peruvians left Tacna and Arica and departed for Callao on various ships.

=== Treaty of Lima ===
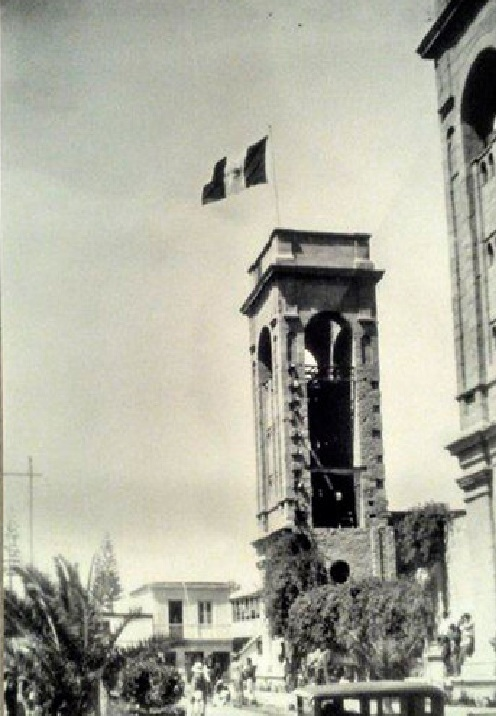
The flag of Peru flies over the Tacna Cathedral during the handover.

On April 20, 1926, Ambassador William Collier informed Chile that Peru should exercise sovereignty over Tacna and Arica, as Chile had not complied with Article 3 of the Treaty of Ancón. On June 7, 1926, members of the U.S. delegation declared that the arbitration award was erroneous. On August 27, 1926, Secretary Kellogg and property expert Wade H. Ellis proposed to Peru and Chile a division of the disputed territory, with the area north of the Arica–La Paz railway going to Peru and the remainder divided between Chile and Bolivia. If this proposal was not accepted, a new arbitration process would be initiated under President Coolidge. If this arbitration also failed, the United States would withdraw from the case. In discussions between President Leguía and Foreign Minister Figueroa, the territorial division proposal was prepared.

Thus in 1929, an agreement was reached through the signing of the Treaty Treaty of Lima on June 3. The document was signed by then Peruvian Representative Pedro José Rada y Gamio and Chilean Representative Emiliano Figueroa Larraín, leading to the effective return of Tacna to Peru at midnight, on the 28th of August 1929, while Arica (both the former Chilean department as well as some territory of Tacna ceded by the treaty) was permanently given to Chile, being integrated into the Tarapacá Province, ending the existence of the Chilean province of Tacna.

The handover had no official ceremony, with some Chilean officials temporarily staying behind to assist Peru regarding the new administration. Nonetheless, the return of the territory was met with celebrations in Peru, with President Augusto B. Leguía overseeing a military parade in Lima, and church bells ringing in celebration. Some Chilean citizens, who had remained in the province after the handover asked to be repatriated.

== Continuation ==
Despite the border conflict being officially over, controversy would continue among nationals of both Peru and Bolivia, the latter of which would continue condemning the loss of the Litoral Department, seeking once again a connection to the ocean with the assistance of international mediators on the issue which is yet to be solved, and continues to this day.

=== Charaña Accords ===
Pinochet's proposed corridor

In 1975, the Chilean government of Augusto Pinochet made a proposal to Bolivia consisting in a swap of a narrow continuous corridor of Chilean land from the sea to the border between Chile and Bolivia, running parallel to the border between Chile and Peru, making the Lluta River Chile's northern border, in exchange for the same amount of Bolivian territory. The proposal, known as the Charaña Accords, involved former Peruvian land and according to the Treaty of Ancón, Chile could not give former Peruvian territories to other nations without Peru's agreement. Then dictator of Peru Francisco Morales-Bermúdez was opposed to these changes but proposed to make Arica a territory governed by the three states. Chile responded that it could not accept this complicated shared sovereignty.

Since Pinochet was likely aware that the Charaña proposals would fail in the end due to Peruvian opposition, legal and political analysts have suggested that he raised them just as a gesture towards Bolivia. Around the same time, from 1968 to 1980, President Juan Velasco Alvarado once again referred to Arica and Tarapacá with the term captive provinces.

=== Maritime dispute ===
The disputed area (left) and the boundary as per the ICJ ruling (right)

The maritime dispute between Chile and Peru concerned the sovereignty of an area in the Pacific Ocean approximately 37,900 square kilometres (14,600 sq mi) in size. Peru contended that its maritime boundary delimitation with Chile was not fixed, but Chile claimed that it holds no outstanding border issues with Peru. On January 16, 2008, Peru brought forth the case to the International Court of Justice at The Hague, the Netherlands, which accepted the case and formally filed it as the Case concerning maritime delimitation between the Republic of Peru and the Republic of Chile – Perú v. Chile.

The issue was first addressed in the 1980s by the then Foreign Minister of Peru, Allan Wagner, with the Minister of Foreign Affairs of Chile at the time, Jaime del Valle. The following year, the Peruvian Ambassador Juan Miguel Bákula Patiño had an interview with Foreign Minister Jaime del Valle on this matter, and handled a diplomatic note, dated May 23, 1986, known as the Bákula Memorandum (Spanish: Memorándum Bákula). The document proposed the negotiation of maritime boundaries, supporting the Peruvian position that Chile and Peru had never signed a treaty that would delimit the maritime boundary between the two countries.

On January 27, 2014, the court ruled in favor of Peru. Under the ruling, Chile lost control over part of its formerly claimed maritime territory and ceded additional maritime territory to Peru. The ruling was met with criticism in Chile, with several figures criticizing the government's handling of the case.

=== Punto Concordia dispute ===
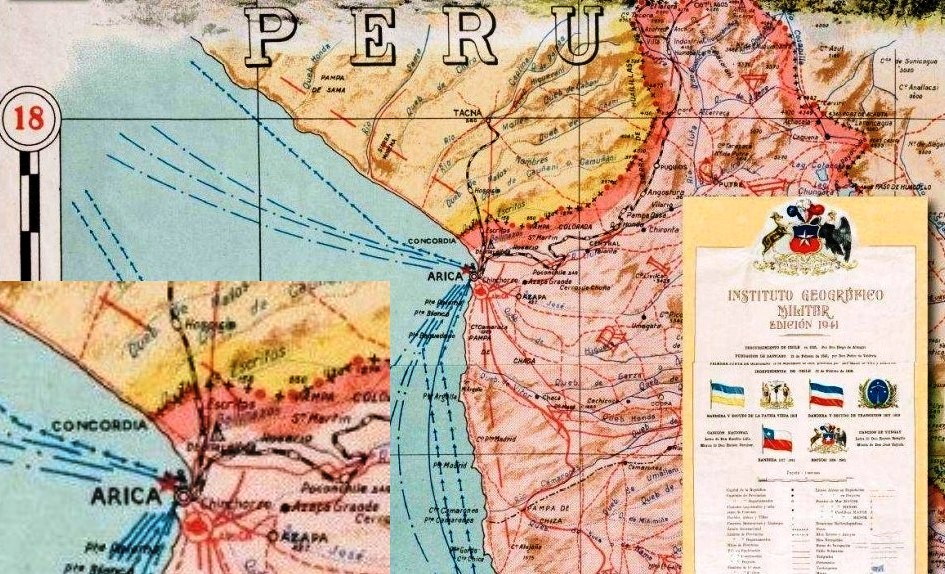
1941 Chilean map of the border area labelling the border point as 'CONCORDIA'.

A dispute regarding a milestone known as Milestone 1 or Concordia Point (Spanish: Hito 1 / Punto Concordia) and the area it establishes, known as the land triangle (Spanish: triángulo terrestre), was revived as a result of the ICJ ruling, due to the disagreement on where the new maritime border was to begin. The dispute consists of a bilateral disagreement on the exact location of the milestone, as both Chile (Note: See coordinates 18°21′03″S 70°22′56″W.) and Peru (Note: See coordinates 18°21′08″S 70°22′39″W.) have different locations for the exact placement. Both countries also claim to patrol the area, the former with the Quebrada de Escritos observation point and the latter with the Francisco Bolognesi outpost.

The milestones were first established by a border commission in 1930, 180 meters away from the coast (Note: See coordinates 18°21′03″S 70°22′56″W.) In the 1950s, maritime-related treaties and documents were signed by both countries: Ecuador, Chile and Peru in 1952 and 1954, and Peru in 1955. Several inconsistencies regarding the exact placement of the border and is continuity with the maritime border led to a notification sent from Peru to United Nations Secretary-General Kofi Annan in 2000. In 2001, several incidents occurred: a Chilean outpost was established in the disputed area, which led to controversy and protests by and was eventually removed by Chile "exclusively for the purpose of keeping the peace in the border area." On another occasion, a lighthouse in the area was destroyed by the 2001 southern Peru earthquake, with debris falling into the disputed area. After Peruvian authorities cleared the debris, the Chilean government alluded that Peru had entered Chilean territory without proper authorization.

A law was passed in Peru in 2005 which led to more controversy, and the dispute reached the United Nations a second time in 2007. During this time, both countries established subdivisions that made reference to the disputed area.

With the 2014 ruling, the ICJ clarified that it was not authorized to establish the exact location of Punto Concordia, and noted that the border established by the court had a possibility to not match said location, but that such a situation was to be coordinated by both parties to the dispute. Both parties subsequently argued this section of the ruling in their favor, with the maritime part of dispute solved, but the terrestrial part continuing.

Peru established the La Yarada-Los Palos District in 2015, with its borders once again alluding to the disputed area. Chile protested against the law, and declared it null and void in the context of the border between both states.

== See also ==
- Bolivian–Chilean territorial dispute
- Bolivian–Peruvian territorial dispute
- Colombian–Peruvian territorial dispute
- Ecuadorian–Peruvian territorial dispute
