= Rómulo Cúneo y Vidal =

Peruvian intellectual (1856–1931)

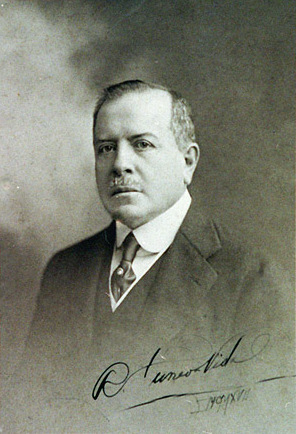

Consul of Peru in Antofagasta
- In office 1903–1908

Personal details
- Born: June 24, 1856 Arica, Arica, Peru
- Died: April 24, 1931 (aged 74) La Punta, Callao, Peru
- Education: Istituto Tecnico Superiore; École pratique des hautes études
- Occupation: Historian, writer, diplomat
- Affiliations: Club Nacional
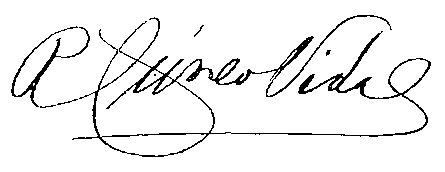
- Signature
- Nickname: Juan Pagador

Juan Rómulo Cúneo y Vidal (Arica; June 24, 1856 — Callao; April 24, 1931) was a Peruvian intellectual, historian, writer and diplomat. As Juan Pagador, he wrote books about Peruvian history, literature, biography, toponymy and heraldry. In addition to his native Spanish, he was also fluent in Quechua, Aymara, French, Greek, Italian, and English.

He served as Peru's consul to the Chilean city of Antofagasta from 1903 to 1908. During the Chilean–Peruvian territorial dispute, he campaigned for the return of the provinces of Tacna and Arica to Peru through commercial and diplomatic means.

== Biography ==
Cúneo was born in Arica, where he was baptised at the Parish of Saint Mark by priest Felipe Mazuelos. His parents were Luis Cúneo and Rosario Vidal, while his godfather was Juan Vaccaro. His early studies took place at both Arica and Tacna. In 1864, he travelled to Europe, where he studied at Milan's Istituto Tecnico Superiore and at the École pratique des hautes études in Paris.

He returned to Peru in 1881, by which point his birthplace was under military occupation by Chile following a land campaign during the ongoing War of the Pacific. He nevertheless moved to the city, where he edited in 1882 the pro-Peruvian newspaper Los Andes, among other publications. He married Elisa Harrison. In 1893, Tacna was the site of Constancia y Concordia, a Masonic lodge presided over by Cúneo that worked to preserve Peruvian values in the then disputed territories. In 1904, the lodge integrated the members of Fraternidad Universal and Morro de Arica, two other lodges from Arica.

He served as consul of Peru in Antofagasta, also representing Bolivia, from 1903 to 1908. He actively worked as a trader and later served as commercial attaché at Peru's legations in London (1908–1909) and Rome (1909–1911). He returned to Peru, establishing himself in Lima, where he dedicated himself to historical studies.

He participated in the plebiscitary campaigns of 1925 and 1926, campaigning for the return of Tacna and Arica to Peru. Following the 1929 Treaty of Lima, he said about Arica that "Half of [his] heart has been ripped out... but let's trust in the future" (referencing its formal incorporation into Chile). Regarding Tacna, which was reincorporated to Peru, he said that "Peru has a debt with this small fatherland," referring to the province as the "small Athens of America."

His historical articles were published in the bulletin of Geographic Society, the Revista Histórica, and in El Comercio. His works appeared in other publications, under the pseudonym of Juan Pagador.

During his later life, he lived in La Punta, a seaside spa in Callao.

== Works ==
Unpublished works by Cúneo include El monstruo e Hijas de virreyes (novel), Atahualpa (a historical drama in two parts), Víctor G. Mantilla, un poeta de los días del cautiverio and En pleno azur, libro de los diálogos del almo Perú.

=== Literary works ===
- Pagadorianas. La mujer en la literatura (1892)
- España. Impresiones de un sudamericano (1911)
- Cristóbal Colón, genovés (1921)
- Tierra Santa (1925)

=== Historiographic works ===
- Historia de las insurrecciones de Tacna por la independencia del Perú (1921, 1977)
- Vida del conquistador Francisco Pizarro y de sus hermanos (1931, 1977)
- Historia de la fundación de la ciudad de San Marcos de Arica (1977)
- Historia de los antiguos cacicazgos hereditarios del Perú (1977)
- Tradiciones y leyendas de Arica, Tarapacá y Atacama (1977)
- Precursores y mártires de la Independencia del Perú (1977)
- Enciclopedia incana (1977)
- Diccionario histórico-biográfico del sur del Perú (1977)

== See also ==
- Chilean–Peruvian territorial dispute
- Jorge Basadre
