= Gerardo Vargas Hurtado =

Peruvian journalist (1869–1941)

- Born: 1869; Arica, Peru
- Died: November 30, 1941; San Isidro, Lima, Peru
- Occupations: Journalist, author
- Known for: Lifetime work related to Arica
- Notable work: El Ariqueño; El Morro de Arica; Historia de Arica; Unanue, sabio ariqueño; La Batalla de Arica

Gerardo Vargas Hurtado (1869–1941) was a Peruvian journalist born in Arica. He was also a playwright, historian, founder of the newspaper El Ariqueño and a journalist of the newspaper El Morro de Arica published until 1911.

== Biography ==
Vargas was born in Arica to Miguel Vargas and Raymunda Hurtado, when the city was part of the Arica Province of Peru.

He was the founder of the newspaper El Ariqueño and a journalist for the newspaper El Morro de Arica which was published until 1911. He was a member of the Geographical Society of Lima. In 1896 he was elected secretary of the Peruvian Universal Fraternity lodge of Arica.

In March 1904, on the occasion of the 14th anniversary of El Morro de Arica, Vargas indicated that the newspaper was founded with the exclusive purpose of defending Peruvian interests in these territories as well as local commerce.

He participated in the journalistic field in the plebiscite campaigns of 1925 and 1926 in favor of Peru for the former provinces (Note: In Peru, Arica and Tacna were administered as provinces of Moquegua Department, while in Chile, they were administered as departments (former administrative divisions) of the Province of Tacna.) of Tacna and Arica to rejoin Peruvian territory. In 1925, some chapters of his book La Batalla de Arica, were published aboard the Ucayali, a Peruvian ship off the Arican coast. In 1929, as a result of the Treaty of Lima, his native Arica became definitively a Chilean province.

== See also ==
- Arica Province (Peru)
- Tacna Province (Chile)
- Treaty of Ancón
- Treaty of Lima
- War of the Pacific
