= Camarones =

Camarones is the plural Spanish form of camarón, meaning "shrimp", and may refer to several places:

- Camarones, Chubut, a town in Argentina
- Camarones, Chile, a commune in Chile
  - Caleta Camarones, a town in the commune
- Camarones, Guaynabo, Puerto Rico, barrio of Puerto Rico
- Camarones metro station, a metro station in Mexico City
