= Francisco Ibáñez (footballer, born 1986) =

Chilean footballer

Personal information
- Full name: Francisco Javier Ibáñez Campos
- Date of birth: 13 January 1986 (age 40)
- Place of birth: Santiago, Chile
- Height: 1.79 m (5 ft 10 in)
- Position: Forward

Youth career
- Universidad de Chile

Senior career*
| Years | Team | Apps | (Gls) |
| 2006–2009 | Palestino | 73 | (18) |
| 2007 | → Deportes Temuco (loan) | 6 | (0) |
| 2010 | O'Higgins | 8 | (2) |
| 2011 | Cobreloa | 13 | (0) |
| 2011–2012 | Altamira | 16 | (0) |
| 2012 | Barnechea | 17 | (8) |
| 2013 | San Marcos | 16 | (4) |
| 2013 | Unión La Calera | 7 | (0) |
| 2014–2016 | Deportes Concepción | 38 | (11) |
| 2014–2015 | → Barnechea (loan) | 23 | (7) |
| 2016–2017 | San Marcos | 23 | (3) |
| 2017–2018 | Deportes Copiapó | 30 | (10) |
| 2019 | Deportes Valdivia | 21 | (2) |
| 2024 | Trasandino Socoroma | – | (–) |
| Total | | 291 | (65) |
- * Club domestic league appearances and goals

Francisco Javier Ibáñez Campos (born 13 January 1986) is a former Chilean professional footballer who played as a forward.

== Club career ==
He began his career in the youth system of Universidad de Chile before making his debut in the 2006 with Palestino.

In 2024, Ibáñez coincided with the former professional players Juan Oviedo, Michael Silva and Juan López in Trasandino from Socoroma.
