= Juan Oviedo (footballer) =

Argentine footballer (born 1993)

Personal information
- Full name: Juan Carlos Oviedo
- Date of birth: 30 April 1993 (age 33)
- Place of birth: Buenos Aires, Argentina
- Height: 1.80 m (5 ft 11 in)
- Position: Forward

Youth career
- Belgrano
- 2012–2013: San Marcos

Senior career*
Years	Team	Apps	(Gls)
2013–2017	San Marcos	26	(2)
2016	→ Ñublense (loan)	6	(0)
2023	Trasandino Socoroma	–	(–)
- * Club domestic league appearances and goals

Juan Carlos Oviedo (born 30 April 1993) is a former Argentine professional footballer who played as a forward.

== Career ==
Born in Argentina, Oviedo developed his career in Chile. A product of Belgrano, he came to San Marcos de Arica in 2012 and played for the first team from 2013 to 2017. In the first half of 2016, he had a stint on loan with Ñublense.

As a player of Trasandino from Socoroma, Oviedo took part in the 2023 Copa Chile. The next year, he continued with them, coinciding with the former professional players Francisco Ibáñez, Michael Silva and Juan López.
