= Eupithecia tarapaca =

Scientific classification
- Kingdom: Animalia
- Phylum: Arthropoda
- Class: Insecta
- Order: Lepidoptera
- Family: Geometridae
- Genus: Eupithecia
- Species: E. tarapaca

Binomial name
- Eupithecia tarapaca Rindge, 1989

Synonyms
- Eupithecia taracapa Rindge, 1987

Species of moth

Eupithecia tarapaca is a moth in the family Geometridae first described by Rindge in 1989. It is found in the region of Taracap'a in Arica Province, Chile. The habitat consists of either the Northern Desert or the Northern Andean Cordillera Biotic Provinces.

The length of the forewings is about 9 mm for males. Adults have been recorded on wing in November.

== Etymology ==
The specific name is based on the type locality.
