= Chilean occupation of Peru =

Military occupation of Peru (1879–1883)

Peruvian Republic República Peruana (Spanish)
- 1879–1883
- Top: Chilean occupation (de facto); Bottom: Peruvian puppet government (de jure) Coat of arms

- Peru in 1881: The territory outside of Lima and the south was nominally administered by the collaborationist government of Miguel Iglesias.; From November 2, 1879 onwards, the Peruvian territories of Tacna, Arica and Tarapacá were under the absolute control of the administration of the Chilean Army.; From January 17, 1881 onwards, the department of Lima was under the absolute control of the administration of the Chilean Army.; The maritime space and the Peruvian islands such as the Lobos de Afuera and Lobos de Tierra islands remained under the administration of the Chilean Navy.; Tarapacá, Tacna and Arica would remain occupied until the treaties of Ancón (1883) and Lima (1929).
- Status: Military occupation by Chile
- Capital: Lima (Note: Location of the Chilean administration (1881–83) and the collaborationist government in La Magdalena (1881).) (1881–1883); Cajamarca (Note: Location of Miguel Iglesias' collaborationist government.) (1881–1884)
- President (of Chile)
  - 1879–1881: Aníbal Pinto
  - 1881–1883: Domingo Santa María
- President (of Peru)
  - 1881: Francisco García Calderón
  - 1881–1883: Lizardo Montero
  - 1883–1885: Miguel Iglesias
- Commander in Chief of the Occupation Forces
  - 1881: Cornelio Saavedra
  - 1881: Pedro Lagos
  - 1881–1883: Patricio Lynch
- History
  - Tarapacá campaign: 2 November 1879
  - Treaty of Ancón: 23 October 1883
  - Chilean withdrawal: 29 October 1883
Preceded by	Succeeded by
Peru	Peru
- Today part of: Chile; Peru

The Chilean occupation of Peru (Spanish: Ocupación chilena del Perú) began on November 2, 1879, with the Tarapacá campaign during the War of the Pacific. The Chilean Army defeated the Peruvian Army and occupied the southern Peruvian territories of Tarapacá, Arica and Tacna. By January 1881, the Chilean Army had reached the Peruvian capital, Lima, and on January 17 of the same year, the occupation of Lima began.

During the occupation of Lima, a collaborationist government was established in La Magdalena, known as the Government of La Magdalena (Spanish: Gobierno de La Magdalena), headed by Francisco García Calderón, that served as the representative government of Peru in order to negotiate the end of the war. After García Calderón's refusal to agree to the territorial transfer of Tarapacá, Arica, and Tacna, he was exiled to Chile along with his wife, where he was pressured again until Lizardo Montero's Cry of Montán, and the establishment of his new government in Cajamarca, known as the Regenerator Government (Spanish: Gobierno Regenerador), which would be recognized as the successor of García Calderón's government by Chile.

The occupation came to an end after the signing of the Treaty of Ancón on October 23, 1883, with Chilean troops retreating on October 29. However, Chilean forces continued to occupy and administer Tarata until 1925, while a final agreement between the two countries regarding Tacna and Arica was reached in 1929.

== Background ==
On April 5, 1879, a state of war was officially declared between Peru and Chile, starting military confrontations between both states. Due to Bolivia's loss of its Litoral Department by the occupying Chilean forces and consequent loss of access to the Pacific Ocean, on March 26, 1879, Hilarión Daza formally offered letters of marque to any ships willing to fight for Bolivia. Despite this, the Chilean navy carried out a successful naval campaign against Peru, which guaranteed her control over the seas.

== Occupation ==
=== Southern Peru ===
The Tarapacá campaign began in the early hours of November 2, 1879. A maritime bombing and subsequent landing at Pisagua proved successful for the Chilean troops, who quickly occupied the town and set it as their base from which to continue the invasion up north. Peruvian General Juan Buendía, who was in command of the Allied Southern Army at Tarapacá, was left in a difficult position. Pisagua and Iquique were his communication lines, and since May, Iquique was under blockade. The liberation of Pisagua then became his main objective. Buendía left Iquique on November 5, moving to Agua Santa, where his forces were to reunite. From here he marched to Porvenir, prior to moving north to join with Hilarión Daza. The Chilean advance had proven successful, however, as Peruvian troops and Chilean troops soon saw themselves fighting on November 19, in the Battle of San Francisco.

As a result of the aforementioned battle, both sides had taken heavy casualties, and the Peruvian troops had soon retreated to nearby Tarapacá. The Chilean advance continued, however, and fighting resumed in the Battle of Tarapacá, where the defending troops saw themselves victorious, and the Chilean troops were forced to retreat. The victory, however, had no effect on the general campaign. The Allies left Tarapacá, withdrawing north-west to Arica on the coast, moving through the area close to the mountains to avoid the Chilean cavalry attack. They marched during twenty days at the cost of six casualties. Therefore, despite the defeat, Chile secured Tarapacá. This occupation of the southern provinces of the country were successful in that Chile was able to carry out its plans of using them as leverage against the Peruvian government during the war, with most of the territory being awarded to Chile, while Tacna was, almost in its entirety, returned to Peru.

=== Lima ===
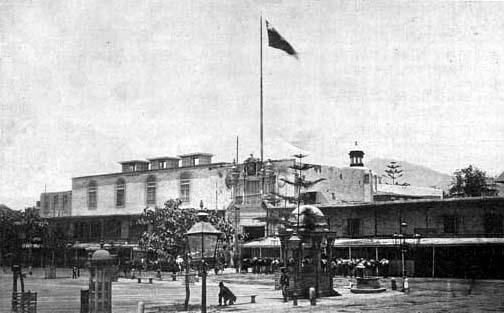
Government Palace during the occupation in 1881

After the success in Tarapacá and the Lynch Expedition in the north of Peru, a campaign to take Lima began in late 1880, with amphibious landings taking place along the Peruvian coast. By early 1881, fighting had reached the outskirts of the capital, and after the Chilean success at Chorrillos and Miraflores, the occupation of Lima began in January 1881, with Chilean troops occupying the capital and establishing a military administration headquartered in the Government Palace, while the collaborationist government was headquartered in the Palacio de la Magdalena.

Reports of Chilean destruction and looting resulted in a meeting between the different observing powers, concluding that such an event would not be allowed in Lima proper. Had the Chilean army destroyed and looted the city as it had done in Barranco, Chorrillos and Miraflores, the observing powers would have used their military power in the form of a bombardment of the city against the occupying army.

Despite a relatively peaceful administration in comparison to the destruction in Barranco, Chorrillos and Miraflores, the city of Lima was looted by Chilean forces, such as in the case of the National Library of Peru. After the occupation, Chile diverted part of its war efforts to crush Mapuche resistance in the south, with some of its equipment captured from Peruvian troops, as well as civilians. Chilean troops coming from Peru entered Araucanía where they in 1881 defeated the last major Mapuche uprising.

== Government ==
In absence of a Peruvian President who was willing to accept their peace terms, the Chilean Army established a collaborationist government to serve as the nominal representative of the Peruvian state. This government's legitimacy was disputed by the Peruvian resistance. The movement itself was mainly headed by Nicolás de Piérola, who established three armies to counter the Chilean invasion in the north, center and south of the country. Of these armies, only the second, headed by Andrés A. Cáceres and based in Jauja, and the third, headed by de Piérola himself from Jauja and later Ayacucho, managed to organize themselves properly, with de Piérola's army being better organized than Cáceres's improvised army and Lizardo Montero's non-existent army in Cajamarca.

=== La Magdalena ===
On 22 February 1881, the Chileans allowed an open cabildo of notables outside of Lima to elect Francisco García Calderón as president, allowing him to fly the Peruvian flag and coat of arms, and also allowing him to raise and arm two infantry battalions composed of 400 men each, as well as two small cavalry squadrons in order to give more consistency to the provisional government.

At that time, the U.S. Secretary of State, James G. Blaine, who saw the war as an inadmissible intervention of British capital in the America's sphere of influence, outlined a new policy in June 1881 reversing the previous neutrality of the U.S. for a denial of any annexation of territories. On 26 June 1881, the United States recognized President Calderón as President of Peru. Because of Calderón's refusal to accept the Chilean peace conditions, which involved the cession of Tarapacá and Arica to Chile, he was placed under arrest by the Chileans on November 6 and deported to Valparaíso, with Lizardo Montero Flores, who had been appointed as vice president, succeeding him as provisional president of Peru.

Montero initially established his government in Cajamarca, moving to Huaraz in June 1882, and leaving for Arequipa, refusing to accept the Chilean terms for a peace treaty. Before Montero's departure from Cajamarca, he appointed Miguel Iglesias as Military Chief of the North, who proclaimed the Cry of Montán—a manifesto demanding peace with Chile even at the cost of losing territory—on August 31, the same day Montero entered Arequipa. Montero refused to recognize Iglesias's manifesto, and established a parallel government that established itself in Arequipa as a provisional capital for the duration of its occupation, with the city receiving the name Independent Republic of Arequipa (Spanish: República Independiente de Arequipa), which appeared on passports issued at the time. Montero's government ratified García Calderón, by then in Chile, as the de jure constitutional president of Peru, with Montero serving as first vice president and later proclaiming Cáceres as vice president. This government would collaborate with the resistance while continuing to attempt negotiations with Chile, who recognized Iglesias' government.

After the defeat of Cáceres at the Battle of Huamachuco, discussions took place among members of the government at Arequipa. In late 1883, amid civil discontent at the news of the imminent occupation by Chilean troops, Montero left Arequipa for Puno to avoid its destruction, with the city being occupied shortly after. By the time he reached Lake Titicaca, he put Cáceres in charge of the powerless government, who did not exercise power in the end, later recognizing the Treaty of Ancón. After this action, Montero left for Buenos Aires and later Europe.

==== Foreign relations ====
The international community did not recognize the government based in La Magdalena, with very few exceptions.

- Argentine diplomat José E. Uriburu declared that Argentina would "abstain from acting."
- The Bolivian Foreign Ministry refrained from sending diplomats to Lima "until the uncertainty about the true representative of Peru was cleared up." After Montero's government established itself in Arequipa, Campero's government recognized it as legitimate, and assisted the government and the Cáceres' rebel troops with armament bought from Europe and the United States. After Montero's government collapsed, Bolivia recognized Iglesias' government on December 3, 1883.
- Costa Rica recognized and established relations with the Magdalena-based government. Before the occupation of Lima, Costa Rica had sent weapons to the port of Callao, which had been denounced by Chile in 1879, as Costa Rica had declared itself neutral, but was only proven in 1881, leading to a diplomatic incident between both states.
- The Kingdom of Denmark recognized and established relations with the Magdalena-based government.
- El Salvador recognized and established relations with the Magdalena-based government.
- Honduras recognized and established relations with the Magdalena-based government.
- Nicaragua recognized and established relations with the Magdalena-based government.
- Uruguay recognized and established relations with the Magdalena-based government.
- After contact was established with Isaac P. Christiancy, Minister Plenipotentiary to Peru until 1881, relations were established between the United States and the government in La Magdalena, with the former offering to act in favor of Peru in the diplomatic aftermath of the conflict in order to allow the latter to maintain its territorial integrity, as long as it was possible to pay compensation to the occupying power. By 1882, however, American mediation in the conflict turned less in favor of Peru and more in favor of Chile in the aftermath of the assassination of President James A. Garfield.
- Switzerland recognized and established relations with the Magdalena-based government.
- (Venezuela) Venezuelan president Antonio Guzmán Blanco condemned the Chilean invasion and recognized the Ayacucho-based government. He received frigate captain Guillermo L. Pareja as his country's representative in 1882, recognising his credentials and allowing him to work in the country until his duties as minister plenipotentiary ended in 1884.

=== Cajamarca ===
Iglesias assumed command of the northern departments per Montero's instructions, and established a "Free North Government" in Trujillo in July 1882. By then, he was convinced that the peace with Chile was the priority. On August 31, 1882, he issued his Montán Manifesto demanding peace, even at the cost of territorial concessions. He proclaimed himself Supreme Chief, and authorized the start of talks with the Chilean government, also convening an Assembly, known as the Montán Assembly, in northern Peru to obtain his support, which was installed on December 25, 1882.

By law of December 30, the so-called Montán Assembly established the Executive Power with a responsible chief who would preside over it with the name of Regenerative President of the Republic and an equally responsible ministry. On January 1, 1883, the Assembly appointed Iglesias Regenerator President, formally starting the Miguel Iglesias government, officially known as the Regenerator Government of the Peruvian Republic (Spanish: Gobierno Regenerador de la República Peruana).

On January 5, the Assembly granted President Iglesias full powers to try to make peace with Chile. The Assembly was not recognized by neither de Piérola, who had just arrived from Europe, nor Cáceres, nor Montero, nor by the Chileans, who had their doubts about the new regime. On February 9, 1883, Patricio Lynch, head of the occupation forces, received an order from Chilean President Domingo Santa María to reinforce the command of Miguel Iglesias in the north, convinced that with Iglesias he could sign peace according to his interests, and that Montero and García Calderón would not accept any territorial transfer.

On March 31, 1883, Cáceres arrived in Canta and sent Colonel Isaac Recavarren to Huaraz along with the 250-man "Pucará" battalion to organize their troops and then march north to overthrow the Iglesias government. By May 3, 1883, the basis of the Treaty of Ancón was already agreed between Patricio Lynch and Miguel Iglesias, who signed this initial agreement from Cajamarca.

During this period, Spanish diplomats were sent to Lima, where Chile and Spain signed a peace treaty on June 12, ending the state of war that existed between both states since the Chincha Islands War. Prior to the conflict, Peru's opposition to such an action had contributed to tense relations with Chile, with a diplomatic crisis having occurred in 1868.

On July 10, 1883, the battle of Huamachuco took place between Andrés Avelino Cáceres and Alejandro Gorostiaga, with the latter's success over Cáceres' troops. In the aftermath of the battle, Miguel Iglesias celebrated the Chilean victory as its own, sending a special commission to congratulate Gorostiaga on his victory. In this way, Cáceres had been minimized enough not to question his authority, while Montero left Arequipa for Bolivia to avoid the destruction of the city.

== End of the occupation ==
The occupation came to an end after the signing of the Treaty of Ancón on October 23, 1883, with Chilean troops retreating six days later, on October 29. The treaty unconditionally ceded Tarapacá to Chile, while the situation in Tacna and Arica—by then known in Peru as the captive provinces—was to be determined by a plebiscite, which never came to pass.

Peru entered a period known as the National Reconstruction, where the country had to deal with the consequences of war and the reconstruction of the ruined country. Miguel Iglesias' government continued to function as the constitutional government of Peru. During this period, Andrés Avelino Cáceres, who was known as the Hero of Breña by this point, opposed Iglesias and received more popular support than Iglesias' government, eventually leading to the Peruvian Civil War of 1884–1885.

In 1925, the contested Tarata Department was ceded to Peru, while a final agreement between the two countries regarding Tacna and Arica was reached in 1929, with most of Tacna returning to Peru, and Arica being ceded to Chile.

== See also ==
- Chilean occupation of Araucanía
- Bolivian occupation of Peru
- Peruvian occupation of Ecuador
