= Camarones, Chile =

Camarones
- City and Commune
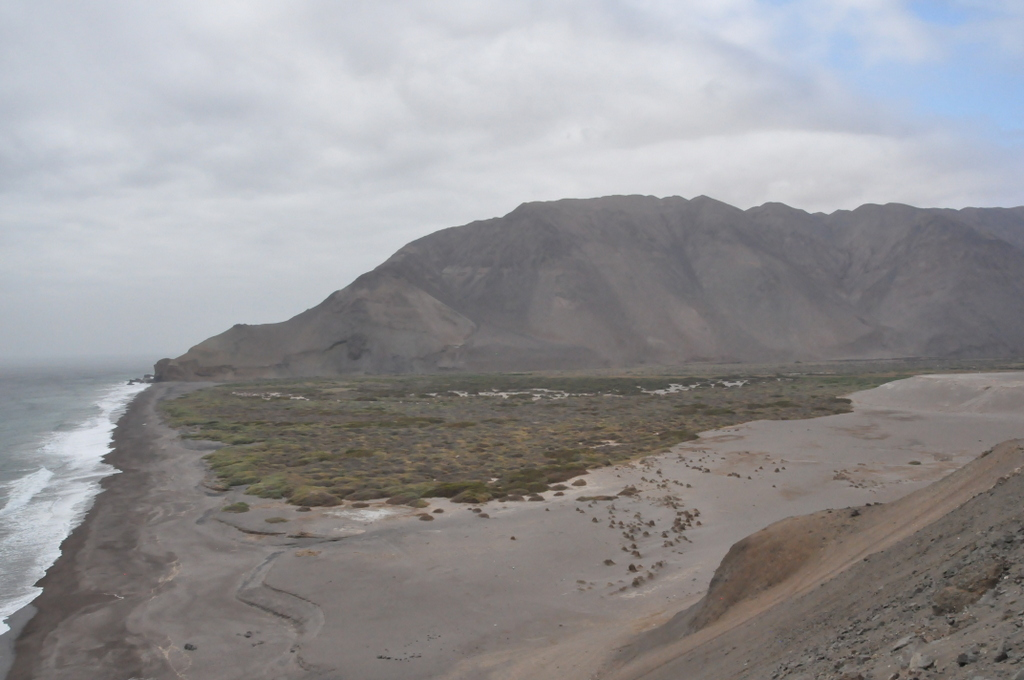
- Caleta Camarones

- Coat of arms Map of Camarones commune in Arica and Parinacota Region Location in Chile
- Coordinates (city): 19°1′S 69°52′W
- Country: Chile
- Region: Arica y Parinacota
- Province: Arica
- Seat: Cuyo

Government
  - Type: Municipality
  - Alcalde: Ivan Martin Romero Menacho

Area
  - Total: 3,927.0 km^{2} (1,516.2 sq mi)
- Elevation: 932 m (3,058 ft)

Population (2012 Census)
  - Total: 606
  - Density: 0.154/km^{2} (0.400/sq mi)
  - Urban: 0
  - Rural: 1,220

Sex
  - Men: 745
  - Women: 475
- Time zone: UTC-4 (CLT)
  - Summer (DST): UTC-3 (CLST)
- Area code: 56 + 58
- Website: Municipality of Camarones

Camarones is a city and commune in the Arica y Parinacota Region in Chile. It forms part of the administrative Arica Province and has a population of 1,220. Its municipality seat is in the town of Cuyo, located next to the Chile Highway 5. Cuyo is the administrative center of the commune and a place of rest for travellers. The main towns are Codpa and Caleta Camarones. The latter is a fishing inlet of only 44 inhabitants. Codpa is the largest town in the commune, located 114 kilometres (71 mi) from the city of Arica. It is an entirely rural commune with almost no tourist activity, and is well known for its uncharted areas. The only Afro-Chilean community in Chile is located in Camarones.

== Demographics ==
According to the 2002 census of the National Statistics Institute, Camarones had 1,220 inhabitants (745 men and 475 women), and it is a rural area. The population grew by 39% (372 persons) between the 1992 and 2002 censuses.

== Administration ==
As a commune, Camarones is a third-level administrative division of Chile administered by a municipal council, headed by an alcalde who is directly elected every four years. The 2008-2012 alcalde is Ivan Martin Romero Menacho.

Within the electoral divisions of Chile, Camarones is represented in the Chamber of Deputies by Mr. Nino Baltolu (UDI) and Mr. Orlando Vargas (PPD) as part of the 1st electoral district, which includes the entire Arica and Parinacota Region. The commune is represented in the Senate by José Miguel Insulza (PS, 2018–2026) and José Durana (UDI, 2018–2026) as part of the 1st senatorial constituency (Arica and Parinacota Region and Tarapacá Region).
