= Máximo Lira =

Maximo Lira
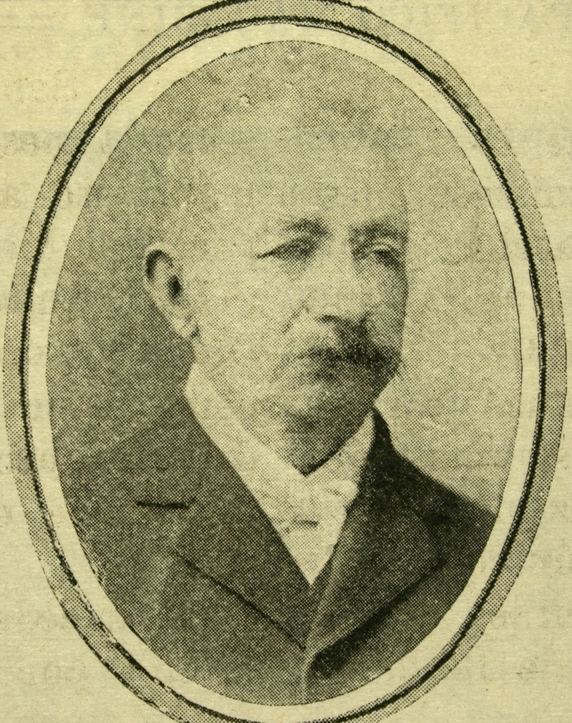

Intendant of Tacna Province
- In office January 1904 – December 31, 1912
- Preceded by: Antonio Subercaseux
- Succeeded by: Eduardo Orrego Ovalle

Plenipotentiary of Chile to Brazil
- In office 1891–1896
- Preceded by: Alejandro Fierro Perez
- Succeeded by: Joaquin Walker Martinez

Personal details
- Born: November 18, 1846 Santiago, Chile
- Died: October 17, 1916 (aged 69) Tacna, Chile (now Tacna, Peru)
- Education: Colegio San Ignacio, Santiago

Máximo Ramón Lira Donoso was a Chilean diplomat and politician who served as the plenipotentiary of Chile to Brazil between 1891 and 1896 and the intendant of Tacna Province between 1904 and 1912.

== Biography ==
Lira was born in Santiago, Chile on November 18, 1846, as the son of Leonardo Lira Donoso and Tomasa Donoso. He married Adela Manso and they had two children. Lira completed his primary and secondary education at Colegio San Ignacio, Santiago de Chile where he received a bachelor's degree. He began his journalism career by translating a novel for El Independiente and published articles favoring the Conservative Party.

In the 1873 Chilean parliamentary election he was elected as a substitute deputy for La Unión between 1873 and 1876. In 1874, Lira served as the secretary at the Chilean legation in Buenos Aires, where he also served as El Independiente's correspondent in the city. In the 1876 parliamentary elections, Lira was re-elected as a substitute deputy, but between 1876 and 1879 was appointed as the deputy for Rancagua.

During the War of the Pacific, Lira was elected as a deputy for Los Andes between 1879 and 1882. In 1879, Lira was appointed as secretary to the general quartermaster of the Chilean Army, Francisco Echaurren Huidobro, and later served as secretary to the Minister of War Rafael Sotomayor. Lira then served as secretary to Manuel Baquedano. Lira was present as the Bombardment of Antofagasta, Battle of Los Angeles, Battle of Tacna, Battle of Arica, Battle of San Juan and Chorrillos, and the Battle of Miraflores. Lira also went on the Mollendo expedition and returned victoriously to Chile.

When the war concluded, Lira served in the Chilean Department of the Interior under Baquedano during the latter's time as president. Lira defended José Manuel Balmaceda who had occupied the post of Undersecretary of the Interior of Chile before Balmaceda's rise to presidency. Between 1885 and 1888, Lira was elected as deputy for Angol. During Balmaceda's presidency, Lira had switched his political affiliation away from the Conservatives and supported a liberal ideology. When the Chilean Civil War of 1891 broke out, Lira joined Congress against Balmaceda and was tasked with seizing control of the Archives of the National Congress of Chile and the National Congress building itself. When Congress took power, Lira was rewarded with becoming the plenipotentiary of Chile to Brazil, Paraguay, Uruguay, and Peru.

In January 1904 he was appointed as intendant of Tacna Province, then under Chilean rule. He served as intendant until 1912. Lira spent the last years of his life in Tacna, dying on October 17, 1916.
