= Caleta Camarones =

Coordinates: 19°11′32″S 70°15′46″W

- Town
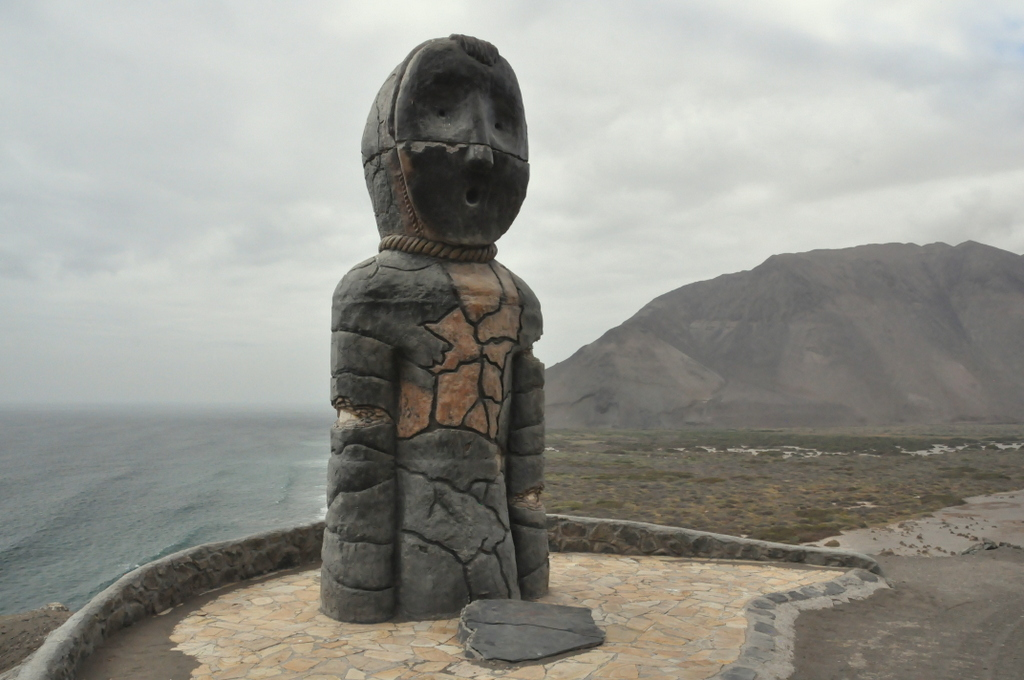
- Interactive map of Caleta Camarones
- Country: Chile
- Region: Arica and Parinacota Region

Caleta Camarones is a town located in the extreme southwest of Arica and Parinacota Region, Chile. This is where the Camarones Valley ends, and where the Camarones River flows to the Pacific Ocean. The main economic activity is fishing.

== Attractions ==
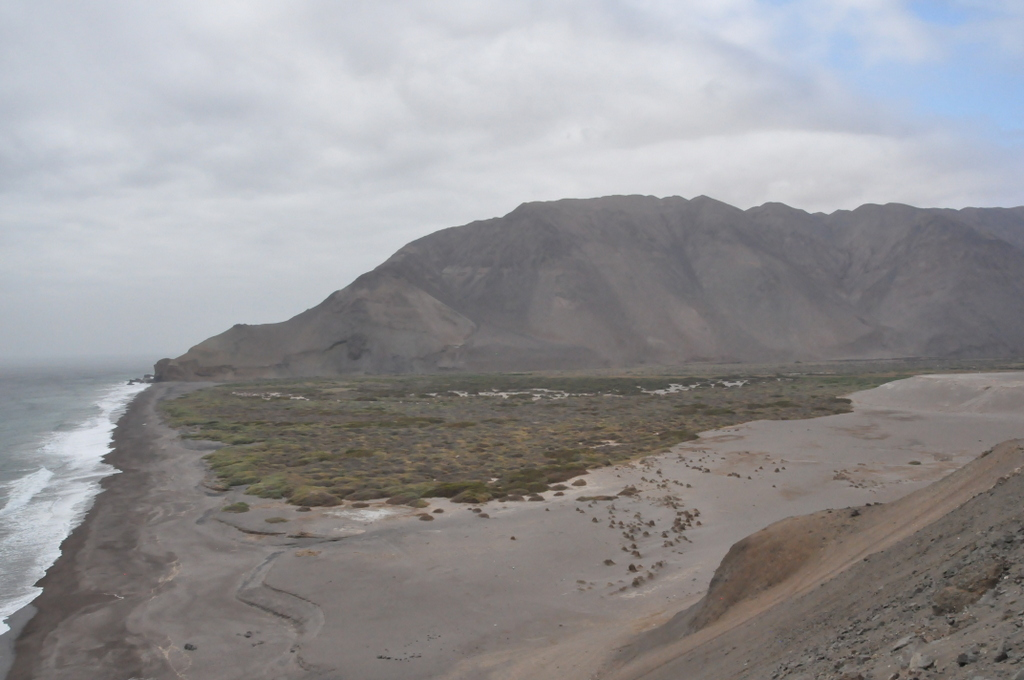
The beach and the wetlands of Caleta Camarones

The beach and the wetlands of Caleta Camarones provide some scenic sights.

In 2010, a monumental sculpture celebrating the Chinchorro Culture was inaugurated in the town as part of the bicentennial of the Chilean Republic. The sculpture is four and a half meters tall and weighs eight tons; it is located in the vicinity of the archaeological sites 'Camarones 14 and 15'. The work was inaugurated by the Mayor, and it aims to celebrate the Chinchorro Culture throughout Chile and worldwide. In 1998, the process started to add Chinchorro culture sites to UNESCO list of the World Heritage of Humanity. The sculpture is the work of the local sculptor Paola Pimentel.
