= Codpa =

Village in the Arica and Parinacota Region, Chile

- Village
- Location in Chile
- Coordinates: 18°50′S 69°44′W
- Country: Chile
- Region: Arica and Parinacota
- Province: Arica
- Commune: Camarones
- Elevation: 1,852 m (6,076 ft)
- Time zone: UTC-4 (CLT)
  - Summer (DST): UTC-3 (CLST)

Codpa (Spanish pronunciation: [ˈkoðpa]) is a village located 114 kilometres (71 mi) to the south of Arica, in the Chilean commune of Camarones in the region of Arica and Parinacota, Chile.

It is located 1,852 metres (6,076 ft) above sea level and in a valley of the same name. It is a small village of Hispanic origin, located in a mountain range with a tempered climate and well-known pure water. Its narrow valley is exceedingly fertile, suitable for most types of fruit trees, particularly guava. Famous for its pintatani wine, Codpa has been the traditional place of rest for Arica. The Church of San Martín de Tours was an important misional center in the Spanish colonization of the Americas. A few miles from Codpa are the petroglyphs at Ofragia. Codpa is an Aymaran word meaning "pedestal".
