= Arica Province =

Arica Province Provincia de Arica
- Province
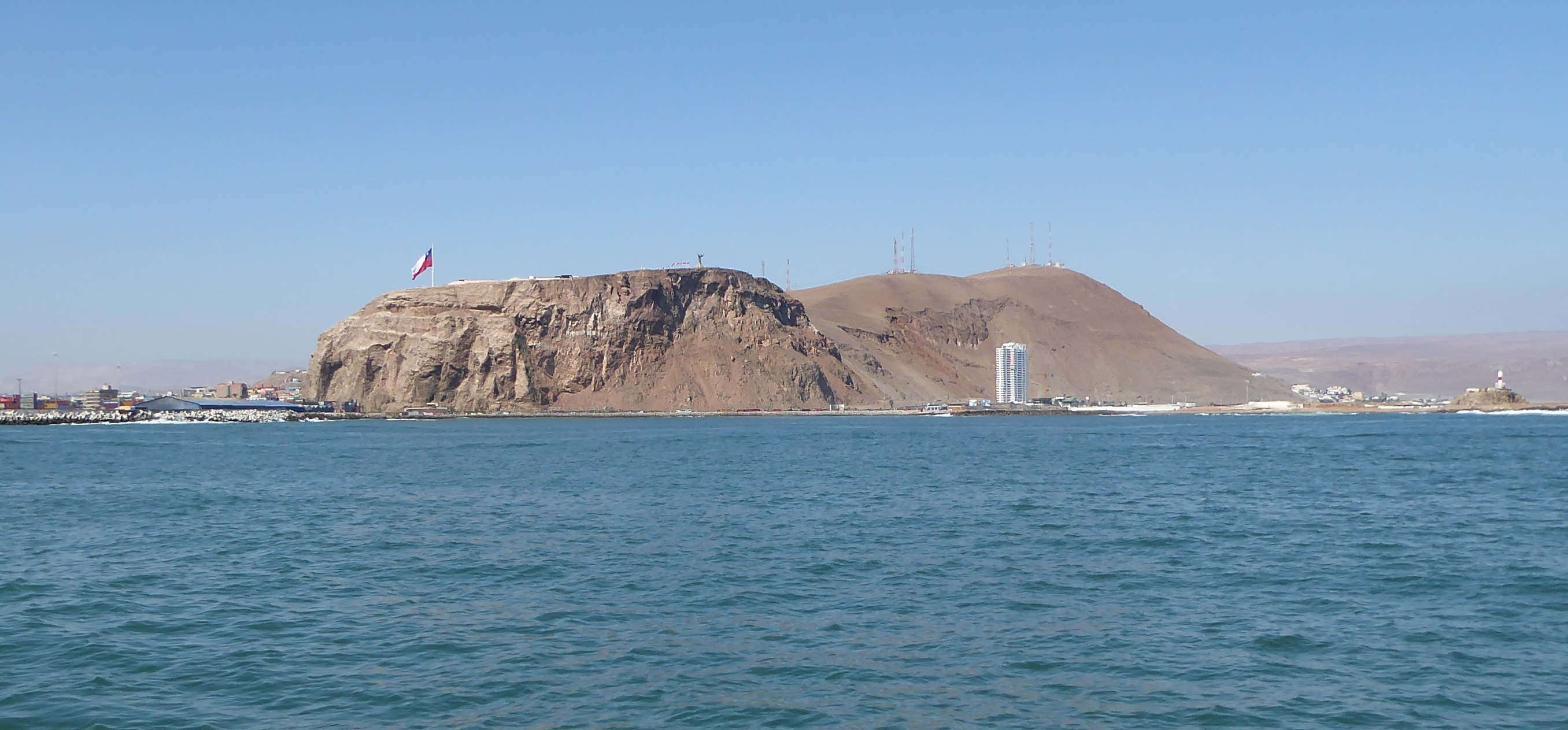
- Morro de Arica

- Flag Seal

- Location in Arica y Parinacota Region

- Location in Chile
- Coordinates: 18°28′30″S 70°18′52″W
- Country: Chile
- Region: Arica y Parinacota
- Established: 26 October 1979
- Capital: Arica
- Communes: Arica; Camarones

Government
  - Type: Provincial
  - Presidential Provincial Delegate: Mirtha Patricia Arancibia Cruz

Area
  - Total: 8,726.4 km^{2} (3,369.3 sq mi)

Population (2002 Census)
  - Total: 186,488
  - Density: 21.371/km^{2} (55.349/sq mi)
  - Urban: 175,441
  - Rural: 11,047

Sex
  - Men: 92,487
  - Women: 94,001
- Time zone: UTC-4 (CLT)
  - Summer (DST): UTC-3 (CLST)
- Area code: 56 + 58
- Website: Official website (in Spanish)

Arica Province (Spanish: Provincia de Arica) is one of two provinces of Chile's northernmost region, Arica y Parinacota. The province is bordered on the north by the Tacna Province of Peru, on the south by the Tamarugal Province in the Tarapacá Region, on the east the Parinacota Province and on the west by the Pacific Ocean. Its capital is the port city of Arica.

== History ==
Founded as Villa de San Marcos de Arica in 1541 on the site of a pre-Columbian settlement, it belonged to Peru until 1879, when it was captured by the Chileans, who gained control of the locality under the Treaty of Ancón (1883). Until 1929, Arica was administered as a department of Tacna, then a province (at the time a first-level administrative division). From 1930 onwards, it formed part of Tarapacá. Following a restructuring of the country's political administration, Tarapacá Region was created in 1974, and a law of 1979 subdivided the regions into provinces, creating two provinces out of the former department of Arica: Arica and Parinacota. In 2007, Arica y Parinacota Region was created.

== Geography and demography ==
According to the 2002 census by the National Statistics Institute (INE), the province spans an area of 8,726.4 km^{2} (3,369 sq mi) and had a population of 186,488 inhabitants (92,487 men and 94,001 women), giving it a population density of 21.4/km^{2} (55/sq mi). Between the 1992 and 2002 censuses, the population grew by 9.5% (16,184 persons).

== Administration ==
As a province, Arica is a second-level administrative division of Chile, consisting of two communes (comunas): Arica in the northern portion and Camarones in the south. The coastal city of Arica serves as the provincial capital. The province is administered by the presidentially appointed regional delegate of Arica y Parinacota.
