= St. Mark's Cathedral, Arica =

Church in Arica, Chile

Coordinates: 18.4790°S 70.3207°W

Saint Mark's Cathedral
- Catedral de San Marcos
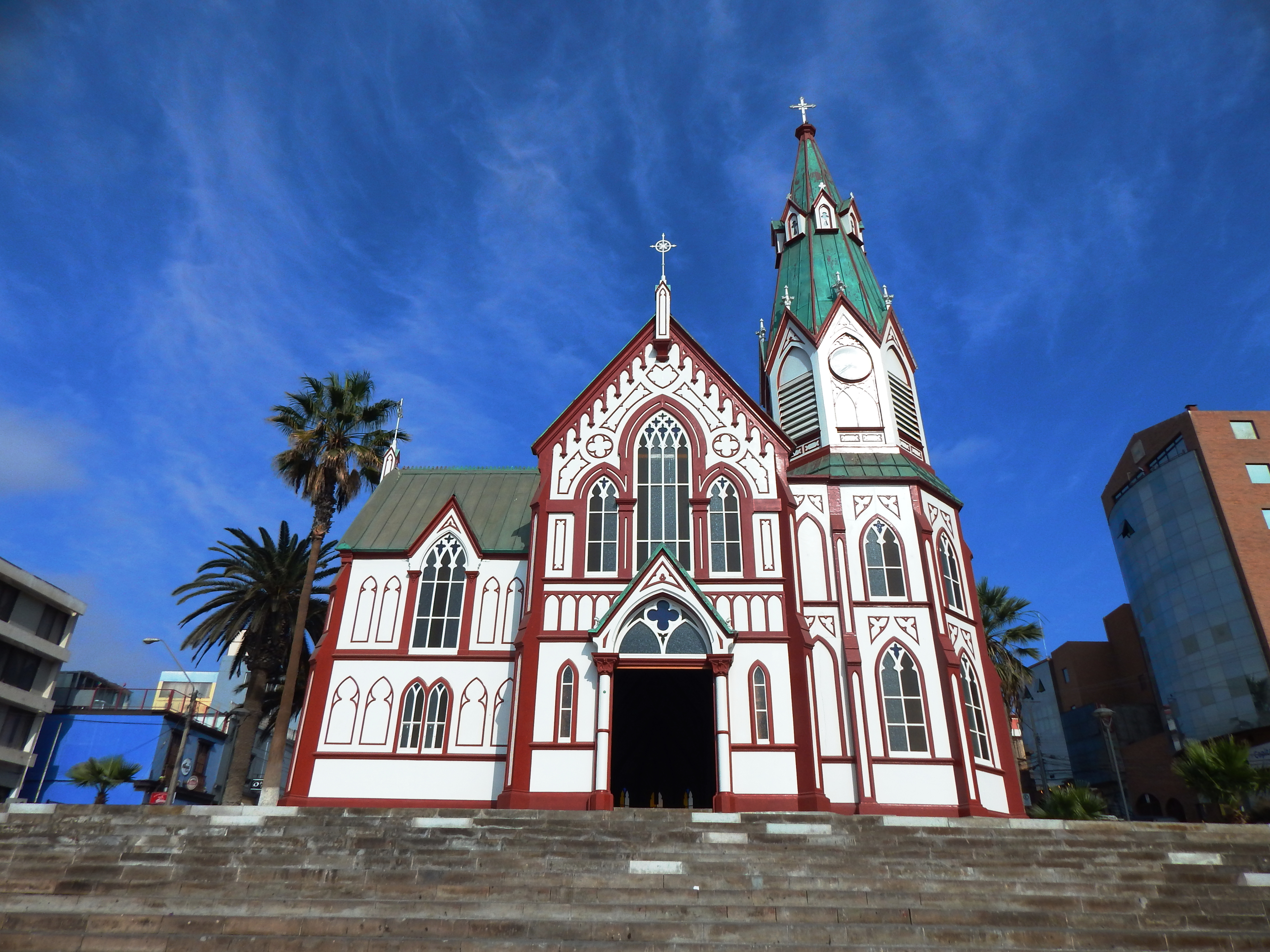
- Saint Mark's Cathedral
- Location: Bolognesi 170, Arica
- Country: Chile
- Denomination: Roman Catholic Church

History
- Founded: 19th century

Architecture
- Heritage designation: National Monument
- Architect: Gustave Eiffel
- Style: Gothic Revival
- Years built: 1875-1876

Administration
- Diocese: San Marcos de Arica

Saint Mark's Cathedral (Spanish: Catedral de San Marcos), also known as the Arica Cathedral, is a Catholic church located in the city of Arica, Chile. The building was commissioned by the government of Peruvian President José Balta from the United States for a structure of cast iron that could be easily transported to Arica via the port of Ancón.

== History ==
The original church stood for 226 years until it was destroyed by an earthquake on August 13, 1868. Because of this, a local women's committee asked then president José Balta for the construction of a new cathedral. The request was accepted, and the building was inaugurated in 1876 on the site of the former church.

The design of the church is often attributed to Gutave Eiffel, and that the structure was sent from France, but there is no evidence in local or French archives to support this.

In 1880, the city was occupied by the Chilean Army during the War of the Pacific. However, until the early twentieth century, the parish of Arica remained part of the diocese of Arequipa, according to the orders of the Holy See. On February 27, 1910, the mayor of Arica, Maximo Lira, decreed the expulsion of Juan Vitaliano Berroa, parish priest of Arica and his assisting priest Juan Gualberto Guevara, being Peruvian, replacing them with Chilean military chaplains. The jurisdiction of Arica went to the Vicariate General Castrense of Chile and soon after (1911) was annexed to the Vicariate Apostolic of Tarapacá (current Diocese of Iquique).

== See also ==
- Roman Catholicism in Chile
- Saint Mark's Cathedral (disambiguation)
