= Belén, Chile =

Village in northern Chile

Coordinates: 18°28′04″S 69°30′52″W

Belén
- Village
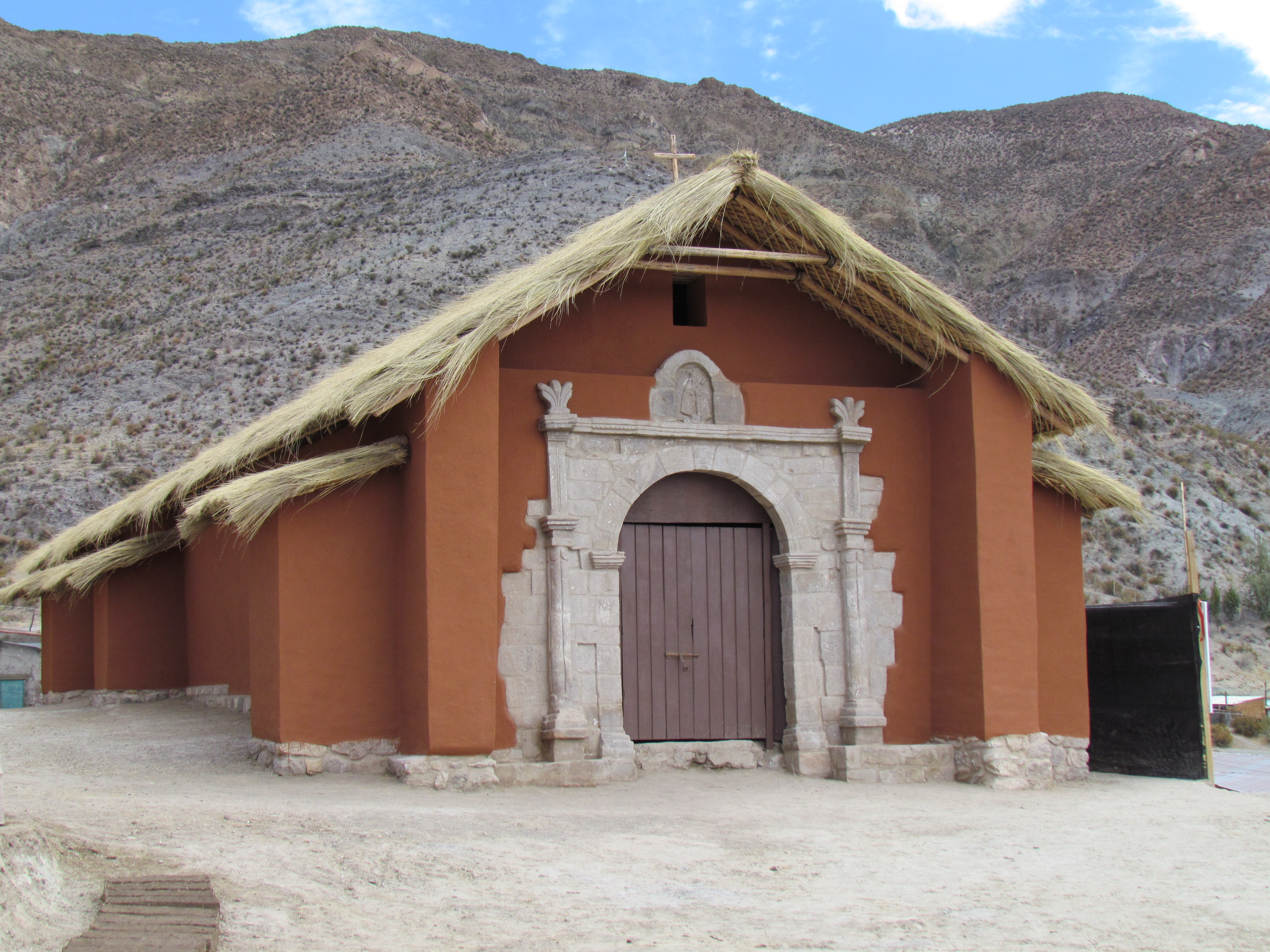
- Virgin of Candelaria temple
- Interactive map of Belén
- Country: Chile
- Region: Arica and Parinacota
- Province: Parinacota
- Commune: Putre
- Founded: 7 October 1625

Belén is a village in the Arica and Parinacota Region, Chile.

The historical monument Pucará de Belén lies 6km to the west of the village.

== History ==
Remains of 8,000-year-old hunter-gatherer temporary settlements were discovered in one of the town's ravines.

The town of Belén was founded on 7 October 1625. In 1648, the Codpa cacicazgo was established and Belén was one of the towns that made it up. Ecclesiastically, Belén was part of the Codpa doctrine, which was split in 1777, and the town became part of the newly established Belén doctrine.

== Geography ==
Belén is 143 kilometers away from Arica, at the head of the Azapa Valley, and is 3,268 meters above sea level. It has several springs, providing the town with permanent access to water resources throughout the year.
