= Treaty of Ancón =

1883 territorial settlement between Chile and Peru

Treaty of Friendship and Peace between the Republics of Chile and Peru
- Type: Peace treaty
- Signed: 20 October 1883
- Location: Ancón, Peru
- Condition: Ratification by Chile on 12–13 January and Peru on 8 March 1884
- Signatories: José Antonio de Lavalle; Mariano Castro Zaldívar; Jovino Novoa Vidal
- Parties: Peru; Chile
- Depositary: Chilean and Peruvian Governments
- Languages: Spanish

The Treaty of Ancón was a peace treaty signed by Chile and Peru on 20 October 1883, in Ancón, near Lima. It was intended to settle the two nations' remaining territorial differences at the conclusion of their involvement in the War of the Pacific and to stabilise post-bellum relations between them.

Under the treaty's terms, Chile gained control over Tarapacá. Chile was also to retain the conquered provinces of Tacna and Arica for ten years, after which their fate was to be decided by a plebiscite, which was never held. The Tacna–Arica question would only be settled in 1929, through the mediation of the United States under President Herbert Hoover. This treaty, known as the Treaty of Lima, ceded Arica to Chile, while Peru regained Tacna and received USD6 million indemnity and other concessions.

== Background ==
During the War of the Pacific and the subsequent Chilean occupation of Peru, a series of parallel governments were established. The Chilean occupying administration established a collaborationist government in La Magdalena headed by Francisco García Calderón in order to be able to represent the occupied country in peace negotiations, while Nicolás de Piérola's constitutional government settled in Ayacucho after leaving Lima. Both governments disputed each other's legitimacy, with a third government headed by Lizardo Montero establishing itself in Arequipa and succeeding García Calderón's government in 1883, after the latter's forced exile to Valparaíso. A fourth government, headed by Miguel Iglesias, succeeded the Magdalena government in 1883 after being recognized by Chile, with both countries establishing the negotiations that would eventually lead to a final peace treaty. Iglesias, unlike the other heads of state, demanded peace with Chile at all costs, including the loss of territory. As a result, Andrés Avelino Cáceres' troops attempted to capture Cajamarca, but did not succeed. Cáceres himself was defeated at the Battle of Huamachuco on 10 July 1883.

== Treaty ==
The treaty's contents mainly dealt with the restoration of peace between both countries, as well as the laws regarding commerce agreed upon by both countries before the war. Article 2 of the treaty ceded the territory of Tarapacá to Chile unconditionally, and Article 13 demanded recognition of the validity of the Chilean administrative and judicial acts that occurred during the military occupation of Peru. The time period established to exchange of ratifications of the treaty was ordered to be within 160 days of the signing of the treaty.

Article 3 of the treaty proved to be the most controversial, as it stipulated that the territory of the provinces of Arica and Tacna were to continue under Chilean administration for 10 years, after which a plebiscite would decide which country the inhabitants wanted to belong to. The country chosen by the plebiscite would then pay $10,000,000 to the other. The plebiscite was never held in the end, with the status quo remaining until 1929, when the Treaty of Lima was signed. Chilean historians claim that this article was a covert transfer of both provinces to Chile and intended to be handed over to Bolivia when peace was signed there. This claim is disputed by Peruvian historians, such as Carlos Paz Soldán and Jorge Basadre.

Articles 4 to 10 deal with the economic consequences of the change of ownership of guano and saltpeter deposits. Chile was to allocate 50% of the profits from the sale of guano from already known deposits to the payment of the Peruvian debt. Profits obtained from unknown deposits before the treaty would go entirely to Chile, this was valid for any form of sales contract. Peru and Chile had to agree on sales prices and amounts to prevent harmful competition, creditors had to have their securities qualified by the Chilean authorities and other debt securities would not be recognized. The Lobos de Afuera Islands would remain under Chilean administration and exploitation as long as there were exploitable guano deposits and 50% of the profits were to be delivered to Peru.

Article 12 established arbitral tribunals that determined the compensation to be paid to Chilean citizens expelled from Peru whose assets had been seized at the beginning of the war.

== Aftermath ==
Dissatisfaction with the treaty led to the Peruvian Civil War of 1884–1885, which overthrew Iglesias' government. On 8 January 1890 the Castellón-Elías protocol was signed, which handed Peru practically all the guano exploitation of Tarapacá, under the condition that it had to hand it over to the creditors. In exchange, the creditors recognized that the debt transferred to Chile for the occupation of the mortgaged deposits was limited to that indicated in the Treaty of Ancón.

The Tacna–Arica situation began the Chilean–Peruvian territorial dispute, which would only be solved in 1929 with the Treaty of Lima, with Tacna returning to Peru and Arica being ceded to Chile. One important provision in the treaty said that Chile could not cede sovereignty of former Peruvian territories to other nations without asking Peru first. The Chapter has been invoked once, during the Chilean proposal of 1975 that offered Bolivia sovereignty over some minor ports. The Peruvian government rejected the proposed land swap.

== See also ==
- Bolivia–Chile peace treaty, 1904
- Treaty of Lima, 1929
