= Treaty of Lima (1929) =

1929 treaty between Chile and Peru

Complementary Treaty and Protocol to Resolve the Question of Tacna and Arica
- Map of the dispute and its resolution.
- Type: Border treaty
- Drafted: 3 June 1929
- Signed: 3 June 1929
- Location: Lima, Peru
- Effective: 28 August 1929
- Signatories: Emiliano Figueroa; Pedro José Rada
- Parties: Chile; Peru

The Treaty of Lima (Note: Spanish: Tratado de Lima; also known as the Rada y Gamio–Figueroa Larraín Treaty (Spanish: Tratado Rada y Gamio-Figueroa, the Tacna–Arica compromise Spanish: Compromiso de Tacna-Arica, or as the Treaty of 1929 Spanish: Tratado de 1929)) was a boundary treaty signed on June 3, 1929. The agreement put an end to the territorial dispute regarding the provinces of Tacna and Arica, which had been administered by Chile since 1883.

The treaty divided Tacna Province, the first-level administrative division established by Chile, into two parts. Tacna was awarded to Peru, and Chile retained its sovereignty over Arica. Chile also agreed to pay up to US$6 million (about £1.23 million; equivalent to $113 million in 2025) in compensation to Peru. It established the border between both states and granted Peru the administration of the Tacna–Arica railway and a pier in the Port of Arica. The treaty was signed on 3 June 1929 in Lima by then-Peruvian Representative Pedro José Rada y Gamio and Chilean Representative Emiliano Figueroa Larrain.

== Background ==
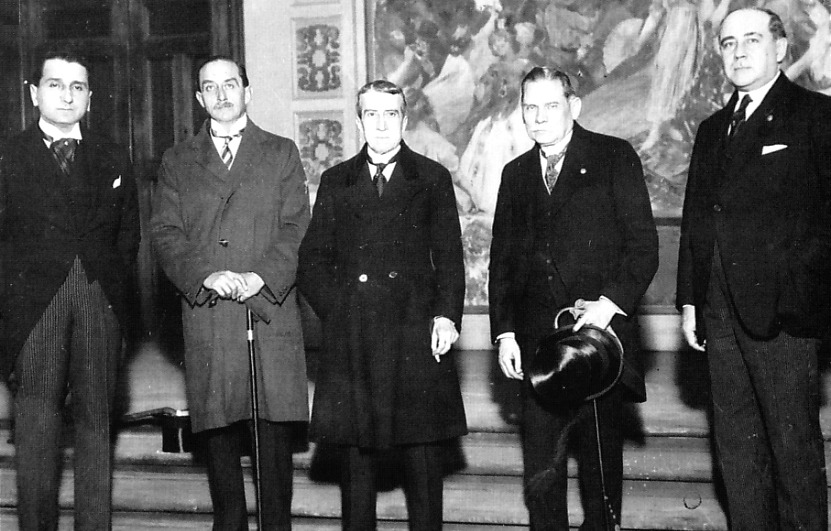
The Peruvian delegation for the ill-fated plebiscite in 1925

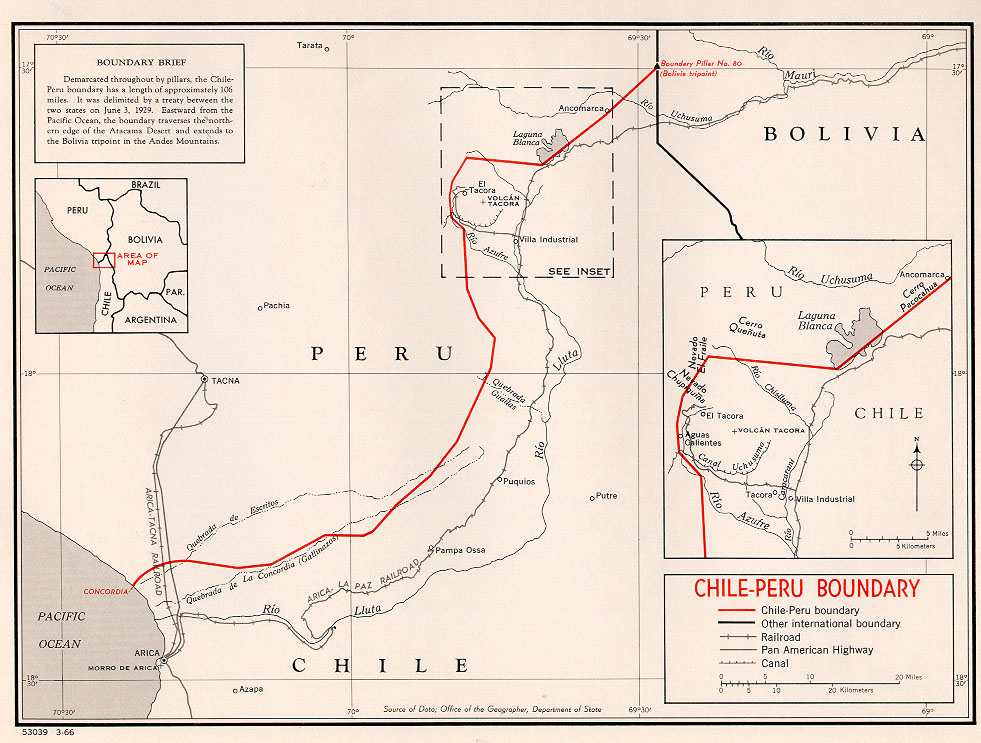
Border Peru-Chile acc. 1929 Treaty File in the Department of State, USA

The controversy was a direct aftermath of the War of the Pacific, a confrontation of Chile against Peru and Bolivia. Chile won the war and conquered the Peruvian territories of Tarapacá, Tacna and Arica. The defeated Peruvian government was forced to sign the Treaty of Ancón in 1883. According to this treaty, Tarapacá was annexed to Chile, and a plebiscite was meant to take place in 1893, 10 years after the signing of the treaty. The plebiscite, however, never took place, as both countries had conflicting points of view and did not reach an agreement. Chile began a campaign known as Chilenization in 1909. Peru followed in 1911 with the recalling of its ambassador and a break of diplomatic relations.

On July 20, 1922, Chile and Peru agreed to arbitrate the dispute with the President of the United States. U.S. President Calvin Coolidge appointed, in 1925, the first U.S. arbitrator, General John J. Pershing; General William Lassiter followed in 1926 following Pershing's resignation on January 18. Neither negotiator was able to break the deadlock. US Secretary of State Frank B. Kellogg suggested direct negotiations in Washington, D.C. in 1928. It was these negotiations that led to the Treaty of Lima.

== Treaty ==
The deal that was finally reached allowed Peru to reacquire Tacna while Chile kept Arica. Chile had also to make some concessions such as building a Peruvian-administered wharf in Arica and pay a six million-dollar indemnification, among other provisions. In 1999, Chile and Peru at last agreed to fully implement the Treaty of Lima, providing Peru with access to port facilities in Arica.

== Consequences ==
The Tacna-Arica compromise was perceived as a setback by Bolivia's ruling elite which how had hoped to obtain an access to the sea. This option that gave Bolivia access to the sea was actually promoted by the United States. In the end the treaty contributed to stiffen Bolivian positions on the issue of the Chaco contributing to the start of the Chaco War with Paraguay in 1932.

== See also ==
- Treaty of Ancón
