= Socoroma =

- Village
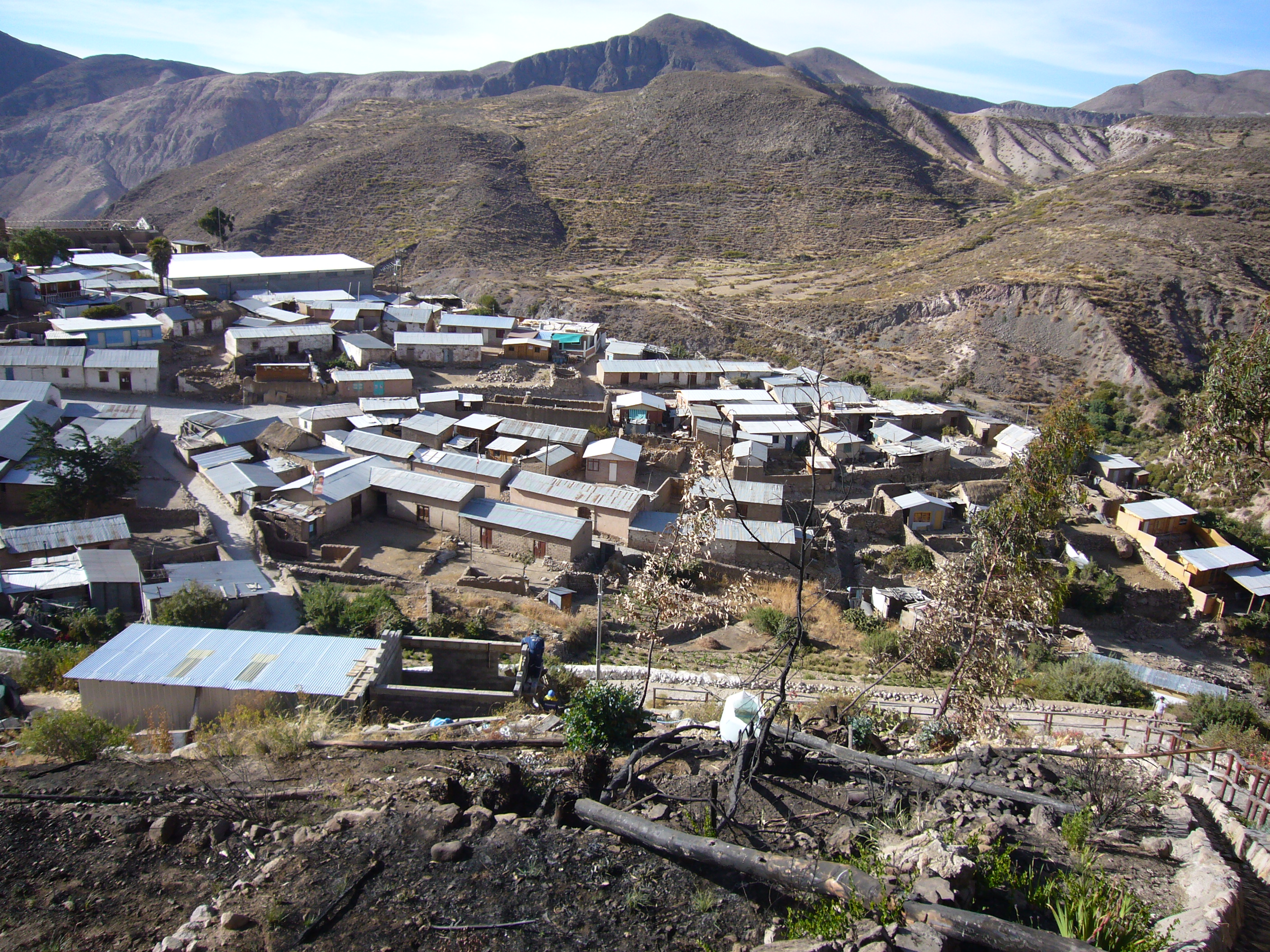
- 2012 at Socoroma, the church (far left) at the time without roof

- Location within Arica y Parinacota Location within Chile
- Coordinates: 18°15′50″S 69°36′08″W
- Country: Chile
- Region: Arica and Parinacota Region
- Elevation approx: 9,800 ft (3,000 m)

Socoroma is a village in the Arica and Parinacota Region, Chile. It lies off Ruta 11 at km 99. It is an old Aymara settlement into which significant investment has been made to try to stop it from becoming a complete ghost town. It has a well-ordered church and plaza.

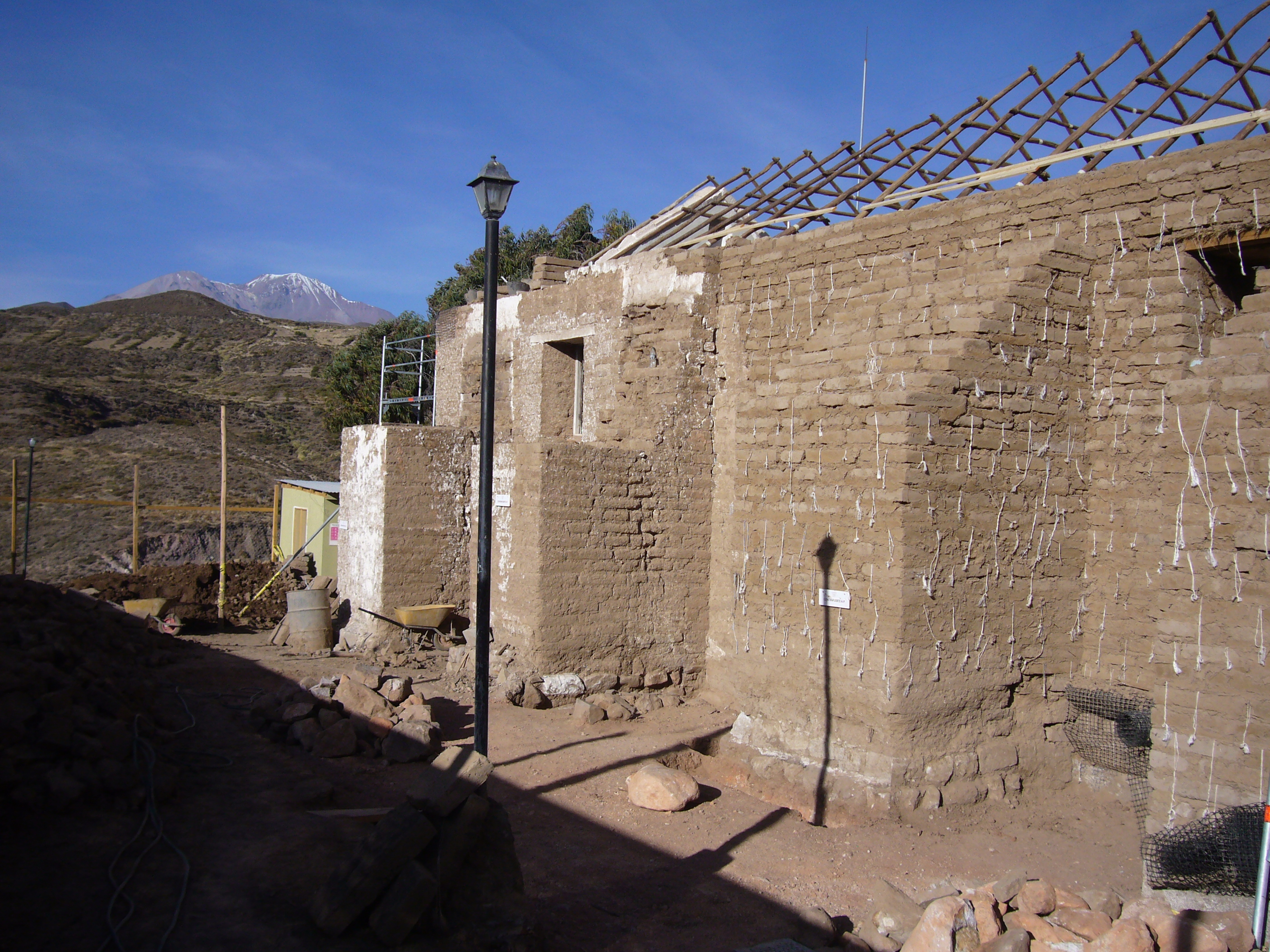
2012 church renovation

The traditional houses are now mostly covered with corrugated iron instead of grass and leather. The church on the other hand was renovated in 2012 and the roof was constructed with the mentioned wood structure tightened by leather. A farm product in the village is Oregano. This Oregano differs from the Oregano produced elsewhere as the plant is protecting itself at this level above sea with extra ingredients.
