= List of World Heritage Sites in Chile =

Location of World Heritage Sites in Chile. Rapa Nui National Park, located 3,700 km (2,300 mi) west of the coast in the Pacific Ocean, is outside the map. The sites of the Inca road system, with 33 locations in Chile, are not shown.

The United Nations Educational, Scientific and Cultural Organization (UNESCO) World Heritage Sites are places of importance to cultural or natural heritage as described in the UNESCO World Heritage Convention, established in 1972. Cultural heritage consists of monuments (such as architectural works, monumental sculptures, or inscriptions), groups of buildings, and sites (including archaeological sites). Natural heritage consists of natural features (physical and biological formations), geological and physiographical formations (including habitats of threatened species of animals and plants), and natural sites which are important from the point of view of science, conservation, or natural beauty. Chile accepted the convention on 20 February 1980, making its sites eligible for inclusion on the list.

There are seven World Heritage Sites in Chile, and a further 18 sites on its tentative list. The first site added to the list was the Rapa Nui National Park, which was listed in 1995. The most recent site listed was the Settlement and Artificial Mummification of the Chinchorro Culture in the Arica and Parinacota Region in 2021. All sites in Chile are listed for their cultural significance. Qhapaq Ñan, Andean Road System is a transnational site and is shared with Argentina, Bolivia, Colombia, Ecuador, and Peru. Humberstone and Santa Laura Saltpeter Works was listed as endangered between 2005 (immediately upon the listing) and 2019 because of the vulnerable state of the buildings. Chile has served on the World Heritage Committee once.

== World Heritage Sites ==
UNESCO lists sites under ten criteria; each entry must meet at least one of the criteria. Criteria i through vi are cultural, and vii through x are natural.

* Transnational site

World Heritage Sites
Site	Image	Location (region)	Year listed	UNESCO data	Description
Rapa Nui National Park	Several Moai sculptures on a slope	Valparaíso	1995	715; i, iii, v (cultural)	Rapa Nui, or Easter Island, is located 3,700 km (2,300 mi) off the coast of Chile. The volcanic island was settled around 300 CE by a group from Polynesia who then developed a unique culture, free of external influences. Between the 10th and 16th centuries, they built monumental shrines and massive stone statues, moai (some statues pictured). The society collapsed due to a combination of ecological crisis with depletion of natural resources and the effects of colonization. The national park covers around 40% of the island and comprises numerous archaeological sites.
Churches of Chiloé	A wooden church with a belltower facade	Los Lagos	2000	971bis; ii, iii (cultural)	This site comprises 16 churches in the Chiloé Archipelago. The Jesuits came to the islands in the early 17th century as missionaries and were later replaced by the Franciscans in the 18th and 19th centuries. The churches represent a fusion of European and vernacular traditions, in a unique Chilotan style. They are entirely made of timber and their construction was strongly influenced by boatbuilding techniques. They still play an important role in the life and culture of the islands. A minor boundary modification took place in 2019. The Church of Nercón is pictured.
Historic Quarter of the Seaport City of Valparaíso	Several houses with colourful facades and a church built uphill	Valparaíso	2003	959rev; iii (cultural)	The Pacific port city of Valparaíso flourished in the 19th century when it was an important stop on the route to the Atlantic Ocean through the Strait of Magellan. Following the opening of the Panama Canal in 1914, it declined in importance. This helped to preserve its late 19th and early 20th century architecture and technical heritage. The city layout is shaped by the geographical setting between the ocean and the hills in the background. There are numerous historical funiculars taking people up the slopes. The Cerro Concepción neighbourhood is pictured.
Humberstone and Santa Laura Saltpeter Works	An abandoned factory building in a desert setting	Tarapaca	2005	1178ter; ii, iii, iv (cultural)	Humberstone (pictured) and Santa Laura are two former saltpeter (sodium nitrate) refineries, representative of more than 200 similar sites in the desert region with world's largest deposit of the mineral that is used to produce fertilizers. The fertilizers contributed to the agricultural revolution worldwide and brought a great wealth to Chile. Between the 1870s and mid-20th century, thousands of workers from Chile, Bolivia, and Peru lived and worked in the plants. They developed a unique Pampinos culture with its own language, customs, and artistic expression. Their struggles for social justice had far-reaching effects on the labour laws in Chile and beyond. Immediately upon the inscription, the site was listed as endangered because of the vulnerable state of the buildings, which were further weakened by the 2014 earthquake. Upon the introduction of the protective measures, the site was removed from the endangered list in 2019. Minor boundary modifications were done in 2011 and 2019.
Sewell Mining Town	A mining town located on a steep slope. Buildings have facades in different colours and the mountains are covered by snow.	O'Higgins	2006	1214; ii (cultural)	Sewell Mining Town is an example of a company mining town constructed at a remote locality by the fusion of local communities and international resources from industrialized nations. It was constructed in 1905 by the US mining Braden Copper Company to house the workers of El Teniente, the world's largest underground copper mine. The town is located on steep mountain slopes at an elevation above 2,200 m (7,200 ft), in a harsh climate. In the late 1960s, at its peak, it housed 15,000 people. It was largely abandoned in the 1970s.
Qhapaq Ñan, Andean Road System*	Paved path in the mountains	several sites	2014	1459; ii, iii, iv, vi (cultural)	Qhapaq Ñan is an extensive pre-Incan and Incan road system, spanning over 30,000 km (19,000 mi) across the Andes. The roads connect high mountain peaks with rainforests, coasts, valleys, and deserts. The road system formed the lifeline of the Inca Empire, allowing transport and exchange of goods, as well as movement of messengers, travelers, and even armies. The site comprises 273 components featuring structures such as roads, bridges, ditches, and supporting infrastructure, 33 of which are in Chile. The site is shared with Argentina (a section pictured), Bolivia, Colombia, Ecuador, and Peru.
Settlement and Artificial Mummification of the Chinchorro Culture in the Arica and Parinacota Region	Museum exhibit of Chichorro mummies	Atacama, Antofagasta, Arica y Parinacota	2021	1634; iii, v (cultural)	This property comprises three archaeological sites with the remains of marine hunter-gatherer communities that lived in the area from c. 5450 BCE to c. 890 BCE. The culture is best known for their mummies which present the oldest examples of artificial mummification in the world. Some bodies mummified naturally while others were disassembled and reassembled to create mummies of particular aesthetics, indicating the special role of the dead in the culture. Mummies are well preserved because of the extremely dry climate of the Atacama Desert. In addition, shell middens and tools made of shell and bone were found. A museum exhibit is pictured.

== Tentative list ==
In addition to sites inscribed on the World Heritage List, member states can maintain a list of tentative sites that they may consider for nomination. Nominations for the World Heritage List are only accepted if the site was previously listed on the tentative list. Chile has 19 sites on its tentative list.

Tentative sites
Site	Image	Location (region)	Year listed	UNESCO criteria	Description
Torres del Paine and Bernardo O'Higgins National Parks, Region of Magallanes	Rugged mountain peaks of Cuernos del Paine, a lake in front	Magallanes	1994	x (natural)	The two national parks, together with the Los Glaciares National Park in Argentina, cover most of the Southern Patagonian Ice Field with numerous glaciers. The mountains of the Cordillera Paine group are known as challenging mountain climbing destinations. On the western side, the site extends to the Pacific Ocean with numerous fjords and islands. There are numerous examples of glacial landforms.
Juan Fernández Archipelago National Park	Rugged island landscape with some vegetation and boats on the shore	Valparaíso	1994	x (natural)	The Juan Fernández Archipelago is located in the Pacific Ocean above a volcanic hotspot on the Nazca Plate. Because of its remoteness, flora and fauna of the islands show high degrees of endemism, with influences from tropical Americas, Antarctica, as well as from Asia and Australasia. The National Park was established in 1935. Robinson Crusoe Island is pictured.
Fell and Pali Aike Caves	Entrance to a cave	Magallanes	1998	iii, iv (cultural)	These two caves are archaeological sites that show evidence of occupation by Paleo-Indian hunter-gatherer communities as long as 11,000 years ago. Finds include three cremated human skeletons, tools, including the characteristic fishtail darts, and remains of large mammals that people were hunting, including the extinct Mylodon and Hippidion. as well as still existing species, such as guanaco. Despite the close proximity to the sea, the early communities did not use marine resources. The entrance to the Pali Aike cave is pictured.
Rupestrian art of the Patagonia		Aysén, Magallanes	1998	i, ii, iii (cultural)	This nomination comprises several sites with cave art in Patagonia. Some of the sites have been dated to be nearly 10,000 years old, such as the Los Toldos on the Argentinian side. Images include hand stencils, depictions of guanacos and ñandus, and abstract motifs. Sites are located along the Ibáñez River, and around the General Carrera Lake, including the Pedregoso River Cave.
The Defensive Complex of Valdivia	Defensive coastal wall with several old-style cannons	Los Ríos	1998	i, iii, iv (cultural)	With an increasing maritime traffic through the Strait of Magellan and around the Cape Horn in the late 16th century, the Chilean and Peruvian coasts under the Spanish were vulnerable to the attacks and raids by the English, Dutch, and pirates, as well as to the hostile natives. This prompted the Spanish to invest in stronger fortifications. The works at Valdivia started in 1645 and initially comprised four fortresses around the mouth of the Valdivia River. The complex later expanded to include structures such as bastions, turrets, a castle with a moats and a drawbridge, and artillery batteries (the one at Niebla pictured).
Locomotive depot of the Temuco Railroad Station	Locomotives in a railway museum	Araucanía Region	1998	iv (cultural)	After the arrival of railroads to Temuco at the end of the 19th century, the city became an important railroad centre where trains changed locomotives. Repairs took place at the depot as well. Initially, only steam locomotives were being serviced, with diesel locomotives since 1954 as well. The depot declined after 1983 and was converted to the Pablo Neruda National Railway Museum in 2004, named after the poet who spent part of his youth there.
Malleco Viaduct	A large steel viaduct, painted yellow, crossing a river gorge	Araucanía Region	1998	i, iv (cultural)	The railway bridge, crossing the Malleco River, was inaugurated in 1890. At that time, it was considered the highest railroad bridge in the world, crossing a gorge 110 m (360 ft) deep. The steel frames were constructed in workshops in Europe and assembled on site. The bridge rests on four intermediate pillars and is 347.5 m (1,140 ft) long.
Houses of the hacienda San José del Carmen el Huique	Neoclassical church, decorated fence, and a palm tree	O'Higgins	1998	ii, iii, v (cultural)	The hacienda, or a farm estate, was established in the early 17th century and became a centre of colonization of the region, introducing novel agricultural practices that made it flourish. Subsequent generations expanded the estate and constructed new buildings. Two of the prominent residents were the politicians Juan José Echenique, who constructed a neoclassical church (pictured) in 1852, and Federico Errázuriz Echaurren, who served as the President of Chile from 1896 to 1901. The complex represents an illustration of the life on a hacienda in the early republican period of the country.
San Francisco Church and Convent	Church with a bell tower and a fountain in front	Santiago	1998	ii, iv (cultural)	The church was built on the site of a Franciscan hermitage that housed a revered image of Virgin Mary, brought from Italy. After the hermitage was destroyed by an earthquake in 1583, the church was consecrated in the early 17th century. It saw several renovations and expansions, as it was several times hit by strong earthquakes. The current bell tower is in the Victorian style and was built in the 19th century. The stuccoed ceiling of the central nave is in the Mudéjar style and its construction started in 1615.
La Moneda Palace	A palace with several flagpoles with flags of Chile in front	Santiago	1998	ii, iii, iv, v (cultural)	The building was originally designed as a mint during the colonial times. It was designed by the Italian architect Joaquín Toesca in a neoclassical style. It was completed in 1805. In 1846, it became the residence of the President of Chile, although the mint remained in operation until 1922. The building saw several modifications but it was restored to its original design in 1981.
Cerro El Plomo high shrine	A replica of the Plomo mummy, a child in a sitting position with crossed hands and braided hair	Santiago	1998	ii, iii, vi (cultural)	The Cerro El Plomo mountain was used as a ceremonial site by the Incas around 500 years ago, at the southernmost extent of their empire. In a shrine, located at an elevation of 5,430 m (17,810 ft), a well-preserved frozen mummy of a child, aged 8 or 9, was discovered in 1954. The so-called Plomo Mummy (replica pictured) illustrates the most solemn Incan child sacrifice ritual Capacocha, performed during hard times or at special moments of the year. The child had their hair braided, was adorned with textiles and ornaments, led in a procession to the shrine, intoxicated with drugs and alcohol, and eventually buried alive in the sepulchral chamber.
Ayquina and Toconce	Unpaved street among stone houses	Antofagasta	1998	ii, iii, iv, v, vi (cultural)	The two villages are located at high elevations in the Andes, around 3,000 m (9,800 ft) above sea level. People practice camelid stockbreeding and terrace farming of vegetables. Ayquina (pictured) is home to the festival dedicated to Our Lady of Guadalupe, which draws in people from neighbouring communities. Toconce also has festivals, including those associated with cattle and with cleaning of irrigation channels.
San Pedro de Atacama	Remains of adobe buildings	Antofagasta Region	1998	ii, iii, v (cultural)	Atacama Desert was already inhabited at least around 10,000 BCE with hunter-gatherer communities. They later adopted semi-sedentary lifestyle and in the 2nd millennium BCE started growing maize and domesticating camelids. The Atacama culture developed in the 1st millennium CE. They built adobe villages such as Tulor (remains pictured). They were influenced by the Tiwanaku culture from 400 to 1200 CE, then they gradually passed under the Inca Empire and finally under the Spanish in the 16th century. There are numerous archaeological sites with remains from different periods in the area.
Baquedano Street	View of the Baquedano Street from above at night	Tarapacá	1998	ii, v (cultural)	Baquedano Street is a historic area in Iquique, a port town that made its fortune in the 19th century with shipments of sodium nitrate to North America and Europe. The town was hit by two fires and two earthquakes, the last in 1885, so most of the architecture dates from the late 19th and early 20th centuries. The houses are made of imported Douglas fir using balloon framing and were designed in different architectural styles of the United States. They housed foreign workers involved with the mining industry. Some monuments on the street include the Clock Tower (Iquique), a theatre, and social clubs.
Churches of the Altiplano	A simple church made of stone and adobe with a small bell tower	Arica y Parinacota, Tarapacá	1998	ii, iii, v (cultural)	Churches of the Chilean Altiplano were constructed by the Spanish missionaries from the late 16th century onward. There are around 50 churches that share similar design, called "Andean mestizo". They are simple buildings made of stone, adobe, mud, and local wood. They were typically erected outside the existing villages. Iglesia de Mulluri is pictured.
Monte Verde Archaeological Site	Monte Verde archaeological site, meadows with some cows, a dog, a river, and a building	Los Lagos	2004	iii, iv (cultural)	Monte Verde is an archaeological site with the remains of a settlement that has been carbon dated to be about 14,800 years old, predating the Clovis culture by about 1000 years. People of Monte Verde hunted mastodons and camelids and were collecting local plants. The settlement was a permanent one, as opposed to temporary camps of hunter-gatherers. Remains of stone and wooden tools were discovered on the site.
Lota Mining Complex	Museum building with old elevator shaft	Biobío	2021	ii, iv (cultural)	Lota was founded in 1852 as a company town to support coal mining of coal deposits on land and also under the seabed. Some deposits were located 500 m (1,600 ft) below the sea level and 5 km (3.1 mi) off the coast. It housed an international community of workers which resulted in exchange of culture and ideas, such as technology, architecture, and urban design. The mine ceased its operations in 1997 and several of its components are now protected as technical heritage.
Chilean Pisco Vine and Wine Cultural Landscape	Vineyards near mountains	Atacama, Coquimbo	2025	ii, iv, v (cultural)	This nomination includes the vineyards and distilleries in Huasco, Elqui (pictured) and Limari valleys.
Pintados Geoglyphs Archaeological Complex in the Tarapacá Region	Geoglyphs on sandy hills	Tarapacá	2025	iii, v, ix (mixed)	These geoglyphs, located in the Pampa del Tamarugal National Reserve in the Atacama Desert, reflect the culture of the pre-Hispanic inhabitants of the area and illustrate how they adapted their lives to such a hostile environment. Despite its saline soil and arid conditions, the desert has an unexpectedly diverse ecosystem, showcasing the evolution of the local species (such as the tamarugo tree) that have adapted to survive in the harsh surroundings.
