= Pisagua Department =

Department of Chile (1884–1974)

Pisagua Department Departamento de Pisagua
- Department of Chile
- 1884–1974
- Flag

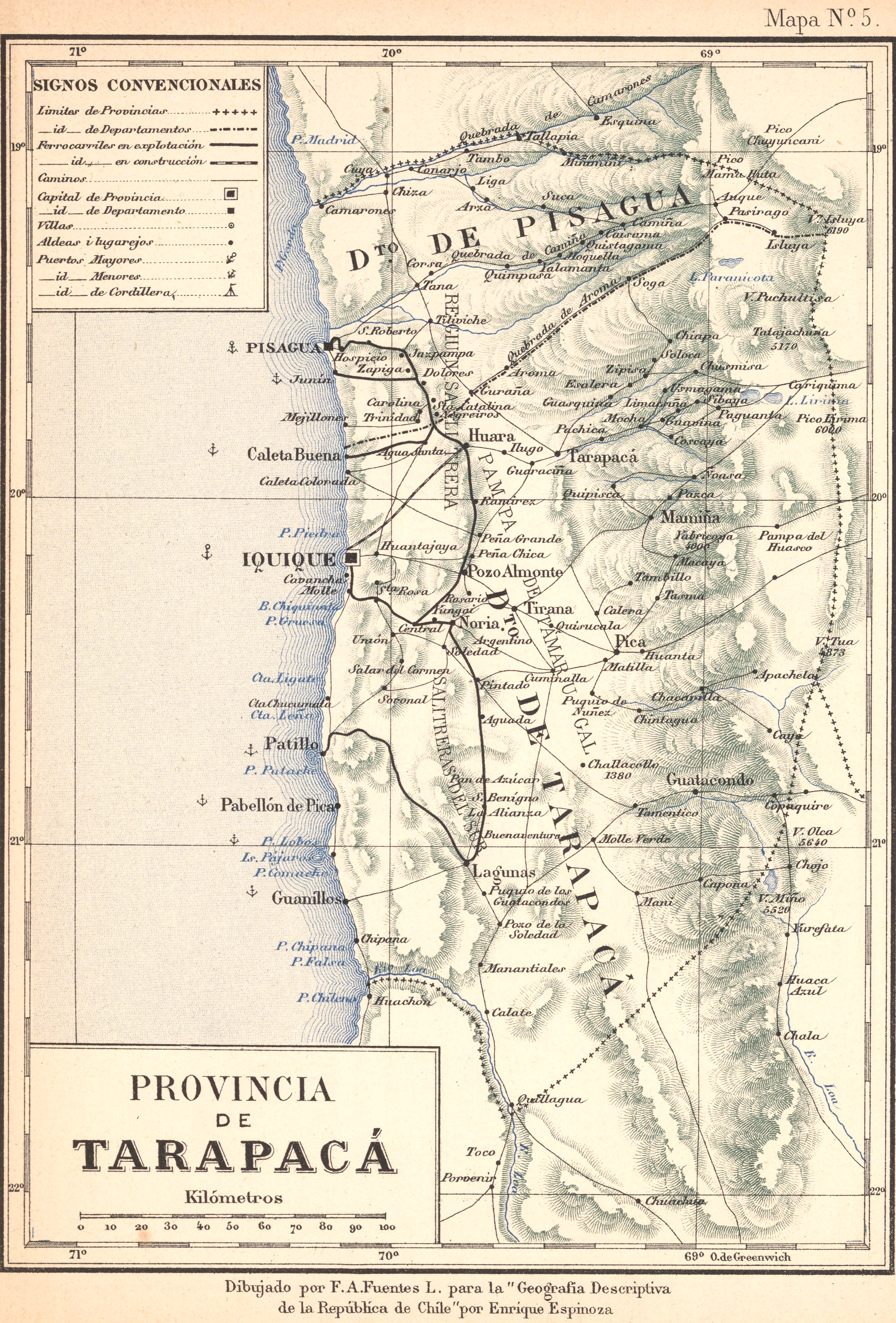
- Map of Tarapacá Province (1895)
- Capital: Pisagua (1884-1970); Huara (1970-1979)
- Demonym: Pisagüino
- Historical era: War of the Pacific aftermath
  - Established: 31 October 1884
  - Disestablished: July 1974
Preceded by	Succeeded by
Tarapacá Department	Tamarugal Province
- Today part of: Chile

Pisagua Department was a department in Tarapacá Province, Chile, from 1883 to 1974. It was ceded to Chile under the Treaty of Ancón, formerly being part of the Peruvian province of the same name.

== History ==
The department was created on 31 October 1884 under the administration of the also new Tarapacá Province, both awarded to Chile under the Treaty of Ancón, along with Tacna. It was bordered to the north by the Arica Department, to the east by Bolivia, to the south by the Tarapacá Department (after 1928 the Iquique Department), and to the west by the Pacific Ocean.

== See also ==
- War of the Pacific
- Treaty of Ancón
- Consequences of the War of the Pacific
- Chilenization of Tacna, Arica and Tarapacá
- Tacna Province (Chile)
- Litoral Department
- Arica Province (Peru)
- Department of Tarapacá (Peru)
- Tarapacá Department (Chile)
