= Tarapacá Department =

Tarapacá Department or Department of Tarapacá may refer to:

- Department of Tarapacá (Peru) 1878–1883.
- Tarapacá Department (Chile) 1883–1928, part of Tarapacá Province
