= Arratia =

Arratia may also refer to:

- Arratia (surname), a family name from Basque Country
- Arratia-Nerbioi, a comarca in the province of Biscay, in Basque Country, Spain
- Arratia River, a Basque Country river flowing into the Ibaizabal River (Note: A separate river by the same name is part of the Zadorra basin, also in Basque Country. (Arratia (Q95611581)))
- Arratia Valley, a valley in Biscay, named for the river running through it
- Arratia (merindad), a historic administrative division in the Lordship of Biscay
- Arratia, Spain (Basque: Arratiako Udalen Mankomunitatea), a municipal association (Spanish: mancomunidad) in the province of Biscay, in Basque Country, Spain
