= Tarapacá Province =

Province of Chile (1884–1974)

Tarapacá
- Province of Chile
- 1884–1974
- Flag

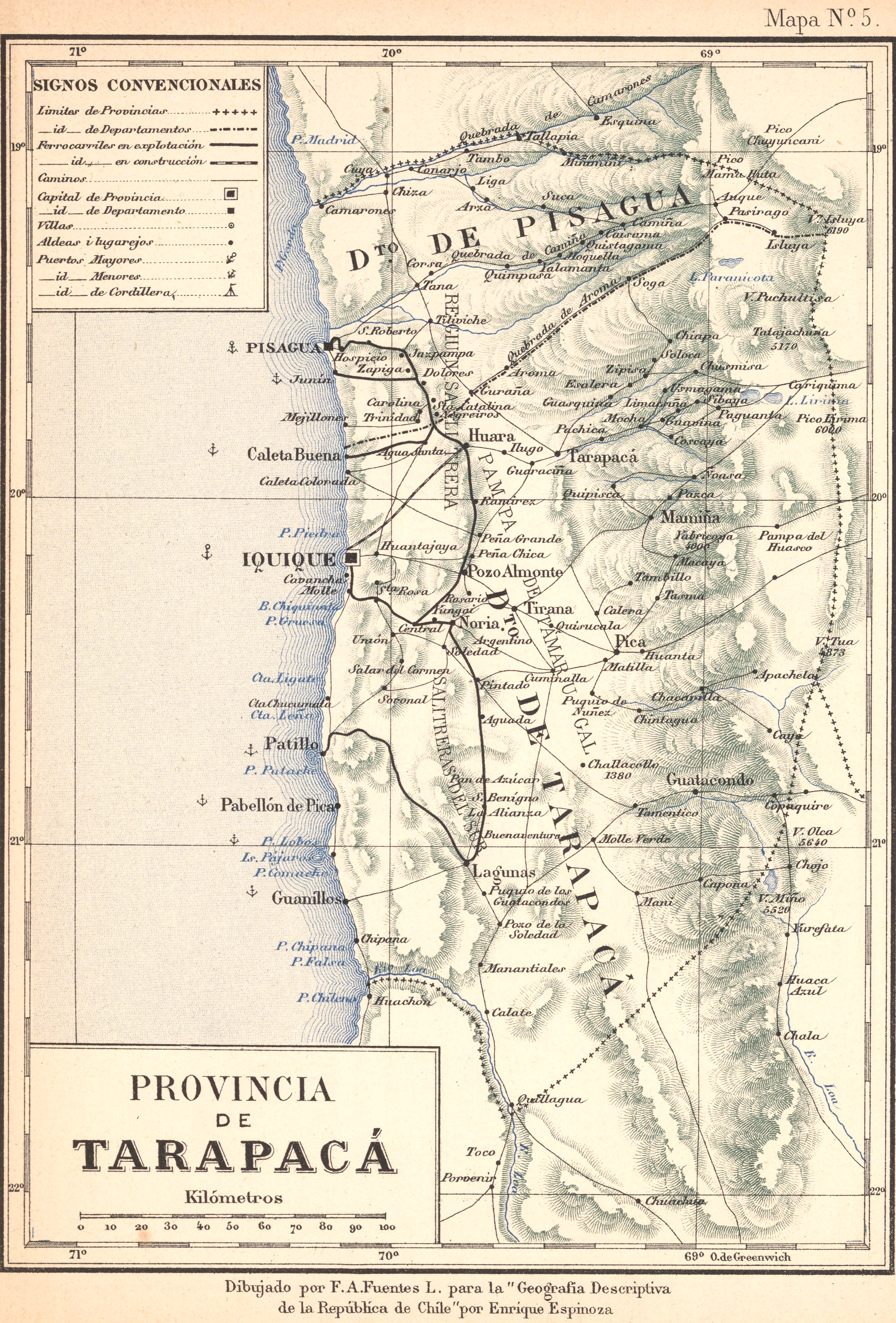
- Map of Tarapacá Province (1895)
- Capital: Iquique
- Demonym: Tarapaqueño, a
- Area
  - 1884: 50,000 km^{2} (19,000 sq mi)
  - 1929: 58,072 km^{2} (22,422 sq mi)
- Historical era: War of the Pacific
  - Treaty of Ancón: 20 October 1883
  - Established: 31 October 1884
  - Reorganised: 1974
Preceded by	Succeeded by
Tarapacá Department	Tarapacá Region
- Today part of: Chile

Tarapacá (Aymara: Tarapaka) was a province in Chile. Ceded to Chile by Peru following the War of the Pacific through the 1883 Treaty of Ancón, it existed from 1884 to 1976. It capital was Iquique.

The Treaty of Ancón, which put an end to the war, was signed on October 20, 1883. The following year, the province was formally created on October 31, incorporating the former Peruvian department of the same name. At the time, the provinces were the first-level administrative divisions of Chile. In 1974, the government of Chile reorganised its administrative organisation, replacing the provinces with regions. Tarapacá was consequently reorganised into a region of the same name, which also incorporated some territory belonging to Antofagasta Province.

== Etymology ==
The province's name is of pre-Columbian origin, originally used to describe Viracocha, a local deity adored both by the Incans and their predecessors. It was first used by Diego de Almagro as a geographical term in 1536.

== History ==
The territory was awarded to Chile under the Treaty of Ancón, signed on October 20, 1883. Unlike Tacna, the former Peruvian department was perpetually ceded by the treaty. One year later, the province was officially created on October 31, with its territory subdivided into the departments of Pisagua and Tarapacá.

After the Treaty of Lima, in 1929, Tacna Province, along with Tacna Department, were dissolved and returned to Peru, with Arica Department being incorporated to Tarapacá Province, with a new area of 58.072 km².

In 1974, Tarapacá Region was created out of the former province, as well parts of Antofagasta Province.

== Politics ==
At the time, the provinces were Chile's first-level administrative division, each administered by an intendant.

=== List of intendants ===
Mayor	Party	Term	
Mayor	Party	Begin	End
Antonio Alfonso Cavada	—N/a	1880	1881
Rafael Sotomayor Gaete	Radical	1881	1882
José de Mendoza y Jaraquemada	—N/a	October 18, 1881	June 1882
Anfión Muñoz y Muñoz	Radical	February 19, 1886	September 13, 1887
Francisco Freire Caldera	Liberal	1898	1899
Recaredo Amengual Novajas	—N/a	1916	

=== Subdivisions ===
The province was divided into three departments, themselves divided into communes:

Department	Capital	Sub-delegations	Districts
Arica (Note: Incorporated into the province in 1930 following the 1929 Treaty of Lima.)	Arica	7	
Pisagua	Pisagua	5	18
Iquique (Note: Named "Tarapacá" from 1884 to December 30, 1927.)	Iquique	13	34

== Geography ==
The province was located to the south of the ravine of Camarones River.

=== Boundaries ===
The province was bordered to the north by Arica, a subdivision of Tacna Province, to the south by Antofagasta Province, to the east by Bolivia, and to the west by the Pacific Ocean.

== See also ==
- Chilenization of Tacna, Arica and Tarapacá
- War of the Pacific
- Tacna Province (Chile)
- Litoral Department
- Arica Province (Peru)
- Tarapacá Department (Chile)
