= Arratia (surname) =

Arratia is a surname. It is a habitational surname from Arratia River and the historic district of Arratia, from which the surname is derived. Notable people with this surname include:

- Carlos Torres Arratia (born 1977), Chilean soccer player
- Cristhian Cámara Arratia (born 1974), Bolivian politician
- Félix Arratia Cruz (born 1993), Mexican politician
- Francisco de Acebal y Arratia (1795–c. 1854), Spanish politician and businessman
- Francisco Arratia, Mexican journalist
- Geoconda Navarrete Arratia (born 1969), Chilean politician
- Juan de Arratia, Spanish sailor
- Maria Eskibel Arratia (died 1536), philanthropist
- Pablo Paredes Arratia (born 1983), Spanish soccer player
- Rafael Arratia (born 1946), Chilean physician
- Richard Arratia, mathematician
