= Colombianization of Leticia, Putumayo and Caquetá =

History of Colombia

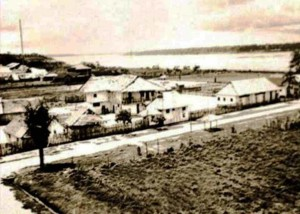
Leticia in 1930 with houses built by the Military Colonization Group of the Colombian Army.

The Colombianization of Leticia, Putumayo and Caquetá is the name used to designate a process of transculturation or acculturation of the areas recognized under the sovereignty of Colombia, with the purpose of transplanting Colombian cultural traditions, in replacement of those cultivated in Peru.

After a long border conflict, Peru recognized Colombia's possession of the area between the Caquetá and Putumayo rivers; and the so-called Leticia Trapeze, a corridor that provides Colombia with an outlet to the Amazon River. Both Peru and Colombia made efforts to try to secure these territories and their inhabitants for themselves. In practice, before 1922, Peru exercised sovereignty over most of the area that it claimed as its own.

The Salomón-Lozano Treaty (1922) received great opposition from the population of the Peruvian department of Loreto, adjacent to the Colombian State. After two years of tension on the border, the Colombia–Peru War broke out, triggered by the occupation of Leticia by Peruvian civilians, and after the conflict, the situation remained in a status quo. It was from that moment that the true process of Colombianization of these territories began, intervening in private and public organizations in the area, using the fiscal school, military service and the work of the Catholic Church to its favor. Currently, the Treaty is still in effect and recognized by both parties.

== Background ==
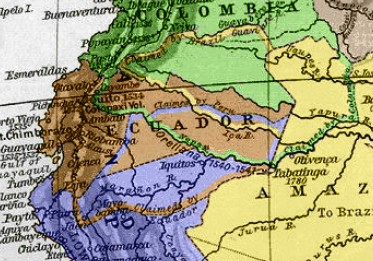
Territories in dispute between Peru, Colombia, Ecuador and Brazil at the beginning of the 20th century.

The Colombian–Peruvian dispute traces its origins after the end of the independence struggles in Spanish America. Despite the initial negotiations between the two countries, the fall of Great Colombia and the turbulent political climate that followed prevented the delimitation of the border.

After the Peruvian political instability, this nation sought recognition of its titles on the Amazon region. In its negotiations with Brazil, Peru obtained from this country the recognition of its sovereignty up to the Caquetá River.

Until 1894, Peruvian diplomacy had negotiated sovereignty in the Amazon only with Ecuador and Brazil. That year, Colombia joined a tripartite convention with Ecuador and Peru that sought to resolve this dispute. The negotiations failed, since Colombia preferred to negotiate directly with Peru.

At the beginning of the 20th century, Peru exercised de facto sovereignty over the disputed territories. As the Colombian historian Alberto Donadio admitted:

At the end of the first decade of the 20th century, Peruvians were de facto sovereign over the entire strip between the Caquetá and Putumayo rivers. The Colombian claim could be founded on just titles, but it was nothing more than an illusion before the real advance of the Peruvians.

In 1911 the dispute would become violent, with the so-called battle of La Pedrera.

== The Salomón-Lozano Treaty ==
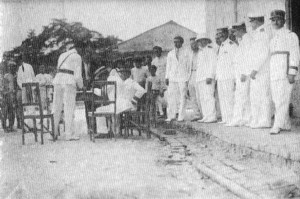
The act of transfer of Leticia and other territories exchanged for the Treaty in 1930 is signed.

The disputed areas between Peru and Colombia initially comprised the area between the Napo and Caquetá rivers. As already mentioned, the Peruvians had effective control of those territories.

After several unsuccessful negotiations, Peruvian President Leguía was willing to sign a direct settlement. On March 24, 1922, the Peruvian Foreign Minister, Alberto Salomón, and the Colombian plenipotentiary in Lima, Fabio Lozano Torrijos, signed a definitive boundary Treaty between their countries. The boundary line was as follows:

The border line between the Peruvian Republic and the Republic of Colombia is agreed, agreed and fixed in the following terms: From the point where the meridian of the mouth of the Cuhimbé River in the Putumayo crosses the San Miguel River or Sucumbíos, go up that same meridian to said mouth of the Cuhimbé; from there by the Putumayo River to the confluence of the Yaguas River; It follows a straight line that from this confluence goes to the Atacuari River in the Amazon and from there along the Amazon River to the limit between Peru and Brazil established in the Peru-Brazilian Treaty of October 23, 1851.

The agreement received political opposition from Peru and Brazil – the latter opposed a Colombian access to the Amazon River. The Peruvian Foreign Ministry worked for a revision of the Treaty even before it was sent for approval in Congress. Finally the ratifications would be exchanged on March 19, 1928.

== The application of the Treaty and its opposition ==
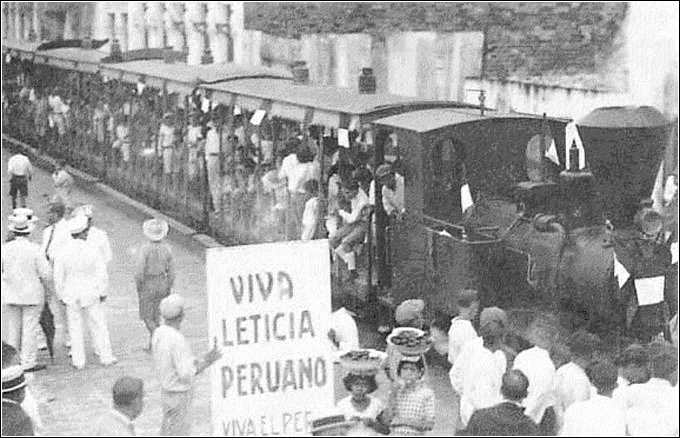
Protesters in Peru opposing the transfer of Leticia to Colombia.

Opposition to the land transfer was evident throughout the Peruvian department of Loreto. However, the Colombian border delegation that arrived in Iquitos was not the victim of violent demonstrations. On August 17, 1930, the prefect of Loreto, Temístocles Molina Derteano, made effective the delivery of those territories to his new authorities.

The approval of the Treaty alone was a long process of 5 years, with a vote of 102 to 7 in the Peruvian Congress. Even today, Peruvian President Leguía is still criticized for signing this Treaty, considered excessively surrendering. However, the intention of the Peruvian government was to win an ally for Peru, when it was overwhelmed by the conflicts with Ecuador and Chile. Indeed, one consequence of the Treaty was for Colombia to support Peru in the Ecuadorian–Peruvian dispute and for Ecuador to sever its relations with Colombia. Despite everything, however, the tensions on the border would continue with the first decisions of the Colombians in their newly acquired territories.

== The first signs of Colombianization ==
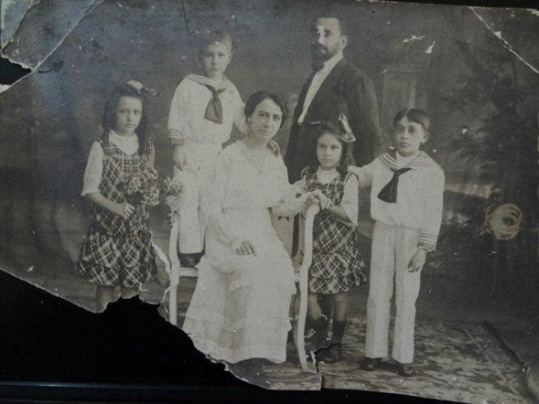
Last photo of farmer Enrique Vigil and his family in Leticia before leaving for Barbados due to the difficult situation that Peruvians faced even before the Colombianization process.

The new Colombian authorities applied controversial measures, such as the harassment of a Peruvian farmer called Enrique Vigil: it is said that the Colombians prohibited the circulation of tokens in the "La Victoria" farm and the payment with them. This fact affected hundreds of Peruvian workers, since their form of payment now had no value. (Note: Vouchers or tokens were a means of payment for farm workers that could only be exchanged for merchandise in the bosses' grocery stores or in certain businesses in some towns.)

In addition, Colombia was accused of breaching the 1922 Treaty, for hindering navigation and trade, especially in the Amazon River and the Putumayo River, deeply affecting the economic life of that part of the Peruvian Amazon region. In the region there were frictions between Peruvians and Colombians: in Leticia, for example, the Peruvians were harassed.

Other Peruvian settlements located between Putumayo and Caquetá saw themselves affected, such as Puerto Arica or Tarapacá, which had been founded by Peruvian refugees of the War of the Pacific that had either left out of their own free will, or had been expelled or harassed by the Chilean authorities or population after their occupation and integration of the former provinces and departments of Arica and Tarapacá, as well as Tacna. These settlers were once again forced to migrate down south to Peruvian territory in the Loreto Department, founding new settlements with the same names.

== The Colombia–Peru War ==
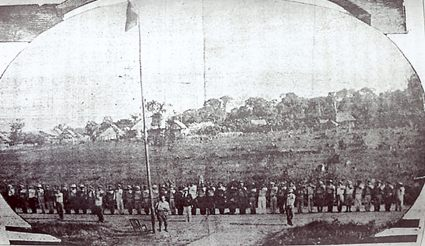
Peruvian troops next to the Peruvian flag stationed in Leticia.

On September 1, 1932, 48 Peruvian civilians stormed Leticia, claiming her as Peruvian. The action was carried out without bloodshed and with the support of the population, which was still predominantly Peruvian. This fact was surprising for both the Colombian and Peruvian governments. Neither of them was prepared for war.

The situation was considered a mere border incident. However, Peruvians from Loreto strongly supported the town's recovery. This situation forced the Peruvian government of Sánchez Cerro to go from a peaceful behavior to a more belligerent one. (Note: The government that had signed the 1922 treaty had been overthrown by the Peruvian military following the disastrous situation in the country due to the 1929 crisis. Luis Miguel Sánchez Cerro, who was totally opposed to his predecessor, was elected as the new Peruvian president.) Peru requested the revision of the Salomón-Lozano Treaty, a request that was rejected by Colombia, then led by Enrique Olaya Herrera.

The fighting and incidents took place along the Putumayo River. Diplomatic negotiations continued, but the extreme of an all-out war was almost reached. 30,000 Peruvian soldiers were to be sent to the border, but the Peruvian president was assassinated after reviewing troops on April 30, 1933. The new Peruvian president, Óscar R. Benavides, a friend of the recently elected Colombian president Alfonso López Pumarejo, was willing to continue with the negotiations until a definitive solution was adopted. On May 25, the armistice was signed, and on June 25 Peruvian troops withdrew from Leticia.

The following year the delegations of both nations signed the Rio de Janeiro Protocol, where the 1922 Treaty was ratified and other provisions on navigation and commerce were included.

== The Colombianization ==
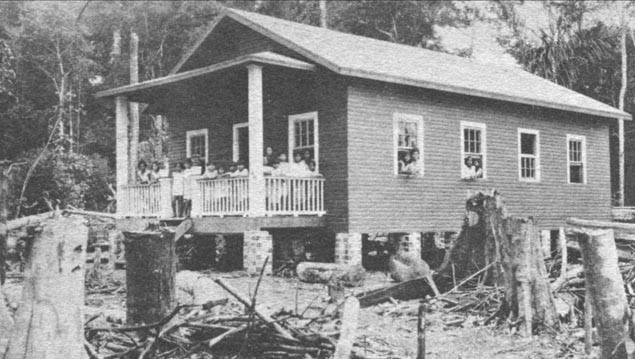
First Colombian public school in Leticia (1932).

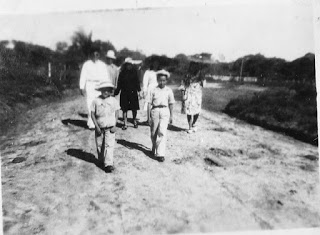
Street in Leticia, circa 1946.

After the armistice of 1933, Colombia began infrastructure and urban planning works in the small hamlet of Leticia. The recent conflict had aroused real interest in the area, represented in the true beginning of the Colombianization of those areas.

At the educational level, the construction of a school for boys and another for women began. They were very precarious facilities; However, the real concern was the high number of Peruvian students, an aspect that made the implementation of Colombian education difficult. In 1932, 373 Peruvians and 77 Colombians lived together in Leticia. Educator Gabriela Marín relates the following:

In the midst of resentment and difficulties, I began to organize my teaching work, parents and children did not like me because I was Colombian [...]; Three subjects [were] not accepted: the history of the country, the geography of Colombia and the national anthem; this one I had to sing alone, [...] to avoid further trouble I suggested that they sing their national anthem and I would stand up honoring their country and that when I sang mine, they would do the same.

The situation began to change with the passage of time. In 1937, 738 Colombians, 328 Brazilians, 277 Peruvians and 25 people of other nationalities were living in the area.

In the ecclesiastical sphere, Leticia depended on the Apostolic Prefecture of San León del Amazonas, which was based in Iquitos, even in 1932. Later on, it would depend on the Vicariate of Caquetá and Putumayo, a Colombian ecclesiastical division. In 1951, the Apostolic Vicariate of Leticia would be finally formed.

== See also ==
- Chilenization of Tacna, Arica and Tarapacá
- Colombia–Peru relations
- Colombia–Peru War
- Population exchange between Greece and Turkey
- Putumayo Genocide
- Salomón-Lozano Treaty
