= List of regional intendants of Chile =

== Intendants ==
Regional intendants
Region	Name	Assumed office
Arica y Parinacota	Roberto Erpel Seguel (UDI)	2 September 2019
Tarapacá	Miguel Ángel Quezada (UDI)	11 March 2018
Antofagasta	Edgar Blanco Rand (RN)	22 October 2019
Atacama	Patricio Urquieta García (RN)	18 March 2019
Coquimbo	Lucía Pinto (UDI)	11 March 2018
Valparaíso	Jorge Martínez Durán (RN)	11 March 2018
Santiago Metropolitan	Felipe Guevara Stephens (RN)	30 October 2019
O'Higgins	Juan Manuel Masferrer (UDI)	11 March 2018
Maule	Pablo Milad (Evópoli)	11 March 2018
Ñuble	Martín Arrau (Independent)	6 September 2018
Biobío	Sergio Giacaman García (UDI)	16 April 2019
Araucanía	Víctor Manoli (RN)	20 December 2019
Los Ríos	César Asenjo Jerez (Independent)	11 March 2018
Los Lagos	Harry Jürgensen Caesar (RN)	11 March 2018
Aysén	Geoconda Navarrete (Evópoli)	11 March 2018
Magallanes	José Fernández Dübrock (Independent)	13 February 2019

== See also ==
- Regions of Chile
