= Chilenization of Tacna, Arica and Tarapacá =

Chilean transculturation process in Tacna, Arica and Tarapacá

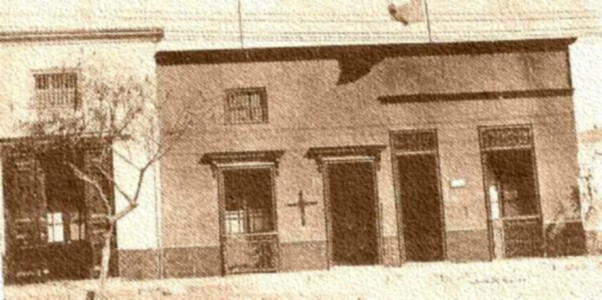
Black cross painted with tar by Chilean Mazorqueros, on a Peruvian household in Tacna. In the background a Chilean flag.

The Chilenization of Tacna, Arica, and Tarapacá refers to a process of forced acculturation implemented by Chile in the former Peruvian territories of Tacna, Arica, and Tarapacá following their occupation during the War of the Pacific (1879–1883). The primary objective was to assert Chilean cultural and national identity in these regions, which had previously been part of Peru.

The process involved a range of measures aimed at weakening Peruvian influence and consolidating Chilean control. These included the closure of Peruvian-run schools, the expulsion of Peruvian clergy and interference in religious institutions, the expansion of Chile's military presence into civilian areas such as Tacna, the promotion of Chilean media and propaganda, restrictions on Peruvian press and political activities, and a policy of encouraging Chilean colonization.

Chile's refusal to ratify the Billinghurst-Latorre Protocol, which had aimed to resolve the status of Tacna and Arica, marked the beginning of systematic Chilenization efforts in those provinces. Some historians also note that British economic interests—particularly the unification of saltpeter mining operations under a single political authority—played a role in influencing the outcome of the war and its aftermath.

== Background ==
Starting from the Chilean silver rush in the 1830s, Atacama (a Bolivian region) was prospected and populated by Chileans backed by Chilean and European (mainly British) capital. Chilean and foreign enterprises in the region eventually extended their control to the Bolivian saltpeter mines. During the 1870s, Peru capitalized on the guano exploitation and nationalized all industries in Tarapacá, but Bolivian enterprises in its territory remained in private hands. Peru controlled 58.8% of all saltpeter production, while Chile held 19% and the United Kingdom 13.5%.

According to the 1876 census, Peruvians represented the majority of the population in Tarapacá, followed by Chileans and Bolivians. Conflicts between Chilean and Bolivian miners were common in Peruvian saltpeterworks. However, there was no dispute about the Peruvian sovereignty of this territory. In fact, before the war, Peru's southern border was with Bolivia and not Chile.

After the War of the Pacific and the Treaty of Ancón, the Department of Tarapacá was given unconditionally to Chile, with Moqueguan Tacna and Arica being awarded to Chile being reorganized into the new Tacna Province, under the condition that a plebiscite be carried out ten years down the line. Such a plebiscite would never take place, however.

== Peruvian and Chilean activity ==
=== Territorial administration ===
In 1884, the Tacna Province was created by Chile, being divided into three Departments: Tarata, Tacna, and Arica. The Tarapacá Province was also created, being divided into the departments of Pisagua and Tarapacá (after 1927 Iquique). Chilean government institutions were put into place, and streets were renamed:

City	Peruvian name	Current name
Tacna	Alameda	Baquedano
Tacna	28 de Julio	26 de Mayo
Tacna	Matriz	Prat
Tacna	2 de Mayo	General del Canto
Tacna	Siete Vueltas	Carrera Pinto
Arica	7 de Enero	7 de Junio
Arica	Calle del Telégrafo	Arturo Prat
Arica	Chucuito	Pasaje Sangra
Arica	Nueva Calle de la Matriz	Baquedano
Arica	Bidaubique	Patricio Lynch
Arica	Zapata	General Lagos
Arica	Prado	Blanco Encalada
Arica	Ayacucho	Yungay
Arica	28 de Julio	Rafael Sotomayor
Arica	Atahualpa (as well as its extension Maipú)	Maipo
Arica	2 de Mayo	21 de Mayo
Arica	Bolognesi	General Velásquez
Iquique	Tacna	Obispo Labbé
Iquique	Zela	Luis Uribe
Iquique	Arequipa & 2 de Mayo	Patricio Lynch
Iquique	Junín	Eleuterio Ramírez
Iquique	Ayacucho	Bartolomé Vivar
Iquique	Puno	Barros Arana
Iquique	Hospital	Amunátegui
Iquique	Cavancha	Juan Martínez
Iquique	Cajamarca	Sotomayor
Iquique	Santa Rosa & Vigil	Esmeralda
Iquique	Lima & Tarata	Ignacio Serrano
Iquique	Calle Nueva	Manuel Thomson
Iquique	Ancash	Latorre & Riquelme
Iquique	Ucayali	Alejandro Gorostiaga
Iquique	Marañón	Arturo Wilson
Iquique	Huancavelica	Baquedano
Iquique	Tumbes	Manuel Orella
Iquique	Camiña	Pedro Lagos
Iquique	La Libertad	Covadonga
Iquique	Pichincha	Roberto Souper (today Arturo Prat)
Iquique	Plaza del Reloj	Plaza Arturo Prat
Iquique	Plaza Mercado	Plaza Carlos Condell
Iquique	Plaza Escuela Taller	Plaza Manuel Montt (today Mercado Centenario)

Discrimination against the Peruvian population was notorious in the public works promoted by the Chilean government such as one that harmed the oasis of Pica and the nearby valleys of Quisma and Matilla, since their waters were expropriated to supply Iquique. Chileanization did not have a positive effect on the already existing population, as the Chilean newspaper La Voz de Valparaíso noted:

One generation has replaced another in Alsace and Lorraine, and despite this and despite the talent and discretion of German politicians, French sentiment still animates those provinces. And we believe that with a few houses and buildings, with the presence of a Court, with the presence of some journalists and some Chilean authorities, we can Chileanize Tacna and Arica, where Peruvian sentiment remains in continuous tension and today is much more alive and ardent than before […] It seems that there is plenty of time to be disappointed, to know that in all these attempts at Chileanization, the only thing that is Chileanized is the Treasury's money, and it is even Peruvianized, since the expenses then become improvements to cities that can finally pass to the power of Peru, without any benefit for us.

The process of Chileanization of Tacna and Arica was directly related to the negotiations for the plebiscite established in the Treaty of Ancón.

=== Education ===
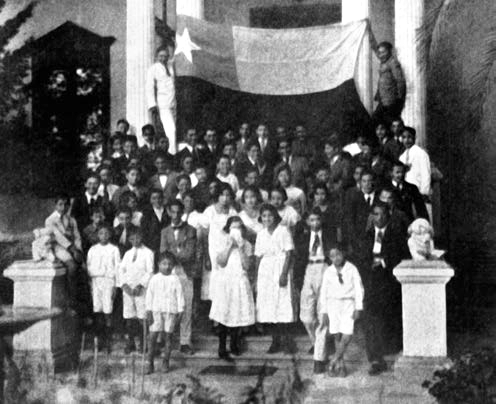
Children from Tacna paying respect to the Chilean national flag

Chileanization was sponsored by the Chilean government, where classes were held with Chilean textbooks, and where disciplines such as gymnastics, pre-military exercises, and school shooting were emphasized. In contrast, the Peruvians of Tacna, Arica and Tarapacá created and maintained their own schools, in order to instill Peruvian values in their children.

The president of Peru Nicolás de Piérola entrusted writer Modesto Molina with the organization of private schools in Tacna and Arica. Oswaldo Zeballos Ortiz, director of the "Peruvian School of Arica" expressed to his students, on 23 December 1899:

Study, so that by lifting the veil of national history, you may also become better children of her; she who today more than she never needs your help, her most favorite children, who can take her out of the abyss of misfortunes where the envy of those outside [our lands] and the perverse and ill-intentioned ambition of those inside [our lands] will throw her.

At the beginning of the year 1900, the Chilean government decided to close all Peruvian schools. In June of the same year, materials arrived for the Chilean public schools that would be created in the territories of Tacna and Arica, and which began operating on 1 March 1901. Faced with the measure adopted by the Chilean authorities, the Peruvian inhabitants decided to create clandestine education centers. Thus, for example, the Peruvian historian Jorge Basadre had to study in a clandestine school called "Santa Rosa", directed by the Peruvian Carlota Pinto de Gamallo, using the Chilean text of José Abelardo Núñez, until he traveled to Lima aged nine. Valparaíso's La Unión newspaper noted:

After fifteen years we have remembered that we should Chileanize Tacna and Arica, that is, that we should win it for the good of our territory […] it was fair and correct to suppress the schools maintained by the Peruvian government […] it was correct and legal to suppress those that publicly maintained a foreign government and subject the rest to Chilean plans and texts; while not suppressing them all. These teachers will not stop teaching now in private homes and their teaching will certainly not be favorable to Chile.

In all lyceums, Peruvian students were forced to wear a Chilean cockade and sing the Chilean national anthem.

=== Military ===
Chile established compulsory military service in September 1900, through Law No. 1,362, on "Recruits and Replacements of the Army and Navy", which established compulsory conscription for men between 20 and 45 years of age, for a period of one year.

The Chilean authorities applied such regulations on the provinces of Tacna, Arica and Tarapacá. The Supreme Court of Chile, in October 1917, when resolving an appeal in the fund filed by young children of Peruvians born in the province of Tacna, considered that the territories of Tacna and Arica were fully subject to Chilean sovereignty and formed an integral part of its territory and that, therefore, people born there after the conclusion of the Ancón Treaty, even if they were children of Peruvians, were Chileans and had to comply with the obligations imposed on them by the law on army recruits and replacements. Therefore, young Peruvians living in the Tacna and Arica area were recruited and sent to Santiago to serve in the Chilean Army. As a result, in order not to perform military service, Peruvian men within the conscription age range began to leave the area, declining in population the cities of Tacna and Arica and turning them into cities inhabited by Peruvian women, the elderly, and children. Similar situations also occurred in Tarapacá, although on a smaller scale and in a different context. In Tarapacá, the population of Peruvian origin was not the majority and Peru had relinquished its sovereignty over the area according to the Treaty of Ancón.

By 1919 in Tacna, due to conscription for military service, of the 19,000 remaining inhabitants, 8,000 were Chilean military; for this reason, many women from Tacna remained single. This scenario is described in the play La Senorita de Tacna by Mario Vargas Llosa, based on the experiences of his aunt Mamaé (where he relates how "Elvira" has a sentimental relationship with "Joaquín", a Chilean officer, reading verses by the poet Federico Barreto).

=== Religion ===
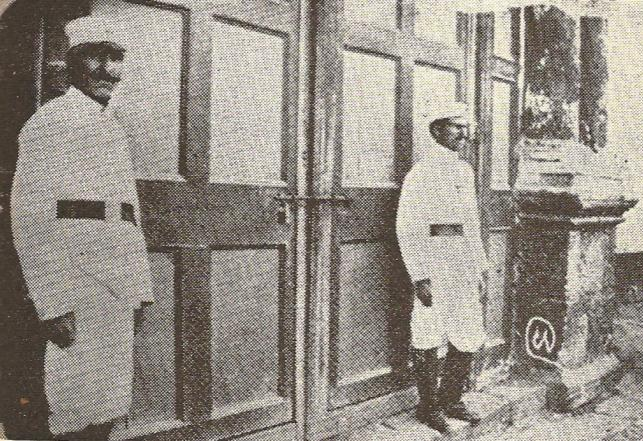
Closure of San Ramón Church in 1909

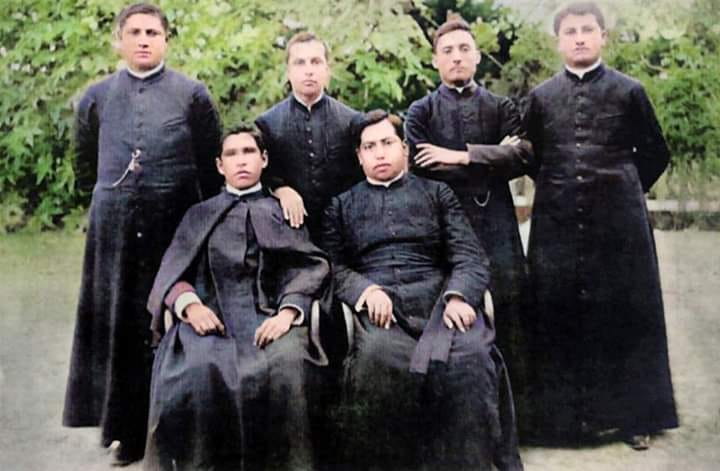
Peruvian priests expelled from Tacna and Arica (1910)

In ecclesiastical matters, although owned by Chile, the territories of Tacna and Arica continued to depend on the Diocese of Arequipa, in Peru, as had been ordered by the Holy See. Peruvian priests used their position to keep their attachment to their homeland alive, through the use of the pulpit. The preaching and the sermon were projected in the homes to the Peruvian citizens, who in social gatherings, pamphlets and civic events also showed their identification with their national origin.

In 1909, a secret document was circulated, prepared by a Chilean Special Consultative Commission, which recommended, in order to secure the territories of Tacna and Arica for itself, to "[…] expel the Peruvian priests and replace them with other Chilean ones." Soon after, in order to dismantle the nationalism of the Peruvians, Chile chose to replace the priests of Peruvian origin, beginning with the parish priests. This policy would have repercussions on the relations between the Holy See and the Chilean government and would generate the incidents between the FECh and Monsignor Sibilia, the papal nuncio in 1913.

The mayor of Tacna, Máximo Lira, on 27 February 1910, decreed the expulsion of such priests, in compliance with the orders issued by the minister Agustín Edwards Mac-Clure; They were detained at the police station by the prefect Manuel Barahona and, on the following 15 March, guarded by nine police officers, they were taken to Sama. The expelled priests were: José María Flores Mextre (parish priest of Tacna); Juan Vitaliano Berroa (parish priest of Arica); Francisco Quiroz (priest of Tacna); José Mariano Indacochea Zeballos (priest of Codpa); José Félix Cáceres (priest of Tarata); Juan Gualberto Guevara (auxiliary of the Arica parish, who later was cardinal and archbishop of Lima); Esteban Toccafondi (priest of Sama). This fact motivated a new break in diplomatic relations between Peru and Chile.

On the other hand, when the military chaplains of Chile assumed part of the task of creating feelings of Chileanness in the region, the celebration of the Virgen de las Peñas festival was prohibited, promoting its replacement by the veneration of the Virgen del Carmen. patron of the Chilean Army. Likewise, the Fiesta de La Tirana, a religious celebration of Aymara origin, which at the end of the 19th century was held on various dates - 6 August for Bolivians, 28 July for Peruvians, and July 16 for the Chileans–, around 1910, it was included in the Chilean calendar, setting a single day for it: 16 July evoking the Virgen del Carmen; being affected in this way the old brotherhoods of Peruvian and Bolivian origin.

=== Lodges and civil organizations ===
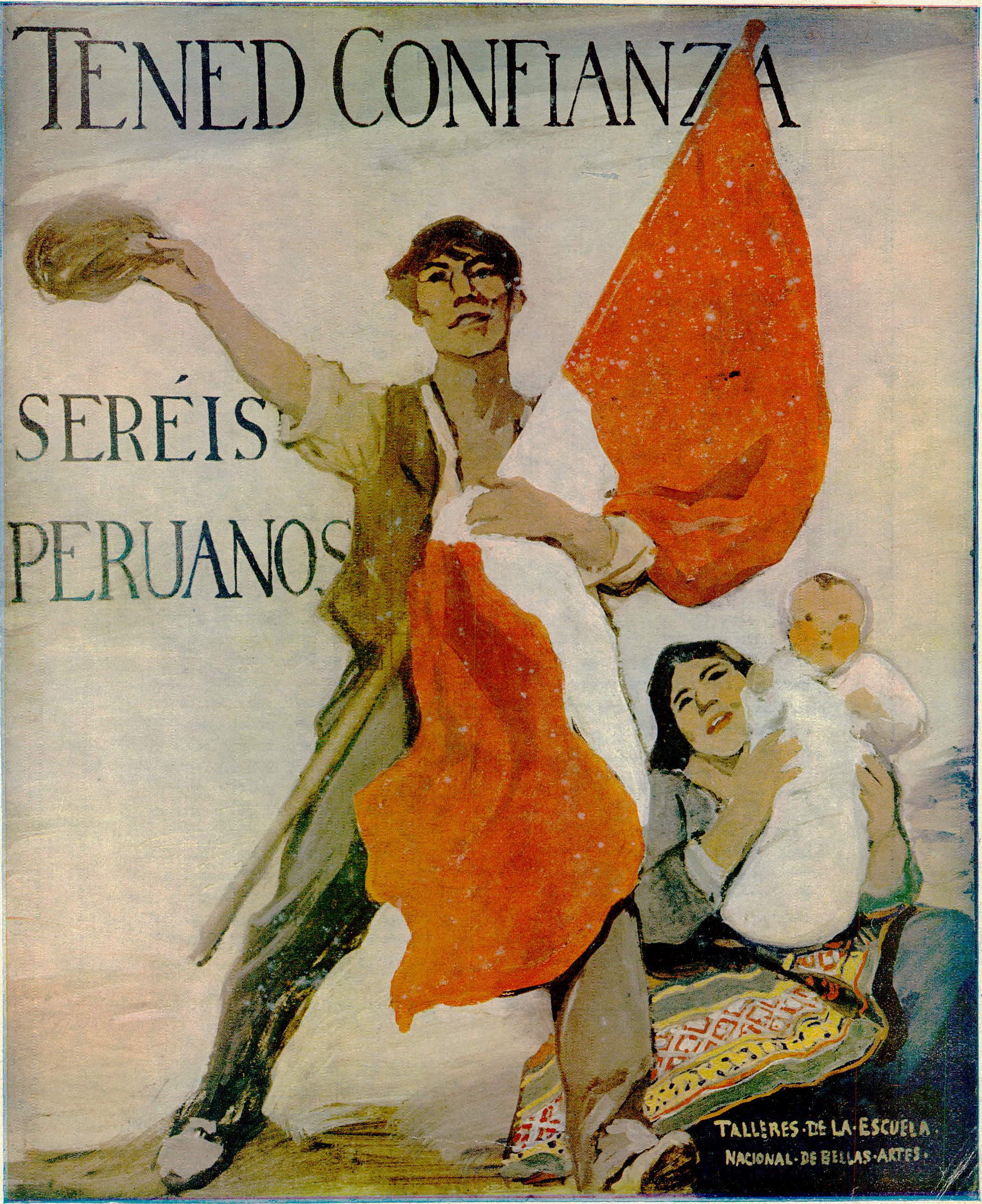
Peruvian propaganda poster: Have confidence – you will be Peruvian

The Peruvian inhabitants, in order to preserve the national values in the areas owned by Chile, and promote the collection of funds for the eventual payment, stipulated in the Treaty of Ancón, established various associations and Masonic lodges.

In 1893 the Peruvian lodge "Constancia y Concordia" was created in Tacna, presided over by Rómulo Cúneo y Vidal. Towards 1898 there were in Arica the Peruvian lodges "Morro de Arica" No.12, dependent on the Supreme Confederate Council of Peru and "Universal Fraternity" No.20, dependent on the Grand Lodge of Peru.

On the other hand, in the area of Tarapacá, under Chilean rule, Peruvian lodges were also formed. Thus, for example, in Iquique the lodges "Fraternidad y Progreso" No.9, "Unión Fraternal" No.13, and in Pisagua, the symbolic lodge "Caridad" No.15, founded in 1894 by Alfredo Corrales, dependent on the Supreme Confederate Council of Peru. The latter came under the control of the Grand Lodge of Chile, as "Caridad" No.26, on 31 December 1896.

On 25 October 1897, José M. Trucios asked the Peruvian Lodge "Morro de Arica" No.12 for its documentation in order to incorporate it into the Grand Lodge of Chile; On which it came to depend on 28 February 1898, under No.29.

In July 1901, the "Naval Ladies League" was founded in Arica to contribute to the collection carried out in Lima for the purchase of a warship. From April 1900, the Arica lodges "Universal Fraternity" and "Morro de Arica" and the Tacnean "Constancia y Concordia" began to hold joint meetings, encouraged by the Grand Lodge of Peru.

In 1904, the lodge "Universal Fraternity" No.20 ended its activities, with Julio Arturo Ego-Aguirre being its last president, recognizing that it was threatened by dangers which it had to face. The lodge "Morro de Arica" No.29, due to the death of some of its members, the abandonment of the city by others and the disconnection with the Peruvian central, also ended its activities in 1904. The remaining members joined the lodge of Tacna "Constancia y Concordia".

=== Patriotic Leagues ===
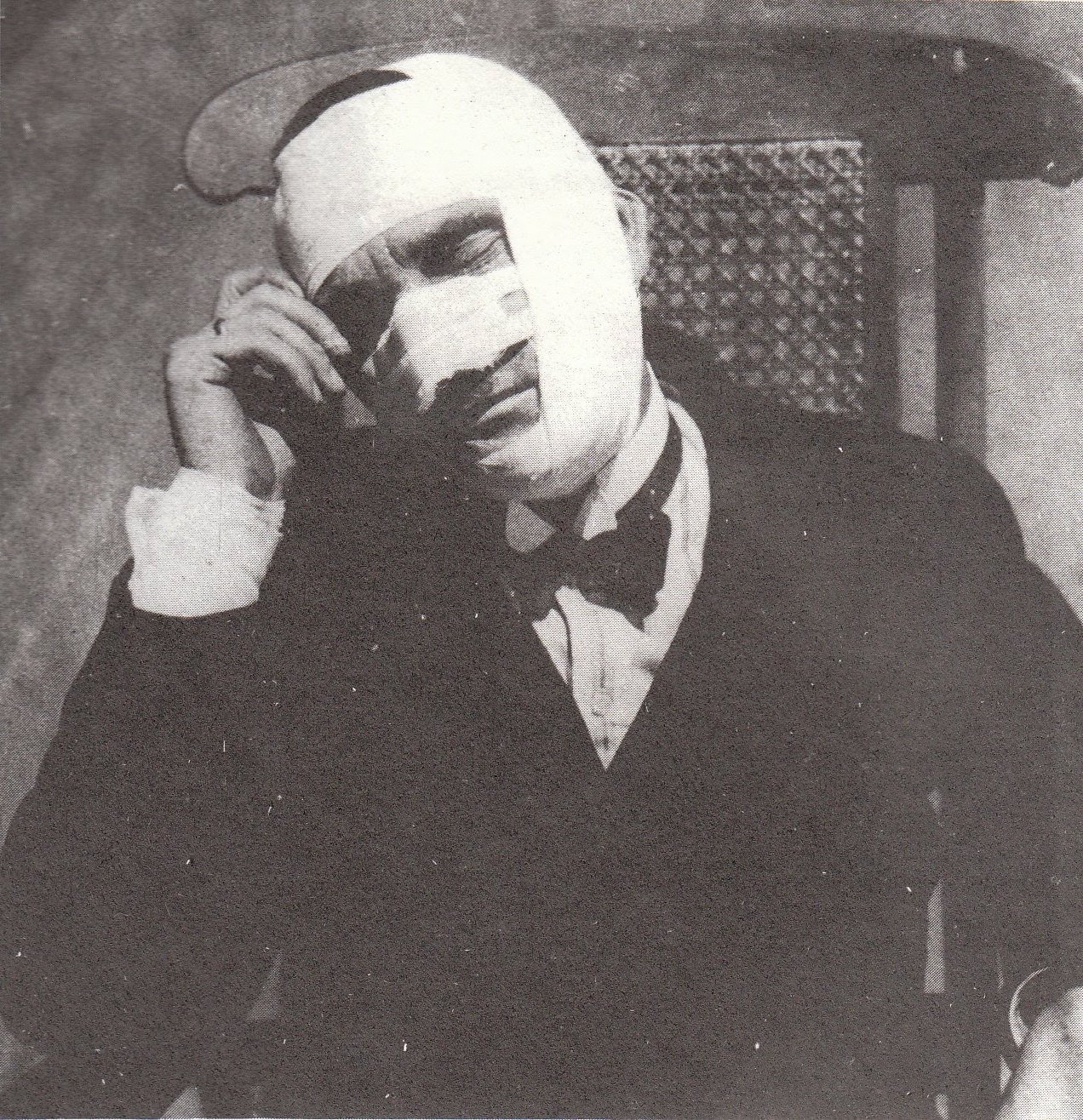
Peruvian writer Jorge Basadre after being attacked with a rock by Chileans opposed to a plebiscite, 15 May 1926

In 1909 Chilean ultra-nationalist civil organizations were created, called patriotic leagues, with names such as "Mano Negra", "Mazorqueros", "Sociedad Estrella de Chile", "Patriotic League of Tacna", which persecuted the Peruvians, setting fire to houses, schools, newspapers, clubs, shops and brothels. The paramilitaries, under an alleged protection of the Chilean government, committed murders, disappearances, and expelled Peruvian inhabitants. They promoted their actions through flyers such as "El Eco Patrio", "El Ajicito", "El Corvo", "El Roto Chileno", "La Liga Patriótica", "El Chileno", "El Lucas Gómez", "El Plebiscito".

The Chilean government tried to dissolve these organizations in 1912, but did not achieve its objective. In 1919 Belisario Salinas, of the Patriotic League of Antofagasta, proposed, in order to replace the Peruvian and Bolivian values with the Chilean ones, to promote the celebration of the battles of Maipú and La Concepción, removing Peruvian flags from the Peruvian consulate in Iquique on 28 July.

Regarding the Tarapacá area, Lautaro Núñez Atencio, an archaeologist from Iquique descended from Peruvians and winner of the Chilean National History Award, points out that "[…] organized groups known as the Patriotic Leagues provoked the expulsion of Peruvians through actions where violence was the main instrument. Murders, robberies, discrimination and abuses of all kinds, were a thing of every day […] it is clear that these are dramatic events that occurred in the Tarapacá region, as if that captive god before the Incas, the mischievous Tarapacá, would have forever marked the captive destiny of the region […] This time captive in the provinces that became Chilean and fell into the hands of xenophobic demons […] ".

The Federation of Students of the University of Chile openly criticized the jingoism, xenophobia and militarism in its official magazine "Claridad". Their position was the return of Tacna and Arica to Peru. When they condemned the Chilean government for the absurd mobilization called the War of Don Ladislao just to distract citizens' attention, on 21 July 1920 its headquarters was attacked and destroyed by nationalist groups and its leaders were arrested.

=== Press ===
Newspapers published in Tacna and Arica highlighted Peruvian patriotic values, some of which came to be closed down by the Chilean authority. Meanwhile, newspapers published by Chileans in the area were used to promote Chileanization and attack the editors of Peruvian newspapers.

On the role of the press, in the newspaper La Unión de Valparaíso, in March 1901, it was stated that:

Not two years ago a newspaper was founded to help Chileanize Tacna. But its editors often get into discussions and polemics. With a white glove. Collective offenses against the society of Tacna have been published in that newspaper, which would have justified a popular riot. Now, for no tacneno it is a mystery the role that the Chilean administration secretly plays in that newspaper.

=== Administration ===
Article 3 of the Ancón Treaty provided that the provinces of Tacna and Arica, although legally Peruvian, would remain in the possession of the Chilean State for ten years, after which a popular plebiscite would determine their fate.

While some organizations and individuals supported the forced assimilation, others rejected it. In 1921 Dr. Carlos Vicuña Fuentes, at that time a member of the Radical Party of Chile, expressed himself thus before a large political assembly in Santiago:

We all know that Tacna and Arica are not historically Chilean, that they are not populated by Chileans, that we have them in our possession irregularly, by virtue of the Ancón treaty that we have not wanted to comply with, and that we have imposed there a disgraceful regime of tyranny with the naive desire to Chileanize the provinces by force. Let's analyze if the conservation of this warrior prey is worth the sacrifices it costs us. The alleged Chileanization of Tacna and Arica costs fabulous sums, perhaps more than five hundred million pesos, coming from all the Ministries, and mostly through the secret channels of the Ministry of Foreign Relations. And all those millions have been spent in making us hate, in criminal persecutions, in the poison of lies and injustice and in unworthy orgies. The Chilean administration has been the emblem of all tyrannies there, from the muzzling of opinion and the persecution of Peruvian priests, to the outrage of commerce. In the bay of Arica, free men could not do the work of the stevedores and freight forwarders, the loading and unloading was done with troops from the regiments stationed there, a troop that had the infamous slogan of throwing into the sea one of every two packages. who came from Peru, in this unprecedented policy of hatred our wise men and our statesmen spent the millions of the Nation.

However, by the time the historian Benjamín Vicuña Mackenna pronounced his famous phrase "Do not let go of the Morro" (Spanish: No soltéis el Morro), which fellow historian Gonzalo Bulnes considered a historical cry, the definitive annexation of Tacna and especially Arica had become the majority's opinion in Chilean society.

== Events ==
=== Tacna ===
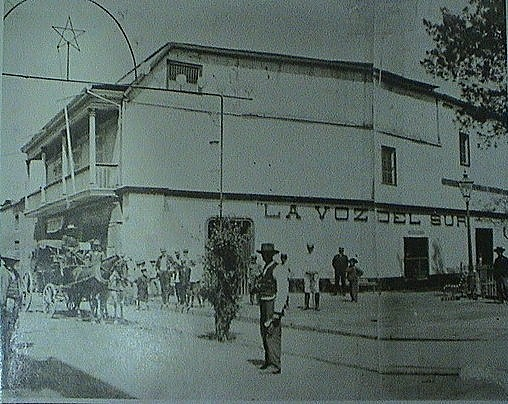
La Voz del Sur newspaper in Tacna

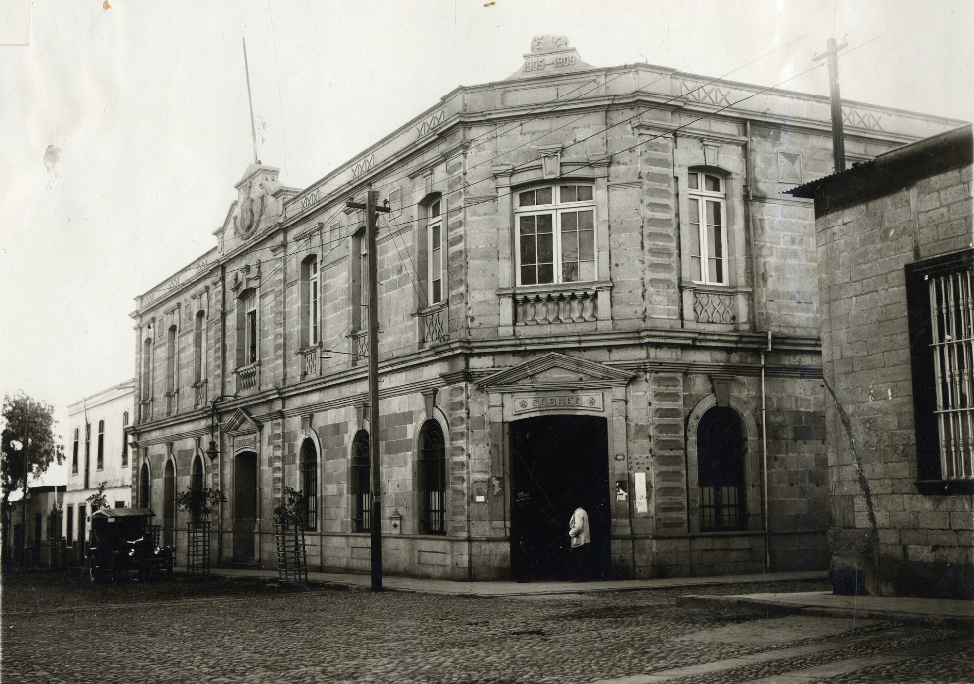
Old Post Office and Intendency building in Tacna

The Bank of Tacna, which, closed in 1880 due to the war, reopened in 1884 under Chilean legislation, but its banknotes circulated stamped as Bolivians. The bank was liquidated on 7 April 1921 in accordance with Chilean policy.

Andrés Freyre's La Revista del Sur, published since 1866 in Tacna, was closed by order of the Chilean authority in 1880. In 1882 El Tacora appeared, from the same family. El Tacora by Roberto Freyre Arias, was the Peruvian newspaper that published criticism of the Chilean military, administrative and judicial authorities. An insert of this newspaper published in 1902 the Anthem of Tacna that Modesto Molina wrote in 1886.

On 9 February 1900, private schools in Tacna were closed under the "Primary Instruction Law of 1860." The closure led to the creation of clandestine schools that operated in Peruvian homes.

On 28 November 1910, a group of assailants attacked the Freyre family, looted the printing press and the family's house that was two blocks from the police headquarters on San Martín Street. The next morning, the residents of Alameda and San Martín streets collaborated with the Freyres to rebuild the printing press. The printing press was partially rebuilt.

The Chilean paramilitary group known as Los Mazorqueros expelled Peruvians and painted a black cross on their houses. In some shops, products were not sold to Peruvians. Peruvian patriotic celebrations were prohibited in Tacna and Arica, but not foreign ones such as Italian ones.

The Peruvian population channeled through Manuel Portocarrero the complaints of intimidation, disappearances and deportations, which he took to the Plebiscitary Commission. In January 1925, General Pershing explained to the Commission that 710 deportations of Peruvians had been carried out, as in the English ship Ebro, sending Peruvians south of Arica. On 2 June 1926, the American ambassador William Collier collected the information that 250 Peruvians from Tacna and Arica lived in Santiago against his will. The intimidations caused others to take refuge in the Ucayali ship, in the Delegation of Limits, in Bolivia or north of the Sama river in Peru.

On 19 November 1925, a group of residents of the Aymara community of Challaviento murdered three Chilean police officers and set fire to the Chilean barracks in the area. The community members of Challaviento accused the police of having raped a young woman and of murdering a Bolivian resident who served as mayor. Fearing reprisals, the Aymara communities of Toquela, Palquilla, Ataspaca, Caplina and Challaviento decided to withdraw north towards Peruvian territory.

On 6 January 1926, two hundred and fifty Chilean nationalists attacked Peruvians involved in the plebiscite. Admiral Gómez Carreño, Chilean Mayor of Tacna and collaborator, was also attacked. These events took place in front of the local police, without the aggressors receiving sanction. Similar events occurred on 5 March 1926, where the aggressors were supported by conspirators from Santiago.

In 1927, the government of Peru granted a loan of £2,000 to pay for the damages suffered in Tacna by the owner of a pharmacy set on fire by a Chilean mob.

Near the date of the plebiscite, the Chileanization caused the forced disappearance of Peruvians in Tacna, Tarata, Arica and their neighboring towns. This list was delivered to the U.S. arbitrator through the Peruvian Foreign Ministry. Monuments and commemorative plaques have been erected in Tacna and Tarata in memory of the disappeared in the plebiscitary days.

This process affected the registration of voters for the plebiscite, for which the United States Secretary Frank Billings Kellogg decided that there would be no plebiscite; the reason: the conviction that it was impossible to celebrate the act if Chile exercised dominion in the disputed provinces.

The historian from Tacna Jorge Basadre tells that his aunt Elvira Basadre married the manager of the Banco de Chile in Tacna and they were the parents of Federico Dahl Basadre, the historian's first cousin and childhood companion. In 1925 the two cousins returned to vote in the plebiscite. From Santiago, Federico Dahl Basadre voted for Chile and from Lima, Jorge Basadre voted for Peru.

=== Arica ===
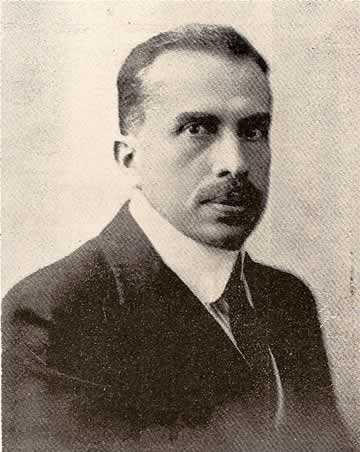
Federico Barreto, Peruvian poet

Arica in 1887 had two Peruvian schools, one for boys and one for girls, with 204 students enrolled in total. In May 1892 the Peruvian Charity Society inaugurated the Peruvian Night School with 6 students.

On 24 June 1894, the day of San Juan, the church of San Marcos de Arica had hoisted the Peruvian flag with the Masonic insignia, organized by the "Universal Fraternity" lodge. Both Peruvian and Chilean characters participated in the event.

In 1896, the "Escuela de Niños №1" operated in Arica, directed by the Peruvian Antonio Zambrano. In September 1896, Julio D. Moreno founded the private school for Primary Instruction on Ayacucho street 6041 and in March 1897 the Society of Ladies of Arica created the "Peruvian School for Girls" on San Marcos street No.5142, which later became I would call it "Colegio de Santa Rosa". In 1899, Osvaldo Zeballos Ortiz was the director of the "Escuela Peruana de Niños" which was run by the "Sociedad Peruana de Beneficencia de Arica", which had 104 students at the end of 1899.

The Ariqueño Guillermo Billinghurst was the one who supported the creation of the newspaper "La Voz del Sur" on 18 May 1893, which was directed by Ernesto Zapata, then by Modesto Molina and in 1898 by José María Barreto, Federico Barreto's brother. He emulated the style of the newspaper "El Comercio" that was published in Lima, accentuating Peruvian patriotic values, in contrast with the collaborationist "El Pacífico" newspaper.

The 28 July 1897 edition of the newspaper"Morro de Arica" published the statement:

We are in the sixteenth year of captivity, without seeing our beloved bicolor flying; day by day drinking the cup of the most cruel misfortune.

The Peruvian national holidays, organized by the Peruvian Society of Charity, were celebrated with parades, speeches and other public events until July 30, and were attended by the Chilean authorities. The holiday of 18 September 1897 was also celebrated by the Chilean administration. The newspaper "Morro de Arica" published:

We congratulate the Chilean colony of this port for the dignified manner in which it has celebrated the anniversary of its homeland.

Until 1899, the independence of Peru was normally celebrated on 28 July the independence of Chile on 18 September and 20 September, celebrated by the Italian colony in Tacna and Arica.

In 1900, two ships arrived in Arica: the Almirante Cochrane and the Mutilla, which carried out military exercises until August.

The governor of Arica, Manuel Montt, prohibited the celebrations of the independence of Peru on 28 July 1900. The newspaper Morro de Arica published:

Today we will not celebrate the anniversary of our political emancipation with the splendor of other years, contenting ourselves with raising an altar to the homeland in the deepest recesses of our hearts and in the silence that has been imposed on us.

In Tacna, in August 1900, a military priest came from Santiago to perform public masses, as well as masses in the Arica hospital. The churches belonged to the dioceses of Tacna and Arica, which continued to depend on the Archdiocese of Arequipa.

On 23 January 1901, the first Chilean families began to arrive in Arica on the steamer Chile in order for them to settle in the city and employ Chilean workers in the port before the Peruvian population. The new Chilean day laborers earned 300% more than the Peruvian dismissed workers and this affected the commerce of Tacna and Arica. The measure was unpopular and was echoed in the Chilean press that stated If that province should be Chilean, it must be done by the only possible way: not to create a deeply hateful situation for Chileans, but to unify both parts of the population in works and demonstrations. of benefit and common taste. The measure imposing the monopoly was rejected.

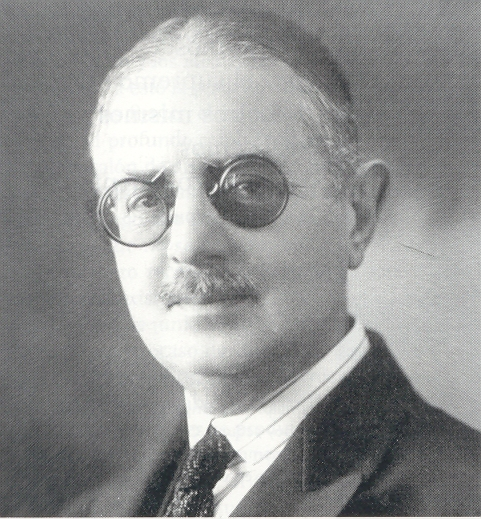
Salvador Allende Castro, father of Salvador Allende

The Peruvian national holidays were also not celebrated on 28 July 1901. The Morro de Arica newspaper published a poem by Enrique del Piélago:

Let us then stand like the Roman, and let us lay our hand on our chests. Let us say to the Homeland without ceasing: That today her captive sons love their homeland more than ever, and while they live, It is only she who they will be able to love.

On 18 July 1911, about eight hundred Chilean day laborers who worked on the Arica-La Paz railway, were in Tacna who attacked and destroyed in four hours, the Peruvian newspapers La Voz del Sur and El Tacora Then they entered the Club de la Unión where they destroyed the premises. The Freyre family, owners of La Voz del Sur, accused the lawyer Salvador Allende Castro of the incident.

Allende Castro was a radical and a Freemason who spread a poem called El Morro, using the words of a sonnet called El Altar del Sacrificio that the poet Federico Barreto had previously written from the Peruvian point of view. His son, future president Salvador Allende, studied at the Liceo de Tacna from 1910 to 1918 and performed his military service in the Lanceros de Tacna regiment in 1924.

Ariqueño Gerardo Vargas Hurtado was the founder of the newspaper El Ariqueño. The newspaper El Morro de Arica was founded in 1893 by Alfredo Corrales and Nicasio Ruiz de Olavarría. Both newspapers published in Arica highlighted Peruvian values. El Morro de Arica was published until 1911 when it was closed by the Chilean authority. His rival was the newspaper El Chilenito, founded by José Manuel Trucios.

=== Tarapacá ===
Before the war, in an official census of the government of Peru taken in 1876, it was established that the Chilean population in Tarapacá amounted to 9,664 people, equivalent to 25.28% of the total population of the area. By 1885, when the territory of Tarapacá had already been ceded to Chile by Peru, the General Census of the Population of Chile showed that 43.22% of the total population of Tarapacá was of Bolivian and Peruvian origin.

In 1891, young Peruvians from Tarapacá asked the government of Eduardo López de Romaña to subsidize scholarships at Peruvian national schools in the Department of Tarapacá. The Congress of Peru approved this request on 7 November 1891.

In 1910 there were Peruvian printing shops, schools, firefighters, clubs, mutuals, companies, lodges, and priests in Tarapacá that coexisted without difficulty with the Chilean population. The National Anthem of Peru continued to be heard. The beginning of the Chileanization took place with the emergence of the Patriotic Leagues that began the groundwork for an ethnic cleansing of the northern provinces of Chile.

In 1911 the Chilean government decreed the closure of Peruvian schools, and allowed the operation of a single educational center called Valparaíso High School, directed by Juan Eduardo Edmonson, who appealed to his English surname to continue his work. In 1922, five illegal Peruvian schools were still operating in Pica. Also in Tarapacá, a woman named María Vernal was accused of providing illegal private classes. Her permission was denied on the grounds that she promoted Peruvian values.

In 1926, the Peruvian teacher Ema Venegas in Alto San Antonio was accused of antipatriotism by not attending the celebration of 18 September as well as Haydee Murillo in Pica, whose teachings had to be monitored by the local authorities. Until 1930, the Chilean state had little concern in overseeing the educational work in Tarapacá.

The labor newspaper El Despertar de los Trabajadores by Luis Emilio Recabarren, Chilean union leader, was one of those that suffered the filling and fire at the hands of the patriotic leagues. The same would happen with the newspapers La Voz del Sur, El Tacora, El Ariqueño and El Morro de Arica, published in both Tacna and Arica.

At the end of April 1918, the Pro Patria Committee decreed in Iquique the expulsion of 40,000 Peruvians including the so-called "almost Chileans", born to Peruvian parents. A black cross on the door indicated that the committee was confiscating the property and the residents were being expelled from Tarapacá. The pamphlet called El Lucas Gómez began to publish death certificates for those who had not yet left the city.

The refugees arrived in El Callao and later formed the Tarapacá Urbanization. In Callao they were marginalized and treated as "Chileanized", again suffering discrimination from their compatriots, and they decided to go to Putumayo, San Martín, Ramón Castilla, Maynas and the Amazon Trapezoid. This last area would be ceded to Colombia under the Salomón-Lozano Treaty, which also would affect other settlements, with the original inhabitants moving south, re-forming their again lost homes.

== See also ==
- Treaty of Lima (1929)
- Patriotic Leagues (Southern Cone)
- Colombianization of Leticia, Putumayo and Caquetá
