= Anfión Muñoz =

Chilean politician

Anfión Muñoz Muñoz (1850 – c. 1920) was a Chilean political figure, who was the country's minister of industry and public works in 1904.

He was born in Chillán in 1850, the son of Francisco Muñoz and of Clorinda Muñoz. He completed his studies at the Instituto Nacional and graduated as a lawyer from the Universidad de Chile on June 10, 1875, marrying Isabel Lamas Benavente on April 24 of the same year.

In 1875, Muñoz was named secretary of the municipality of Bio Bio. He became intendant of Valdivia from 1881 to 1884, Talca from 1884 to 1886, Tarapacá from 1886 to 1887, and Coquimbo from 1887 to 1889. President José Manuel Balmaceda appointed him general inspector of colonization in 1889. As a member of the Partido Radical, he was elected as a deputy for Antofagasta, Taltal and Tocopilla in 1897, and in 1900 he was elected as a deputy for Temuco and Imperial.

Under President Germán Riesco, he was minister of industry and public works from June 1 to October 30, 1904.

Muñoz was also part of the Education and Welfare Commission and the Internal Police Commission.

Political offices
Preceded by Francisco de Borja Valdés	Minister of Industry and Public Works; 1904	Succeeded by Eduardo Charme
