= Department of Tarapacá (Peru) =

Department of Peru (1878–1883)

Tarapacá
- Department of Peru
- 1878–1883
- Flag of Peru

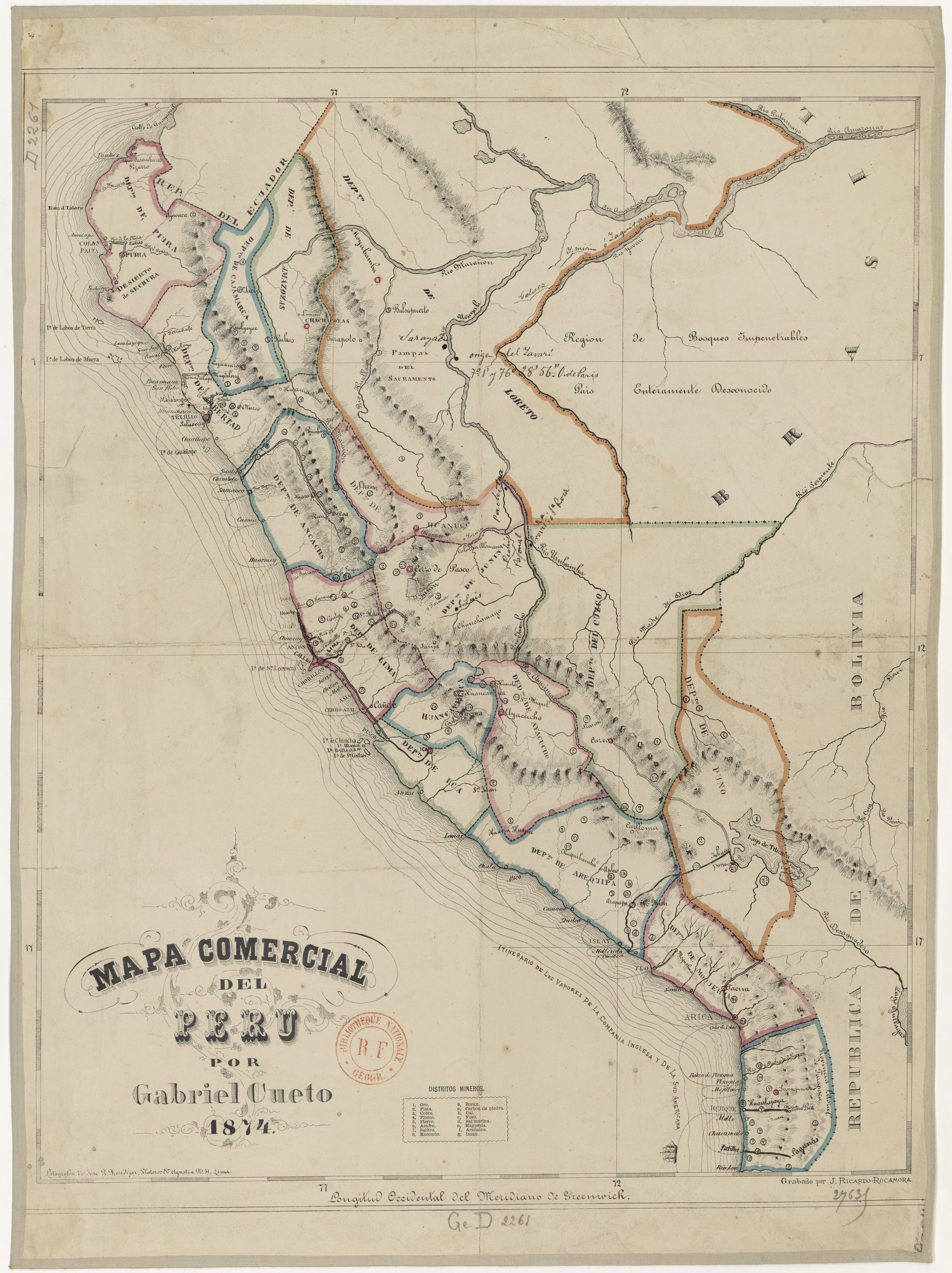
- Location of Tarapacá within Peru (1874)
- Capital: Iquique
- Demonym: Tarapacan (en); Tarapaqueño/a (es)
- Area
  - 1883: 69,000 km^{2} (27,000 sq mi)
- Historical era: War of the Pacific
  - Province created: 25 April 1837
  - Littoral Province: 1 December 1868
  - Status upgraded: 17 August 1878
  - Occupation starts: 2 November 1879
  - Treaty of Ancón: 20 October 1883
  - Province of Chile: 31 October 1884
- Contained within
  - Department: Littoral (1837–1853); Moquegua (1853–1868)
- Subdivisions
  - Type: Provinces
  - Units: Province of Iquique; Province of Tarapacá
Preceded by	Succeeded by
Department of Arequipa	Tarapacá Province
- Today part of: Chile

Tarapacá (Aymara: Tarapaka) was a department of Peru. Located in the country's then southernmost coast, it existed as a province from 1837 to 1878, when it was elevated to a department, after which it was occupied by Chile in 1879 and unconditionally ceded in 1883. Its capital was Iquique.

Tarapacá was created in 1837 as a province of the Littoral, a department of South Peru. The short-lived country became one of three constituent countries of the Peru–Bolivian Confederation, which was dissolved in 1839 following the War of the Confederation. It was later given autonomy as a littoral province in 1868, after which it was elevated to a department in 1878. Tarapacá was essential to the Peruvian nitrate monopoly, created by the Peruvian government in 1875 to capitalize on the high demand for nitrates at the time.

The political disputes that emerged over the territory of the Atacama Desert and its respective exploitation rights eventually led to war in 1879. The conflict, later known as the War of the Pacific, concluded with a Chilean military victory and the occupation of several areas of Peru and the Bolivian coast. Tarapacá had been occupied since 1879, starting with a landing operation on November 2, but was only formally ceded in 1883, with the signing of the Treaty of Ancón.

== Etymology ==
The department's name is of pre-Columbian origin, originally used to describe Viracocha, a local deity adored both by the Incans and their predecessors. It was first used by Diego de Almagro as a geographical term in 1536.

== History ==
Tarapacá within Arequipa in 1796.

Prior to the Spanish conquest of the Inca Empire, the area was part of the Qullasuyu, one of the empire's four regions or suyu. It was also part of the Colesuyu (or Colesuyo), an administrative division that differed from the aforementioned four subdivisions whose exact boundaries are disputed. According to historian María Rostworowski, it possibly comprised an area that reached from Camaná to Tarapacá, with a width of 20 to 30 leagues to the east of the Pacific Ocean.

The curaca (tribal chief) of the coastal region in Tarapacá of the Kingdom of Chucuito prior to the Spanish conquest was Felipe Lucaya.

The area was first explored and named by Diego de Almagro in late 1536 as part of his expedition that concluded the following year. In 1558, fellow conquistadors Jerónimo de Vivar and Pedro de Valdivia described the area as being located 37 leagues south of a path that began in the province of Tacna. In 1565, the corregimiento of San Marcos de Arica was created which, at the time, included Tarapacá.

In 1600, the parcels of Lluta, Arica, Azapa, Tarapacá were handed over to Pedro Mesia Cordova, who then handed over the valleys of Tácana and Sama. In 1612 Pope Paul V authorised the establishment of the Diocese of Arequipa in which were seven jurisdictions including the corregimiento of Arica, comprising the regions of Tacna, Tarata, Sama, Ilabaya, Locumba, Putina and Tarapacá.

The corregimiento of Tarapacá (Spanish: Corregimiento de Tarapacá) was established by Viceroy Manuel de Amat y Junyent in May 1768, separate from Arica and composed of four repartimientos: Camiña, Sibaya, Tarapacá and Pica.

=== History as a province ===
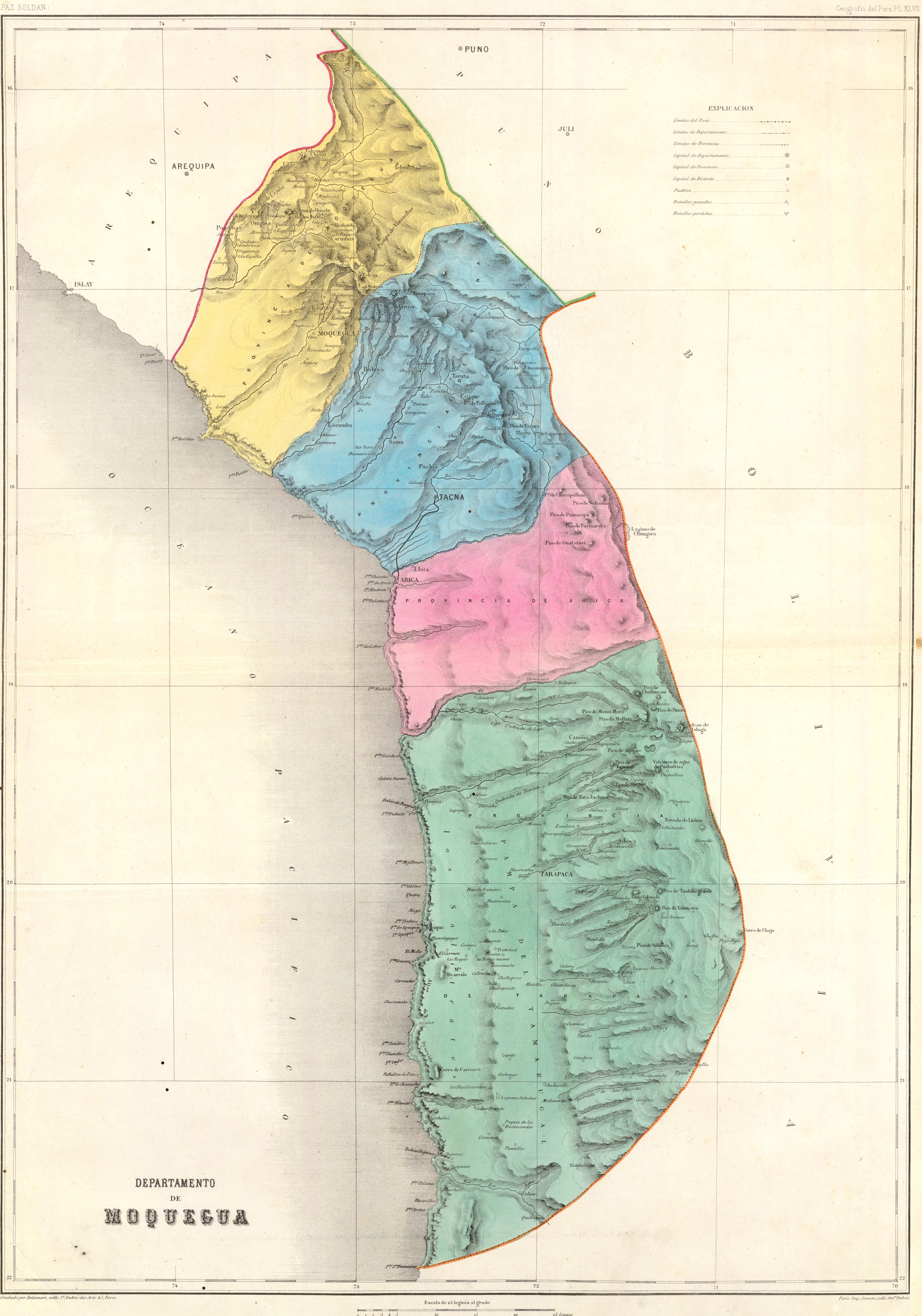
Tarapacá within Moquegua in 1865.

The Province of Tarapacá (Spanish: Provincia de Tarapacá) was created in 1837 as part of the Department of the Littoral, a subdivision of the Confederate state of South Peru. The newly formed department was created from territory originally belonging to the department of Arequipa, and also included the province of Tacna.

Following the War of the Confederation and the separation of Peruvian and Bolivian states, Peruvian president Agustín Gamarra invaded Bolivia seeking to annex to Lower Peru what once was Upper Peru. The invasion led to a full-scale war between both countries, which ended following Gamarra's defeat at the Battle of Ingavi in 1841 by General José Ballivián. Ballivián's troops occupied Puno, Moquegua, Tacna and Tarapacá, until Peruvian José María Lavaysen's troops from Sama defeated the invading army. In Locumba, Colonel Manuel de Mendiburu also organised forces, as well as Justo Arias Aragüez in 1842. In 1853, the Department of Moquegua was created. Its provinces included Tarapacá, Moquegua, Tacna, and Arica.

The Littoral Province of Tarapacá (Spanish: Provincia Litoral de Tarapacá) was established on December 1, 1868, through a law that separated it from the department of Moquegua and gave it equal status to the country's departments. This autonomous status lasted until 1878.

On August 9, 1873, the government of Peru passed the Organic Law of Municipalities (Spanish: Ley Orgánica de Municipalidades). On October 28 of the same year, a Municipal Council (Spanish: Consejo Municipal) was installed in the city of Iquique, composed of a mayor, a deputy mayor, and three regidores. This governing body functioned until December 31, 1875. Iquique was elevated to capital of the littoral province on February 23 of the same year, which meant that both the Departmental Council (Spanish: consejo departamental) and the Provincial Council (Spanish: consejo provincial) had to move to the city. The former was installed on January 3, 1876, and headed by Antonio Gutiérrez de la Fuente. The latter, headed by Alfonso Ugarte, followed suit the day after. Modesto Molina Paniagua served as prefect of Tarapacá until 1876.

=== History as a department ===
On August 17, 1878, the littoral province was elevated to a department. This newly formed subdivision was established with two provinces: Tarapacá and Iquique. Both provinces' capital cities were their respective settlements of the same name. The province of Iquique was composed of the department's flat terrain, while Tarapacá was composed of the more rough and mountainous part.

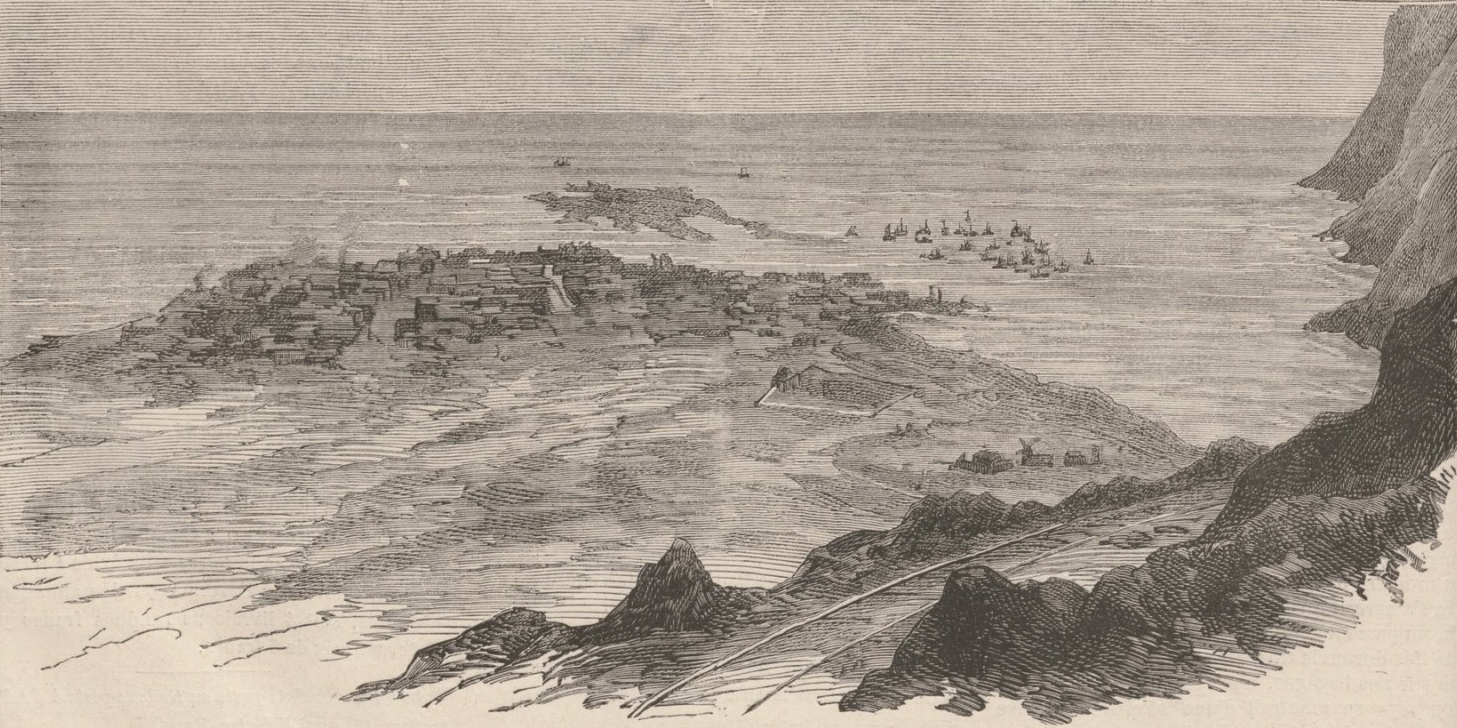
The Blockade of Iquique in 1879.

The department was the first Peruvian territory to be affected by the War of the Pacific, as the Chilean Navy began a blockade of the port of Iquique soon after war was declared between both countries. The blockade was ultimately unsuccessful, however, and served as a prelude to a ground action that would eventually lead to the military occupation of key areas in the country.

An amphibious assault on the port city of Pisagua that took place on November 2, 1879, marked the beginning of the Chilean Army's occupation of the department. The military action that would later become known as the Tarapacá campaign concluded with the battle of Tarapacá. Despite a military victory by the Peruvian Army, a strategic withdrawal was deemed necessary, after which the department was occupied by the Chilean Army by the end of the year.

Following the Chilean victory in the conflict, the department was formally ceded to Chile on October 20, 1883, through the Treaty of Ancón. The territory was then formally integrated into Chile on October 31, 1884, through the creation of Tarapacá Department.

== Geography ==
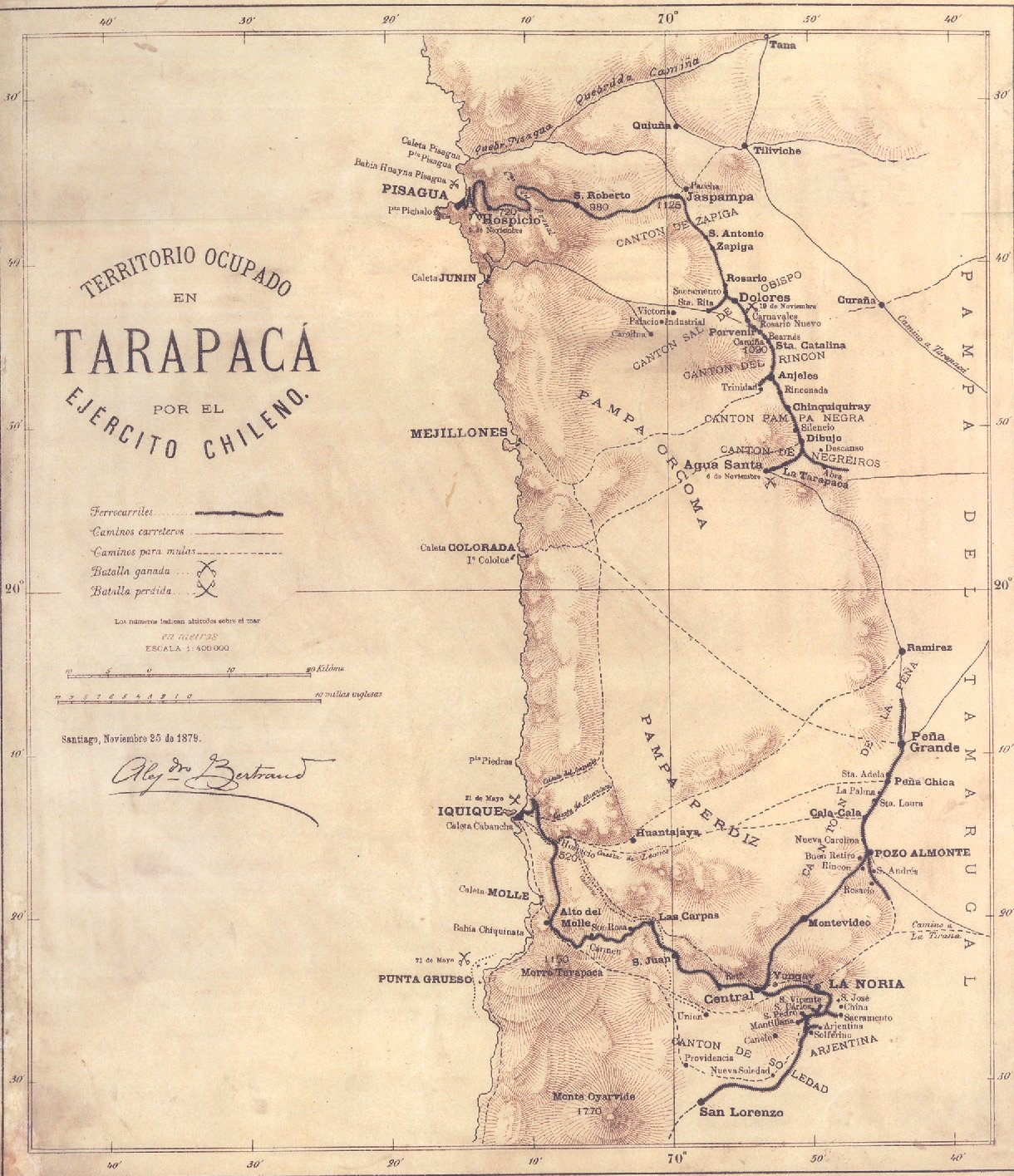
1879 map of Chile's land campaign.

The department had an area of about 69,000 km^{2}.

=== Boundaries ===
The department was limited to the north by the province of Arica (within the department of Tacna), by Bolivia to the east and south, and by the Pacific Ocean to the west. It was located in its entirety in the Atacama Desert, originally between the Lluta and Loa rivers. Most of the territory belonged to a plain and drainage basin known as the Pampa del Tamarugal.

=== Climate ===
The department was located in the Atacama Desert, a region with a cold desert climate and almost no precipitation.

== Politics ==
The department was administered by a departmental council (Spanish: consejo departamental). It was administered by the Catholic Church in Peru as part of the diocese of Arequipa until 1880, when it was replaced de facto by the Chilean Apostolic vicariate of Tarapacá.

=== List of governors ===
The list of mayors of the departmental council is as follows:

Mayor	Party	Term	
Mayor	Party	Begin	End
Antonio Gutiérrez de la Fuente	—N/a	January 3, 1876	March 14, 1878

=== Subdivisions ===
Tarapacá was divided into two provinces, each administered by a provincial council (Spanish: consejo provincial), further subdivided into districts.

Province	Districts
Tarapacá	Tarapacá
Tarapacá	Camiña
Tarapacá	Chiapa
Tarapacá	Mamiña
Tarapacá	Sibayo
Iquique	Iquique
Iquique	Pica
Iquique	Patillos
Iquique	Pisagua

== Demographics ==
Peruvian people constituted a minority in the region as both Chileans and Bolivians were more numerous. According to Peruvian historian Raúl Porras Barrenechea, its population included 17,013 Peruvians and 9,664 Chileans.

=== Notable people ===
- Floro Barreto (1919–1995), politician and militant of the Aprista Party.
- Ramón Castilla y Marquesado (1797–1867), three-time President of Peru (1845–1851; 1855–1862; 1863).
- Isidoro Gamarra Ramírez (1907–1999), syndicalist and member of the CGTP and the Communist Party.
- Remigio Morales Bermúdez (1836–1894), President of Peru from 1890 to 1894
- Germán Suárez Vertiz (1897–1975), painter
- Alfonso Ugarte y Vernal (1847–1880), businessman and soldier, killed in action during the battle of Arica.
- Ramón Zavala Suárez (1853–1880), saltpetre merchant and businessman

== Economy ==
The department was central to the Peruvian nitrate monopoly, established in 1875 by the Peruvian government to capitalize on the world market's high demand for nitrates. It was operated by the Peruvian Nitrate Company.

== Culture ==
From 1880 to 1883, the provinces of Iquique and Tarapacá were subject to a process of forced acculturation, which was concurrent with an anti-Chilean campaign carried out by its Peruvian colony.

=== Landmarks ===
A number of buildings built prior to the war have survived into the present, with some eventually having been designated as National Monuments of Chile.

Name	Location	Notes	Photo
Palacio Rímac	Iquique	Commissioned by José Balta to replace the building destroyed in 1868. Its construction began on January 6, 1871, and its inauguration was on July 28, 1876. It survived the events of 1877, and functioned as a temporary detention site in 1879, following the Battle of Iquique.	
Calle Huancavelica	Iquique	Originally known as Santa Rosa Street. Due to its protected status, many pre-war buildings have been kept in the area.	
Estación Iquique	Iquique	Train station built in 1871 as part of the province's railway.	
Iglesia de San Lorenzo	Tarapacá	The building is named after Saint Lawrence and dates back to 1720. In 1760, its nave was rebuilt following its predecessor's destruction in an earthquake. These construction works led to the church having two naves with a central wall that was intervened to be arched.	
Faro Serrano	Iquique	In 1875, the government of Peru commissioned the construction of a series of lighthouses along its coast to the French firm Barbier & Fenestre, through the French citizen resident in Lima, L. V. de Champeaux. One of those would be located in the island of Iquique. Its construction began in 1879, months prior to the war.	
Plaza de Armas	Iquique	The city's main square was the location of the new clock, for which it was also known as the Plaza del Reloj prior to 1879.	
Torre del Reloj	Iquique	Its construction was approved by the mayor Benigno Posada and the Government of the City Council on 14 December 1877, to replace the clock of the church, which had been destroyed by fire in 1873.	

== Transport ==
The department was serviced by a railway line established in 1872, which operated six steam locomotives and connected the port of Patillos, a port town 60 km to the south of Iquique, and today part of its commune. Danish engineer Holger Birkedal, who would later cooperate with Chile during the war, participated in the railway's construction.

== See also ==
- Treaty of Ancón
- War of the Pacific
- Tacna Province (Chile)
- Department of the Littoral (Peru)
