= Pablo Paredes =

Spanish footballer

Personal information
- Full name: Pablo Paredes Arratia
- Date of birth: 11 February 1983 (age 43)
- Place of birth: Laudio, Spain
- Height: 1.83 m (6 ft 0 in)
- Position: Midfielder

Youth career
- Kaskagorri Amurrio FT
- 1999–2001: Athletic Bilbao

Senior career*
Years	Team	Apps	(Gls)
2001–2003	Basconia	71	(11)
2003–2006	Bilbao Athletic	86	(6)
2006–2007	Barakaldo	16	(0)
2007–2009	Amurrio	67	(4)
2009–2010	Sestao	33	(2)
2010–2012	Laudio	70	(11)
2012–2015	Leioa	69	(8)
2016–2017	Amurrio		
- * Club domestic league appearances and goals

Pablo Paredes Arratia (born 11 February 1983) is a Spanish former footballer who played mainly as a central midfielder.

== Club career ==
Born in Laudio, Álava, Basque Country, Paredes joined Athletic Bilbao's youth setup in 1999, aged 16. He made his debut with the farm team in the 2001–02 campaign, in Tercera División.

In June 2003 Paredes was promoted to the reserves, in Segunda División B. He played his first match as a professional on 2 July 2005, starting in a 0–1 away loss against CFR Cluj, in that year's UEFA Intertoto Cup.

Paredes was released by the Lions in May 2006, and moved to Barakaldo CF in the third level. After appearing sparingly, he joined fourth-level Amurrio Club, appearing regularly during his two-year spell.

In the summer of 2009, Paredes signed for Sestao River Club in the third division. An undisputed starter, he appeared in 33 matches as his side were relegated.

Paredes moved to fourth-tier club CD Laudio on 12 June 2010. In August 2012 he joined fellow league team SD Leioa, achieving promotion back to the third level in 2013–14.
