= Lucía Pinto =

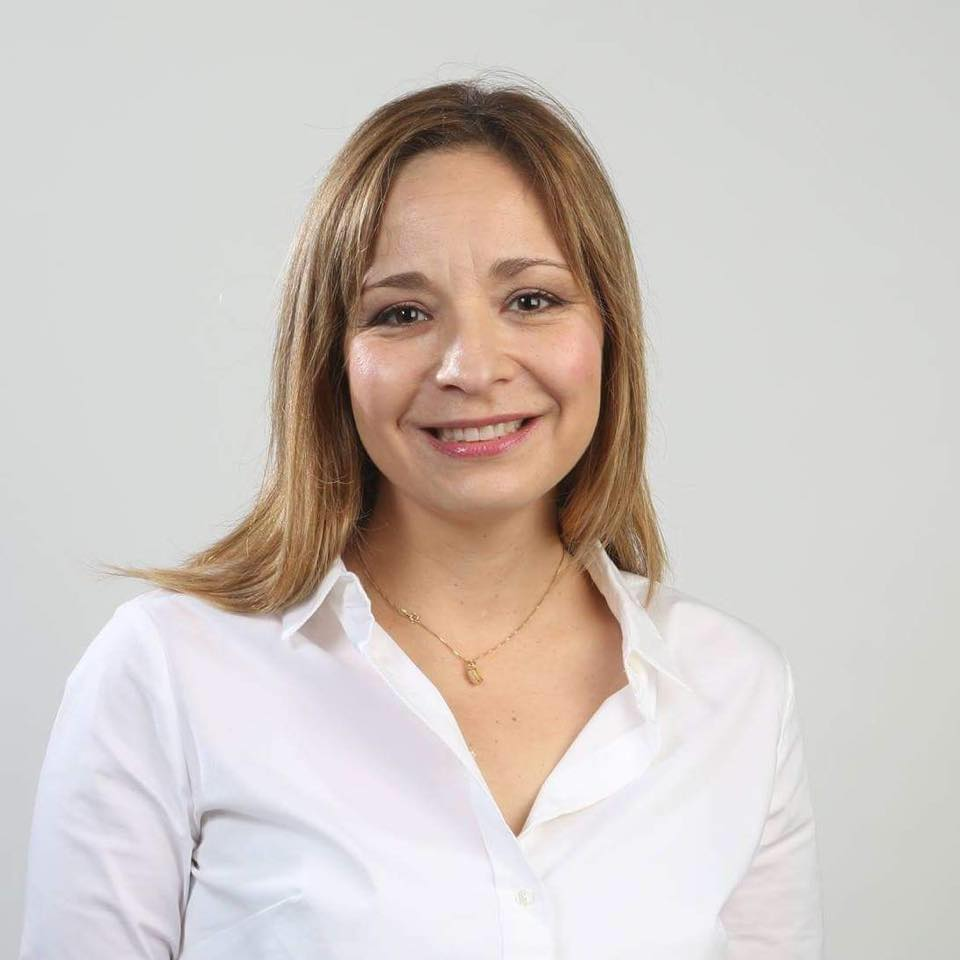
Lucía Pilar Pinto Ramírez

Lucía Pilar Pinto Ramírez (Vicuña, September 18, 1975) is a Chilean journalist and politician, member of the Independent Democratic Union (UDI). She was a councilor for the commune of La Serena until March 11, 2018, when President Sebastián Piñera appointed her as Intendant of the Coquimbo Region, a position she held until 2020.

== Family and studies ==
Lucía Pinto is the daughter of Floridor Pinto Cortés and Elena Ramírez Alvares. She began her education at the Kindergarten of the Rural School of La Campana in Vicuña, and later attended the D-95 School in the same commune for her primary studies. For her secondary studies, she went to the Colegio Sagrados Corazones in La Serena.

== Political career ==
She has been a member of the Independent Democratic Union since 2010. From 2010 to 2012, she served as the chief of staff of the Intendant of the Coquimbo Region, Sergio Gahona Salazar, during the first government of Sebastián Piñera. Later, she served as his chief of staff during his term as a deputy in the National Congress from 2014 to 2018.

In the 2016 municipal elections, she ran as a candidate for councilor in the commune of La Serena and was successfully elected. She served in this position until March 11, 2018, when she was called upon by the newly elected President Sebastián Piñera to assume the position of Intendant of the Coquimbo Region. However, on September 26, 2020, she announced her resignation from the position to focus on her defense against an investigation for an alleged tax fraud related to a land purchase. On July 23, 2021, the State Defense Council (CDE) filed a criminal complaint for this matter.

In August 2022, the Comptroller General's Office issued a report on the case, concluding that Pinto had "seriously infringed the principle of administrative probity". Because of this, the body decided to apply the disciplinary measure of dismissal against her.
