= Tarapacá Department (Chile) =

Department of Chile from 1883 to 1928

Iquique (1927–1974) Tarapacá (1884–1927)
- Department of Chile
- Flag

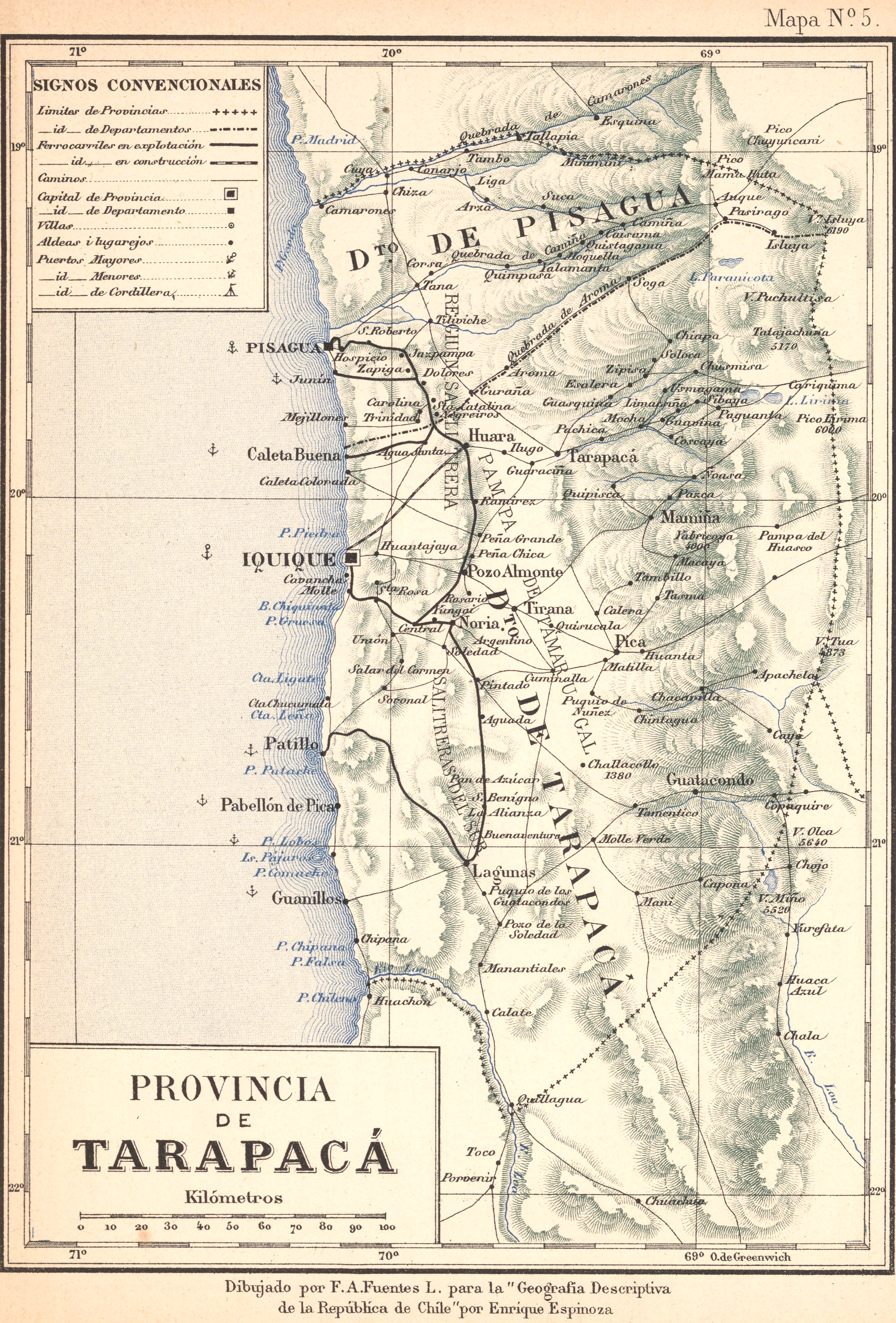
- Map of Tarapacá Province (1895)
- Capital: Iquique
- Demonym: Tarapaqueño, a
- Area
  - 1885: 40,000 km^{2} (15,000 sq mi)
- Population
  - 1885: 33,051
- Historical era: War of the Pacific
  - Treaty of Ancón: 20 October 1883
  - Established: 31 October 1884
  - Renamed: 30 December 1927
  - Reorganised: 1974
Preceded by	Succeeded by
Tarapacá Department	Iquique Province
- Today part of: Chile

Iquique, known as Tarapacá from 1884 to 1927, was a department of Tarapacá, a province of Chile. Located in the Atacama Desert, it existed between 1884 and 1976. Its capital was Iquique.

The Treaty of Ancón, which put an end to the war, was signed on October 20, 1883. The following year, the province of Tarapacá was formally created on October 31, incorporating the former Peruvian department of the same name. At the time, the provinces, subdivided into departments, were the first-level administrative divisions of Chile. The department, renamed on December 30, 1927, existed until the country's administrative reorganisation during the 1970s.

== History ==
The department was created on 31 October 1884 under the administration of the also new Tarapacá Province, both awarded to Chile under the Treaty of Ancón, along with Tacna. It was bordered to the north by the Pisagua Department, to the east by the Andes, to the south by the Antofagasta Department, and to the west by the Pacific Ocean.

== Administrative divisions ==
Municipality	Sub-delegations
Iquique; Iquique	Ferrocarril
Iquique; Iquique	Aduana
Iquique; Iquique	Santa María
Iquique; Iquique	Cavancha
Iquique; Iquique	Guantajaya
Iquique; Iquique	Pozo Almonte
Iquique; Iquique	Noria
Caleta Buena; Caleta Buena	Caleta Buena
Caleta Buena; Caleta Buena	Tarapacá
Pica; Pica	Salitreras del Sur
Pica; Pica	Guaneras
Pica; Pica	Pica
Pica; Pica	Guallacollo

== See also ==
- Tacna Province (Chile)
- Antofagasta Province
- Chilenization of Tacna, Arica and Tarapacá
- Litoral Department
