= Geoconda Navarrete =

Chilean lawyer

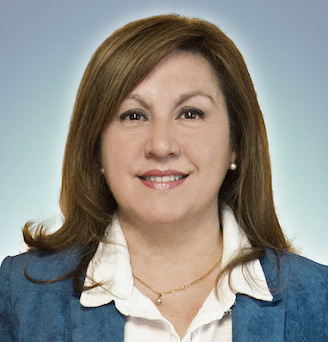

Member of the Constitutional Convention
- In office 4 July 2021 – 4 July 2022
- Constituency: 27th District

Personal details
- Born: 8 September 1969 (age 57) Victoria, Chile
- Party: Evópoli
- Spouse: Miguel Ángel Beltrán
- Children: Three
- Education: University of Concepción (BA); Pontifical Catholic University of Chile (PgD); Pontifical Catholic University of Valparaíso (PgD); University of Chile (PgD)
- Profession: Engineer

Geoconda Navarrete Arratia (born 8 September 1969) is a Chilean social worker and politician.

A member of the Evópoli party, she served as Intendant of the Aysén Region between 2018 and 2021 and was elected as a member of the Constitutional Convention in 2021, representing the 27th District of the Aysén Region.

== Early life and family ==
Navarrete was born on 8 September 1969 in Victoria, Chile. She is the daughter of Carlos Navarrete Espinoza and María Arratia Olivera.

She is married to Miguel Beltrán Venturelli and has three children.

== Professional career ==
Navarrete completed her secondary education at Liceo B-10. She studied social work at the University of Concepción and later completed postgraduate studies at the Pontifical Catholic University of Valparaíso.

Between 1995 and 2010, she worked at the Housing and Urbanization Service (SERVIU) of the Aysén Region, where she was responsible for leading the implementation of regional housing programs.

She served as president of the Regional Council of Aysén of the College of Social Workers of Chile and previously as Secretary General of the regional branch of the National Association of Fiscal Employees (ANEF).

== Political career ==
In March 2018, she was appointed Intendant of the Aysén Region, a position she held until January 2021.

In the elections held on 15–16 May 2021, Navarrete ran as a candidate for the Constitutional Convention representing the 27th District of the Aysén Region as part of the Vamos por Chile electoral pact. She obtained 3,404 votes, corresponding to 10.41% of the valid votes cast, and was elected as a member of the convention.
