= Baquedano Street =

Street in Iquique, Chile

Coordinates: 20.2139°S 70.1525°W

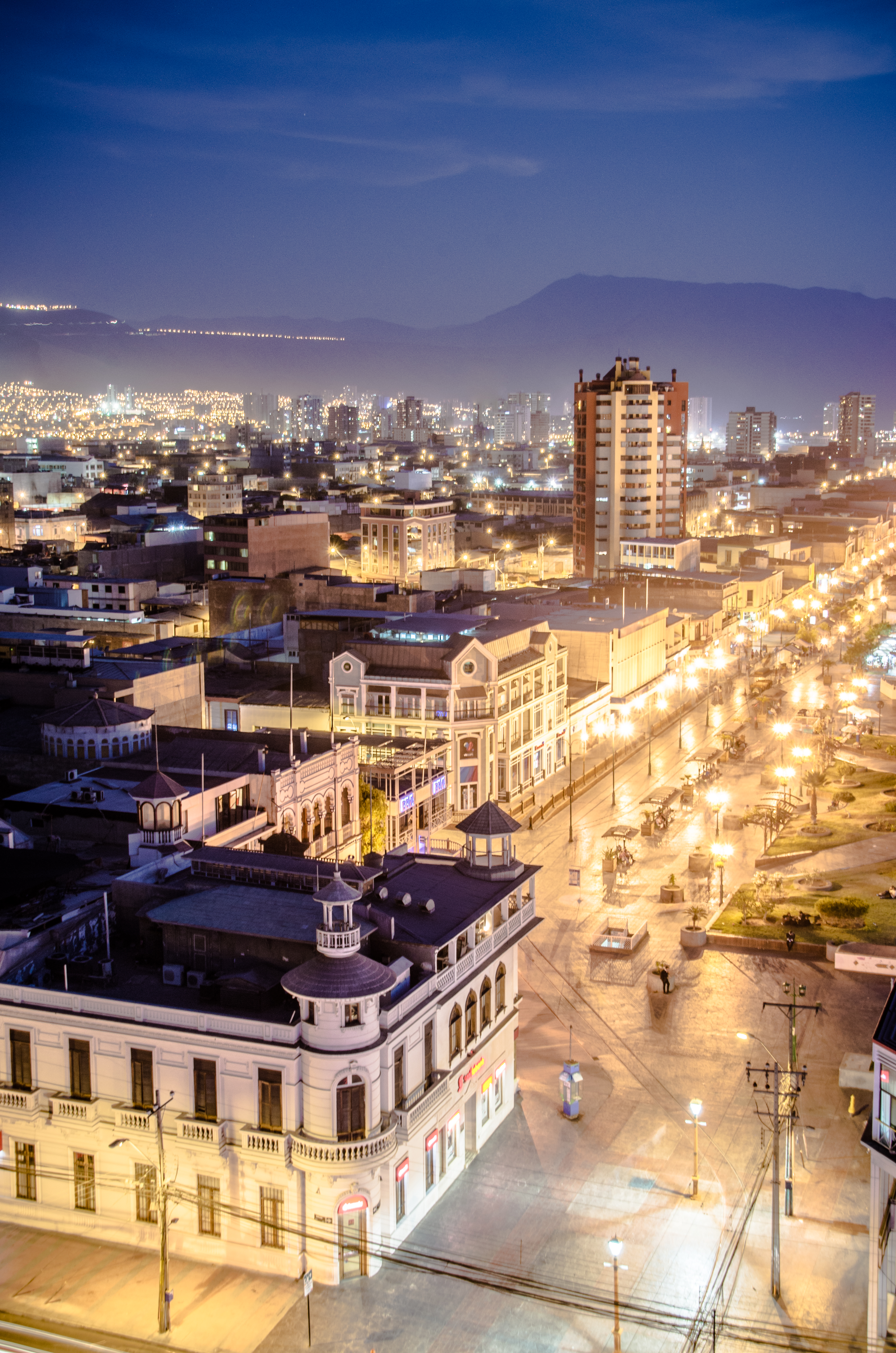
- Namesake: Manuel Baquedano; Huancavelica (former); Rose of Lima (former)
- From: Luis Uribe Street
- To: Arturo Prat Avenue

Baquedano Street (Spanish: Calle Baquedano; Paseo Baquedano), originally known as Santa Rosa Street (Spanish: Calle Santa Rosa) and then as Huancavelica Street (Spanish: Calle Huancavelica) prior to 1883, is a long avenue in the old quarter of Iquique, Chile. It is a popular tourist attraction and is a "typical zone" (Spanish: Zona típica), a status that preserves its historical and architectural heritage. It is characterized by its late 19th and early 20th-century houses built of wood from Europe.

== Architecture ==
The architecture that Baquedano Street exemplifies accommodates Iquique's prevailing climatic conditions. The buildings on Baquedano Street and, in general, all those that follow the city's traditional architecture, were built as stores or houses by immigrants who amassed fortunes through the nitrate works. The buildings can be characterized by three elements:

- The building material is Oregon pine imported from remote areas.
- The construction is a simple framework or "balloon frame."
- The architectural style is somewhat derivative of "American" (Georgian, Greek Revival, Adam).

The buildings typically show a continuous frontage (façade) and a verticality and lightness. They are typically organized around a central nucleus and feature vestibules, verandahs, skylights or lanterns, watchtowers, and a serial or "shady" roof over the terrace roof.

== Culture ==
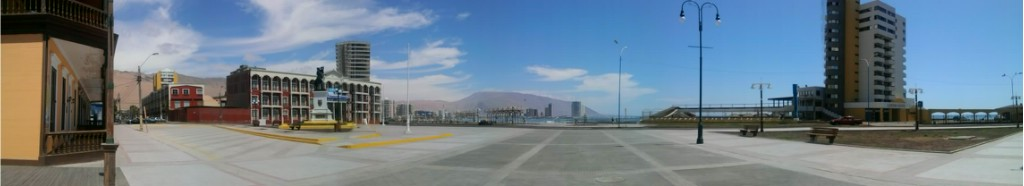
Sight of Baquedano Street from Arturo Prat Avenue

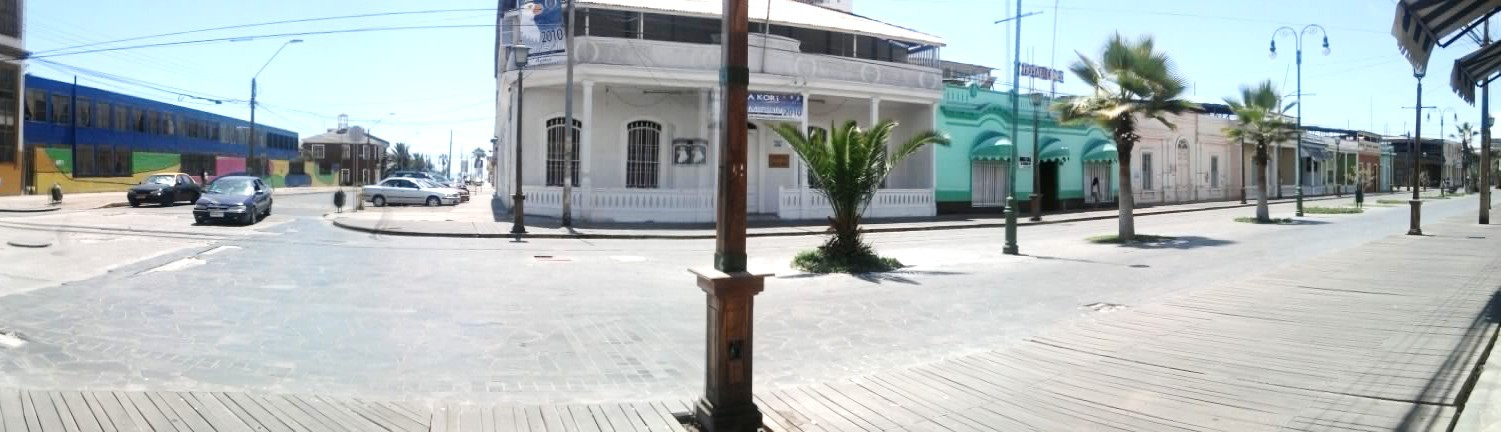

Baquedano Street was transformed by The Iquique council into an attractive pedestrian boulevard, with paths of wood and paving stone floor, by where an electrical street car journeys. Most public shows in the city take place there and it is also the gathering point for young people to play their music, put on plays and even dance. Also, craftsmen have settled there to display their goods and make crafts. Water fountains and plants ornament the almost fifteen blocks that make up the street, which begins and ends at the sea. Prat Square, at one end of the street, is delineated with flowers. This old public square is surrounded by architecturally significant structures— such as:

- A Clock Tower built in 1877 as a symbol of Iquique
- The Tarapaca's Employees Society building
- The Municipal Theater, built in 1890 and displaying an impressive collection of ancient indigenous artifacts
- The Astoreca Palace, which features luxurious period furniture The first three buildings are located in Prat Square, and the last one in Baquedano Street.

== Tourism ==
Baquedano Street has a number of hotels, guest houses, a lodge, pubs, coffee-shops, and restaurants.
