= Clock Tower (Iquique) =

Clock tower in Chile

Coordinates: 20°12′51″S 70°9′9″W

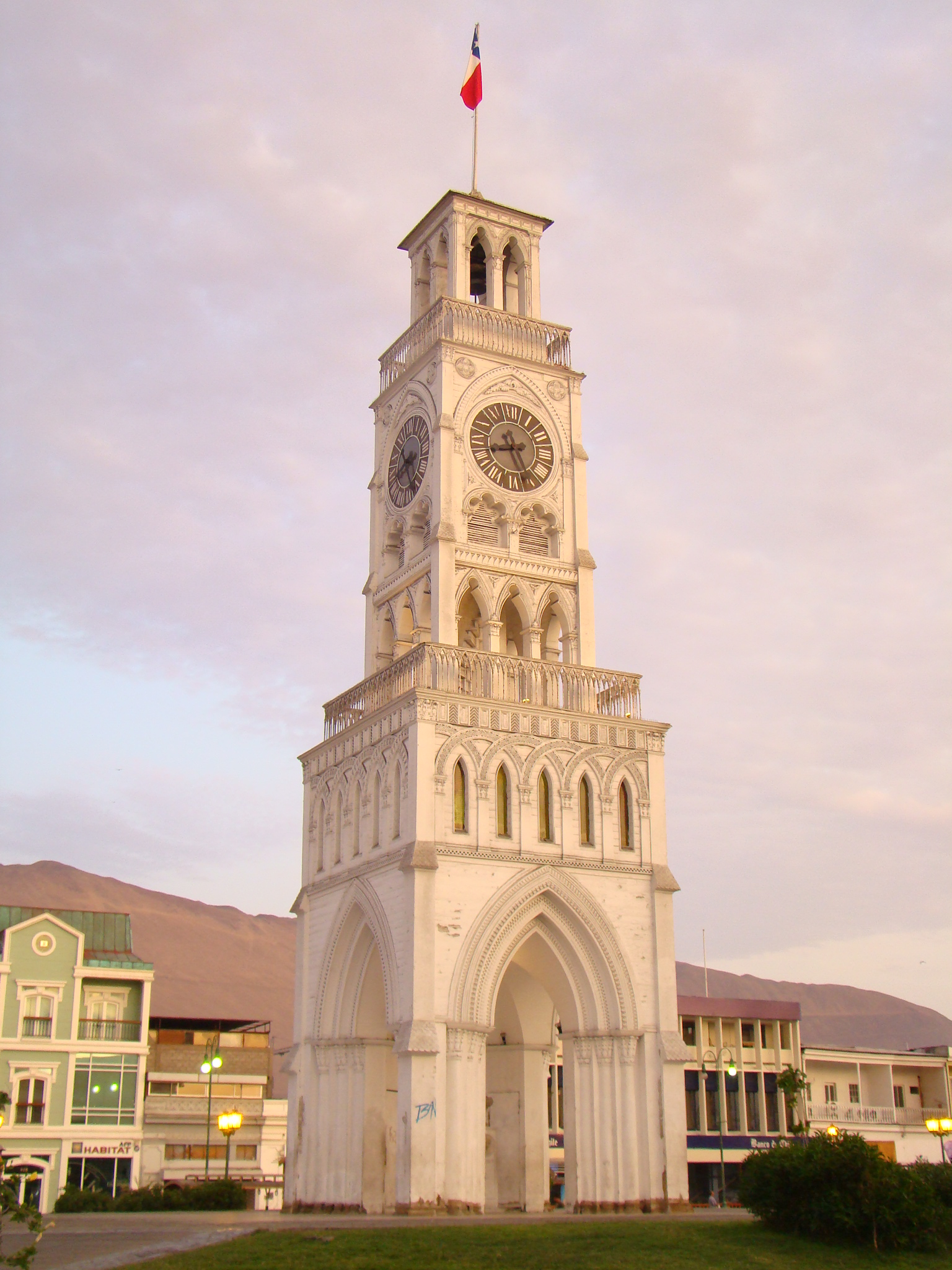
Clock Tower of Iquique.

The Clock Tower is a National Historic Landmark located in Plaza Arturo Prat in Iquique, Chile. It was built in 1878 (when Iquique was in Peruvian territory), with the mechanism imported from England.

According to Patricio Advis, the Clock Tower, together with the buildings surrounding it in the plaza (the Municipal Theater of Iquique, the building of the Workers Welfare Society of Tarapacá, the Casino Español and the Club Croata) is one of the most representative urban expressions of the "Saltpeter Period", a time which saw much foreign investment.

== History ==
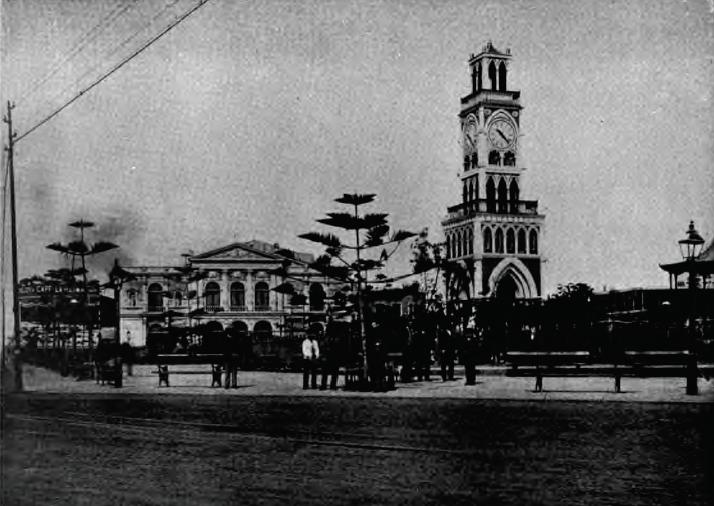
Plaza Arturo Prat in 1901.

Its construction was approved by the mayor Benigno Posada and the Government of the City Council on 14 December 1877, to replace the clock of the church, which had been destroyed by fire in 1873.

The committee appointed to plan the project estimated that it would take 7000 soles to purchase the clock, of which the sale was eventually agreed with the jeweler Federico Franzt. The four-faced clock, marking the quarter-hour with a smaller bell, and the hour with a larger, was shipped from England on December 10, 1878, on board the steamer Ibis.

The tower, the design of which is attributed to Manuel Eduardo Lapeyrouse, was built in 1878, so that the newly arrived machinery was shortly installed. It is estimated that it was running by January 1879, about three months before the start of the Pacific War.

In October 1880, the tower survived a fire that destroyed much of the center of Iquique. As a result, the square was expanded into the areas to the south and west destroyed by the fire, and renamed Plaza Arturo Prat. The tower would remain off-centre, until, in 1889, it was moved to its current position by a company of the Pisagua battalion, by the order of mayor Ramon Yabar.

It was declared a National Historic Landmark on July 13, 1987.

== Features ==
The tower's style is eclectic, combining Gothic elements with elements of Islamic architecture. The building also exhibits pointed, toothed, and lobed arches in the same composition, evoking a Mudéjar style.

It is built of Oregon pine, and consists of three staggered sections, each with a square plan. The base has in each of its four sides pointed arches which are open like a portico.
