= Carlos Urrutia =

Carlos Urrutia may refer to:

- Carlos Urrutia (Peruvian diplomat), Peru's ambassador to Venezuela
- Carlos Alfredo Urrutia Valenzuela (born 1949), Colombia's ambassador to the United States
