= October 6 =

October 6 this year in various calendars
- Tuesday, 6 October 2026
Akan	Kwabene
Armenian	18 Sahmi 1476
Aztec	Izcalli 4, 10 Ōlīn
Babylonian	23 Ululu, 2337 SE
Balinese pawukon	Menga, Beteng, Jaya, Umanis, Was, Anggara of Wayang, Kala, Jangur, Dewa
Bengali	21 Ashshin, BS 1433
Chinese	Yin Water Ox・Turtle Beak Mansion; Fire Horse Year, Month 8, Day 26 (Qiufen, 2 days until Hanlu)
Common Era	6 October 2026 CE
Coptic	26 Thout, AM 1743
Egyptian	23 Mechir, 2775 NE
Ethiopian	26 Maskaram, 2019 Amätä Məhrät
French Republican	Décade II, Quartidi de Vendémiaire de l'Année 235 de la République
Gregorian	6 October, AD 2026
Hebrew	25 Tishrei, AM 5787
Hindu	Āśleṣā・Siddha; Solar: 20 Āśvina, 1948 SE; Lunisolar: Ekādaśī, Kṛishna pakṣa of Bhādrapada, 2083 VE; Rāudra・5127 KY・1,872,854
Icelandic	Þriðjudagur, 13 Haustmánuður 2026
Islamic	23 Rabi' al-thani, AH 1448 (using tabular method)
ISO week date	2026-W41-2
Japanese	26 Hazuki, Reiwa 8 (Shūbun, 2 days until Kanro)
Julian	23 September, AD 2026 (AM 7534)
Julian day	2461320
Korean	26 Dakdal, 4359 DE
Maya	13.0.13.17.17; 10 Yax, 10 Caban
Roman	ante diem IX Kalendas Octobres, MMDCCLXXIX AUC
Solar Hijri	14 Mehr, SH 1405
Tibetan	26 khrums, me pho rta 2153 or 1772 or 1000

<<	October					>>
Su	Mo	Tu	We	Th	Fr	Sa
				1	2	3
4	5	6	7	8	9	10
11	12	13	14	15	16	17
18	19	20	21	22	23	24
25	26	27	28	29	30	31
2026

October 6 in recent years
2026 (Tuesday)
2025 (Monday)
2024 (Sunday)
2023 (Friday)
2022 (Thursday)
2021 (Wednesday)
2020 (Tuesday)
2019 (Sunday)
2018 (Saturday)
2017 (Friday)

October 6 is the 279th day of the year (280th in leap years) in the Gregorian calendar; 86 days remain until the end of the year.

== Events ==
=== Pre-1600 ===
- 105 BC – Cimbrian War: Defeat at the Battle of Arausio of the Roman army of the mid-Republic.
- 69 BC – Third Mithridatic War: The military of the Roman Republic subdues Armenia.
- AD 23 – Rebels decapitate Wang Mang, only Emperor of the Xin Dynasty, after his capital was sacked during a peasant rebellion.
- 404 – Byzantine Empress Eudoxia dies from the miscarriage of her seventh pregnancy.
- 618 – Transition from Sui to Tang: Wang Shichong decisively defeats Li Mi at the Battle of Yanshi.
- 891 – Election of Pope Formosus following the death of pope Stephen V in the previous month.
- 1539 – Spain's DeSoto expedition takes over the Apalachee capital of Anhaica for their winter quarters.
- 1600 – Euridice, the earliest surviving opera, receives its première performance, beginning the Baroque period.

=== 1601–1900 ===
- 1620 – The Polish–Lithuanian Commonwealth suffers a defeat against the Ottoman Empire in the battle of Cecora after a heroic defense over several days and the death of their commander Hetman Stanisław Żółkiewski.
- 1683 – Immigrant families found Germantown, Pennsylvania in the first major immigration of German people to America.
- 1762 – Seven Years' War: The British capture Manila from Spain and occupy it.
- 1777 – American Revolutionary War: British forces capture Forts Clinton and Montgomery on the Hudson River.
- 1789 – French Revolution: King Louis XVI is forced to change his residence from Versailles to the Tuileries Palace.
- 1810 – A large fire destroys a third of all the buildings in the town of Raahe in the Grand Duchy of Finland.
- 1849 – The execution of the 13 Martyrs of Arad after the Hungarian war of independence.
- 1854 – In England the great fire of Newcastle and Gateshead leads to 53 deaths and hundreds injured.
- 1884 – The Naval War College of the United States is founded in Rhode Island.
- 1898 – Phi Mu Alpha Sinfonia, the largest American music fraternity, is founded at the New England Conservatory of Music.

=== 1901–present ===
- 1903 – The High Court of Australia sits for the first time.
- 1908 – The Bosnian crisis erupts when Austria-Hungary formally annexes Bosnia and Herzegovina.
- 1910 – Eleftherios Venizelos is elected Prime Minister of Greece for the first of seven times.
- 1915 – World War I: Combined Austro-Hungarian and German Central Powers, reinforced by the recently joined Bulgaria, launch a new offensive against Serbia under command of August von Mackensen.
- 1915 – World War I: Entente forces land in Thessaloniki, to open the Macedonian front against the Central Powers.
- 1920 – Ukrainian War of Independence: The Starobilsk agreement is signed by representatives of the Ukrainian Soviet Socialist Republic and the Makhnovshchina.
- 1923 – The Turkish National Movement enters Constantinople.
- 1927 – Opening of The Jazz Singer, the first prominent "talkie" movie.
- 1934 – Revolution of 1934: The President of the autonomous government of Catalonia, Lluís Companys, proclaims the Catalan State with the support of the Worker's Alliance.
- 1939 – World War II: The Battle of Kock is the final combat of the September Campaign in Poland.
- 1942 – World War II: American troops force the Japanese from their positions east of the Matanikau River during the Battle of Guadalcanal.
- 1943 – World War II: Thirteen civilians are burnt alive by a paramilitary group in Crete during the Nazi occupation of Greece.
- 1944 – World War II: Units of the 1st Czechoslovak Army Corps enter Czechoslovakia during the Battle of the Dukla Pass.
- 1973 – Egypt and Syria launch coordinated attacks against Israel, beginning the Yom Kippur War.
- 1976 – Cubana de Aviación Flight 455 is destroyed by two bombs, placed on board by an anti-Castro militant group.
- 1976 – Premier Hua Guofeng arrests the Gang of Four, ending the Cultural Revolution in China.
- 1976 – Dozens are killed by Thai police and right-wing paramilitaries in the Thammasat University massacre; afterwards, the Seni Pramoj government is toppled in a military coup led by Sangad Chaloryu.
- 1977 – The first prototype of the Mikoyan MiG-29, designated 9-01, makes its maiden flight.
- 1979 – Pope John Paul II becomes the first pontiff to visit the White House.
- 1981 – Egyptian President Anwar Sadat is murdered by Islamic extremists.
- 1981 – NLM CityHopper Flight 431 crashes in Moerdijk after taking off from Rotterdam The Hague Airport in the Netherlands, killing all 17 people on board.
- 1985 – Police constable Keith Blakelock is murdered as riots erupt in the Broadwater Farm suburb of London.
- 1987 – Fiji becomes a republic.
- 1990 – Space Shuttle Discovery is launched on STS-41, and deploys the Ulysses space probe to study the Sun's polar regions.
- 1995 – The first planet orbiting another sun, 51 Pegasi b, is discovered.
- 2007 – Jason Lewis completes the first human-powered circumnavigation of the Earth.
- 2010 – Instagram, a mainstream photo-sharing application, is founded.
- 2018 – The United States Senate confirms Brett Kavanaugh as a Supreme Court Associate Justice, ending a contentious confirmation process.
- 2022 – Annie Ernaux is awarded the Nobel Prize in Literature.
- 2025 – The 2025 Alberta teachers' strike begins, leaving approximately 51,000 teachers off-work, impacting about 730,000 Albertan students.

== Births ==
=== Pre-1600 ===
- 649 – Yuknoom Yichʼaak Kʼahkʼ (died around 696)
- 1289 – Wenceslaus III of Bohemia (died 1306)
- 1459 – Martin Behaim, German navigator and geographer (died 1507)
- 1510 – John Caius, English physician and academic, co-founded the Gonville and Caius College (died 1573)
- 1510 – Rowland Taylor, English priest and martyr (died 1555)
- 1552 – Matteo Ricci, Italian priest and missionary (died 1610)
- 1555 – Ferenc Nádasdy, Hungarian noble (died 1604)
- 1565 – Marie de Gournay, French writer (died 1645)
- 1573 – Henry Wriothesley, 3rd Earl of Southampton, English politician, Lord Lieutenant of Hampshire (died 1624)
- 1576 – Roger Manners, 5th Earl of Rutland (died 1612)
- 1591 – Settimia Caccini, Italian singer-songwriter (died 1638)

=== 1601–1900 ===
- 1610 – Charles de Sainte-Maure, duc de Montausier, French general (died 1690)
- 1626 – Géraud de Cordemoy, French historian, philosopher and lawyer (died 1684)
- 1716 – George Montagu-Dunk, 2nd Earl of Halifax, English general and politician, Lord Lieutenant of Ireland (died 1771)
- 1729 – Sarah Crosby, English preacher, the first female Methodist preacher (died 1804)
- 1732 – John Broadwood, Scottish businessman, co-founded John Broadwood and Sons (died 1812)
- 1738 – Archduchess Maria Anna of Austria (died 1789)
- 1742 – Johan Herman Wessel, Norwegian-Danish poet and playwright (died 1785)
- 1744 – James McGill, Scottish-Canadian businessman and philanthropist, founded McGill University (died 1813)
- 1767 – Henri Christophe, Grenadian-Haitian king (died 1820)
- 1769 – Isaac Brock, English general and politician, Lieutenant Governor of Upper Canada (died 1812)
- 1773 – John MacCulloch, Scottish geologist and academic (died 1835)
- 1773 – Louis Philippe I of France (died 1850)
- 1801 – Hippolyte Carnot, French politician (died 1888)
- 1803 – Heinrich Wilhelm Dove, Polish-German physicist and meteorologist (died 1879)
- 1820 – James Caulfeild, 3rd Earl of Charlemont, Irish politician, Lord Lieutenant of Armagh (died 1892)
- 1820 – Jenny Lind, Swedish soprano and actress (died 1887)
- 1831 – Richard Dedekind, German mathematician and philosopher (died 1916)
- 1838 – Giuseppe Cesare Abba, Italian soldier, poet, and author (died 1910)
- 1846 – George Westinghouse, American engineer and businessman, founded the Westinghouse Air Brake Company (died 1914)
- 1862 – Albert J. Beveridge, American historian and politician (died 1927)
- 1866 – Reginald Fessenden, Canadian engineer and academic, invented radiotelephony (died 1932)
- 1874 – Frank G. Allen, American merchant and politician, 51st Governor of Massachusetts (died 1950)
- 1876 – Ernest Lapointe, Canadian lawyer and politician, 18th Canadian Minister of Justice (died 1941)
- 1882 – Karol Szymanowski, Polish pianist and composer (died 1937)
- 1886 – Edwin Fischer, Swiss pianist and conductor (died 1960)
- 1887 – Le Corbusier, Swiss-French architect and painter, designed the Philips Pavilion and Saint-Pierre, Firminy (died 1965)
- 1888 – Roland Garros, French soldier and pilot (died 1918)
- 1891 – Hendrik Adamson, Estonian poet and educator (died 1946)
- 1893 – Meghnad Saha, Indian astrophysicist, astronomer, and academic (died 1956)
- 1895 – Caroline Gordon, American author and critic (died 1981)
- 1896 – David Howard, American film director (died 1941)
- 1897 – Florence B. Seibert, American biochemist and academic (died 1991)
- 1900 – Vivion Brewer, American activist and desegregationist (died 1991)
- 1900 – Willy Merkl, German mountaineer (died 1934)
- 1900 – Stan Nichols, English cricketer (died 1961)

=== 1901–present ===
- 1901 – Eveline Du Bois-Reymond Marcus, German-Brazilian zoologist and academic (died 1990)
- 1903 – Ernest Walton, Irish physicist and academic, Nobel Prize laureate (died 1995)
- 1905 – Helen Wills, American tennis player and painter (died 1998)
- 1906 – Janet Gaynor, American actress (died 1984)
- 1906 – Taffy O'Callaghan, Welsh footballer and coach (died 1946)
- 1908 – Carole Lombard, American actress (died 1942)
- 1908 – Sergei Sobolev, Russian mathematician and academic (died 1989)
- 1910 – Barbara Castle, English journalist and politician, First Secretary of State (died 2002)
- 1910 – Orazio Satta Puliga, Italian automobile designer (died 1974)
- 1912 – Perkins Bass, American lawyer and politician (died 2011)
- 1913 – Méret Oppenheim, German-Swiss painter and photographer (died 1985)
- 1914 – Thor Heyerdahl, Norwegian ethnographer and explorer (died 2002)
- 1914 – Joan Littlewood, English director and playwright (died 2002)
- 1915 – Carolyn Goodman, American psychologist and activist (died 2007)
- 1915 – Humberto Sousa Medeiros, Portuguese-American cardinal (died 1983)
- 1915 – Alice Timander, Swedish dentist and actress (died 2007)
- 1916 – Chiang Wei-kuo, Japanese-Chinese general (died 1997)
- 1916 – Otto Djaya, Indonesian painter (died 2002)
- 1917 – Fannie Lou Hamer, American activist and philanthropist (died 1977)
- 1918 – Goh Keng Swee, Singaporean soldier and politician, 2nd Deputy Prime Minister of Singapore (died 2010)
- 1918 – André Pilette, French-Belgian race car driver (died 1993)
- 1919 – Tommy Lawton, English footballer and coach (died 1996)
- 1920 – John Donaldson, Baron Donaldson of Lymington, English lawyer and judge (died 2005)
- 1921 – Evgenii Landis, Ukrainian-Russian mathematician and theorist (died 1997)
- 1921 – Joseph Lowery, American minister and activist (died 2020)
- 1921 – Giovanni Michelotti, Italian automotive designer (died 1980)
- 1922 – Joe Frazier, American baseball player and manager (died 2011)
- 1922 – Teala Loring, American actress (died 2007)
- 1923 – Robert Kuok, Malaysian Chinese business magnate and investor
- 1923 – Yaşar Kemal, Turkish journalist and author (died 2015)
- 1925 – Shana Alexander, American journalist and author (died 2005)
- 1927 – Bill King, American sportscaster (died 2005)
- 1928 – Flora MacNeil, Scottish Gaelic singer (died 2015)
- 1928 – Barbara Werle, American actress and singer (died 2013)
- 1929 – George Mattos, American pole vaulter (died 2012)
- 1930 – Hafez al-Assad, Syrian general and politician, 20th President of Syria (died 2000)
- 1930 – Richie Benaud, Australian cricketer and sportscaster (died 2015)
- 1931 – Nikolai Chernykh, Russian astronomer (died 2004)
- 1931 – Eileen Derbyshire, English actress
- 1931 – Riccardo Giacconi, Italian-American astrophysicist and astronomer, Nobel Prize laureate (died 2018)
- 1933 – Prince Mukarram Jah, 8th Nizam of Hyderabad (died 2023)
- 1934 – Marshall Rosenberg, American psychologist and author (died 2015)
- 1935 – Bruno Sammartino, Italian-American wrestler and trainer (died 2018)
- 1936 – Julius L. Chambers, American lawyer, educator, and activist (died 2013)
- 1938 – Serge Nubret, Caribbean-French bodybuilder and actor (died 2011)
- 1939 – Melvyn Bragg, English journalist, author, and academic
- 1939 – Jack Cullen, American baseball player
- 1939 – Richard Delgado, American lawyer and academic
- 1939 – Sheila Greibach, American computer scientist and academic
- 1939 – John J. LaFalce, American captain, lawyer, and politician
- 1940 – Jan Keizer, Dutch footballer and referee
- 1941 – Paul Popham, American soldier and activist, co-founded Gay Men's Health Crisis (died 1987)
- 1942 – Dan Christensen, American painter (died 2007)
- 1942 – Britt Ekland, Swedish actress and singer
- 1942 – Fred Travalena, American comedian and actor (died 2009)
- 1943 – Richard Caborn, English engineer and politician, Minister for Sport and the Olympics
- 1943 – Peter Dowding, Australian politician, 24th Premier of Western Australia
- 1943 – Alexander Maxovich Shilov, Russian painter
- 1943 – Cees Veerman, Dutch singer-songwriter and guitarist (died 2014)
- 1944 – Merzak Allouache, Algerian director and screenwriter
- 1944 – Patrick Cordingley, English general
- 1944 – Boris Mikhailov, Russian ice hockey player and coach
- 1944 – Carlos Pace, Brazilian race car driver (died 1977)
- 1945 – Ivan Graziani, Italian singer-songwriter and guitarist (died 1997)
- 1946 – Lloyd Doggett, American lawyer and politician
- 1946 – Tony Greig, South African-English cricketer and sportscaster (died 2012)
- 1946 – John Monie, Australian rugby league player and coach
- 1946 – Eddie Villanueva, Filipino evangelist and politician, founded the ZOE Broadcasting Network
- 1946 – Vinod Khanna, Indian actor, producer and politician (died 2017)
- 1947 – Patxi Andión, Spanish singer-songwriter and actor (died 2019)
- 1947 – Klaus Dibiasi, Italian diver
- 1947 – Millie Small, Jamaican singer-songwriter (died 2020)
- 1948 – Gerry Adams, Irish republican politician
- 1948 – Glenn Branca, American guitarist and composer (died 2018)
- 1949 – Lonnie Johnson, American inventor
- 1949 – Penny Junor, English journalist and author
- 1949 – Thomas McClary, American R&B singer-songwriter and guitarist
- 1949 – Leslie Moonves, American businessman
- 1949 – Nicolas Peyrac, French singer-songwriter and photographer
- 1950 – David Brin, American physicist and author
- 1951 – Kevin Cronin, American singer-songwriter, guitarist, and producer
- 1951 – Clive Rees, Singaporean-Welsh rugby player and educator
- 1951 – Gavin Sutherland, Scottish singer-songwriter and bass player
- 1951 – Manfred Winkelhock, German race car driver (died 1985)
- 1952 – Ayten Mutlu, Turkish poet and author
- 1953 – Rein Rannap, Estonian pianist and composer
- 1954 – Bill Buford, American author and journalist
- 1954 – David Hidalgo, American singer-songwriter and guitarist
- 1955 – Tony Dungy, American football player and coach
- 1956 – Sadiq al-Ahmar, Yemeni politician (died 2023)
- 1956 – Kathleen Webb, American author and illustrator
- 1957 – Bruce Grobbelaar, Zimbabwean footballer and coach
- 1958 – Sergei Mylnikov, Russian ice hockey player and coach (died 2017)
- 1959 – Turki bin Sultan, Saudi Arabian politician (died 2012)
- 1959 – Oil Can Boyd, American baseball player
- 1959 – Brian Higgins, American politician
- 1959 – Walter Ray Williams, Jr., American bowler
- 1960 – Richard Jobson, Scottish singer, songwriter director and producer.
- 1961 – Miyuki Matsuda, Japanese actress
- 1961 – Paul Sansome, English footballer
- 1961 – Ben Summerskill, English businessman and journalist
- 1962 – David Baker, American biologist and academic
- 1962 – Rich Yett, American baseball player
- 1963 – Sven Andersson, Swedish footballer and coach
- 1963 – Elisabeth Shue, American actress
- 1964 – Ricky Berry, American basketball player (died 1989)
- 1964 – Mark Field, German-English lawyer and politician
- 1964 – Tom Jager, American swimmer and coach
- 1964 – Miltos Manetas, Greek painter
- 1964 – Knut Storberget, Norwegian lawyer and politician, Norwegian Minister of Justice
- 1964 – Matthew Sweet, American singer-songwriter, guitarist, and producer
- 1965 – Jürgen Kohler, German footballer and manager
- 1965 – Peg O'Connor, American philosopher and academic
- 1965 – Steve Scalise, American lawyer and politician
- 1965 – Rubén Sierra, Puerto Rican-American baseball player
- 1965 – John McWhorter, American academic and linguist
- 1966 – Melania Mazzucco, Italian author
- 1966 – Jacqueline Obradors, American actress
- 1966 – Niall Quinn, Irish footballer and manager
- 1966 – Tommy Stinson, American singer-songwriter and bass player
- 1967 – Kennet Andersson, Swedish footballer
- 1967 – Svend Karlsen, Norwegian strongman and bodybuilder
- 1967 – Steven Woolfe, English barrister and politician
- 1968 – Bjarne Goldbæk, Danish footballer and sportscaster
- 1968 – Bob May, American golfer
- 1969 – Byron Black, Zimbabwean golfer
- 1969 – Muhammad V of Kelantan, Yang di-Pertuan Agong of Malaysia
- 1970 – Amy Jo Johnson, American actress
- 1970 – Shauna MacDonald, Canadian actress and producer
- 1970 – Darren Oliver, American baseball player
- 1971 – Emily Mortimer, English actress
- 1972 – Mark Schwarzer, Australian footballer
- 1973 – Jeff B. Davis, American comedian, actor, and singer
- 1973 – Ioan Gruffudd, Welsh actor
- 1973 – Rebecca Lobo, American basketball player and sportscaster
- 1974 – Walter Centeno, Costa Rican footballer and manager
- 1974 – Kenny Jönsson, Swedish ice hockey player and coach
- 1974 – Seema Kennedy, British politician
- 1974 – Jeremy Sisto, American actor, producer, and screenwriter
- 1974 – Hoàng Xuân Vinh, Vietnamese shooter
- 1975 – Reon King, Guyanese cricketer
- 1976 – Freddy García, Venezuelan baseball player
- 1976 – Brett Gelman, American actor and comedian
- 1977 – Daniel Brière, Canadian ice hockey player
- 1977 – Shimon Gershon, Israeli footballer and singer
- 1977 – Wes Ramsey, American actor
- 1978 – Ricky Hatton, English boxer and promoter (died 2025)
- 1978 – Liu Yang, Chinese astronaut
- 1979 – David Di Tommaso, French footballer (died 2005)
- 1979 – Mohamed Kallon, Sierra Leonean footballer and manager
- 1979 – Richard Seymour, American football player
- 1980 – Abdoulaye Méïté, French footballer
- 1981 – Zurab Khizanishvili, Georgian footballer
- 1982 – Levon Aronian, Armenian chess grandmaster
- 1982 – Will Butler, American musician and composer
- 1982 – Paul Smith, English boxer
- 1983 – Renata Voráčová, Czech tennis player
- 1984 – Morné Morkel, South African cricketer
- 1985 – Mitchell Cole, English footballer (died 2012)
- 1985 – Sylvia Fowles, American basketball player
- 1985 – Sandra Góngora, Mexican ten-pin bowler
- 1985 – Tarmo Kink, Estonian footballer
- 1986 – Meg Myers, American singer-songwriter and guitarist
- 1986 – Olivia Thirlby, American actress
- 1987 – Akuila Uate, Fijian-Australian rugby league player
- 1989 – Albert Ebossé Bodjongo, Cameroonian footballer (died 2014)
- 1989 – Tyler Ennis, Canadian ice hockey player
- 1989 – Pizzi, Portuguese footballer
- 1990 – Scarlett Byrne, English actress
- 1990 – Marcus Johansson, Swedish ice hockey player
- 1990 – Nazem Kadri, Canadian ice hockey player
- 1990 – Han Sun-hwa, South Korean singer and actress
- 1992 – Josh Archibald, Canadian-American ice hockey player
- 1992 – Taylor Paris, Canadian rugby player
- 1993 – Adam Gemili, English sprinter
- 1993 – Jourdan Miller, American fashion model
- 1993 – Nail Yakupov, Russian ice hockey player
- 1994 – Jake Guentzel, American ice hockey player
- 1994 – Lee Joo-heon, South Korean rapper and songwriter
- 1996 – Kevin Diks, Indonesian footballer
- 1997 – Kasper Dolberg, Danish footballer
- 1999 – Trevor Lawrence, American football player
- 2000 – Jazz Jennings, American internet personality
- 2000 – Kyle Pitts, American football player
- 2000 – Addison Rae, American social media personality, dancer, and singer
- 2001 – Hitomi Honda, Japanese singer based in South Korea
- 2002 – Jonathan Kuminga, Congolese basketball player
- 2004 – Bronny James, American basketball player
- 2004 – Hanni, Australian singer

== Deaths ==
=== Pre-1600 ===
- AD 23 – Wang Mang, emperor of the Xin Dynasty
- 404 – Aelia Eudoxia, Byzantine empress
- 836 – Nicetas the Patrician, Byzantine general
- 869 – Ermentrude of Orléans, Frankish queen (born 823)
- 877 – Charles the Bald, Holy Roman Emperor (born 823)
- 997 – Minamoto no Mitsunaka, Japanese samurai (born 912)
- 1014 – Samuel, tsar of the Bulgarian Empire
- 1019 – Frederick of Luxembourg, count of Moselgau (born 965)
- 1145 – Baldwin, archbishop of Pisa
- 1090 – Adalbero, bishop of Würzburg
- 1101 – Bruno of Cologne, German monk, founded the Carthusian Order
- 1173 – Engelbert III, margrave of Istria
- 1349 – Joan II of Navarre, daughter of Louis X of France (born 1312)
- 1398 – Chŏng Tojŏn, Korean prime minister (born 1342)
- 1413 – Dawit I, ruler (Emperor) of Ethiopia (born 1382)
- 1536 – William Tyndale, English Protestant Bible translator (born c. 1494)
- 1553 – Şehzade Mustafa, Ottoman prince (born 1515)
- 1559 – William I, Count of Nassau-Siegen, German count (born 1487)

=== 1601–1900 ===
- 1640 – Wolrad IV, Count of Waldeck-Eisenberg (born 1588)
- 1641 – Matthijs Quast, Dutch explorer
- 1644 – Elisabeth of France, queen of Spain and Portugal (born 1602)
- 1660 – Paul Scarron, French poet and author (born 1610)
- 1661 – Guru Har Rai, Indian 7th Sikh guru (born 1630)
- 1688 – Christopher Monck, 2nd Duke of Albemarle, English soldier and politician, Lieutenant Governor of Jamaica (born 1652)
- 1762 – Francesco Manfredini, Italian violinist and composer (born 1684)
- 1819 – Charles Emmanuel IV, king of Sardinia (born 1751)
- 1829 – Pierre Derbigny, French-American politician, 6th Governor of Louisiana (born 1769)
- 1836 – Johannes Jelgerhuis, Dutch painter and actor (born 1770)
- 1873 – Paweł Strzelecki, Polish-English geologist and explorer (born 1797)
- 1883 – Dục Đức, Vietnamese emperor (born 1852)
- 1891 – Charles Stewart Parnell, Irish politician (born 1846)
- 1892 – Alfred, Lord Tennyson, English poet (born 1809)

=== 1901–present ===
- 1912 – Auguste Beernaert, Belgian politician, 14th Prime Minister of Belgium, Nobel Prize laureate (born 1829)
- 1923 – Damat Ferid Pasha, Ottoman politician, 285th Grand Vizier of the Ottoman Empire (born 1853)
- 1942 – Siegmund Glücksmann, German politician (born 1884)
- 1945 – Leonardo Conti, German SS officer (born 1900)
- 1947 – Leevi Madetoja, Finnish composer and critic (born 1887)
- 1951 – Will Keith Kellogg, American businessman, founded the Kellogg Company (born 1860)
- 1951 – Otto Fritz Meyerhof, German-American physician and biochemist, Nobel Prize laureate (born 1884)
- 1959 – Bernard Berenson, American historian and author (born 1865)
- 1962 – Tod Browning, American actor, director, screenwriter (born 1880)
- 1968 – Phyllis Nicolson, English mathematician and physicist (born 1917)
- 1969 – Walter Hagen, American golfer (born 1892)
- 1969 – Otto Steinböck, Austrian zoologist (born 1893)
- 1972 – Cléo de Verberena, Brazilian actress and film director (born c. 1909)
- 1973 – Sidney Blackmer, American actor (born 1895)
- 1973 – François Cevert, French race car driver (born 1944)
- 1973 – Dick Laan, Dutch actor, screenwriter, and author (born 1894)
- 1973 – Dennis Price, English actor (born 1915)
- 1973 – Margaret Wilson, American missionary and author (born 1882)
- 1974 – Helmut Koinigg, Austrian race car driver (born 1948)
- 1976 – Gilbert Ryle, English philosopher and author (born 1900)
- 1978 – Johnny O'Keefe, Australian singer-songwriter (born 1935)
- 1979 – Elizabeth Bishop, American poet and short-story writer (born 1911)
- 1980 – Hattie Jacques, English actress and producer (born 1922)
- 1980 – Jean Robic, French cyclist (born 1921)
- 1981 – Anwar Sadat, Egyptian colonel and politician, 3rd President of Egypt, Nobel Prize laureate (born 1918)
- 1983 – Terence Cooke, American cardinal (born 1921)
- 1985 – Nelson Riddle, American composer, conductor, and bandleader (born 1921)
- 1986 – Alexander Kronrod, Russian mathematician and computer scientist (born 1921)
- 1989 – Bette Davis, American actress (born 1908)
- 1990 – Bahriye Üçok, Turkish sociologist and politician (born 1919)
- 1991 – Igor Talkov, Russian singer-songwriter (born 1956)
- 1992 – Denholm Elliott, English actor (born 1922)
- 1992 – Bill O'Reilly, Australian cricketer and sportscaster (born 1905)
- 1993 – Nejat Eczacıbaşı, Turkish chemist, businessman, and philanthropist, founded Eczacıbaşı (born 1913)
- 1993 – Larry Walters, American truck driver and pilot (born 1949)
- 1995 – Benoît Chamoux, French mountaineer (born 1961)
- 1997 – Johnny Vander Meer, American baseball player and manager (born 1914)
- 1998 – Mark Belanger, American baseball player (born 1944)
- 1999 – Amália Rodrigues, Portuguese singer and actress (born 1920)
- 1999 – Gorilla Monsoon, American wrestler and sportscaster (born 1937)
- 2000 – Richard Farnsworth, American actor and stuntman (born 1920)
- 2001 – Arne Harris, American director and producer (born 1934)
- 2002 – Prince Claus of the Netherlands (born 1926)
- 2006 – Bertha Brouwer, Dutch sprinter (born 1930)
- 2006 – Eduardo Mignogna, Argentinian director and screenwriter (born 1940)
- 2006 – Buck O'Neil, American baseball player and manager (born 1911)
- 2006 – Wilson Tucker, American author and critic (born 1914)
- 2007 – Babasaheb Bhosale, Indian lawyer and politician, 8th Chief Minister of Maharashtra (born 1921)
- 2007 – Laxmi Mall Singhvi, Indian scholar, jurist, and politician (born 1931)
- 2008 – Peter Cox, Australian public servant and politician (born 1925)
- 2009 – Douglas Campbell, Scottish-Canadian actor and screenwriter (born 1922)
- 2010 – Rhys Isaac, South-African-Australian historian and author (born 1937)
- 2010 – Antonie Kamerling, Dutch television and film actor, and musician (born 1966)
- 2011 – Diane Cilento, Australian actress and author (born 1932)
- 2012 – Chadli Bendjedid, Algerian colonel and politician, 3rd President of Algeria (born 1929)
- 2012 – Anthony John Cooke, English organist and composer (born 1931)
- 2012 – Nick Curran, American singer-songwriter, guitarist, and producer (born 1977)
- 2012 – Albert, Margrave of Meissen (born 1943)
- 2012 – Joseph Meyer, American lawyer and politician, 19th Secretary of State of Wyoming (born 1941)
- 2012 – B. Satya Narayan Reddy, Indian lawyer and politician, 19th Governor of West Bengal (born 1927)
- 2012 – J. J. C. Smart, English-Australian philosopher and academic (born 1920)
- 2013 – Ulysses Curtis, American-Canadian football player and coach (born 1926)
- 2013 – Rift Fournier, American screenwriter and producer (born 1936)
- 2013 – Paul Rogers, English actor (born 1917)
- 2013 – Nico van Kampen, Dutch physicist and academic (born 1921)
- 2014 – Vic Braden, American tennis player and coach (born 1929)
- 2014 – Igor Mitoraj, German-Polish sculptor (born 1944)
- 2014 – Diane Nyland, Canadian actress, director and choreographer (born 1944)
- 2014 – Marian Seldes, American actress (born 1928)
- 2014 – Serhiy Zakarlyuka, Ukrainian footballer and manager (born 1976)
- 2014 – Feridun Buğeker, Turkish football player (born 1933)
- 2015 – Árpád Göncz, Hungarian author, playwright, and politician, 1st President of Hungary (born 1922)
- 2015 – Vladimir Shlapentokh, Ukrainian-American sociologist, historian, political scientist, and academic (born 1926)
- 2015 – Juan Vicente Ugarte del Pino, Peruvian historian, lawyer, and jurist (born 1923)
- 2017 – Ralphie May, American stand-up comedian and actor (born 1972)
- 2017 – David Marks, British architect, designer of the London Eye (born 1952)
- 2018 – Scott Wilson, American actor (born 1942)
- 2018 – Montserrat Caballé, Spanish soprano (born 1933)
- 2019 – Ginger Baker, English drummer (born 1939)
- 2019 – Eddie Lumsden, Australian rugby league player (born 1936)
- 2019 – Rip Taylor, American actor and comedian (born 1931)
- 2020 – Eddie Van Halen, Dutch-American guitarist, songwriter, and producer (born 1955)
- 2020 – Johnny Nash, American singer-songwriter (born 1940)
- 2024 – Dave Hobson, American politician (born 1936)
- 2024 – Johan Neeskens, Dutch footballer and manager (born 1951)
- 2026 – Eva Marie Saint, American actress (born 1924)

== Holidays and observances ==
- Christian feast day:
  - Bruno of Cologne
  - Faith
  - Blessed Isidore De Loor
  - Blessed Juan de Palafox y Mendoza
  - Blessed Marie Rose Durocher
  - Mary Frances of the Five Wounds
  - Pardulphus
  - Sagar of Laodicea
  - October 6 (Eastern Orthodox liturgics)
  - William Tyndale (commemoration, Anglicanism), with Myles Coverdale (Episcopal Church (USA))
- World Space Week (October 4–10)
- Day of Commemoration and National Mourning (Turkmenistan)
- Dukla Pass Victims Day (Slovakia)
- German-American Day (United States)
- Memorial Day for the Martyrs of Arad (Hungary)
- Teachers' Day (Sri Lanka)
- Yom Kippur War commemorations:
  - Armed Forces Day (Egypt)
  - Tishreen Liberation Day (Syria)
