= Peru–Venezuela relations =

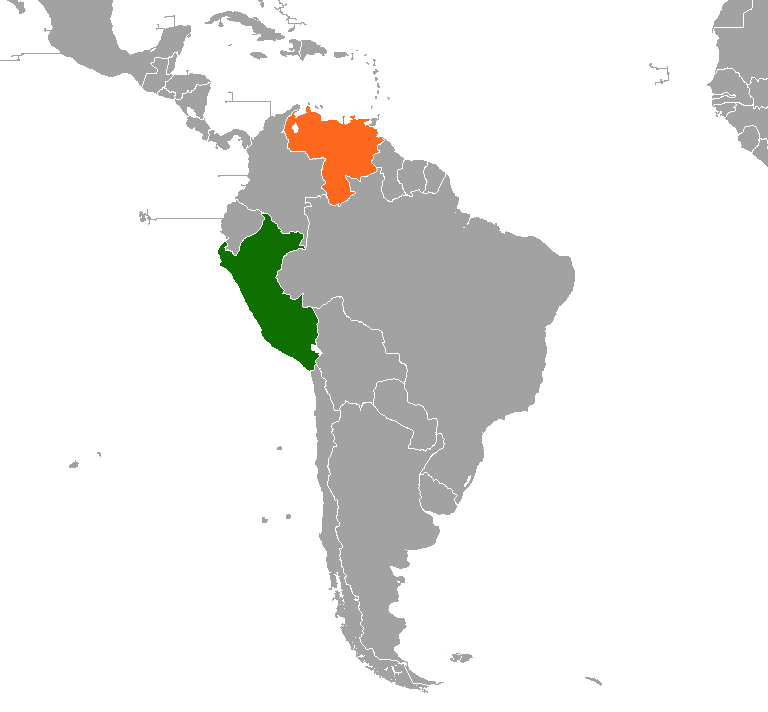
- Peru: Venezuela

Diplomatic mission
- Embassy of Peru, Lima: Embassy of Venezuela, Caracas

Peru–Venezuela relations was the bilateral relations between Peru and Venezuela. Both countries were members of the Spanish Empire, and are members of the Latin American Integration Association, Organization of American States and United Nations.

As of 2021, the largest share of immigrants in Peru are from Venezuela, representing 86,8% of foreign citizens in the country. This is in contrast to the 2% represented by 1,794 immigrants in 2012.

In 2024, both nations closed their respective embassies as a result of the 2024 Venezuelan presidential election.

== History ==
=== 19th century ===
Both countries belonged to the Spanish Empire, being administered as the Viceroyalty of Peru and the Captaincy General of Venezuela, respectively. After the wars of independence, Peru established relations with Colombia on June 6, 1822. With the collapse of the state, the State of Venezuela declared its independence from Colombia, but relations were only established in 1853, when Peru sent diplomat Pedro Gálvez Egúsquiza on a mission to establish relations with Central America and New Granada during the Filibuster War.

During the Chilean occupation of Peru, Venezuelan president Antonio Guzmán Blanco refused to recognise the government installed by Chile and instead recognised the Ayaucho-based government of Lizardo Montero Flores.

=== 20th century ===
The Venezuelan government broke diplomatic relations with Peru after the self-coup in 1992. After the second attempted coup in Venezuela in November 1992, most of the military members of the coup fled to Peru, where they were received by Alberto Fujimori as political prisoners in April.

=== 21st century ===
In 2001, both countries froze their relations and withdrew their ambassadors due to the situation in which Vladimiro Montesinos was captured in Caracas after a failed secret extraction operation led by the Peruvian Minister of the Interior, Ketín Vidal. Relations were normalized after Alejandro Toledo took office and the visit of Hugo Chávez after the Bolivarian revolution.

On September 13, 2015, the Peruvian Foreign Ministry expressed its "concern about the situation" in Venezuela after the conviction of Leopoldo López, former mayor of Chacao and opponent of the government of Nicolás Maduro. The Peruvian ambassador to the Organization of American States, Luis Chuquihuara, proposed the creation of a dialogue table.

On August 11, 2016, the Peruvian Congress approved the motion of solidarity in favor of Venezuela due to the political and humanitarian crisis facing the country. On March 30, 2017, the Peruvian Foreign Ministry announced the definitive withdrawal of its ambassador in Venezuela (and the expulsion of its Venezuelan counterpart) after the Supreme Court of Venezuela assumed the powers of the National Assembly of Venezuela. In 2017, it was approved to grant temporary permits to Venezuelans in Peru for one year. The measure to process the permit lasted until December 31, 2018.

On August 8, 2017, Peru signed, together with other American countries, the Declaration of Lima, that "condemns the rupture of the democratic order in Venezuela." On September 26, 2018, Peru, together with 5 American countries, requested the International Criminal Court's prosecutor to investigate Venezuela for alleged crimes against humanity and human rights abuses under the government of Nicolás Maduro. In 2019, Peru banned Maduro and 99 members of his regime from entering the country. On January 10, 2019, the Peruvian government called its chargé d'affaires in Venezuela for consultation.

On January 23, 2019, the Peruvian Government recognised Juan Guaidó as interim president of Venezuela. On January 29, 2019, the Parliament of Venezuela appointed Carlos Eduardo Scull Raygada as diplomatic representative in Peru, being recognised on January 31. Scull presented his credentials to president Martín Vizcarra on February 21. During this period, the Venezuelan embassy in Lima remained open, although relations were only maintained to a consular level. Due to Scull's inability and unwillingness to occupy the embassy to avoid another diplomatic incident, a parallel embassy was opened in the district of Pueblo Libre until 2021.

On January 15, 2019, Peru announced that Venezuelans who wished to enter Peruvian territory would need a travel visa as of June 15, 2019. Likewise, the Venezuelan government followed suit starting on June 15, 2019. On September 11, 2019, Peru voted in abstention to call a meeting of the members of the Inter-American Treaty of Reciprocal Assistance (TIAR) to discuss the situation in Venezuela.

In 2021, under the government of Pedro Castillo, Peru and Venezuela reestablished diplomatic relations with the appointment of Richard Fredy Rojas García as ambassador in Caracas and the accession of Alexander Gabriel Yánez Deleuze as Venezuelan ambassador in Lima. In December 2021, the appointment of the diplomat Librado Augusto Orozco Zapata as the new ambassador of Peru in Venezuela was made official. The Peruvian ambassador presented his credentials to Maduro on January 17, 2022. and the Venezuelan ambassador presented his credentials to Castillo on March 22, 2022,

On July 29, 2024, Venezuela announced a breakup of diplomatic relations with Peru and other Latin American countries, because the Peruvian government denounced Maduro's victory at 2024 Venezuelan presidential election as fraudulent. On July 30, Peru officially recognized opposition candidate Edmundo González as the president-elect of Venezuela.

== See also ==
- Foreign relations of Venezuela
- Foreign relations of Peru
- List of ambassadors of Peru to Venezuela
- List of ambassadors of Venezuela to Peru

== Bibliography ==
- Perú: Estadísticas de la Emigración Internacional de Peruanos e Inmigración de Extranjeros, 1990 – 2011 (PDF) (in Spanish). Lima: INEI. 2012. Archived from the original (PDF) on 2014-02-13.
- Perú: Estadísticas de la Emigración Internacional de Peruanos e Inmigración de Extranjeros, 1990 – 2021 (PDF) (in Spanish). Lima: INEI. 2022.
