= List of ambassadors of Venezuela to Peru =

Ambassador of Venezuela to Peru
- Coat of arms of Venezuela
- Ministry of Foreign Affairs
- Appointer: The president of Venezuela
- Inaugural holder: Andrés María Álvarez
- Formation: 1845

The extraordinary and plenipotentiary ambassador of Venezuela to the Republic of Peru is the official representative of the Bolivarian Republic of Venezuela to the Republic of Peru.

Relations between both countries were established in 1853, and relations have been continued since, although relations have twice been frozen (but never severed): in 2001, over a dispute regarding the extradition of Vladimiro Montesinos, and in 2017, when Peru recalled its ambassador and expelled its Venezuelan counterpart.

== List of representatives ==
| Name | Portrait | Appointed | Letters of credence / Exequatur | Term end | Head of state | Notes |
|---|---|---|---|---|---|---|
| Andrés María Álvarez | | December 6, 1845 | September 15, 1846 | January 2, 1860 | Carlos Soublette | As Consul of Venezuela in Lima. |
| Germán Suárez Flamerich | | May 20, 1950 | June 24, 1950 | November 24, 1950 | Carlos Delgado Chalbaud | As Ambassador Extraordinary and Plenipotentiary. |
| Juan García Gruber | | 1953 | | ? | Marcos Pérez Jiménez | As Ambassador Extraordinary and Plenipotentiary. |
| Gabriel Briceño Pacheco | | March 5, 1958 | April 10, 1958 | October 9, 1959 | Wolfgang Larrazábal | As Ambassador Extraordinary and Plenipotentiary. |
| Arturo Briceño | | October 9, 1959 | November 21, 1959 | April 22, 1964 | Rómulo Betancourt | As Ambassador Extraordinary and Plenipotentiary. |
| Juan Ernesto Rothe Farbos | | April 22, 1964 | May 19, 1964 | May 6, 1966 | Raúl Leoni | As Ambassador Extraordinary and Plenipotentiary. |
| Esteban Rodríguez Landaeta | | May 6, 1966 | May 26, 1966 | May 17, 1968 | Raúl Leoni | As Ambassador Extraordinary and Plenipotentiary. |
| Julio Ramos | | May 17, 1968 | June 1968 | October 25, 1968 | Raúl Leoni | As Ambassador Extraordinary and Plenipotentiary. |
Relations severed by Venezuela due to the 1992 Peruvian self-coup
| Horacio Arteaga Acosta | | | November 10, 1993 | | Ramón José Velásquez | As Ambassador Extraordinary and Plenipotentiary. He was a hostage during the Japanese embassy hostage crisis from December 17 to 22. |
| Rodrigo Arcaya Smith | | June 21, 2000 | December 7, 2000 | ? | Hugo Chávez | As Ambassador Extraordinary and Plenipotentiary. |
| Gonzalo Jesús Gómez Jaén | | August 21, 2000 | September 15, 2000 | after July 2004 | Hugo Chávez | As Ambassador Extraordinary and Plenipotentiary. |
| Cruz Manuel Martínez Ramírez | | August 8, 2005 | 2005 | May 2006 | Hugo Chávez | As Ambassador Extraordinary and Plenipotentiary. |
Relations suspended between both countries after a diplomatic incident
| Armando José Laguna | | February 2007 | | after March 2009 | Hugo Chávez | As Ambassador Extraordinary and Plenipotentiary; first representative after the severing of relations. After his term, he left for Honduras. |
| Arístides Medina Rubio | | August 2009 | N/A | N/A | Hugo Chávez | His appointment was made official on December 14, 2009. However, it was annulled before he could take office one month later due to a political crisis involving the Peruvian approval of Manuel Rosales's request for political asylum and due to the fact that Medina was under house arrest after being accused of sexually assaulting the underaged daughter of Héctor Soto, Venezuela's then Culture Minister. |
| Alexander Yáñez | | June 11, 2010 | | July 2014 | Hugo Chávez | First served as the embassy's third secretary, being appointed as chargé d'affaires on June 11. During his tenure as ambassador, which lasted until July 2014, he was in charge of the embassy's ceremonies during the death of Hugo Chávez, which included a book of condolence and the flag at half-mast. |
| Diego Alfredo Molero Bellavia | | 2014 | October 2014 | July 11, 2017 | Nicolás Maduro | During his tenure, bilateral relations were frozen and he was expelled on July 11, 2017. |
Relations suspended by Peru; Juan Guaidó recognised as president in 2019
| Carlos Eduardo Scull Raygada | | January 29, 2019 | February 21, 2019 | January 2022 | Juan Guaidó | After Peru suspended its relations in 2017, officially recognising Juan Guaidó as the legitimate head of state of Venezuela, Scull was appointed by the National Assembly as the diplomatic representative to Peru. During this period, the Venezuelan embassy in Lima remained open, although relations were only maintained to a consular level. Due to Scull's inability and unwillingness to occupy the embassy to avoid another diplomatic incident, a parallel embassy was opened in the district of Pueblo Libre until 2021. |
Relations normalised in 2021; Maduro recognised by Peru again
| Alexander Yáñez | | October 15, 2021 | March 22, 2022 | July 29, 2024 | Nicolás Maduro | Ambassador Extraordinary and Plenipotentiary. Appointed after the normalisation of bilateral relations. |

== See also ==
- Peru–Venezuela relations
- List of ambassadors of Peru to Venezuela
