= Foreign policy of the Ollanta Humala administration =

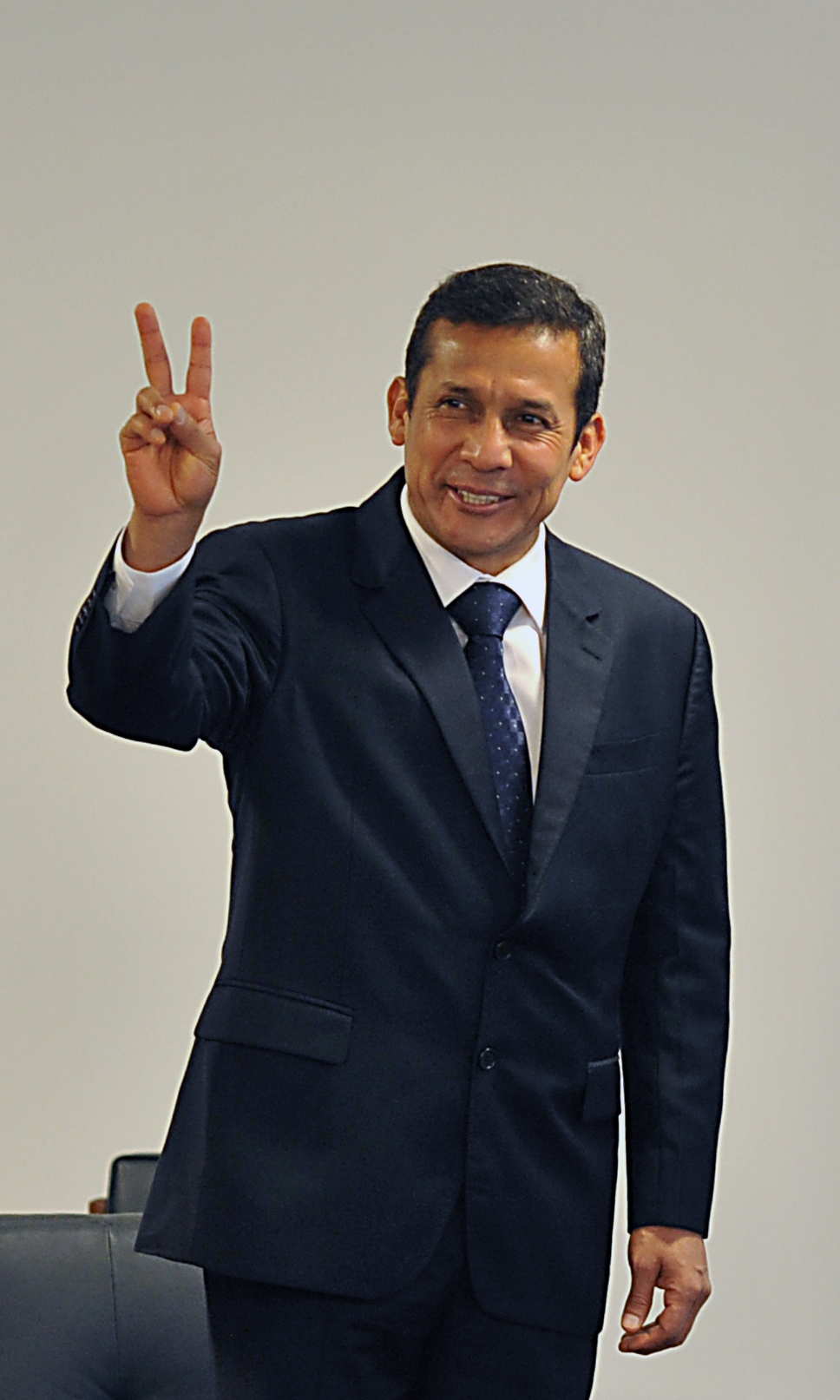
President Ollanta Humala in 2011

The foreign policy of the Ollanta Humala concerns the policy initiatives made towards other states by the former President of Peru, in difference to past, or future, Peruvian foreign policy as represented by his Foreign Minister Rafael Roncagliolo. Humala's foreign policy was based on relations with other states of the Americas.

== Background ==
In 2006, Ollanta Humala lost a run-off to Alan García. One reason for his loss was a perception that he too close to Venezuelan President Hugo Chávez and the latter's Bolivarian revolution based on the principles of 21st century socialism and that he was a part of the "pink tide" in Latin America. However, five years later he beat Keiko Fujimori in a run-off, in part because he distanced himself from Chavez and aligned with the ideas of Lula da Silva in Brazil, who also experienced similar rapid growth as the economy of Peru.

== 2006 presidential candidacy ==
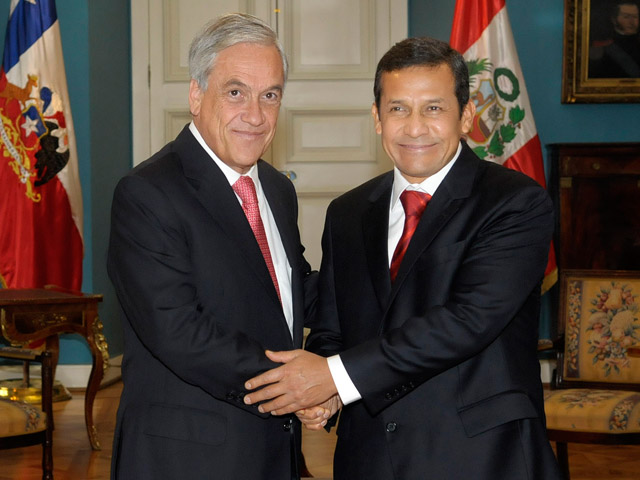
Humala with Chile's president Sebastián Piñera in 2011

Questioned by the media, Humala denied any ties to Venezuela's president Hugo Chávez, but said he would welcome Chávez's support in the 2006 presidential election. On January 3, 2006, Evo Morales made his first official visit to Venezuela as President-Elect of Bolivia. Humala attended the official ceremonies held in the Miraflores presidential palace in Caracas where both Morales and Chávez pledged their support to Humala in his bid for the 2006 presidential race in Peru. In objection to this, Peru recalled its ambassador to Venezuela, Carlos Urrutia, in protest against Venezuela's alleged interference in the election.

In March 2006, Humala also met with President Néstor Kirchner of Argentina in Buenos Aires. During the meeting, Humala stated that regional integration took priority over bilateral agreements with the United States and called Kirchner a "brother" in the cause to integrate Latin America. Humala also travelled to meet with Brazilian President Lula da Silva and officials of his government to discuss regional integration.

On May 8, 2006, Humala met with Bolivian President Evo Morales in Copacabana, Bolivia on the Bolivian border with Peru. While meeting with Morales Humala stated that he stood in "solidarity with the historical and legitimate demand of the Bolivian Republic" of access to the Pacific Ocean which Bolivia lost after the War of the Pacific when Chile annexed what is now the Antofagasta Region of Chile. Humala also explicitly stated that he was not opposed to a free trade agreement with the United States but said that any free trade agreement with the United States would have to be negotiated through the Andean Community (CAN) and signed with approval of all members of CAN. During the meeting Humala emphasised the need to maintain CAN as a bloc to negotiate with the United States and asked Morales to work to help maintain the CAN, referring to the CAN's recent troubles with Venezuela removing itself as a member in protest to the signing of trade agreements with the U.S. by Peru and Colombia.

== 2011 president-elect ==
Prior to his official inauguration Humala undertook a tour of American states including Bolivia, Colombia and the United States (his tour of Venezuela was postponed til 15 July 2011 due to Chavez's health concerns as he underwent surgery in Cuba). Upon resumption of the Venezuela leg of his tour the business community in Peru were concerned that Humala may drift back towards to Chavez's policies.

=== Pan-Americas tour ===
His first visit as president-elect was to Brazil. Following a meeting with Brazilian President Dilma Rousseff he said though the situation in Peru and Brazil is different, both countries' plan was similar along the lines of economic growth and prudent macroeconomic management. He added that: "We are pleased with this meeting. Brazil is an important strategic partner for Peru. Brazil is a successful model of economic growth." He then left for Paraguay where he met President Fernando Lugo, following which he planned to visit Uruguay, Argentina and Chile.

Following a meeting in 2006 with Bolivian President Evo Morales in Copacabana on the Bolivian border with Peru, in which Humala stated that he stood in "solidarity with the historical and legitimate demand of the Bolivian Republic," after his electoral victory in 2011 he went back to Bolivia and made calls for the resurrection of the Peru–Bolivian Confederation. Bolivian Communications Minister Ivan Canelas announced that he would meet Morales and discuss Bolivia's maritime claim against Chile (for which Peru expressed tacit support). Humala also added that he had "a widely shared vision of integration [with Morales]. For me, it's an important meeting, [Bolivia] is an Aymara and sister nation." (However Peru's large indigenous population is mostly Quechua)

Humala also visited Colombia where he met one of the only two right-wing president's left in South America, Juan Manuel Santos. The two leaders of talked integration projects between Colombia and Peru.

During a visit to Washington, D.C. Humala also met Organization of American States' Secretary-General Jose Miguel Insulza in which he said Peru intends to work towards greater regional integration. During the same tour he also met with US Secretary of State Hillary Clinton on Washington, D.C. During the meeting US President Barack Obama made a surprise appearance to meet Humala, a visit that was appreciated by the latter. Obama spoke of the importance of "sound market-based economic policies with efforts to increase economic and social inclusion." Peruvian ambassador Luis Valdivieso said that the visit was an "extraordinary step" in starting relations at the highest level between the Humala government and the United States.

During his postponed trip to Venezuela, Humala was personally welcomed by Chavez at Miraflores Palace. He reiterated calls for regional integration saying "As 200 years ago, when we fought colonialism, today we have common enemies like poverty, inequalities, drug trafficking and so many threats against our countries. I have come as a friend and a brother; and this brotherhood leads us to a similar future." He also wished Chavez a recovery from his cancer treatment: "We are giving you support, please count on our forces and the prayers of the Peruvian people, who want your recovery because you have a mission to accomplish." Humala also paid a visit to Simón Bolívar's birthplace house and met with officials at the headquarters of the Corporacion Andina de Fomento.

He was then due to travel to Mexico on 18 July. In meeting President Felipe Calderón at Palace Los Pinos he said that "With Mexico, after July 28, we are going to improve relations that already are excellent. We want to improve commercial exchange even more so" and "strengthen relations in the area of education." They also discussed the general strengthening of Mexico-Peru relations. After Mexico he visited Cuba, a move that Granma quoted Humala as saying that he had come to visit a "sister" country and to share an "open agenda" with President Raúl Castro. He also met leftist political icon and Cuban commander-in-chief Fidel Castro. The two leaders talked of the "happy atmosphere" as well as the "complicated situation in Latin America." His talks with Raúl Castro focused on Cuba-Peru relations and the "need" to enhance education via Cuba's "Yes I Can" educational programme. In doing so he cited Cuba's success in contributing to the eradication of illiteracy in countries such as Venezuela, Nicaragua, Bolivia and Ecuador.

=== Inauguration ===
His inauguration on 28 July was attended by regional leaders. Foreign dignitaries such as Colombia's Juan Manuel Santos were scheduled to attend the event, along with Brazil's Dilma Rousseff, Uruguay's José Mujica, Panama's Ricardo Martinelli, (and his wife First Lady Marta Linares de Martinelli), Argentina's Cristina Fernández de Kirchner, Chile's Sebastián Piñera, Ecuador's Rafael Correa, Bolivia's Evo Morales, Guatemala's Álvaro Colom, Honduras’ Porfirio Lobo, South Africa's Jacob Zuma and Georgia's Mikheil Saakashvili. They would also be joined by Cuban First Vice President Jose Ramon Machado Ventura and his delegation, Spain's crown prince Felipe, Prince of Asturias, Secretary-general of the Organization of American States Jose Miguel Insulza, the U.S. ambassador, the brother of South Korean President Lee Myung-bak, Lee Sang-deuk of the incumbent Grand National Party and Chinese President Hu Jintao's special envoy, Minister of Agriculture Han Changfu.

== State visits as president ==
Humala's first official foreign trip was to Spain. He also traveled to Colombia for the 6th Summit of the Americas. He also attended the 6th BRICS summit in Brasil in 2014.

== Relations with individual states ==
=== Chile ===
The new Foreign Minister Rafael Roncagliolo met his Chilean counterpart Alfredo Moreno Charme prior to taking office. Following the meeting he said that Moreno was "a concerned person, who has an attitude of dialogue and does not encourage unnecessary antagonism" and added that in regards to the Chilean–Peruvian maritime dispute "by going to the Hague, what we are looking for is peaceful understanding, avoid lawsuits and verbal arguments. Peru has taken the position of a modern civilized nation to go to court. Resolve conflicts by means of right reason, not force." However he also commented on Chilean military spending vis-a-vis its neighbours: "When a country develops a quite disproportionate military capacity compared to their neighbours, others are right to worry. That is the situation we face. Yes, we should worry. Chile's military spending is disproportionate to the neighbours. That is why Peru, in UNASUR is promoting transparency and a reduction of military spending. There are more important things you must invest in Latin America. All countries must have a credible military defense, and Peru has not maintained one like this."

Prior to Humala's visit to Bolivia in his pre-inauguration Pan-Americas tour, Peru agreed to cede territory claimed by Bolivia against Chile so as to facilitate resolution of the maritime claim. The 1929 Peace and Friendship treaty, which formalised relations between the three states following the War of the Pacific, requires Peru's "prior agreement" to pursue further negotiations for Chile to cede former Peruvian territory to a third party and settle the conflict.
