= List of ambassadors of Peru to Trinidad and Tobago =

Ambassador of Peru to the Republic of Trinidad and Tobago
- Great Seal of Peru
- Ministry of Foreign Affairs
- Appointer: The president of Peru
- Website: Embassy of Peru in Trinidad and Tobago

The extraordinary and plenipotentiary ambassador of Peru to the Republic of Trinidad and Tobago is the official representative of the Republic of Peru to the Republic of Trinidad and Tobago.

The ambassador in Port of Spain is accredited to neighbouring countries, such as Guyana, (Note: Previously represented by the ambassador in Caracas.) member states of CARICOM, (Note: Meaning: Antigua and Barbuda; Bahamas; Dominica; Grenada; Jamaica; Saint Kitts and Nevis) and Barbados, Saint Lucia and Saint Vincent and the Grenadines. (Note: Said states are also members of CARICOM, but are treated as separate entities.) (Note: The Commonwealth Caribbean was previously represented from the Peruvian Consulate in San Juan, Puerto Rico. The region, however, has been generally neglected due to a lack of a Peruvian presence for decades.) Peru formerly maintained an embassy in Kingston, Jamaica, but closed it in 2008, along with other embassies.

Both countries established relations in 1968 and have maintained them since. The Peruvian embassy in Port of Spain was opened in the 1990s. It was closed at one point but reopened in 2014.

== List of representatives ==
Name	Term begin	Term end	President	Notes
Luis Santa María Calderón	2008	2009	Alan García	As ambassador; accredited from Venezuela.
Luis Enrique Martín Raygada Souza-Ferreira	2012	2013	Ollanta Humala	As ambassador; accredited from Venezuela.
Luis Rodomiro Hernández Ortiz	May 1, 2017	2020	Pedro Pablo Kuczynski	As ambassador.
David Francisco Málaga Ego Aguirre	August 25, 2020	2026	Martín Vizcarra	As ambassador; concurrent with Guyana, Barbados, Saint Vincent and the Grenadines, Saint Lucia and CARICOM.

== See also ==
- List of ambassadors of Peru to Jamaica
- List of ambassadors of Peru to Venezuela
