= Luis Felipe de Las Casas Grieve =

Peruvian politician and engineer

Luis Felipe de Las Casas Grieve (1916–1988) was a Peruvian politician and engineer. He was a featured member of APRA (Alianza Popular Revolucionaria Americana), centre-left Peruvian political party. During the government of Juan Velasco Alvarado was Ambassador to Venezuela.

He is perhaps best remembered for dying in the middle of the floor of the Congress of Peru after suffering a heart attack following a heated speech on the nationalization of banks.

== See also ==
- American Popular Revolutionary Alliance
