= Peru–Trinidad and Tobago relations =

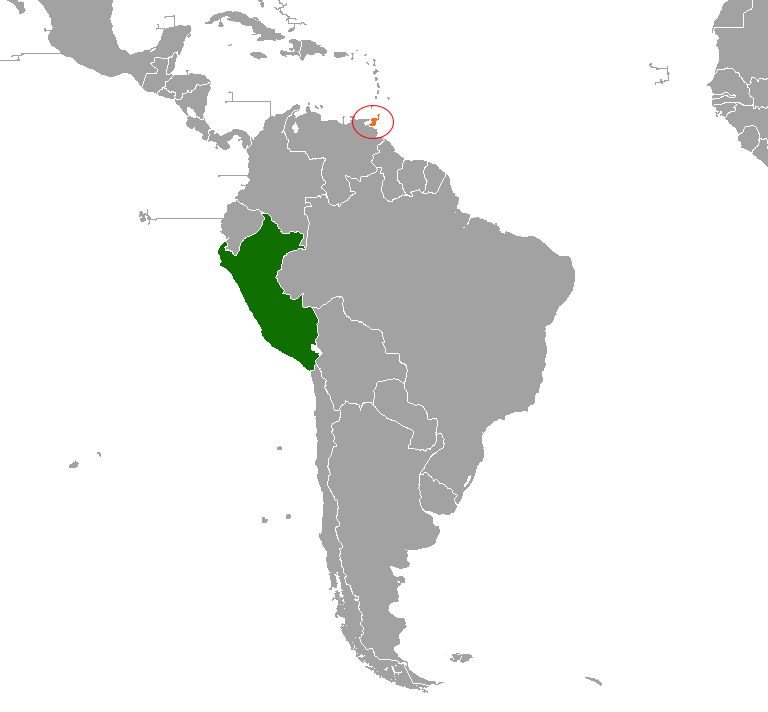

- Peru: Trinidad and Tobago

Peru–Trinidad and Tobago relations refers to the bilateral relations between Peru and Trinidad and Tobago. Peru has an embassy in Port of Spain while Trinidad and Tobago has a Consulate in Lima.

== History ==
In 2017, Peruvian Ambassador Luis Rodomiro Hernández Ortiz commended T&T on its role to enforce democracy and commented on further solidifying relations between the nations. Both countries are members of the Organization of American States.

== Trade ==
In 2017, 3.5% or US$217 Million worth of exports went to Peru and Peru exported US$17.8 Million to Trinidad and Tobago in 2017.

== See also ==
- Foreign relations of Peru
- Foreign relations of Trinidad and Tobago
- List of ambassadors of Peru to Trinidad and Tobago
