= List of ambassadors of Peru to Jamaica =

Ambassador of Peru to Jamaica
- Great Seal of Peru
- Ministry of Foreign Affairs; 23 Barbados Avenue
- Style: His Excellency
- Appointer: The president of Peru
- Final holder: Luis Wilfredo Sandiga Cabrera
- Abolished: 2006

The extraordinary and plenipotentiary ambassador of Peru to Jamaica was the official representative of the Republic of Peru to Jamaica, resident in Kingston.

Peru maintained an embassy in Kingston until 2006. It had previously been closed in 1989 and reopened in 1995. The ambassador in Port of Spain is currently accredited to CARICOM, and thus, to Jamaica.

== List of representatives ==
Name	Portrait	Term begin	Term end	President	Notes
Fernando Rodríguez Oliva		before 1974	June 14, 1976	Juan Velasco Alvarado	As ambassador. He was murdered outside of his residence in Kingston.
Augusto Dammert		July 1983	1985	Fernando Belaúnde	As ambassador.
Humberto Urteaga Dulanto		2000	2003	Alberto Fujimori	As ambassador.
Luis Wilfredo Sandiga Cabrera		2003	December 31, 2006	Alejandro Toledo	Final resident ambassador to Jamaica.

== See also ==
- List of ambassadors of Peru to Trinidad and Tobago
