= Juan Vicente Ugarte del Pino =

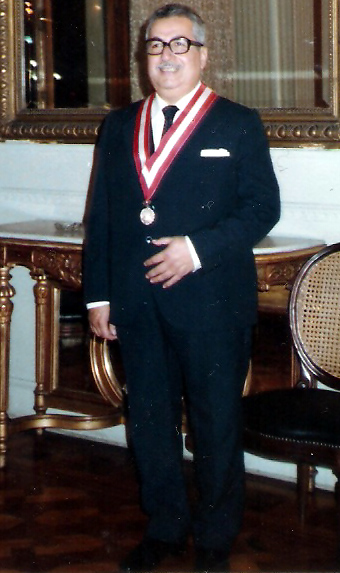
Vicente Ugarte del Pino at the Supreme Court of Peru.

Juan Vicente Ugarte del Pino (June 12, 1923 – October 6, 2015) was a Peruvian historian, jurist and lawyer. A judge and noted jurist, Ugarte del Pino was a member of the legal team which represented Peru before the International Court of Justice (ICJ) during a 2008 case over the Chilean–Peruvian maritime dispute.

Ugarte del Pino served as the dean of the Bar Association of Lima (Colegio de Abogados de Lima) (CAL) from 1974 to 1975, which coincided with the dictatorship of President Juan Velasco Alvarado. Ugarte del Pino was a prominent critics of the erosion of the rule of law in Peru by Velasco. The Velasco government prosecuted and imprisoned Ugarte del Pino for counterrevolutionary crimes for his vocal opposition. Juan Velasco Alvarado was overthrown in 1975.

Vicente Ugarte del Pino was appointed to the Supreme Court of Peru in 1980. During his tenure on the Supreme Court, Ugarte del Pino served as the President of the Supreme Court's Criminal Chamber in 1986, President of the Supreme Court of Peru in 1987, and the President of the Supreme Court's Civil Chamber in 1989.

In 2008, the Peruvian government appointed Ugarte del Pino to the legal team which represented Peru at the International Court of Justice (ICJ) in The Hague during its dispute with Chile over the ongoing Chilean–Peruvian maritime dispute. The case was known as "Case Concerning Maritime Delimitation between the Republic of Peru and the Republic of Chile", or simply Peru v. Chile. The ICJ issued its final ruling in January 2014, granting Peru some additional maritime territory.

Vicente Ugarte del Pino died in at the Edgardo Rebagliati Martins National Hospital in the district of Jesús María in Lima, Peru, on October 6, 2015, at the age of 92. His death was confirmed by Mario Amoretti, the present dean of CAL.
