= Chilean–Peruvian maritime dispute =

Overview of the maritime dispute between Chile and Peru

The disputed area (left) and the boundary as per the ICJ ruling (right)

Perú v. Chile (also called the Chilean–Peruvian maritime dispute) was a public international law case concerning a territorial dispute between the South American republics of Peru and Chile over the sovereignty of an area at sea in the Pacific Ocean approximately 37,900 square kilometres (14,600 sq mi) in size. Peru contended that its maritime boundary delimitation with Chile was not fixed, but Chile claimed that it holds no outstanding border issues with Peru. On January 16, 2008, Peru brought forth the case to the International Court of Justice at The Hague, the Netherlands, which accepted the case and formally filed it as the Case concerning maritime delimitation between the Republic of Peru and the Republic of Chile - Perú v. Chile.

The dispute primarily concerned an area at sea between the parallel that crosses the end point of the land border between Chile and Peru, and the bisecting line perpendicular to the coasts of Chile and Peru. This line was formed by the overlapping of the baselines of both countries, forming a trapezoid of 67,139.4 square kilometres (25,922.7 sq mi). Peru requested an equitable division of the maritime territory, but Chile demanded sovereignty over approximately 38,000 square kilometres (15,000 sq mi) of the territory. On a secondary level, the dispute included the status of a maritime triangle to the left of the aforementioned trapezoid, approximately 28,471.86 square kilometres (10,993.05 sq mi) in size, which Chile considered a part of the international waters and Peru as a part of its maritime domain.

== Facts ==
The background of this dispute goes back to the mid-1980s. In 1985, the then Foreign Minister of Peru, Allan Wagner first addressed this issue formally with the Minister of Foreign Affairs of Chile at the time, Jaime del Valle. The following year, the Peruvian Ambassador Juan Miguel Bakula Patino had an interview with Foreign Minister Jaime del Valle on this matter, and handled a diplomatic note, dated 23 May 1986. By the aforementioned note, issued by the Embassy of Peru in Santiago de Chile, Peru stated its position regarding the necessity of "concluding a treaty on maritime boundaries", on the premise that it must reach a formal and definitive delimitation of maritime spaces, which complement the geographical proximity between Peru and Chile. In ICJ proceedings Chile disputes that these meeting was ever about Peru wanting a maritime boundary treaty, in the contrary Chile argued that Peru recognized the Treaties signed in the 1950s and that meetings had a totally different basis.

Chile ratified the Convention on the Law of the Sea in 1997 and, according to its text, in September 2000, deposited it with the United Nations. Its nautical charts indicated the parallel 18º21'00" South as the maritime boundary between the two countries. The constitution of Peru prevents its government to ratify the sea convention however its Peruvian Government formalized its position on the issue, through a note sent to the United Nations on January 7, 2001, which does not recognize the line of latitude as the maritime boundary between the two countries.

Public discussion on this subject was revived in 2005, when the Congress of Peru began to process a bill on determining the baseline of maritime domain, which are sequences of points that determine where it finishes the coastal edge and therefore begins the territorial sea as such, setting the width of the maritime domain of Peru to the distance of 200 nautical miles, using a line bisector in the south, bordering with Chile. The Peruvian law was passed and promulgated on November 3, 2005.

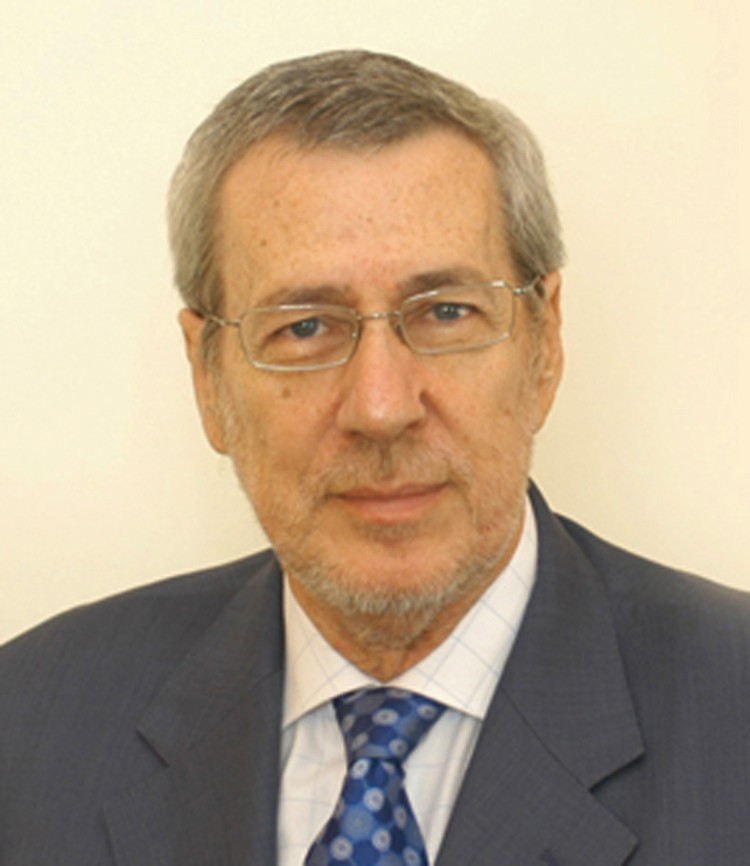
Ambassador Alberto van Klaveren

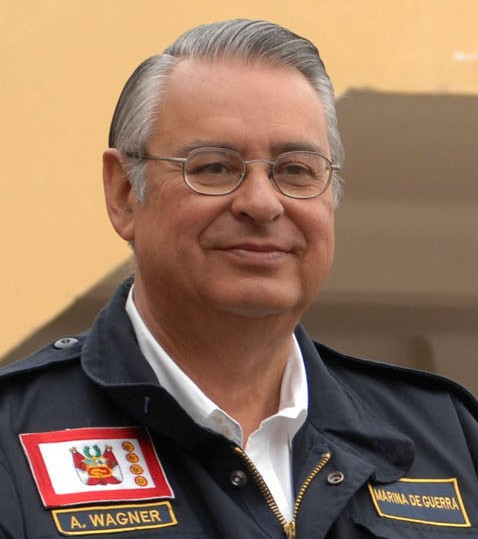
Ambassador Allan Wagner

On January 16, 2008, the government of Peru introduced in the International Court of Justice the "Case Concerning Maritime Delimitation between the Republic of Peru and the Republic of Chile", also called Peru v. Chile. The case is meant to adjudicate the re-delimitation of the maritime border between these two countries.

In the case, Peru, whose legal team included jurist Juan Vicente Ugarte del Pino, argued that the maritime boundary has never been defined by a treaty and should run on a southwestern direction from their land border, perpendicular to the natural slope of the South American coast in an equidistant angle from both coastlines. Chile claims that in trilateral treaties signed together with Peru and Ecuador in 1952 and 1954, it is clearly stated that a maritime boundary (written as "límite marítimo" in Spanish) runs in a western direction, parallel to the equator. The Chilean agent to the Court is former Undersecretary for Foreign Affairs, Ambassador Alberto van Klaveren. The Peruvian agent is the current Ambassador to The Netherlands, Allan Wagner.

== Judgment ==
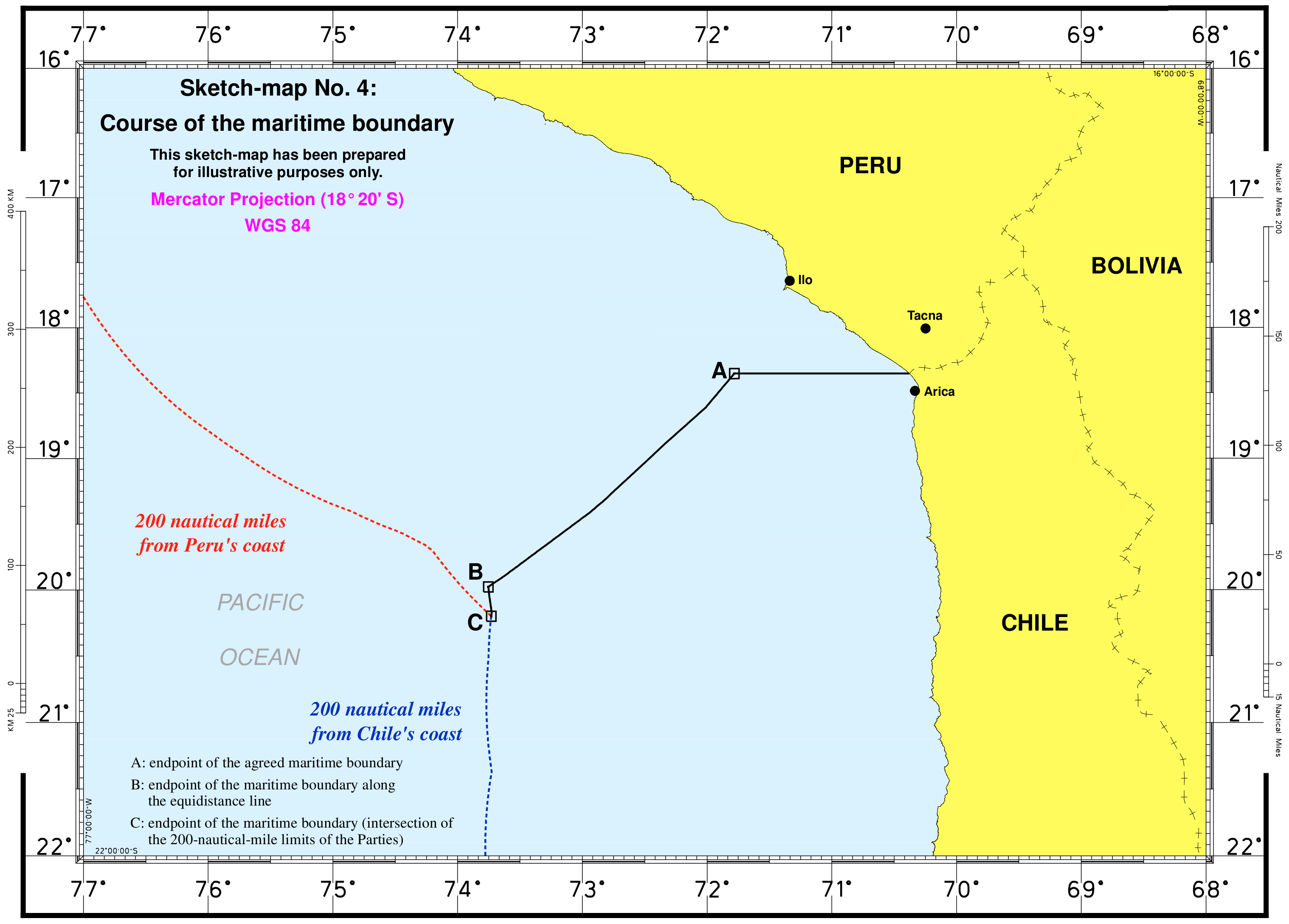
The maritime boundary between Chile and Peru as defined by the International Court of Justice on 27 January 2014.

On January 27, 2014, in the final ruling of the Court, Peru gained some maritime territory. The maritime boundary extends only to 80 nautical miles off of the coast. From that point, the new border runs in a southwest direction to a point that is 200 miles equidistant from the coast of the two countries.

Under the ruling, Chile lost control over part of its formerly claimed maritime territory and gives additional maritime territory to Peru.

From the 27 January 2014 court press release: The Court concludes that the maritime boundary between the Parties starts at the intersection of the parallel of latitude passing through Boundary Marker No. 1 with the low-water line, and extends for 80 nautical miles along that parallel of latitude to Point A. From this point, the maritime boundary runs along the equidistance line to Point B, and then along the 200-nautical-mile limit measured from the Chilean baselines to Point C. In view of the circumstances of the case, the Court has defined the course of the maritime boundary between the Parties without determining the precise geographical co-ordinates.*

== Significance ==
Chile - Peru relations
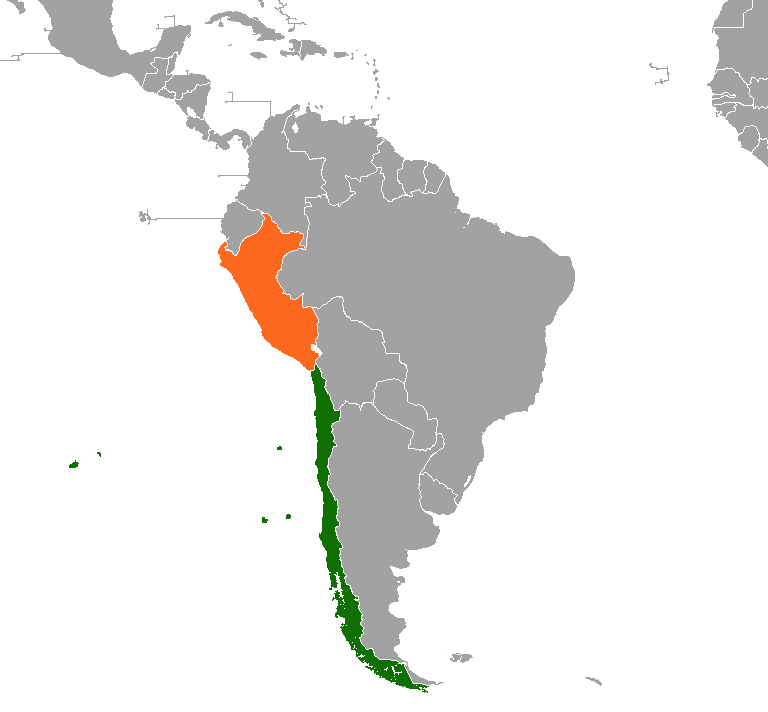
- Chile: Peru

Physicist Frank Duarte has been a consistent and early critic of the Chilean Government's handling of this dispute. In particular, he has sharply criticized President Sebastián Piñera's performance (deemed as favoring commercial interests over the interest of the Chilean people) and called for Chile's withdrawal from The Hague, early in 2012. Following the ruling, several political figures in Chile, of various political parties, have also called for Chile's withdrawal from The Hague that would, in addition, imply a withdrawal from the Pact of Bogota. Senators and members of parliament advocating this position include Ivan Moreira, Jorge Tarud, Jaime Orpis, and Fulvio Rossi. Former president Ricardo Lagos has added his voice to the criticism of the tribunal's ruling. Furthermore, the newly designated minister for foreign relations, Heraldo Muñoz, has declared that the topic of membership in the Pact of Bogota should be under "legitimate discussion". On February 11, 2014, President Sebastián Piñera, originally a strong advocate of The Hague, requested a report on the advantages and disadvantages of Chile's membership in the Pact of Bogota.

== See also ==
- Arica y Parinacota controversy
- Atacama Desert border dispute
- Chilean–Peruvian territorial dispute
- Foreign policy of the Ollanta Humala administration
- List of International Court of Justice cases
- Chilean Sea
- Antártica Chilena Province
- Chilean Antarctic Territory
- Patagonia
- Movimiento Archipiélago Soberano
