= List of ambassadors of Peru to Venezuela =

Ambassador of Peru to the Bolivarian Republic of Venezuela
- Great Seal of Peru
- Ministry of Foreign Affairs; Centro Financiero Madrid F. 6, Caracas
- Appointer: The president of Peru
- Website: Embassy of Peru in Venezuela

The extraordinary and plenipotentiary ambassador of Peru to the Bolivarian Republic of Venezuela is the official representative of the Republic of Peru to the Bolivarian Republic of Venezuela.

Relations between both countries were established in 1853, and relations have been continued since, although relations have twice been frozen (but never severed): in 2001, over a dispute regarding the extradition of Vladimiro Montesinos, and in 2017, when Peru recalled its ambassador and expelled its Venezuelan counterpart.

== List of representatives ==
Name	Portrait	Term begin	Term end	President	Notes
Pedro Gálvez Egúsquiza		August 5, 1856		Ramón Castilla	Minister plenipotentiary to Venezuela, as well as Central America (including neighbouring Costa Rica, El Salvador, Guatemala, Honduras, Nicaragua) and New Granada.
César Elejalde Chopitea		1924	1924	Augusto B. Leguía	Chargé d'affaires (a.i.)
Ernesto de Tezanos Pinto		1924	1936	Augusto B. Leguía	Envoy Extraordinary and Minister Plenipotentiary
Enrique Goytisolo Bolognesi		1942	1946	Manuel Prado Ugarteche	Envoy Extraordinary and Minister Plenipotentiary
Ricardo Boza Aizcorbe		1946	1949	José Luis Bustamante y Rivero	Ambassador
Eduardo Garland		1949	1957	Manuel A. Odría	Ambassador
Teodosio Cabada González-Prada		1957	1959	Manuel A. Odría	Ambassador
Pablo Abril de Vivero		1959	1961	Manuel Prado Ugarteche	Ambassador
Pedro Ugarteche Tizón		1961	1962	Manuel Prado Ugarteche	Ambassador
Guillermo Hoyos Osores		1963	1969	Fernando Belaúnde	Ambassador
José Alvarado Sánchez		1969	1972	Juan Velasco Alvarado	Ambassador
Luis Barrios Llona		1972	1975	Juan Velasco Alvarado	Ambassador
Luis Felipe de Las Casas Grieve		1975	1978	Juan Velasco Alvarado	Ambassador
Javier Pérez de Cuéllar		1978	1979	Francisco Morales Bermúdez	Ambassador
Jorge Guillermo Llosa Pautrat		1979	1982	Francisco Morales Bermúdez	Ambassador
Alfredo Ramos Suero		1982	?	Fernando Belaúnde	Ambassador
Jorge Raygada Cauvi		1988	1980	Alan García	Ambassador
Allan Wagner Tizón		1990	1992	Alberto Fujimori	Ambassador
Eduardo Raygada Morzán		1993	1996	Alberto Fujimori	Ambassador
Juan Castilla Meza		March 1, 1996	March 16, 1999	Alberto Fujimori	Last ambassador to the Republic of Venezuela before the Bolivarian Revolution.
Julio Balbuena López-Alfaro		1999	1999	Alberto Fujimori	Ambassador
Luis Marchand		2001	2002	Valentín Paniagua	Ambassador
Carlos Urrutia		October 6, 2002	May 22, 2006	Alejandro Toledo	Ambassador twice removed due to alleged Venezuelan interference during the 2006 Peruvian national election.
Luis Santa María Calderón		2007	2009	Alan García	Ambassador
Eric Anderson Machado		2011	2012	Alan García	Ambassador
Luis Raygada Souza-Ferreira		2012	2013	Ollanta Humala	Ambassador
Mario López Chávarri		2013	2017	Ollanta Humala	Ambassador. He was the last ambassador to Venezuela before the suspension of relations, being accredited to neighbouring Guyana and Suriname.
Richard Rojas García		N/A	N/A	Pedro Castillo	Rojas was named as ambassador on October 15, 2021, but his nomination was later annulled. He had been earlier proposed as ambassador to Panama, but said country did not respond to the proposal. Five days after the announcement, the Peruvian Judiciary issued an impediment to Richard Rojas from leaving the country for six months.
Librado Augusto Orozco Zapata		January 15, 2022	2024	Pedro Castillo	

== See also ==
- List of ambassadors of Venezuela to Peru
- List of ambassadors of Peru to Ecuador
- List of ambassadors of Peru to Colombia
- List of ambassadors of Peru to Trinidad and Tobago
