= Mar de Grau =

Body of water in the Pacific Ocean under Peruvian control

Map showing the Grau's Sea (1,140,646 km^{2})

The Mar de Grau (Spanish: Grau's Sea) is the official name for the body of water in the Pacific Ocean under the control of the South American country of Peru. This body of water extends in length approximately 3,079.50 km, from the parallel of the Boca de Capones in northern Peru to the parallel of the Punto Concordia and the parallel in front of the city of Tacna in southern Peru. In terms of width, the maritime zone extends from the Peruvian coast to 200 nautical miles (370.4 km) into the Pacific Ocean.

== Name ==
This maritime domain was officially named on May 24, 1984, in honor of Miguel Grau Seminario, a Peruvian military officer and national hero in Peru and Bolivia for his actions during the War of the Pacific. During the war, Grau led the defense of the Peruvian and Bolivian coasts by holding off the Chilean Navy for six consecutive months before dying at sea during the decisive Battle of Angamos.

== See also ==
- Chilean–Peruvian maritime dispute
- Humboldt Current
- Miguel Grau Seminario
- Pacific Ocean
- War of the Pacific

== Bibliography ==
- El Perú en los tiempos antiguos, Julio R. Villanueva Sotomayor, Empresa Periodística Nacional SAC, Lima, y Quebecor World Perú S.A. 2001.
- El Perú en los tiempos modernos, Julio R. Villanueva Sotomayor, Empresa Periodística Nacional SAC, Lima, y Quebecor World Perú S.A. 2002.
- Atlas del Perú, Juan Augusto Benavides Estrada, Editorial Escuela Nueva, Lima. 1995.
- Historia de la República del Perú [1822-1933], Jorge Basadre Grohmann, Orbis Ventures SAC, 1939, 2005, Lima. ISBN 9972-205-62-2.
- Benavides Estrada, Juan (1999). Geografía del Perú 2do año de Secundaria. Lima: Escuela Nueva.
