= Carlos Urrutia (Peruvian diplomat) =

Peruvian diplomat

Ambassador of Peru to Venezuela
- In office October 6, 2002 – May 22, 2006
- President: Alejandro Toledo
- Preceded by: Luis Marchand
- Succeeded by: Luis Santa María Calderón

Personal details
- Born: August 1, 1939 (age 87) Trujillo, Peru
- Party: Perú Posible
- Education: Pontifical Catholic University of Chile

Carlos Augusto Urrutia Boloña is a Peruvian diplomat who served as ambassador to Venezuela from 2002 to 2006, being twice recalled as a protest against Venezuela's alleged interference in the 2006 Peruvian national election by its support of candidate Ollanta Humala.
