= Ana Mariella Bacigalupo =

Peruvian anthropologist (born 1964)

- Occupations: Anthropologist; professor

Academic background
- Education: University of California, Los Angeles (Ph.D.)

Ana Mariella Bacigalupo is a Peruvian anthropologist. She is a full professor at the State University of New York at Buffalo and has previously taught throughout the USA and in Chile. Her research primarily focuses on the shamans or machis of the Mapuche community of Chile, and the ways shamanic practices and beliefs are affected by and influence communal experiences of state power, mythical history, ethics, gender, justice, and identity.

Bacigalupo's research encompasses a number of topics including shamanism, social and historical consciousness, environmental humanities, transformational politics, decolonizing methodologies, social and environmental justice, climate justice, cosmopolitics, the Anthropocene, more-than-humans, power dynamics in colonial politics, death, self and personhood, gender and sexuality, historicity, Indigenous histories, social memory, religion, and medical anthropology. She uses anthropological and social theories including new materialism, critical race theory, queer theory, and embodiment, and phenomenology. She primarily studies the Global South, Indigenous Latin America, the Mapuche people, Chile, and northern Peru.

Her recent research focuses on forms of power and the politics of the Indigenous views of sentient landscapes, spirits, and other ‘more-than-humans’. Using queer theory, feminist theory, critical race theory, and new materialism, Bacigalupo looks at collective ethics, environmental justice, and social justice in the Anthropocene, and how colonial histories have both influenced and been contradicted by Indigenous knowledge. She studies interactions between shamans and more-than-humans, and how these practices can change the structures of power by critiquing colonial perspectives about the organization of nature and the world. One of her arguments is that shamans offer a useful perspective for conceiving of new ideas for the future and critique for the status quo. Many of these shamans are public figures in Indigenous communities, where they are intellectuals who can influence the political landscape.

At the State University of New York at Buffalo, Bacigalupo is the chair of the Religion and Spirituality section of the Latin American Studies Association. She also serves as the Program Councilor for the Society for Latin American and Caribbean Anthropology.

== Education and career ==
Ana Mariella Bacigalupo obtained her PhD from the University of California, Los Angeles (UCLA) for Anthropology. The Mapuche communities have been her focus of study, observing their lifestyles from the perspective and guidance of her 'spiritual grandmother,' Francisca Kolipi, a Mapuche Shaman. Her major works regarding the Mapuche have been published since 1996 with the most notable being Shamans of the Foye Tree: Gender, Power and Healing Among Chilean Mapuche and Thunder Shaman: Making History With Mapuche Spirits in Chile and Patagonia, both published respectively in 2007 and 2017.

Over more than twenty-five years, Bacigalupo has carried out ethnographic and archival work with indigenous Mapuche shamans of southern Chile and Argentina, and has been working with curanderos in Northern Peru since 2016. That work has been focused on cultural transformation, as well as systems of knowledge and power, from the perspective of these shamans and their communities. This includes her publications, which have focused on the operation of narrative, subject formation, agency, and power within different spiritual-political economies, gendered paradigms, historicities, ecologies, cosmologies, and healing systems. Bacigalupo is particularly interested in how, in colonial and postcolonial contexts, philosophies of power and knowledge produce disparate subjects and modes of action, historical narratives and imaginaries, notions of illness and death, techniques of the body, and therapeutic ritual forms. Bacigalupo has now expanded her work to the coast and Andean valleys in Northern Peru where she analyzes the intersection of sacred, animated spaces, environmental justice and collective ethics.

Bacigalupo has published five books and more than sixty sole authored articles and chapters. Her sole authored books include Thunder Shaman: Making History with Mapuche Spirits in Patagonia (2016); Shamans of the Foye Tree: Gender, Power and Healing Among Chilean Mapuche (2007); The Voice of the Drum in Modernity: Discourses of Tradition and Change in the Practice of Seven Mapuche Shamans (2001); Hybridity in Mapuche Healing: The Practice of Contemporary Shamans (1996). She also co-authored Modernization and Wisdom in Mapuche Land (1995). Bacigalupo is completing a sixth book titled The Subversive Politics of Sentient Landscapes: Collective Ethnics and Environmental Justice in Northern Peru.

Bacigalupo also has provided service to the anthropology profession. She served as co-chair of the “Religion and Spiritualities” section of the Latin American Studies Association. She is Associate editor of the journal American Religion and served as board member of the Society for the Anthropology of Religion, the Society for Latin American and Caribbean Anthropology, and the Advisory Board for the Indigenous Religions section of the American Academy of Religion. She serves on the editorial board for several journals in anthropology in the US and abroad including Anthropology and Humanism; Journal of Latin American and Caribbean Anthropology; Magic, Ritual and Witchcraft; Revista Chilena de Antropología; Scripta Ethnologica; Argus-a Artes y Humanidades. She has served on the editorial boards for Identities: Global Studies in Culture and Power; Latino Cultural Studies; Cultural Citizenship: The New Centennial Review; and Acta Americana.

Awards received from the University at Buffalo include the Outstanding Young Investigator Award; the UB 2020 award for Excellence in Cultural, Historical and Literary/Textual Studies; the Milton Plesur Teaching Award; the Meyerson Award for Distinguished Teaching and Mentoring; The Humanities Institute Research Grant; the Faculty Internationalization Research Grant; the Gender Institute Faculty Research Award; the Civic Engagement Fellowship; the Community for Global Health Equity grant; the Research Grant from the Baldy Center for Law and Social Policy; and the OVPRED/HI Seed Money in the Arts and Humanities grant.

== Work about Mapuche Shamanism ==
=== Books ===
==== La voz del kultrun en la modernidad: Tradición y cambio en la terapéutica de siete machi Mapuche (The Voice of the Drum in Modernity: Tradition and Change in the Healing Therapies of Seven Mapuche Shamans) ====
In her book La voz del kultrun en la modernidad: Tradición y cambio en la terapéutica de siete machi Mapuche (The Voice of the Drum in Modernity: Tradition and Change in the Healing Therapies of Seven Mapuche Shamans [Ediciones Universidad Católica de Chile, 2001]), Bacigalupo argues that the discourses and holistic healing practices of Mapuche shamans are forms of historical and social analysis in their own right. Challenging the multicultural legacy of colonialism that has construed Mapuche shamans as remnants of an “authentic traditional past,” she demonstrates that their shamanic practices are complex hybrid formations that participate in the same history that produced other manifestations of modernity. Bacigalupo investigates the multivocal and multireferential concepts of tradition and modernity as they are negotiated in the complex relationships between Mapuche shamans and their patients. Mapuche shamans, called machi, treat “traditional” illnesses—such as soul loss and sorcery—alongside “modern” illnesses like stress, depression, lovesickness, alienation, economic problems, AIDS and cancer. Machi present themselves as “traditional,” Bacigalupo argues, in order to respond to the demands of their non-Mapuche patients, but they incorporate into their practices powers and symbols from biomedicine and Catholicism, among other traditions. This ambiguity enables machi to serve as savvy cultural mediators who respond to the traumatic legacy of colonialism and the postcolonial present in ways that serve the moral imagination of the community.

===== Reviews =====
La voz del kultrun en la modernidad: Tradición y cambio en la terapéutica de siete machi Mapuche was reviewed in a number of journals, including:

Publication	Author
American Academy of Religion	Sylvia Marcos
American Anthropologist	Michael Winkelman
Journal of Latin American Studies	Florencia E. Mallon
Social Science and Medicine	Michael Winkelman
Tipiti: Journal of the Society for the Anthropology of Lowland South America	Marcelo Fiorini

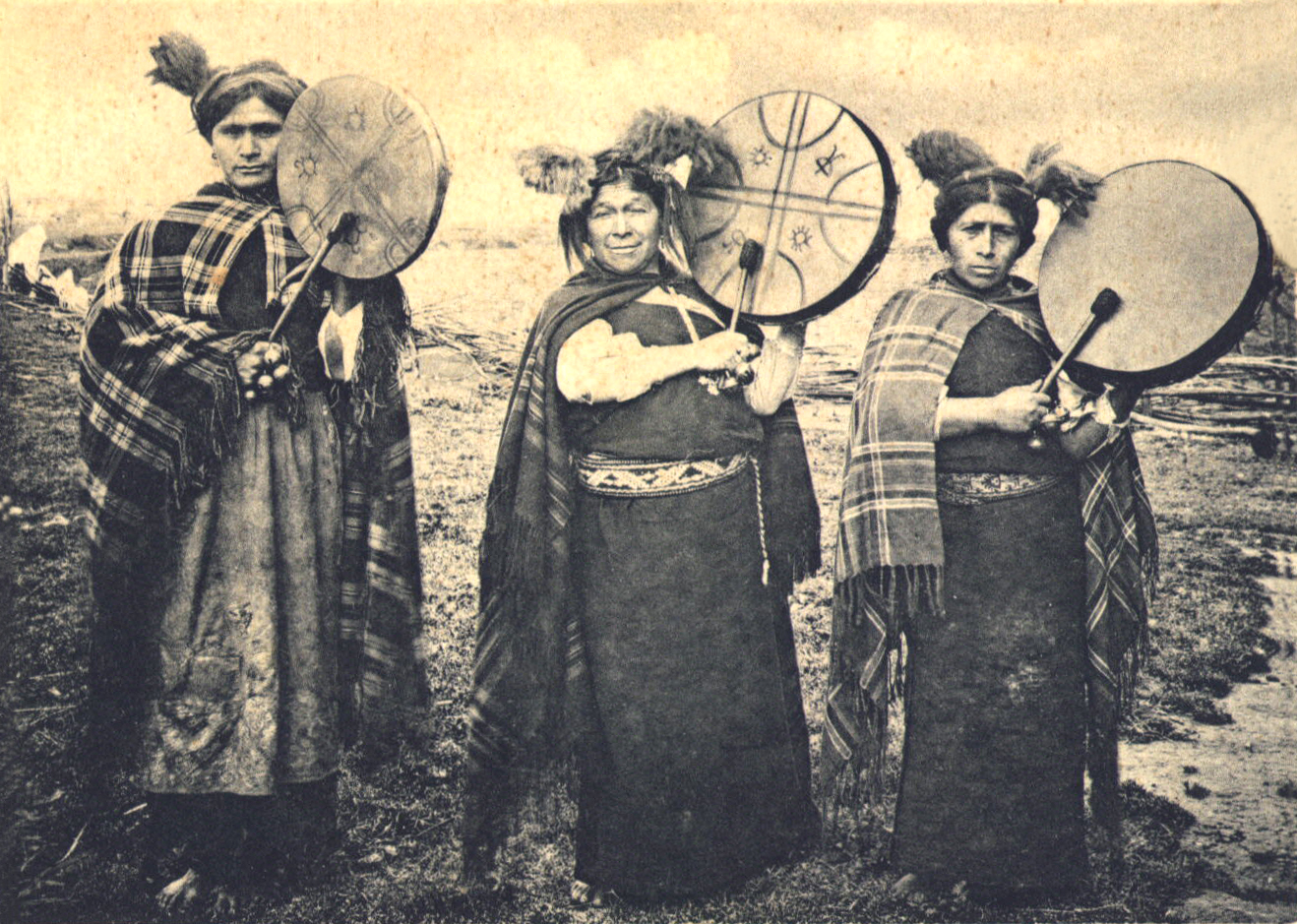
Mapuche machis

==== Shamans of the Foye Tree: Gender, Power, And Healing Among Chilean Mapuche ====
Bacigalupo's book Shamans of the Foye Tree: Gender, Power, and Healing among the Chilean Mapuche (University of Texas Press, 2007), comprises nine chapters that analyze the contested cultural politics of gender in the lives and practices of female and male transvestite and co-gendered machi. These shamans variously reproduce, challenge, and transform three paradigms of gender behavior that are at once colonial and indigenous: the male-female binary based on biological claims; the sexual-penetration paradigm of penetrating men and receptive non-men; and the ritual performances of masculinity, femininity, and co-gendered identities. Bacigalupo argues that discourses that polarize gender identities and fix gender referents in Chile also enable machi to move between male/female dichotomies, collapsing or fusing them through ritual practice. Shamans use paradoxical discourses about gender to legitimate themselves as gender-shifting ritual healers and as modern men and women.

Bacigalupo argues that, together with their relation to spirits, the machi's performances of gender enact power, hierarchy, and healing, making their bodies conflictual sites that express identities and differences between Mapuche and non-Mapuche people. Perceptions of “sexual deviance” and “sorcery” engender change because they are linked to fractures in a community that develop when people take up different positions in relation to capitalist ideologies. Bacigalupo analyzes the relation of shamans’ bodies to the body politic, tracing how the increasing shamanization of indigenous politics contributes to current discussions of identity, resistance, and agency—as well as to the structure and practice of power itself. In a separate article, published in American Ethnologist (2004), Bacigalupo identifies the challenge posed by Mapuche shamans to conventional notions of transvestism, transgenderism, and homosexuality.

Shamans of the Foye Tree focuses on the shamans and discusses the importance of the foye tree and specifically discusses about gender. Mapuche shamans or machi are greatly influenced by sacred trees called Foye trees. Foye trees are a “symbol of office for both male and female machi and the place where the machi's spirit resides”. So machis could be seen as a community of people who don't only communicate with humans but also want to be able to communicate with other aspects of the universe(spiritual, natural and human) by means of the Foye trees.

Foye trees also emphasize that machi rituals are co-gendered because the flowers are specifically hermaphroditic. Hence Mapuche Shamans have no gender restrictions in order to engage in the rituals. Most of the machi's are female because women usually provide fertility to the land which helps promote agriculture and ultimately helps the community survive.

===== Reviews =====
Shamans of the Foye Tree: Gender, Power, And Healing Among Chilean Mapuche was reviewed in a number of journals, including:

Publication	Author
	Magnus Course
AAA Section for Feminist Anthropology	Jennifer Hale-Gallardo
	Joanna Crow
Anthropologica	Rita Isabel Henderson
Tipiti: Journal of the Society for the Anthropology of Lowland South America, Latin American and Caribbean Ethnic Studies	Hyejin Nah
Journal of Latin American Studies	Anne Lavanchy
Journal des Americanistes	Sabine Kradolfer
Paideuma: Mitteilungen zur Kulturkunde	Lioba Rossbach de Olmos
Chungara, Revista de Antropología Chilena	Tom D. Dillehay

==== Thunder Shaman: Making History With Mapuche Spirits In Chile And Patagonia ====
Bacigalupo's book Thunder Shaman: Making History with Mapuche Spirits in Patagonia examines the controversial life of Francisca Kolipi, as well as the rebirth of her memory in a community that had attempted to forget her after her death. Bacigalupo argues that Mapuche shamanic biographical narratives challenge conventional Chilean history by expressing their past in terms of shamanic historical understandings. In these narratives, the Mapuche fuse cyclical stories of creation, transformation, and destruction with the linear, chronological narratives of the recent past that produce a sort of history that Westerners find familiar. In mythologizing historical shamans, the biographies also rehistoricize and politicize myths in new contexts. Francisca and her community were constituted by the historical events of their lives, yet they also reconstituted those events through shamanic temporalities. By prioritizing the agency of spirits and shamans who can be reborn, these biographies reverse the Mapuche's subordination to the Chilean state, presenting them as the spiritual victors of history. The Mapuche thereby use shamanic biographical narratives to convey their own native historical agency and to promote political mobilization based on the transformative capacities of their spiritual power.

In this book, Bacigalupo argues that Mapuche engage in the subversive use of archival documents, maps and bibles, transforming them into an objects of power to subvert the dynamics of oppression between Mapuche and forces of colonialism. She argues that these non-Mapuche textual objects, have come to play a central role in the constitution of indigenous Mapuche shamanic identity, history, and power. Bacigalupo examines how and why Francisca, a non-literate Catholic Mapuche shaman, performs rituals using the community's land title and map to try and restore lands usurped by colonizers, and how she cleanses her patient's illness using Catholic bibles. Bacigalupo also analyzes why Francisca charged Bacigalupo to write ethnography about her in the form of a “bible.” Francisca saw this “bible” as a way to store her shamanic power as text, allowing her to speak to an audience in the distant future. When smoked and chanted over, the powers that the “bible” stored could be extracted, transformed, circulated, and actualized for a variety of ends, including shamanic rebirth. Like other Mapuche shamans in southern Chile, Francisca used a multitude of sacred “bibles” as vehicles for memory, and for blending different streams of sacred knowledge with the temporalities of death and rebirth. Francisca used this non-Mapuche sacred object to produce indigenous history, and in doing so, she and other shamans challenge academics to expand our notions of indigenous literacy.

===== Reviews =====
Thunder Shaman: Making History With Mapuche Spirits In Chile And Patagonia was reviewed in a number of journals, including:

Publication	Author
Tipiti	Robin M. Wright
Chungara	Rodrigo Moulian Tesmer
Canadian Journal of Latin American and Caribbean Studies	Patrick C. Wilson
Reading Religion	Matthew Peter Casey
The Journal of Religion	Rachel Carbonara
Shaman	Evgenia Fotiou
Journal of the Royal Anthropological Institute	César E. Giraldo Herrera
Magic, Ritual, and Witchcraft	Stefan Ray Sanchez
	Diana Riboli

== The effects of state violence on Mapuche spiritualism ==
Bacigalupo explores the intersection of Chilean state violence upon indigenous Mapuche, the emergence of spirit cults around deceased Mapuche victims, and localized history-making and ethnic politics. She analyzes the Mapuche belief that the spirits of victims are partially perceptible beings trapped between life and death in the specific places where their bodies were killed. While memory studies and national commemoration focus on pastness and the celebration of individual martyrs, the undead represent the collective trauma of all Mapuche killed at different times in one place. They are agents who create an alternative localized history, not simply remembering suffering but acting upon past events to reshape them in the present. Bacigalupo shows how the undead play central roles in local cosmopolitics—combining spiritual, ecological, social, and political factors with realpolitik to counter state violence, seek revenge, subvert state projects, and demand justice. Alternatively, she shows how Mapuche conceive of the undead as heroes who sacrificed themselves for the benefit of the community and who seek avenues for healing and interethnic dialogue—thereby enabling a better future.

== Law, morality, and human rights in the context of 'shamanic notions of justice' and Chilean Catholic and LGBT families ==
As a research fellow at the Baldy Center for Law and Social Policy at the University at Buffalo for 2016–2017, Bacigalupo analyzes how in her LGBT custody case, Judge Karen Atala of Chile drew on the discourse of international human rights as well as the power obtained from a shamanic vision to challenge the Catholic moral criteria used by the Chilean Supreme Court to deny her custody of her children because of her lesbian sexuality.

In her LGBT custody case, Atala appealed publicly to an international human rights court with authority over the Chilean state. For Judge Atala, shamanic justice became a sexual and ethnic minorities subject to violence and discrimination by the Chilean state and the Catholic Church.

As part of this project, Bacigalupo analyzes the parallels between Mapuche co-gender shamans and the judges in the Inter-American court: charismatic figures who use persuasion, morality and their professional status in the pursuit of justice. Both shamans and human rights judges are fluid mediators positioned within and between multiple spiritual, legal and social worlds. They draw on this broad context to produce notions of justice that seek to produce balance in human society. Karen Atala's case offers new insights into the connections and tension between shamanic justice, LGBT identities, and international human rights and broadens our understanding of law. The case demonstrates important parallels between shamanic practices of justice and those of international human rights law and thus helps to illuminate both.

== Sentient landscapes, the effects of environmental damage and climate change on vulnerable populations, and political action in Peru ==
Bacigalupo analyzes how marginalized poor mestizos in Northern Peru respond to political corruption, climate change, and environmental devastation by engaging Indigenous sentient landscapes as leaders of environmental movements and cocreators of an interethnic world. They challenge social models of neoliberal capitalism and settler colonialism, which are based on the distinction between the human and nonhuman and promote human exceptionalism. Scholars have considered radically different forms of nonhuman persons and their ways of being in the world. By working beyond the theoretical limitations of ontological approaches (ways of being) and political ecology, and within the realm of a local, place-based environmental and spiritual politics, Bacigalupo shows how the historical dichotomies of Western thought and their effects can be disrupted. Bacigalupo analyzes how norteños’ engagement with sentient landscapes provides a model for radical moral-environmental-political action, in which “community” and “well-being” are defined as humans in relationship to place-as-persons and “nature” is resignified as an anchor for social justice.

== Minority Health and Health Disparities International Research Training ==
Bacigalupo is involved in the National Institutes of Health Minority Health International Research Training (MHIRT) program in Northern Peru, a National Institutes of Health project, in collaboration with Douglas Sharon (Anthropologist, UC Berkeley, UB); Gail Willsky (Biochemist, UB), Rainer Bussmann (Missouri Botanical Gardens); and Linda Kahn (Medical Anthropologist, UB School of Medicine). The project focuses on evaluating the efficacy of medicinal plants used to treat infectious disease by curanderos (healers) on the north coast of Peru. There, she has worked with Sharon and Kahn to create a field school in medical anthropology in Trujillo. Beginning in summer 2015, they conducted ethnographic research into several aspects of traditional medicine, to include: the cultural meanings and uses of medicinal herbs and herbal mixtures; collaborations between practitioners of modern medicine and traditional healers in the fields of phytotherapy, ethnobotany, pharmacy and psychology; differences in how patients access and navigate traditional and biomedical health care systems; and the impacts of traditional medicine and ethnobotany on the improvement of health care in Trujillo.

== Fellowships, Grants, & Awards ==
Bacigalupo received funding for her works involving Mapuche shamanism from the International Federation for University Women, Fundación Andes, Fundación Conycit, the Center for the Study of World Religions at Harvard University, the Women's Studies in Religion Program at Harvard University, the Radcliffe Institute for Advanced Study at Harvard University, the Max Planck Institute, the National Humanities Center (Rockefeller Foundation and National Endowment for the Humanities), the Rutgers Center for Historical Analysis Senior Fellowship (declined), the School of Advanced Research in Santa Fe, the John Simon Guggenheim Foundation, the Rockefeller Bellagio Center, the Rockefeller Foundation, and the Women's Studies in Religion Program at Harvard University's Divinity School. The work's importance was also recognized by the University at Buffalo, in awarding Bacigalupo the Humanities Institute Faculty Research Fellowship, the UB 2020 Scholars Grant for Excellence in Cultural, Historical, and Literary/Textual Studies, and the Gender Institute Faculty Research Award.

Bacigalupo received funding for her work concerning the effects of state violence on Mapuche spiritualism from the Max Planck Institute for the study of Religious and Ethnic Diversity. She received funding for her work on human rights and ‘shamanic notions of justice’ from the SUNY Buffalo Baldy Center for Law and Social Policy, and from the SUNY Buffalo Civic Engagement Fellowship and the Arts and Humanities fund. She has also received funding from the Wenner-Gren Foundation, the Stanford Humanities Center, the Netherlands Institute for Advanced Study, and the SUNY Buffalo Community for Global Health Equity for her work regarding sentient landscapes and more-than-humans. For the Minority Health and Health Disparities International Research Training, she received a Faculty Internationalization Grant from SUNY Buffalo.

== Selected publications ==
- 1995 “Renouncing Shamanistic Practice: The Conflict of Individual and Culture Experienced by a Mapuche Machi.” Anthropology of Consciousness 6 (3): 1–16.
- 1996 “Mapuche Women's Empowerment as Shaman/Healers.” Annual Review of Women in World Religions 4: 57–129.
- 1996 “Identidad, espacio y dualidad en los perimontun (visiones) de machi Mapuche” [Identity, space and duality in the visions of Mapuche shamans]. Scripta Ethnologica 18: 37–63.
- 1998 “The Exorcising Sounds of Warfare: Shamanic Healing and the Struggle to Remain Mapuche.” Anthropology of Consciousness 9 (5): 1–16.
- 1999 “Studying Mapuche Shaman/Healers from an Experiential Perspective: Ethical and Methodological Problems.” Anthropology of Consciousness 10 (2–3): 35–40.
- 2000 “Shamanism as Reflexive Discourse: Gender, Sexuality and Power in the Mapuche Religious Experience.” In Gender, Bodies, Religions, edited by Sylvia Marcos, 275–295. Cuernavaca: ALER. [Translated and published in 2006, Bedenler, dinler ve toplumsal cinsiyet, derleyen, by Sylvia Marcos. Ankara: UTOPYA Yayinevi.]
- 2001 “The Rise of the Mapuche Moon Priestess in Southern Chile.” Annual Review of Women in World Religions 6: 208–259.
- 2003 “Rethinking Identity and Feminism: Contributions of Mapuche Women and Machi from Southern Chile.” Hypatia 18 (2): 32–57.
- 2004 “Ritual Gendered Relationships: Kinship, Marriage, Mastery, and Machi Modes of Personhood.” Journal of Anthropological Research 60 (2): 203–229. Repr.,2010, Women and Indigenous Religions, edited by Sylvia Marcos, 2010, 145–176. Santa Barbara, CA: ABC- CLIO/Praeger Press
- 2004 “Shamans’ Pragmatic Gendered Negotiations with Mapuche Resistance Movements and Chilean Political Authorities.” Identities: Global Studies in Culture and Power 11 (4): 501–541.
- 2004 “The Struggle for Machi Masculinities: Colonial Politics of Gender, Sexuality and Power in Chile.” Ethnohistory 51 (3): 489–533.
- 2005 “The Creation of a Mapuche Sorcerer: Sexual Ambivalence, the Commodification of Knowledge, and the Coveting of Wealth.” Journal of Anthropological Research 61 (3): 317–336.
- 2005 “Gendered Rituals for Cosmic Order: Mapuche Shamanic Struggles for Healing and Fertility.” Journal of Ritual Studies 19 (2): 53–69.
- 2008 “The Re-invention of Mapuche Male Shamans as Catholic Priests: Legitimizing Indigenous Co-gender Identities in Modern Chile.” In Native Christians: Modes and Effects of Christianity among Indigenous Peoples of the Americas, edited by Robin Wright and Aparecida Vilaca, 89–108. Aldershot: Ashgate Press.
- 2010 “The Life, Death, and Rebirth of a Mapuche Shaman: Remembering, Forgetting and the Willful Transformation of Memory.” Journal of Anthropological Research 66 (1): 97–119.
- 2014 “The Potency of Indigenous Bibles and Biography: Mapuche Shamanic Literacy and Historical Consciousness.” American Ethnologist 41 (4): 648–663.
- 2016 “The Paradox of Disremembering the Dead: Ritual, Memory, and Embodied Historicity in Mapuche Shamanic Personhood.” Anthropology and Humanism 41 (2):139-157.
- 2017 “The Life, Death, and Rebirth of a Mapuche Shaman: Remembering, Disremembering, and the Willful Transformation of Memory “ In Death, Mourning and Burial: A Cross-Cultural Reader, Second Edition edited by Antonius C.G.M. Robben, 276-292. Wiley-Blackwell.
- 2018 “Shamanic Rebirth and the Paradox of Disremembering the Dead Among Mapuche in Chile” In A Companion to the Anthropology of Death, First Edition. Edited by Antonius C. G. M. Robben, 279-291. John Wiley & Sons, Inc.
- 2022 “Embodying, Reshaping, and Combining the Past and the Future: A Mapuche Shaman's Historical Agency in Chile.” In Spirit-based Traditions of the Americas, edited by Benjamin Hebblethwaite, University of Nebraska press.

== See also ==
- Mapuche religion
- Shamanism
