= Chinchorro culture =

Preceramic culture

Chinchorro
- Extent of Chinchorro archeological sites
- Geographical range: Atacama Desert
- Period: Preceramic
- Dates: c. 7000 - 1500 BCE
- Preceded by: Monte Verde
- Followed by: Wankarani

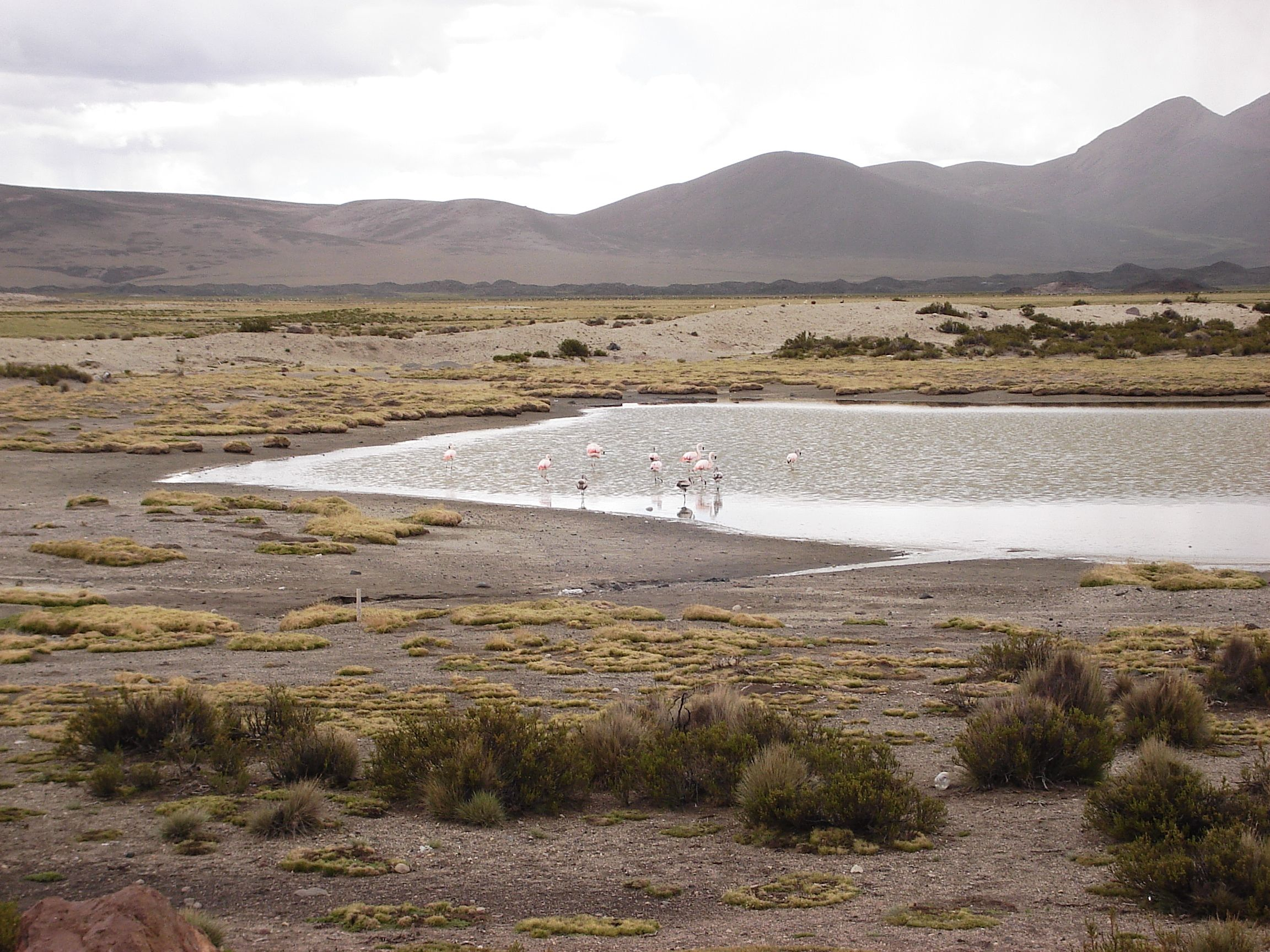
Landscape of Arica, Chile

The Chinchorro culture of South America was a preceramic culture that lasted from 9,100 to 3,500 years BP (7,000 to 1,500 BCE). The people forming the Chinchorro culture were sedentary fishermen inhabiting the Pacific coastal region of current northern Chile and southern Peru. Presence of fresh water in the arid region on the coast facilitated human settlement in this area. The Chinchorro were famous for their detailed mummification and funerary practices. The area of the Chinchorro culture started to receive influences from the Andean Plateau around 4,000 BP, which led to the adoption of agriculture. Much later, it came under the influence of the Tiwanaku Empire.

In 2021, the Chinchorro culture was included in the UNESCO World Heritage List.

== Etymology ==
The Chinchorro culture is named after Chinchorro Beach (Spanish: Playa Chinchorro), near Arica, Chile, where the first mummies were discovered.

== Geography ==
The culture was spread across the arid coastal regions of the Atacama Desert from Ilo, southern Peru, to Antofagasta in northern Chile. But the cultural core of the Chinchorro seems to be the Chilean Arica-Camarones region, which stretches between the coastal towns of Arica and Caleta Camarones to the south. There are many archaeological sites around Arica, and around Caleta Camarones.

== Description ==
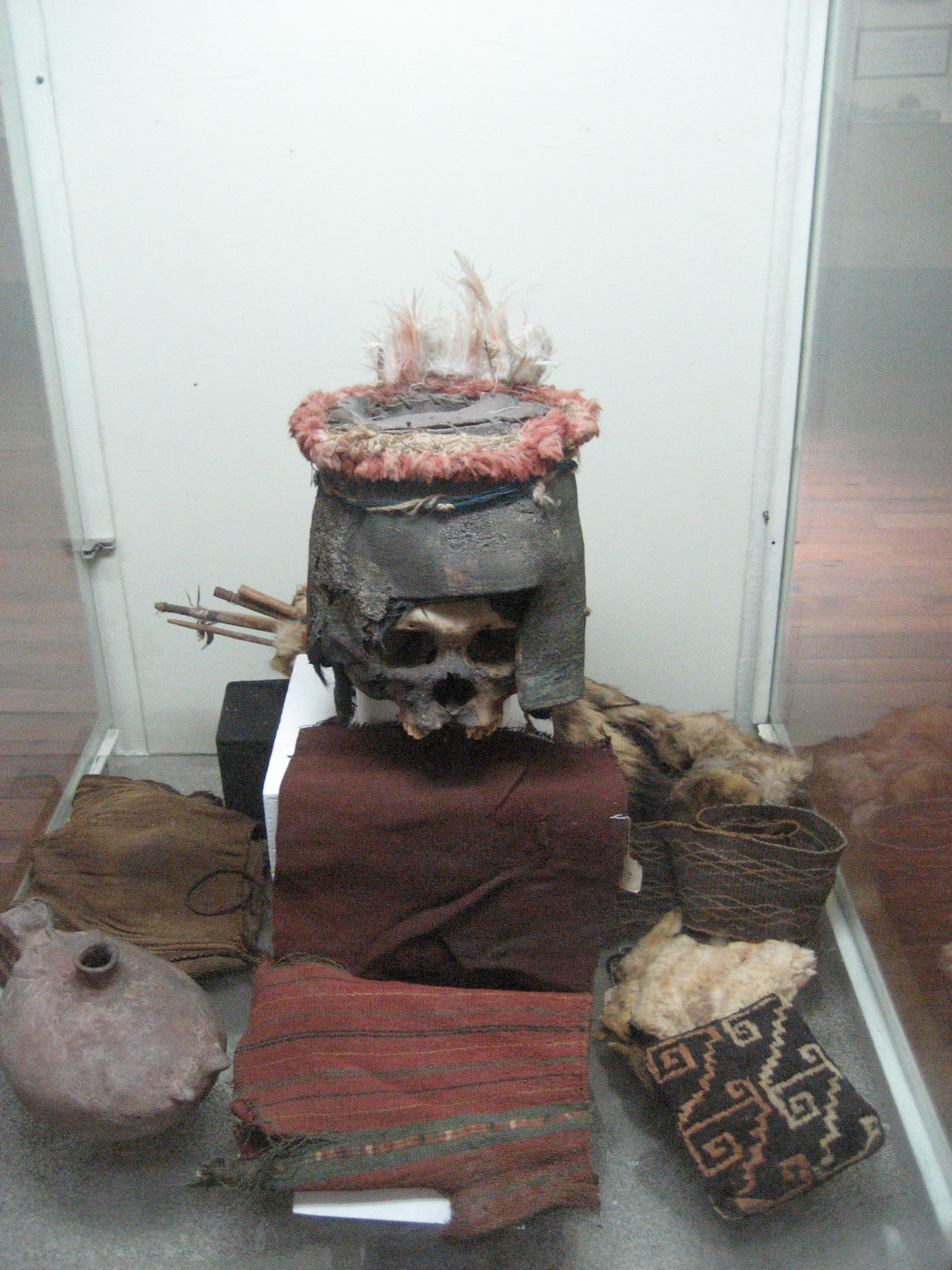
Chinchorro funeral rites of the later period (1000-500 BC)

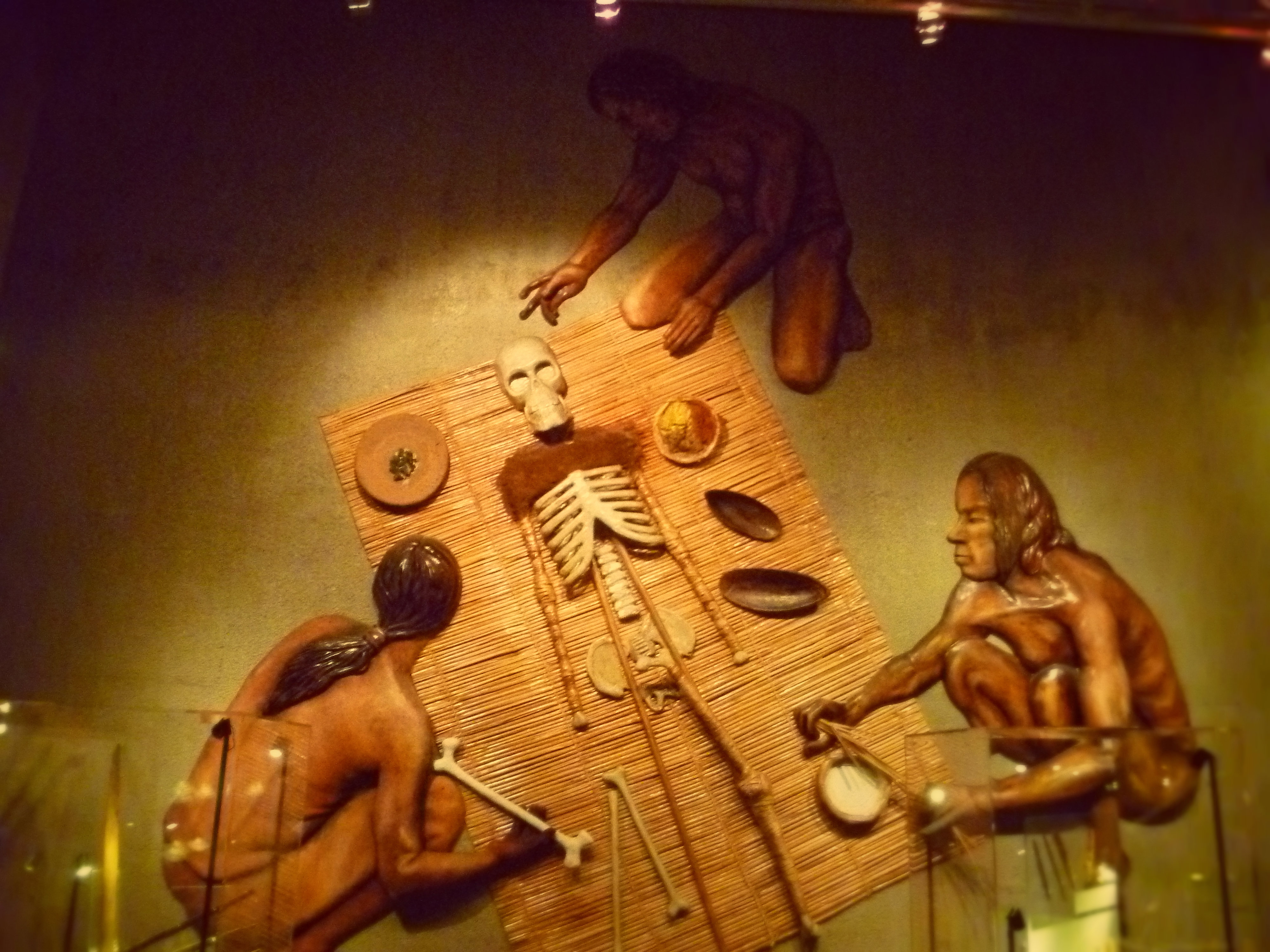
Artistic representation

The funeral rite is shown as a human skull with funeral helmet and various items, collection of the Anker Nielsen museum in Iquique, Chile. The mummification practice is displayed in the Archaeology Museum of San Miguel de Azapa.

The Chinchorro were expert fishermen. They developed an extensive and sophisticated fishing tool assemblage. The people had efficient fishing gear, such as fishing hooks made of shells and cactuses, and stone weights for nets made of mesh fabrics. They became skilled weavers of baskets and mats.

While most Chinchorro sites are located on the coast, some are also found inland and in the nearby highlands. Their lifestyle was predominantly supported by fish, shellfish and sea mammals. There are some large coastal middens that have been excavated. Analysis of the hair and human bones from the mummies indicates that about 90 percent of their diet consisted of maritime food and the remaining 10 percent of terrestrial animals and plants.

The Chinchorro type site is located in Arica, Chile; it was discovered by German archaeologist Max Uhle in the early 20th century.

Many very early archaeological sites have been discovered along this coast. In Peru, Quebrada Tacahuay and Quebrada Jaguay have been studied by archaeologists. Further south there are also the Ring site and the Quebrada Los Burros. These mostly date to late Pleistocene and early Holocene epochs (ca. 11,000–9000 BC). Inland in Chile there are also the sites of Achas and Las Conchas, Chile.

Quebrada Jaguay is the northernmost of these sites and also the oldest, dated to 11,000 BC. Quebrada Tacahuay, further south, is somewhat younger. Some scholars argue that Chinchorro culture developed from these earlier settlements although the details are still being investigated. The site of Achas is where the earliest Chinchorro mummy (the Acha man) has been found.

The well-known site of Monte Verde, which is also near the Chilean coastline, must also be mentioned in this context. Recently Monte Verde has been redated to as early as 18,500 BP (16,500 B.C.).

== Chinchorro mummies ==
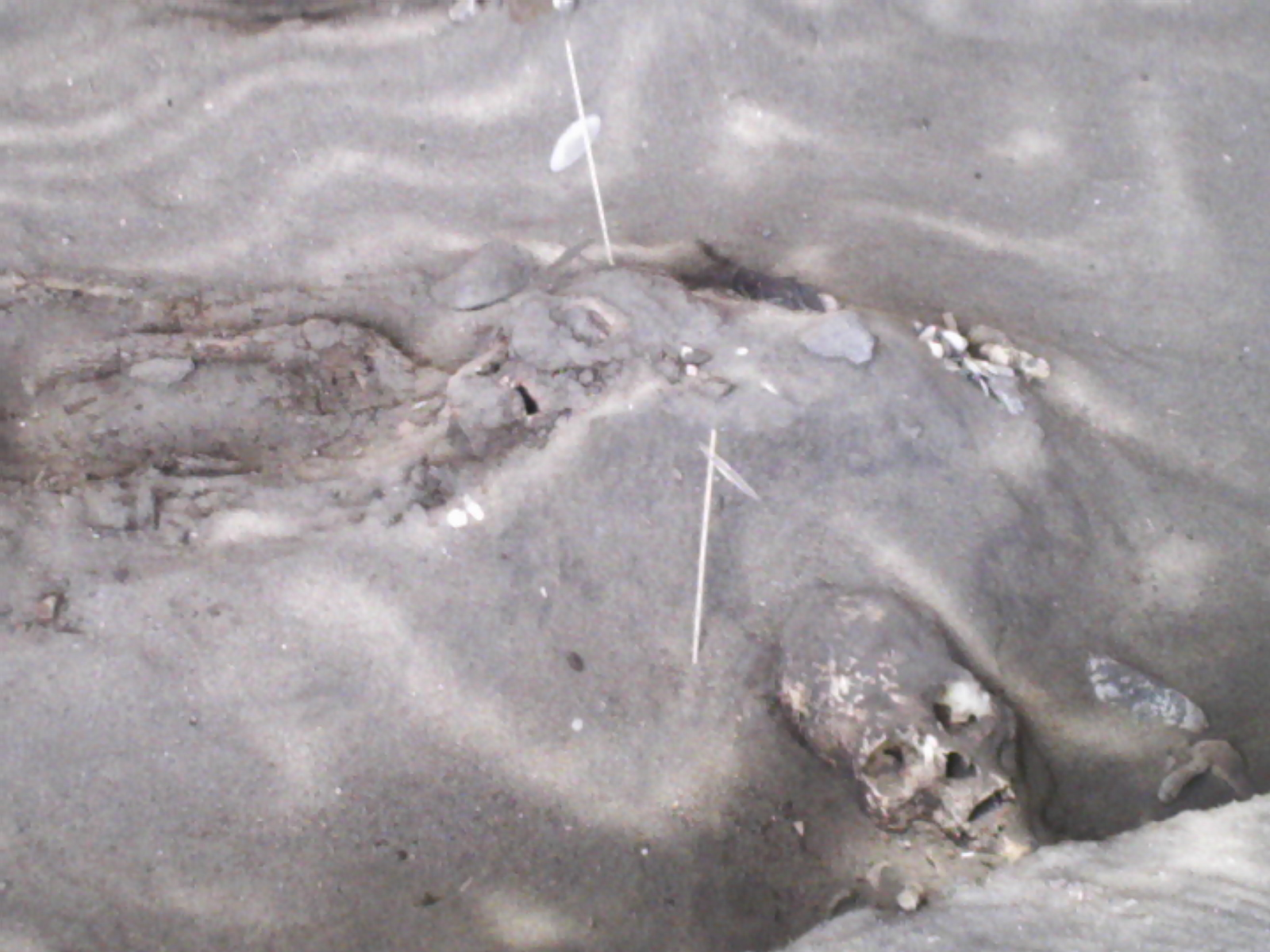
Chinchorro mummies of the type site in Arica, Chile

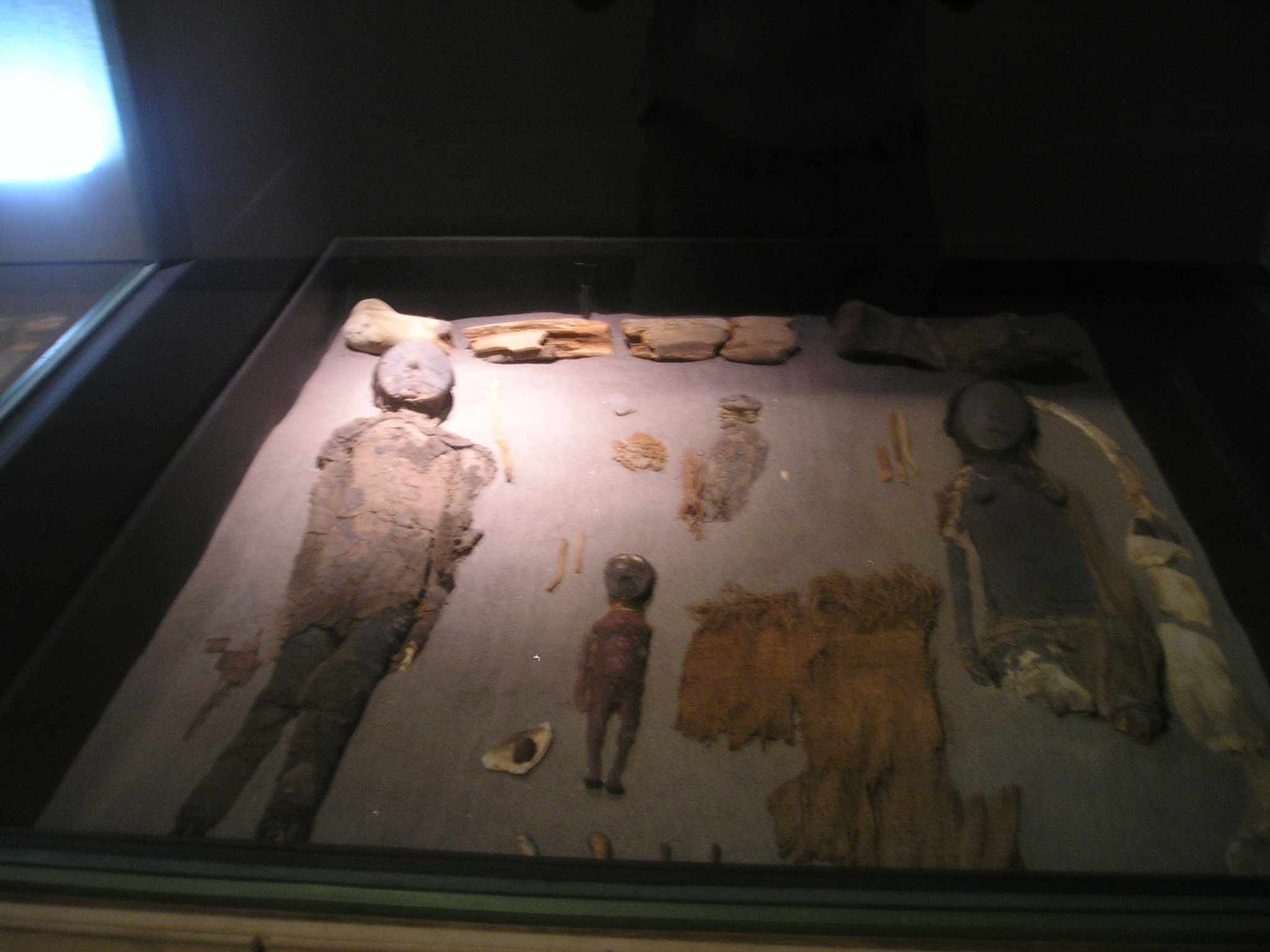
Chinchorro mummies at the museum in San Miguel de Azapa

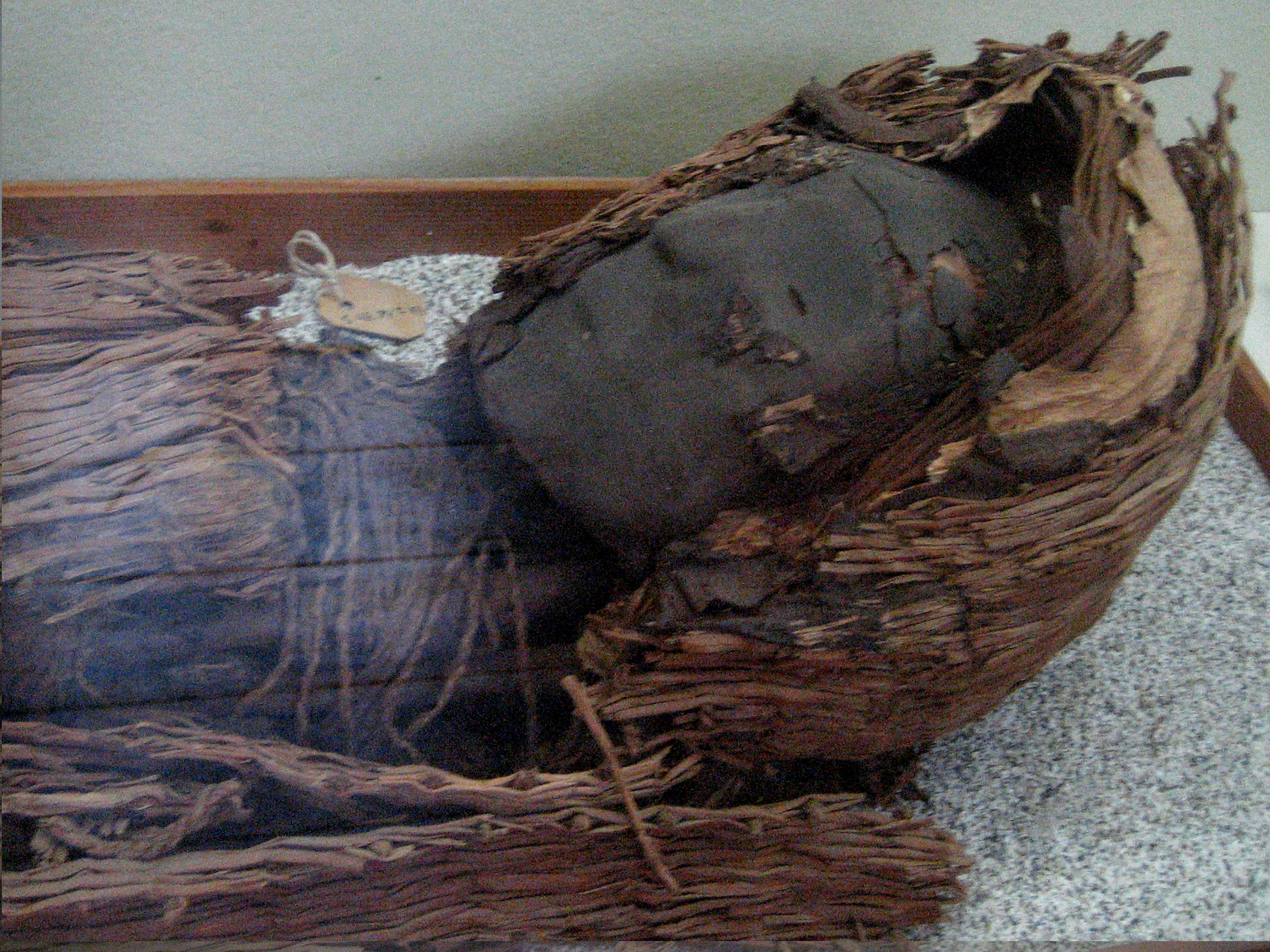
Head of a Chinchorro mummy

The Chinchorro mummies go back to 9,000 years Before Present, or 7,000 BC. The Chinchorro mummies were much older than those of the ancient Egyptians. Some of their DNA was recovered. The culture lasted for several thousand years, evolving and adapting over the period. The end of the Chinchorro culture is set around 3500 BP.

Dr. Bernardo Arriaza is a Chilean physical anthropologist who contributed much to our current knowledge about the Chinchorro. In 1984, he published a study in the journal Chungara, his first work on the Chinchorro culture. Later, in 1994, Arriaza published a classification of the Chinchorro mummies, the typology that today is widely used by the scientific and general community. In 1995 he wrote an important article for National Geographic Magazine on the Chinchorro mummies, which was translated into several languages helping to promote the ancient mummies at international level. His book "Beyond Death: The Chinchorro Mummies of Ancient Chile" was published by the Smithsonian Institution Press in Washington, D.C. This work was later translated into Spanish by Marlene Onate (University of Nevada, Las Vegas) and published in Chile by the Universidad de Chile together with the Editorial Universitaria Press.

The mummies are found to be mostly independent of the age and social status of the deceased, although higher-ranking former members of the Chinchorros underwent more elaborate and complex mortuary treatment. High arsenic concentrations in the environment led to high infant mortality among some of the people, which is discussed as the cause of the development of mummification as a social and emotional processing. The technique of mummification varied over time. In particular, the color of the mummies changed, from a shimmering black produced by manganese to a later (around 2000 BC) red color of the mummies.

After death, the flesh of the dead was removed and their exteriors were modeled using sticks and clay. The mummies were then embalmed with one of the above materials. Red and black face masks with characteristic holes for the mouth, nose and eyes were created by using color pigments and were presumably modeled after the faces of the deceased. The dead were then placed on cloths made of reeds and buried superficially in the desert soil.

== Early tattoo ==
A Chinchorro male mummy bears the earliest tattoo found in the Americas. He has a mustache-like dotted line tattooed above his upper lip; the tattoo dates to c. 2300 BC.

== Later developments ==
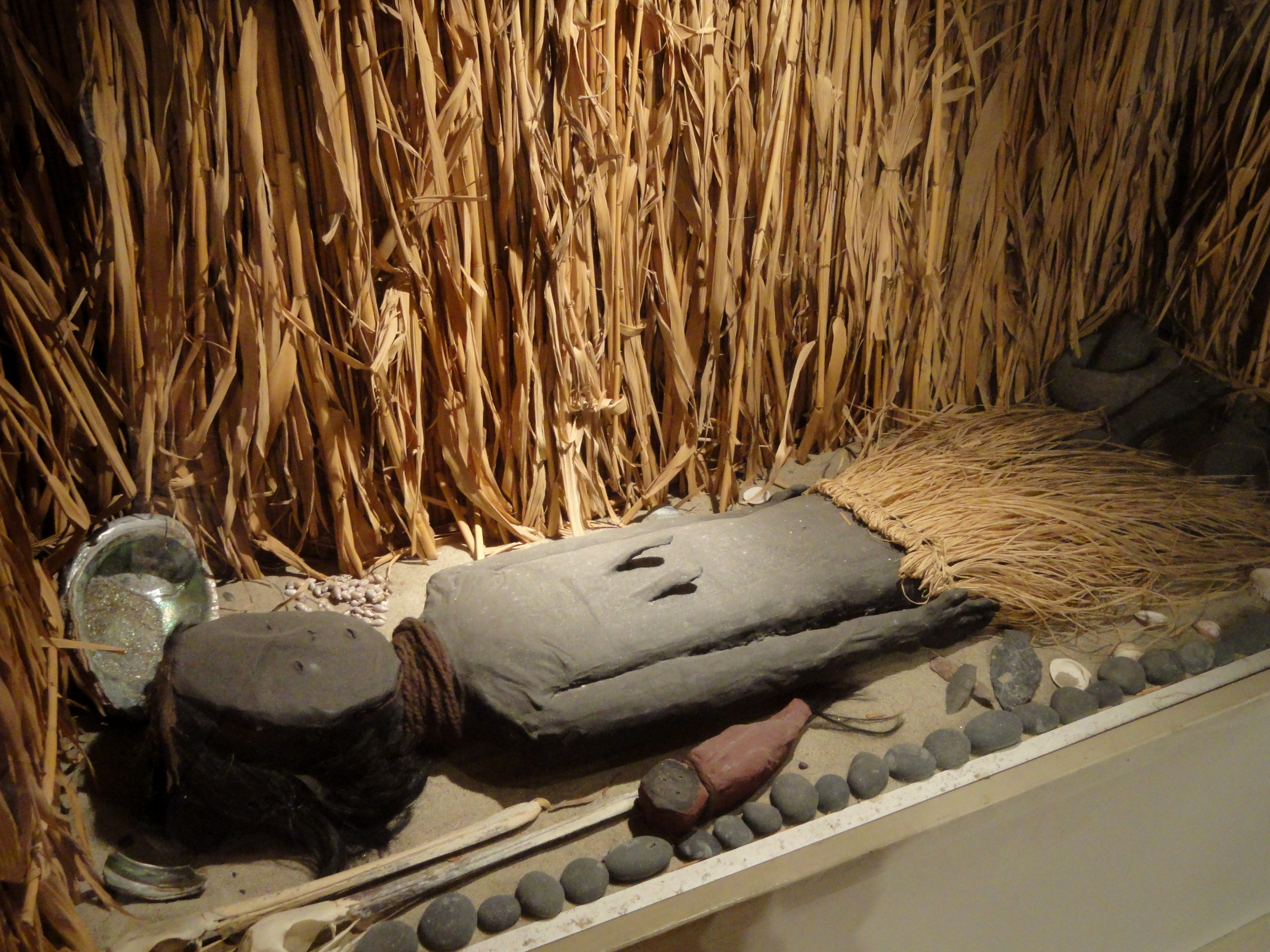
Chinchorro mummy, south coast of Peru or north coast of Chile, 5000-2000 BC - San Diego Museum of Man

The Azapa Phase of local cultural development (4,000-2,500 BP) was a transitional period between the end of the Chinchorro Phase and the start of the Alto Ramírez Phase. These developments took place in the Azapa Valley near the coast. Around 4,000 BP, the people of the Azapa Valley saw some cultural changes brought by immigrants from the Altiplano. These influences led to the adoption of agriculture c. 3,000 BP, as well as the introduction of ceramics. These later groups no longer mummified their dead.

The influence of the early Andean cultures in northern Chile has been studied by several archaeologists. Especially the influence from the Wankarani culture, and the early Pukara culture from the Lake Titicaca area may be relevant here. During a transitional phase, the Chinchorros may have coexisted with an emergent Andean Tradition along the coast.

== See also ==
- Coastal migration (Americas)
- Jon M. Erlandson
- Prehispanic history of Chile

== Bibliography and further reading ==
- Sanz, Nuria; Arriaza, Bernardo T.; Standen, Vivien G. (2014), The archaeology of the earliest human mummification – the Chinchorro culture: A Comparative Perspective (PDF) (PDF), UNESCO Office Mexico; Universidad de Tarapacá (Chile); National Monuments Council (Chile) Paris, UNESCO, pp. 1–202
- Arriaza, B.T.; Doubrava, M.; Standen, V.G.; Haas, H. (2005), "Differential mortuary treatment among the Andean Chinchorro fishers: Social inequalities or in situ cultural evolution", Curr Anthropol, 46: 662–671, doi:10.1086/432747
- Marquet, P.A.; Santoro, C.M.; Latorre, C.; Standen, V.G.; Abades, S.R.; Rivadeneira, M.M.; Arriaza, B.; Hochberg, M.E. (2012), "Emergence of social complexity among coastal hunter-gatherers in the Atacama desert of northern Chile", Proceedings of the National Academy of Sciences, 109 (37), Proceedings of the National Academy of Sciences Early Edition: 14754–14760, doi:10.1073/pnas.1116724109, hdl:10533/132929, PMC 3443180
- Standen, V.G. (2011), Violencia y cultura en cazadores, pescadores y recolectores Chinchorro de la costa del Desierto de Atacama (Norte de Chile) (8900-3700 años A.P.) – PhD dissertation, Universidad Nacional Autónoma de México, México, DF
- Standen, V.G.; Santoro, C.M. (2004), "Patrón funerario Arcaico temprano del sito Acha-3 y su relación con Chinchorro: cazadores, pescadores y recolectores de la costa norte de Chile – abstract in English", Lat Am Antiq, 15: 89–109, doi:10.2307/4141565, JSTOR 4141565
