= Susan Guettel Cole =

Academic background
- Education: University of Minnesota
- Thesis: (1975)

Academic work
- Discipline: Classics; Ancient Greek Religion
- Institutions: University of Illinois at Chicago; University at Buffalo
- Notable works: Landscapes, Gender, and Ritual Space: The Ancient Greek Experience (2004)

Susan Guettel Cole is Professor Emerita at the University at Buffalo in the Department of Classics. She is known for her work on Ancient Greek Religion and gender.

== Education ==
Cole received her PhD from the University of Minnesota in 1975. Her doctoral thesis was entitled The Samothracian Mysteries and the Samothracian Gods: Initiates, Theoroi, and Worshippers.

== Career ==
After graduating, she became Assistant Professor of Classics and Associate Professor of History at the University of Illinois at Chicago. In 1991 she was a Fellow of the Institute of Humanities at UIC. She published Theoi Megaloi: The Cult of the Great Gods at Samothrace, based on her doctoral dissertation, in 1986. Her second book, Landscapes, Gender, and Ritual Space: The Ancient Greek Experience, came out in 2004. She has also worked on pigs in Ancient Greek culture.

In 1992 she joined the Department of Classics at the University at Buffalo, where she was Chair of the department from 1994 to 1995 and again 1998–2004.

Cole was chair of the Society for Classical Studies Committee for Professional Ethics in 1986. She was Directeur d’Etudes Associé at the Ecole Pratique des Hautes Études in 1990. In 1996-97 she was a Fellow of the National Humanities Center. She has also received fellowships from the American Council of Learned Societies, the Alexander von Humboldt Foundation, and the David and Lucile Packard Foundation, and a grant from the Baldy Center for Law and Social Policy.

== Select publications ==
- 1980. "New Evidence for the Mysteries of Dionysos." Greek, Roman and Byzantine Studies 21.3: 223–238.
- 1981. "Could Greek women read and write?" Women's Studies, 8(1-2),
- 1984. "Greek Sanctions against Sexual Assault." Classical Philology, 79(2), 97–113.
- 1984. "The Social Function of Rituals of Maturation: The Koureion and the Arkteia." Zeitschrift Für Papyrologie Und Epigraphik, 55, 233–244.
- 1984. "Male and Female in Greek Cult." Zeitschrift Für Papyrologie Und Epigraphik, 55, 231.
- 1986. Theoi Megaloi: the cult of the great gods at Samothrace . Leiden: Brill. ISBN 9789004296473
- 2000. "Landscapes of Artemis." The Classical World 93.5 (2000): 471–81.
- 2004. Landscapes, Gender, and Ritual Space:The Ancient Greek Experience. Berkeley: University of California Press. ISBN 9780520235441
- 2008. "Ritual Texts for the Afterlife. Orpheus and the Bacchic Gold Tablets." The Journal of Hellenic Studies, 128, 221.
- 2010. "Maenads." in The Oxford Encyclopedia of Ancient Greece and Rome.
