= Azapa Valley =

Landform in Chile

Coordinates: 18°31′2″S 70°11′31″W

Azapa Valley is a fertile and narrow oasis in Arica y Parinacota Region, Chile. It is framed between two arid hills and divided by the San Jose River that runs during the summer season. It is located three kilometres (1.9 mi) from the city of Arica. This jewel of the north has a unique climate that permits the farming of a great variety of fruits and vegetables throughout the year. This is in addition to the unique Azapa olives, renowned for their violet color and bitter flavor that also yield a hearty oil.

== Areas of interest ==
=== Archaeology ===
Some of the world's oldest mummies from the Chinchorro culture are in the Museo Arqueológico San Miguel de Azapa in Arica. Many ruins of the Chiribaya culture (900 to 1400 CE) are in the Azapa Valley.

=== Parinacota ===
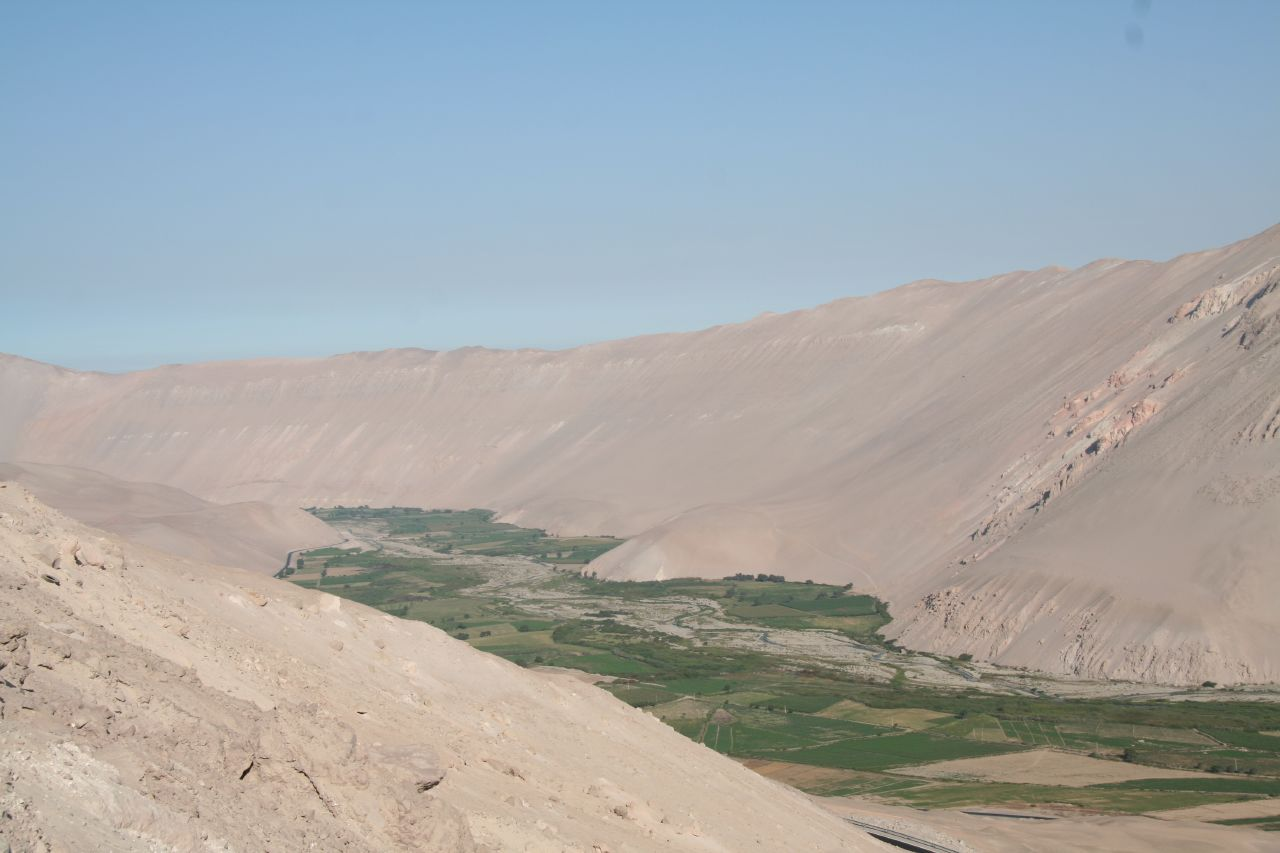
The Azapa Valley.

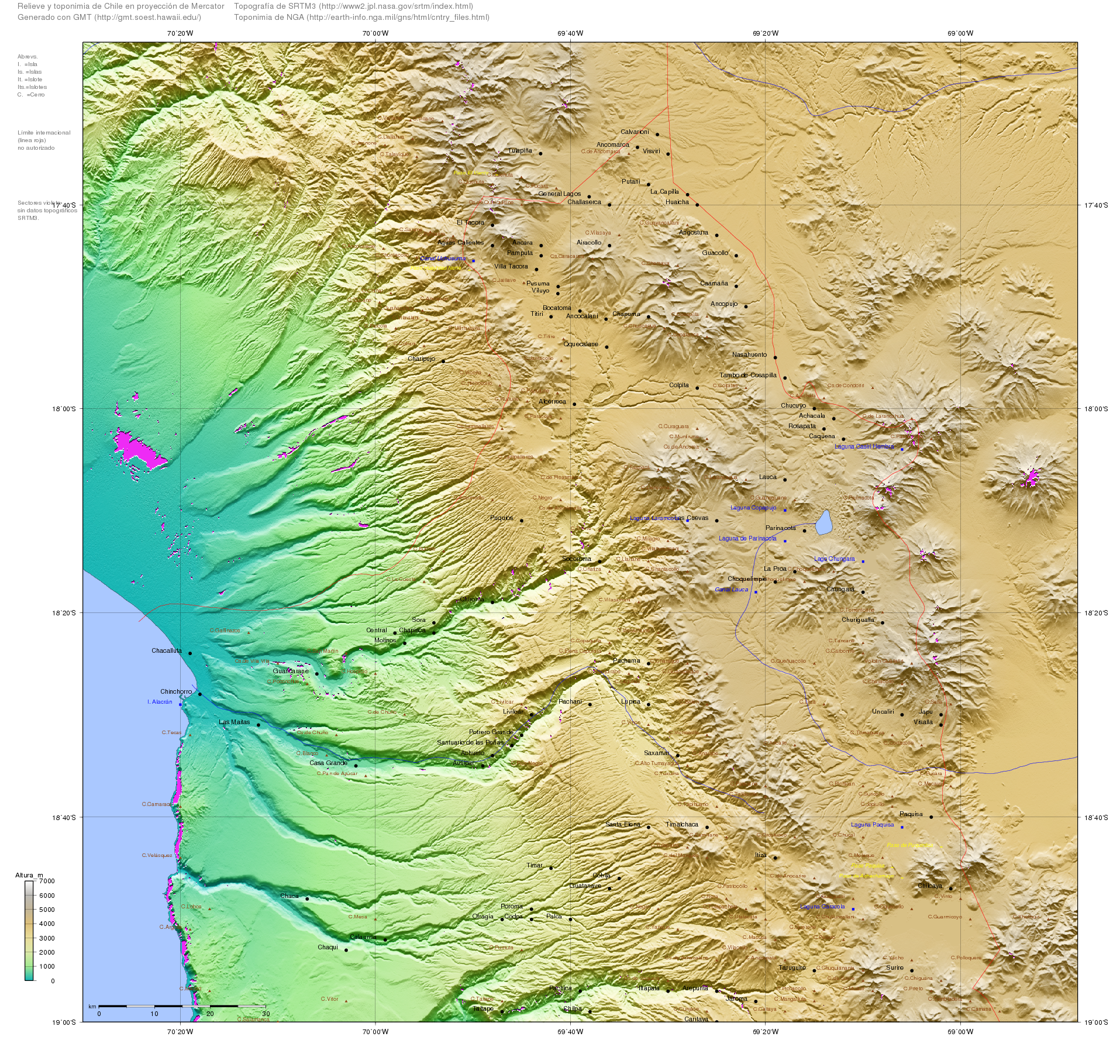
Topography of the Azapa Valley

One of Azapa's more interesting places is the Andean resort town of Parinacota, a town full of craftsmen. From Halles Street to passages around the Manuel Castillo Ibaceta roundhouse, one may find a diverse array of crafts available to tourists (and crafted on-site) of stone sculpture and wood, archaeological reproductions, ocarinas, archaeological ceramics from the north of Chile, designs on fabric, weavings, seaweed, utilitarian and decorative ceramics, as well as crafts and sculptures in metals.

The rest of the region offers other attractions, such as Chuño Hill, a place of many petroglyphs, and the Gorge of Acha, with its geoglyphs and their prehistoric camps.

=== Cerro Sombrero ===
Another location, the Cerro Sombrero (Hat Hill) boasts geoglyphs and a pre-Hispanic village perched on the side of the hill and made up of wood dwellings surmounting natural stone terraces. Historical studies have indicated that this establishment had as many as 500 houses between 1000 and 1400 A.D., a significant era of regional developments within Arica culture. The occupants of these constructs were agriculturists who maintained a substantial commercial exchange with Andean highland people. This commerce took place by means of llama caravans, which brought products of the highlands such as charqui, quínoa, wool, etc., down into the lowlands. This merchandise was traded for the products made by the populations of the low, coastal valleys: maize, red pepper, fish and seafood. Atoca, figures made of stone, represent a typical caravan of llamas with their guide, preceded by two dancers with anthropomorphous characteristics, and depict scenes of the caravan traffic that was carried out between coastal peoples and the peoples of the highlands.

Among sacred hills in the region of Pampas Alto Ramirez are impressive geoglyphs and other artifacts memorialize diverse settlements from the beginnings of agriculture to the present time. The panel of geoglyphs corresponds to the time of Inca regional influence and development (1,000 - 1,400 AD) and human and animal figures of the area: camelidaes, serpents, lizards, etc.

=== San Miguel de Azapa Knolls ===
Type of grave in the form of little hills (túmulos) through the successive accumulation of layers of sand and vegetal fiber litter.

=== Alto Ramirez ===
(400 belongs to the cultural phase a.C. - 400 d.C.)

=== San Miguel de Azapa ===
This town is located about 12 km (7.5 mi) from Arica and is surrounded by beautiful agricultural environs; it survives as a breeding ground of subtropical plants, túmulos and features the Archaeological Museum of San Miguel de Azapa, a museum associated with the Universidad de Tarapacá. This museum presents a complete vision of the cultural and anthropological development of the region for the past 10,000 years. Chinchorro mummies are exhibited in the museum. A visit here allows knowing some of the histories of this corner of the world.

=== Las Peñas of Livilcar Sanctuary ===
Located approximately 80 km (50 mi) from Arica, it is the scene of the celebration of the Virgin of the Rosary of Las Peñas (The Rocks), a celebration which happens between the first Sunday of October and December 8 of every year. (but in all honesty, we know nothing about them)
