= San Miguel de Azapa =

- Village
- Interactive map of San Miguel de Azapa
- Coordinates: 18°31′06″S 70°10′36″W
- Country: Chile
- Region: Arica and Parinacota Region

Population (2002)
  - Total: 2,067

San Miguel de Azapa is a village in the Arica and Parinacota Region, Chile.

== Points of Interest ==
The Museo Arqueológico Universidad de Tarapacá, San Miguel de Azapa (MASMA), or San Miguel de Azapa Archaeological Museum, stewards more than 20,000 objects and human remains, including Chinchorro mummies. The Chinchorro culture was included in the UNESCO World Heritage List in 2021.

== See also ==
- Chinchorro culture
