= Arriaza =

Arriaza is a surname. Notable people with the surname include:

- Adriana Salvatierra Arriaza (born 1989), Bolivian politician
- Bernardo Arriaza (born 1959), Chilean physical anthropologist
- Juan Bautista Arriaza (1770–1837), Spanish poet and writer
