= Diálogo Andino =

- Discipline: History, ethnohistory, cultural geography, ethnography
- Language: Spanish
- Edited by: Rodrigo Ruz Zagal

Publication details
- History: 1982–present
- Publisher: Departamento de Ciencias Históricas y Geográficas, University of Tarapacá (Chile)
- Frequency: Triannual

Standard abbreviations
- ISO 4: Diálogo Andino

Indexing
- ISSN: 0716-2278 (print); 0719-2681 (web)
- OCLC no.: 1022581631

Links
- Journal homepage; Online archive2

Diálogo Andino, subtitled Revista de Historia, Geografía y Cultura Andina, is a triannual peer-reviewed academic journal covering history, ethnohistory, cultural geography, and ethnography with particular, but not exclusive, focus on the Andean region. The journal was established in 1982 and is published by the Departamento de Ciencias Históricas y Geográficas of the University of Tarapacá. The editor-in-chief is Rodrigo Ruz Zagal (University of Tarapacá).

== Abstracting and indexing ==
The journal is abstracted and indexed in ERIH PLUS, Latindex, and Scopus.
