= Bernardo Arriaza =

Chilean physical anthropologist

Bernardo Arriaza is a Chilean physical anthropologist with an emphasis on bioarchaeology.

== Personal life ==
Bernardo Arriaza was born in 1959 in Coltauco, Rancagua, Chile. He studied at the U de Norte, and later obtained a Bachelor's degree in Physical Anthropology. As an undergraduate, he was employed as an assistant to Late paleo-pathologist Marvin Allison and that is when Arriaza first became interested in the Chinchorro Culture. He later obtained a Master's and then a Doctoral degree in Physical Anthropology from Arizona State University.

== Career ==
Arriaza has more than 70 papers in scientific journals; he is the author of 10 books on the first populations of northern Chile, some with collaborators, including five of a scientific nature, two on scientific dissemination and three specialized catalogs. Three of these have been republished. He participated in 14 book chapters; he also has 50 scientific presentations at national and international scientific meetings. Has participated as a researcher in eight projects funded by FONDECYT, four as a principal investigator, and four as a co-investigator. He has also participated in FONDART, NSF, FIC, and National Geographic Society grants, among others. He has been a scientific advisor on the Chinchorro Culture on 14 television documentaries including Discovery Channel and National Geographic.

In 1984 Arriaza wrote in the journal Chungara, his first work on the Chinchorro Culture in collaboration with other academics from the University of Tarapacá, ten years later, in 1994 he published in the Chungara a classification on the Chinchorro mummies, a typology that today is widely used by the scientific and general community. A year later, in 1995 he wrote an important article for National Geographic Magazine on the Chinchorro mummies, which was translated into several languages, including Japanese, French, and Portuguese. His work has helped to promote the Chinchorro mummies at the international level. The same year he wrote the book "Beyond Death: The Chinchorro Mummies of Ancient Chile". Smithsonian Institution Press. Washington, D.C. which was later translated, in 2003, into Spanish by Marlene Onate, Master of Art, University of Nevada Las Vegas, and published in Chile by the Universidad de Chile, prestigious Editorial Universitaria Press.

In 2002 with the collaboration of Vivien Standen, he wrote the book "Mummies, death and ancestral rites". University of Tarapacá. The work was published by the Editorial Universitaria Press in 2008. In 2005, he wrote his environmental hypothesis debating why the Chinchorro developed their artificial mummification practices. Four years later, in 2009 he published with Vivien Standen "Catalogue Chinchorro Mummies". University of Tarapacá Press. In 2014 Arriaza published with Nuria Sanz and Vivien Standen "The Chinchorro Culture: A comparative perspective". The archaeology of the earliest human mummification. UNESCO, in 2016 he published with Vivien Standen "Chinchorro Culture: Past and Present". University of Tarapaca Press (In press). In 2016, he was nominated for the Chilean National History Award. His last interviews were by the Chilean Magazine "Qué Pasa" and by the newspaper "Diario Uchile" but he's been consulted and cited since 1994

== Community involvement ==
Arriaza's involvement with the community began in 2005 with the project explore program: "Understand the desert so that we are players in the development of our region", an activity held in conjunction with Arica high schools. A year before, in 2004, he was involved in the creation of the website www.momiaschinchorro.com, subsequently transformed to chinchorro.cl (currently in redesign). In 2008, he was part of the publishing of the cartoon"Arqueonautas: The Chinchorro Vol. 1". Financed by GORE of Arica (distributed to schools), also in 2008 he participated as main scientific advisor in the documentary "Chinchorro: 3,000 years before King Tut" by Herman Mondaca Raitieri Danús and Andrés Vargas. In 2009, he won the FONDART grant on teaching materials on Chinchorro which was delivered to schools in the region of Arica and Parinacota.

== Awards ==
• 1999, Barrick Award Scholar Award from the University of Nevada, United States.

• 1999, Medal of Professional Merit by the Municipality of Arica.

• 2004, Lifetime Achievement Award from the Municipality of Coltauco, VI Region.

• 2013, Outstanding researcher, University of Tarapacá.

• 2015, Honor, declared "Ambassador of the Chinchorro Culture". Distinction awarded by the University of Tarapacá and the Municipality of Camarones.
