= Chinchorro mummies =

Prehistoric South American mummies

Settlement and Artificial Mummification of the Chinchorro Culture in the Arica and Parinacota Region
UNESCO World Heritage Site
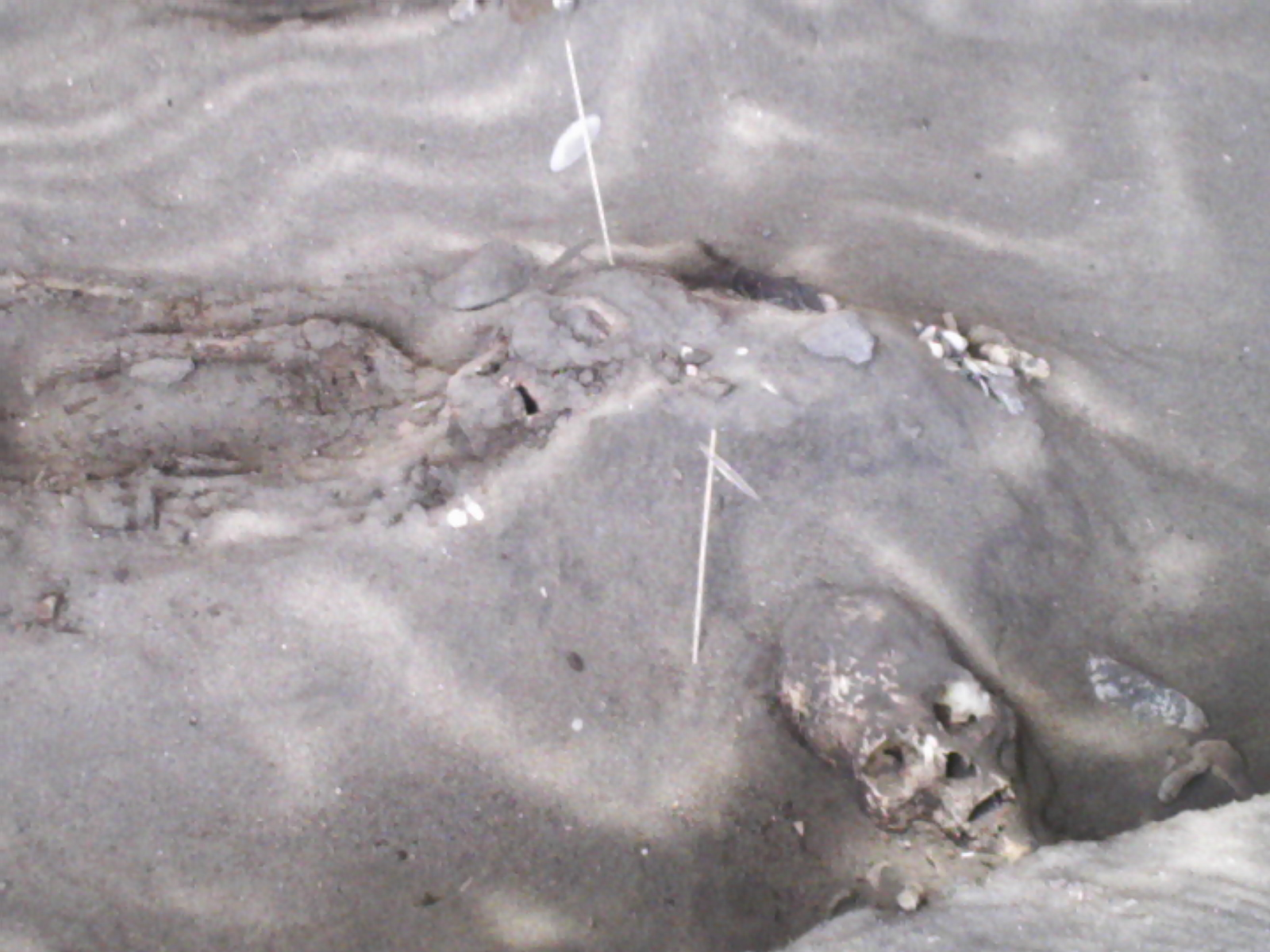
- Chinchorro mummies of the type site in Arica, Chile
- Interactive map of Settlement and Artificial Mummification of the Chinchorro Culture in the Arica and Parinacota Region
- Location: Chile
- Criteria: Cultural: (iii)(v)
- Reference: 1634
- Inscription: 2021 (44th Session)

The Chinchorro mummies are naturally and artificially preserved human remains associated with the Chinchorro culture, an Indigenous people who lived along the Pacific coast of what is now northern Chile and southern Peru. The oldest known naturally preserved Chinchorro individual dates to about 7020 BCE, while deliberate mummification began by about 5050 BCE, making the Chinchorro mummies the oldest known examples of purposefully preserved human bodies in the world.

The Chinchorro artificially preserved men, women and children from across their communities rather than restricting elaborate funerary treatment to a social elite. Their methods included reconstructing and reinforcing bodies, modelling them with clay, and adding wigs and mineral pigments. Several forms of mummification developed and overlapped during a tradition that continued for about 3,000 years, ending around 1800 BCE.

In 2021, settlements and cemeteries associated with the Chinchorro culture and its tradition of artificial mummification in Chile's Arica and Parinacota Region were designated a World Heritage Site by UNESCO.

== The Chinchorro culture ==
The Chinchorro were an Indigenous people who lived along the Pacific coast of what is now northern Chile and southern Peru between about 7000 and 1500 BCE, a period of more than 5,000 years. They established small communities near rivers that crossed the Atacama Desert and relied heavily on the sea for food. Shell middens and chemical analysis of human remains indicate that seafood accounted for about 90 percent of their diet.

Beginning around 5000 BCE, the Chinchorro developed the world's earliest known tradition of artificial mummification. Unlike many later societies, they preserved the bodies of men, women and children rather than reserving elaborate funerary treatment for a social elite. Over the next 3,000 years, their methods developed into several distinct forms before the practice ended around 1800 BCE.

== Discovery ==
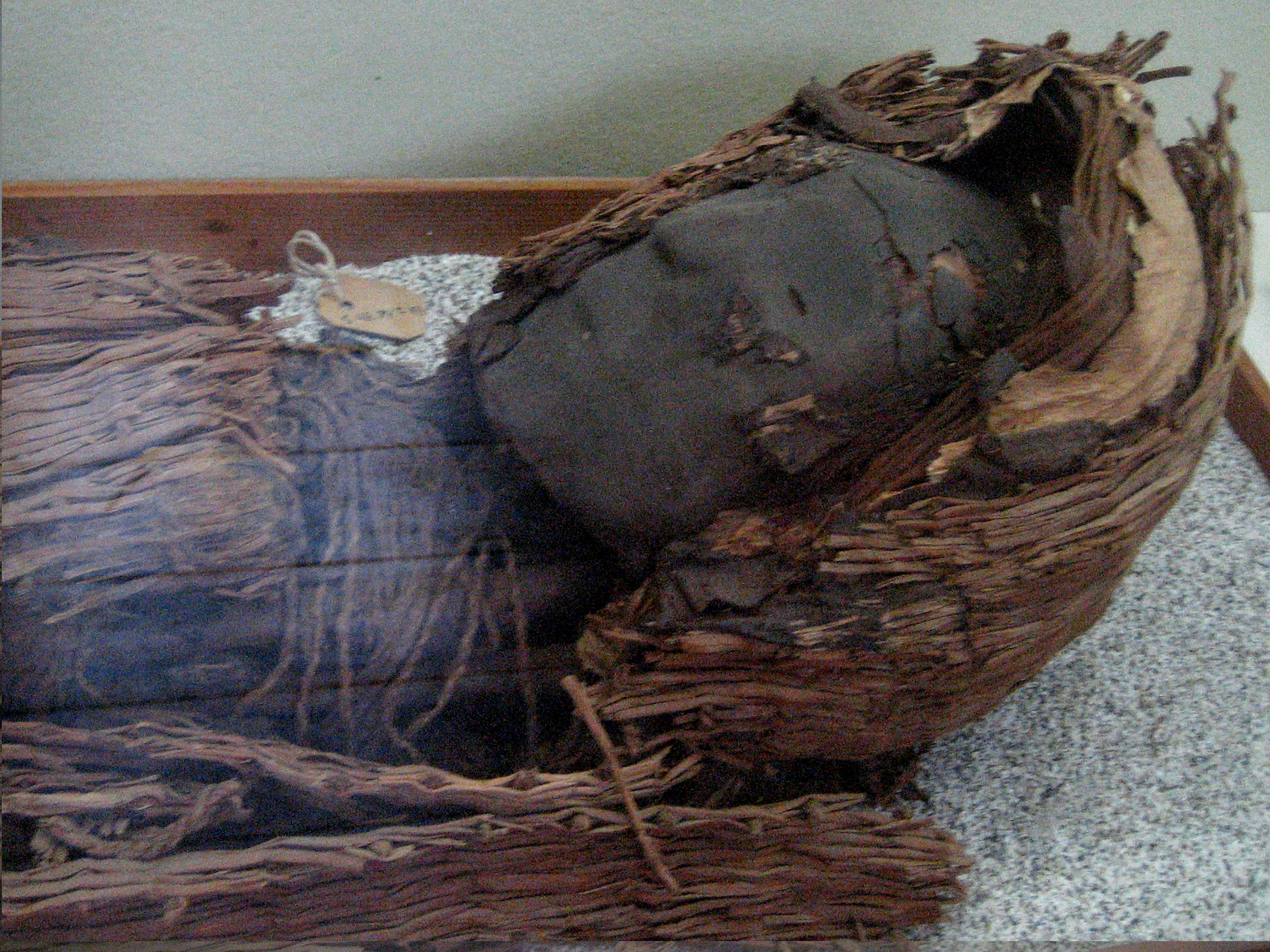
Head of a Chinchorro mummy found in northern Chile

For centuries, Chinchorro mummies were uncovered naturally as wind erosion and shifting sands exposed ancient burials along the Pacific coast of the Atacama Desert. Following the War of the Pacific (1879–1884), military activity and development around Arica, a coastal city in northern Chile, revealed additional cemeteries, and reports of the remarkably well-preserved bodies began appearing in local newspapers. Although these discoveries attracted growing attention, the mummies were still thought to be isolated burials rather than the remains of a previously unknown culture.

About 30 years later, on 29 January 1910, Chilean teacher and amateur archaeologist Pedro P. Canales published one of the first detailed descriptions of the mummies in the newspaper El Pacífico. Writing about Indigenous cemeteries around Arica and Tacna, a city in southern Peru about 60 kilometres (37 mi) northeast of Arica, he described the large number of naturally preserved bodies and urged that the human remains and the objects buried with them be collected and studied. Later that year, his paper was presented at the Seventeenth International Congress of Americanists in Buenos Aires, Argentina, bringing reports of the mummies to an international scholarly audience. Even then, the bodies had not yet been recognised as belonging to a distinct archaeological culture.

Systematic study of the mummies began in 1914, when German archaeologist Max Uhle excavated several cemeteries around Arica. His work marked the beginning of more than a century of archaeological research into the Chinchorro mummies and the people who created them.

== Condition and preservation ==
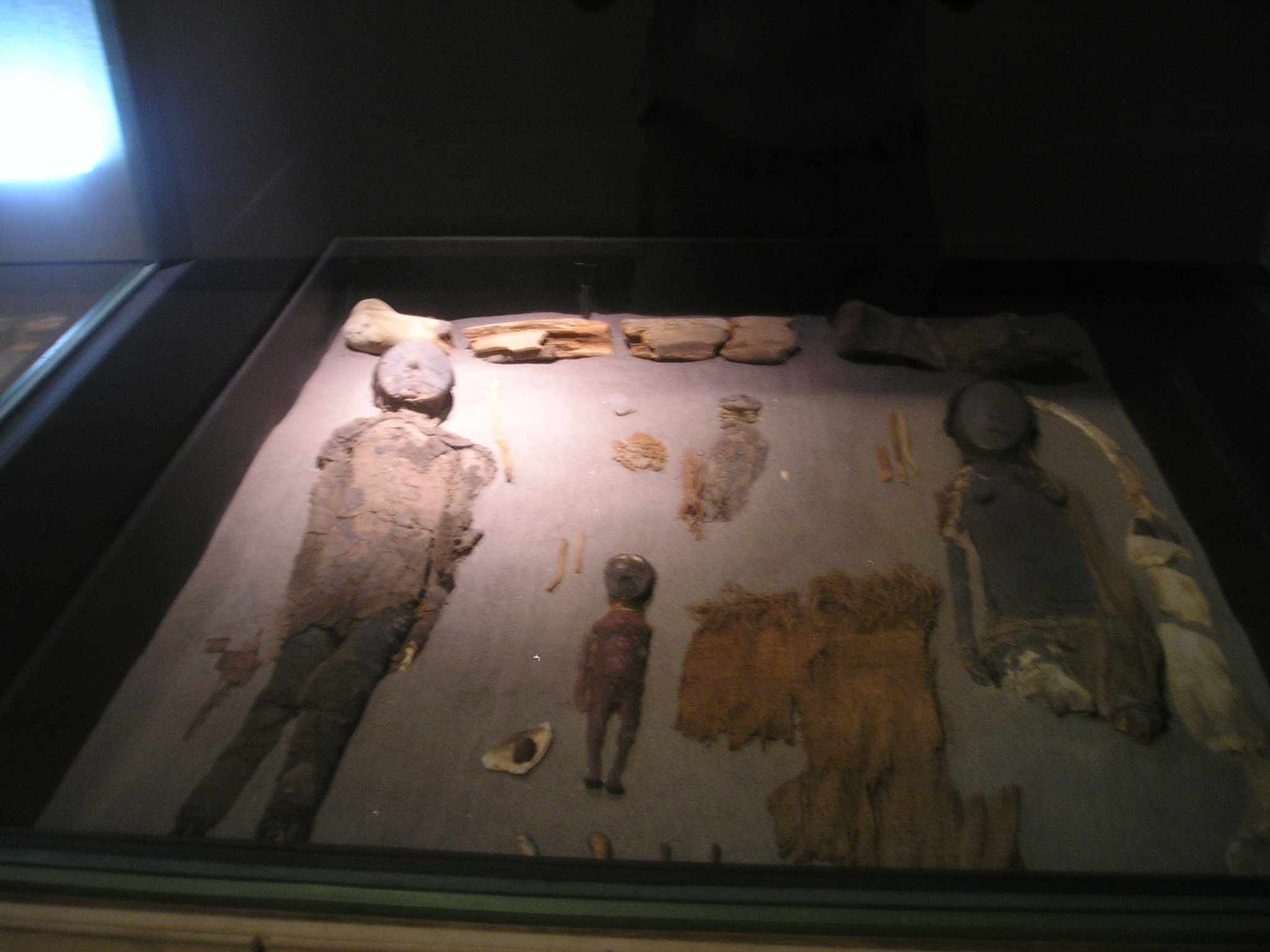
Chinchorro mummies displayed at the Museo Arqueológico San Miguel de Azapa, near Arica, Chile

Since 1914, archaeologists have documented the remains of about 282 members of the Chinchorro culture from cemeteries along the Pacific coast of northern Chile. One of the largest burial grounds, Morro-I near Arica, contained the remains of 96 individuals, including 54 adults and 42 children. Of the children, seven were female, twelve male and 23 were of indeterminate sex.

The remains have been recovered in a wide range of conditions. Some individuals retain skin, hair and other soft tissues, while others survive mainly as skeletons or partial remains. Clay masks, coloured pigments, reed wrappings and other materials used to prepare the dead have also survived.

The exceptional preservation of the remains reflects both the hyper-arid environment of the Atacama Desert and the methods the Chinchorro used to prepare their dead. As a result, archaeologists have been able to examine both naturally and artificially preserved individuals in exceptional detail.

== Scientific study ==
=== Chronology ===
Scientific study has shown that Chinchorro mortuary practices developed over more than 5,000 years. The earliest known naturally preserved individual associated with the culture, known as Acha Man, died around 7020 BCE. His body was preserved by the hyper-arid conditions of the Atacama Desert.

By about 5050 BCE, the Chinchorro had begun preserving their dead through artificial mummification. The earliest known example is a child buried in the Camarones Valley, about 60 kilometres (37 mi) south of Arica, in what is now northern Chile. Artificial mummification continued for about 3,000 years before ending around 1800 BCE.

Archaeologists recognise several forms of Chinchorro mummification, including black, red, mud-coated and bandage mummies. Although these forms are associated with different periods, their dates overlap, and more than one technique has been found within the same cemetery. The evidence therefore does not support a simple sequence in which one method completely replaced another.

=== Imaging and genetic studies ===
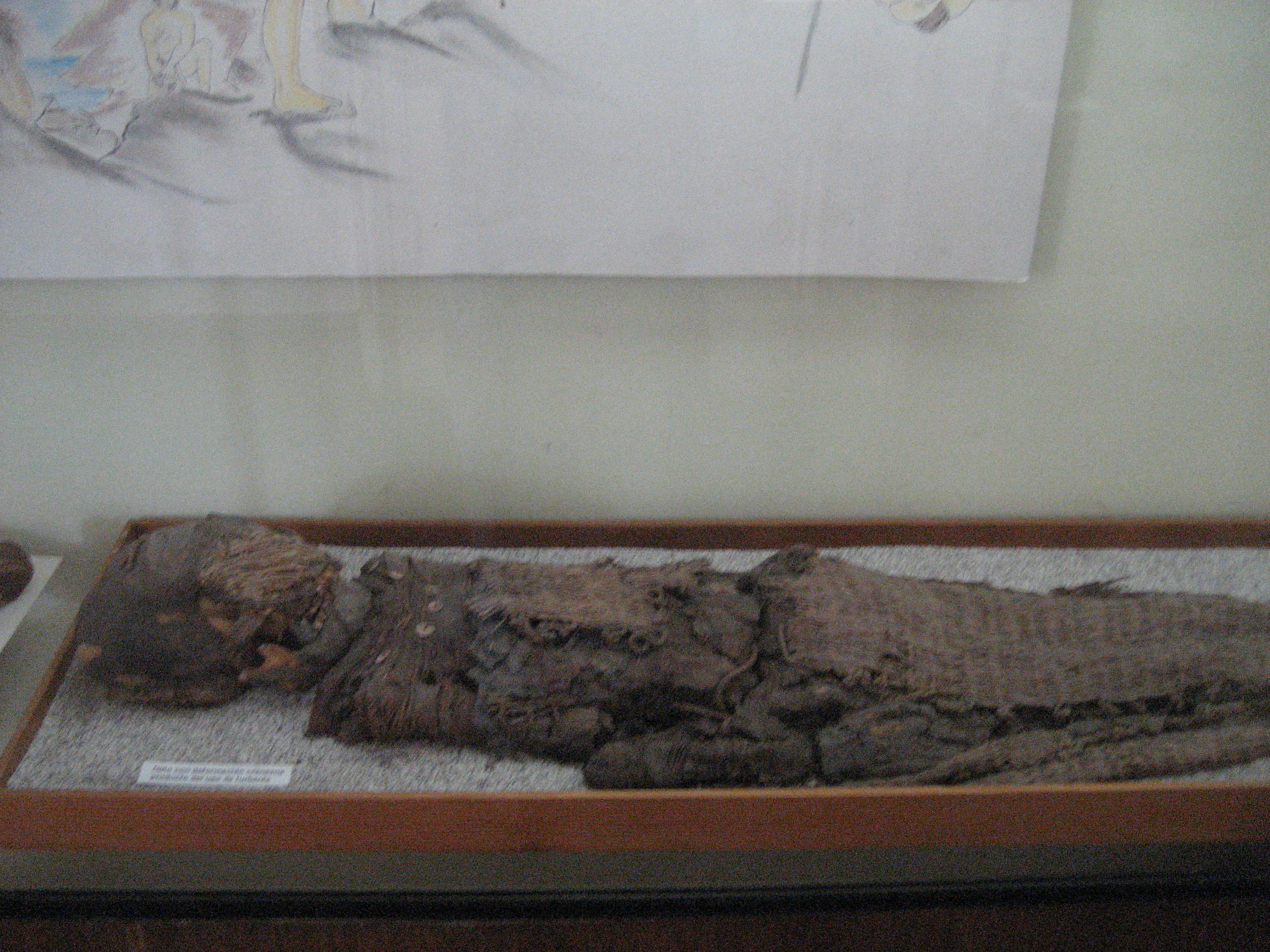
Chinchorro mummy from northern Peru

The Chinchorro mummies have been examined using imaging and genetic techniques intended to limit damage to the fragile remains. In 2016, 15 mummies, including adults, children and infants, underwent computed tomography (CT) scanning. The scans allowed researchers to examine the bodies without opening them.

Thousands of cross-sectional images showed the internal structure of the mummies, including wooden supports, packing materials and surviving soft tissue. Researchers planned to use the images for virtual dissections and digital reconstructions of the individuals' muscles and facial features. The scans also showed that one small object previously believed to be a mummy did not contain a human skeleton and was instead a figurine.

Small samples of skin and hair were also collected for planned genetic testing. Separate DNA studies have identified individuals from the Chinchorro culture as belonging to mitochondrial haplogroup A2.

=== Diet and health ===
Scientists have studied Chinchorro remains to reconstruct aspects of their diet, health and living conditions. Chemical analysis found that most of their food came from the sea, supplemented by land animals and plants gathered near river mouths. The findings support other archaeological evidence that the Chinchorro depended heavily on the Pacific coast for food.

Preserved hair has been used to study exposure to arsenic, a toxic substance that occurs naturally in drinking water in northern Chile. In a 2010 study, researchers tested 46 hair samples from five burial sites, including Chinchorro remains from Morro, Yungay and the Camarones Valley. Samples from Morro and Camarones, as well as from Iquique, had arsenic concentrations above 10 micrograms per gram. The Camarones Valley is about 100 kilometres (62 mi) south of Arica.

Researchers have also found evidence of head lice in preserved Chinchorro hair. They examined a 2 cm × 2 cm (0.79 in × 0.79 in) area of scalp on each of 63 mummies from the Arica-Camarones coast dating from about 5000 to 3000 years ago. Fifty of the 63 mummies, or about 79 percent, had lice or their eggs. The researchers suggested that the frequency of lice could help investigate how closely people lived together and how settled Chinchorro communities were.

=== Modern conservation ===
After surviving for about 7,000 years in the extremely dry Atacama Desert, some Chinchorro mummies have begun to deteriorate under modern storage conditions. A 2016 study reported increasingly rapid damage during the previous decade among mummies held at the University of Tarapacá in Arica, northern Chile. Areas of preserved skin had darkened and begun to ooze.

Researchers from Harvard University and the University of Tarapacá found bacteria and fungi on the damaged skin, including microorganisms capable of breaking down collagen and keratin, important proteins in human skin. Experiments showed that deterioration increased sharply at 75–80 percent relative humidity. After 21 days, mummy skin kept at this humidity showed increased collagen breakdown. The researchers recommended keeping museum collections at about 40–60 percent relative humidity, since very dry conditions can also damage the remains.

Conservation is more difficult for Chinchorro remains still buried in the Atacama Desert. Some lie close to the surface and may be exposed by construction, erosion or other disturbances. Unlike museum collections, archaeological sites cannot be kept at controlled temperature and humidity, leaving unexcavated remains vulnerable to environmental changes that increase moisture.

== Cultural interpretation ==
The mummies may have served as a means of assisting the soul in surviving and preventing the bodies from frightening the living. A more commonly accepted theory is that there was an ancestor cult of sorts, since there is evidence that the bodies travelled with the groups, were placed in positions of honour during major rituals, and were not buried permanently until some time after death.

The bodies, which were always found in an extended position, were elaborately decorated and coloured, sometimes repainted, and are thought to have been reinforced and stiffened so they could be carried on reed litters and displayed. Because the Chinchorro were a preceramic and partly nomadic society, the archaeological record has made it difficult to determine why these practices developed.

== Chinchorro mummification ==
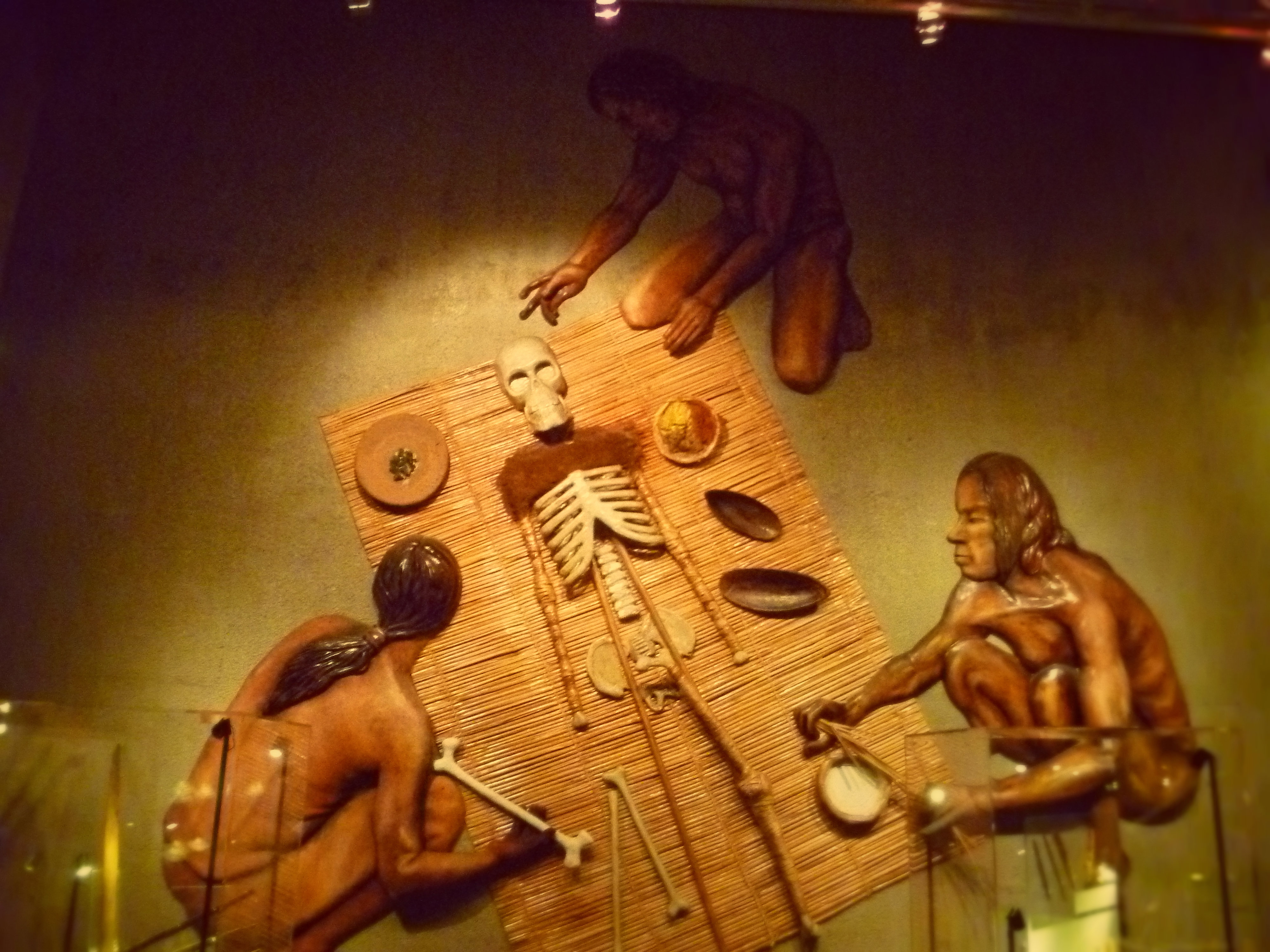
Reconstruction of Chinchorro mummification at the Museo Arqueológico y Antropológico de San Miguel de Azapa, Chile

The Chinchorro developed methods of artificial mummification that were practised for several millennia and changed through time and region. Artificially prepared remains include men, women and children from across the social spectrum, rather than a group defined by age, sex or social status. Some of the earliest known artificially prepared Chinchorro remains are those of infants and children.

Preparation varied considerably. Depending on the period and style, bodies could be dismembered and reconstructed, internally treated through incisions, reinforced and reshaped with materials including wooden poles, reeds and clay, fitted with human-hair wigs, and finished with mineral pigments. These practices did not form a single standardized or strictly sequential process. Different forms overlapped chronologically, and different types of mummies occur within the same cemeteries.

Archaeologist Bernardo Arriaza grouped artificially prepared Chinchorro mummies into four main types, known as black, red, bandaged and mud-coated mummies. These methods changed over time and sometimes overlapped, while other forms of treatment have also been identified, including wrapping bodies in reed cords. Not every Chinchorro mummy, however, was deliberately preserved. Some bodies became mummified naturally, as the extremely dry conditions of the Atacama Desert slowed decomposition and preserved the remains.

=== Bandage technique ===
The bandage technique is a rare form of Chinchorro mummification known from three infants. The body was skinned and strengthened with sticks, then wrapped in strips of human or animal skin about 2 cm (0.79 in) wide. The head and face were prepared in the same way as those of red mummies, and the body was painted red.

The three infants have not been directly radiocarbon dated. Based on the way the bodies were prepared, they are thought to have been contemporary with the red mummies. An adult mummy with similar bandaging limited to the legs has also been documented.

=== Black mummy technique ===
The black mummy technique was used from about 5000 to 2800 BCE and is the oldest of the main Chinchorro artificial mummification methods. The earliest examples are known from the Camarones area on the Pacific coast of northern Chile, where the technique was in use by about 5000 BCE. Later black mummies have been found at several sites around Arica, where the method became more elaborate.

Preparing a black mummy involved taking the body apart and rebuilding it. The skin was removed, followed by the soft tissue and internal organs, and the skeleton was disassembled. The bones were cleaned and returned to their correct positions. They then strengthened the reconstructed skeleton from the head to the ankles with thin wooden poles, tied in place with reed cords. The inside of the body was filled with materials including grasses. A layer of grey clay about 2 to 4 cm (0.79 to 1.57 in) thick, depending on the part of the body, covered the bones, wooden supports and cords and was used to restore the body's shape.

Once the body had been rebuilt, surviving human skin was placed over it. Seal or sea lion skin could be used where the person's own skin was missing. The face and other features were modelled, and a short wig made from human hair was attached to the head. Finally, the reconstructed body was covered with a thin layer of black manganese dioxide-based paint, while the wig was left unpainted. This dark coating gives black mummies their name.

=== Mud coat technique ===
The final style of Chinchorro mummification was the mud-coat (3000-1300 BCE). Ecologically speaking, at the time of the Chinchorro culture the region was relatively stable. It has been suggested by environmentalists that the incredible preservation of these mummies is also influenced by the pedogenic (the evolution of soil) creation of clays and gypsum, which act as cementing agents, and the latter as a natural desiccant. The malleable clay allowed for the morticians to mold and create the colorful appearances of mummies, with the added bonus of the fact that the foul smell of the desiccating mummy would be covered. Artisans no longer removed the organs of the dead; instead a thick coat of mud, sand and a binder like egg or fish glue was used to cover the bodies. Once completed the mummies were cemented into their graves. The change in style may have come from exposure to outsiders and their different cultures, or from the association of disease with the rotting corpses.

=== Red mummy technique ===
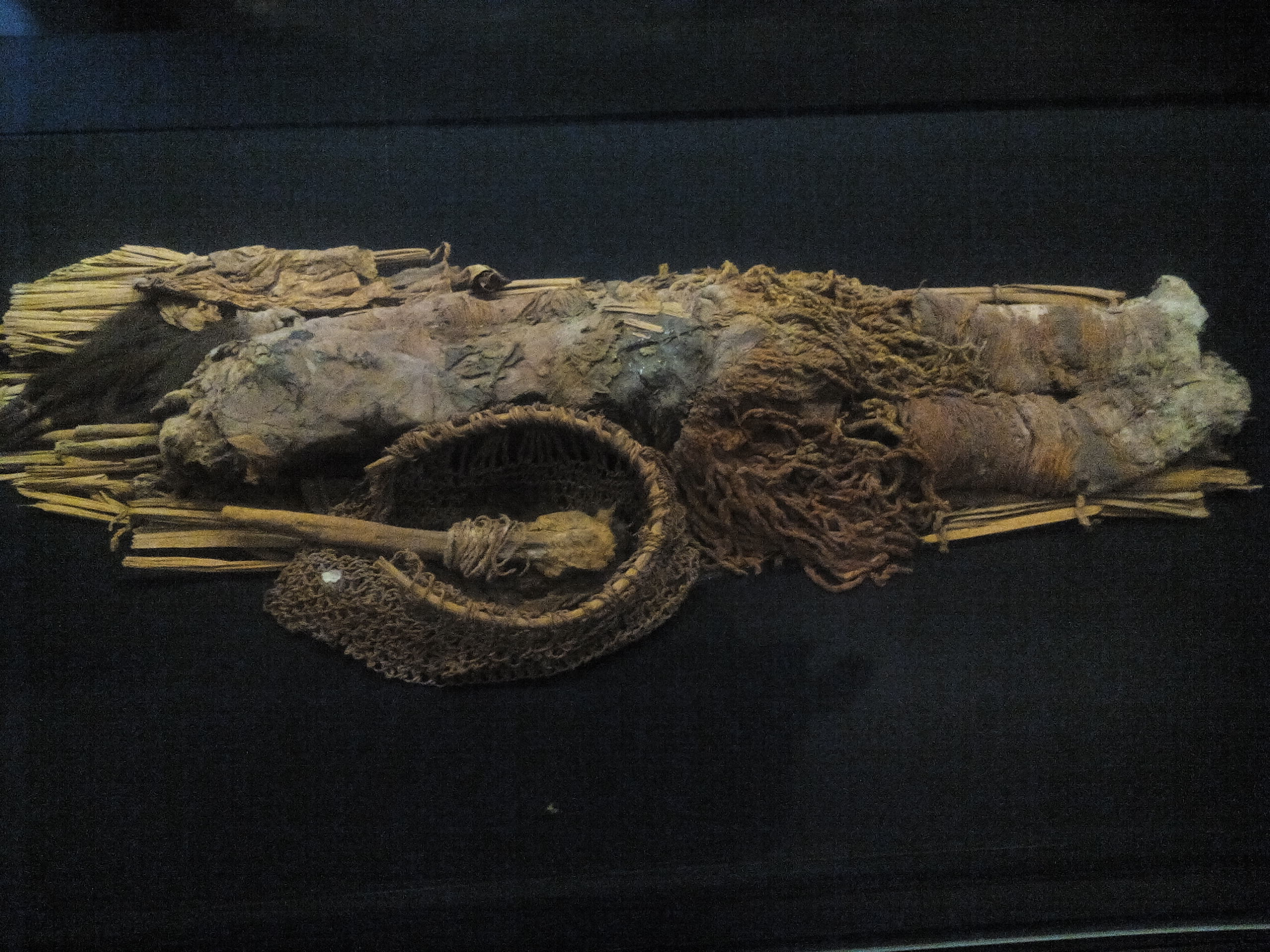
Red-type Chinchorro mummy of an infant at the Museo Arqueológico San Miguel de Azapa

The red mummy technique is dated to about 2570 to 2090 BCE and has been found at sites along the coast of northern Chile, including Arica, Camarones, Punta Pichalo, Bajo Molle and Patillos. Unlike the black mummy technique, the body was not completely taken apart. Instead, incisions were made at several points on the body, including the shoulders and groin, to remove the internal organs and some of the muscles. The head was removed so that the brain could be extracted, and the body cavities were dried with glowing coals and ashes.

Thin wooden poles were inserted beneath the skin through the arms, legs and along the spine to strengthen the body. The empty cavities and head were then packed with materials including seabird feathers, soil and camelid fibre to restore the body's shape. The incisions were sewn closed with human hair or reed fibres.

The head was reattached and fitted with an elaborate wig made from human hair, sometimes reaching about 60 cm (24 in) in length. The wig was held in place with a black manganese paste, and the facial features were modelled. Finally, the body was covered with red ochre, while the face was generally left black.

=== Natural mummification ===
Of the 282 Chinchorro mummies found to date, 29% of them were results of the natural mummification process (7020–1300 BCE). In northern Chile, environmental conditions greatly favor natural mummification. The soil is very rich in nitrates which, when combined with other factors such as the aridity of the Atacama Desert, ensure organic preservation. Salts halt bacterial growth; the hot, dry conditions facilitate rapid desiccation, evaporating all bodily fluids of the corpses. Soft tissues, as a result, dry before they decay and a naturally preserved mummy is left. Even though the Chinchorro people did not mummify the bodies artificially, the bodies were still buried wrapped in reeds with grave goods.

== Tattooing ==
At least one Chinchorro mummy bears remarkable witness to the antiquity of tattooing in the region. The remains of a male (Mo-1 T28 C22) with a mustache-like dotted line tattooed above his upper lip and dating to 1880 +/- 100 BCE (2563–1972 cal BCE) is believed to represent the oldest direct evidence of tattooing in the Americas and the fourth-oldest such evidence in the world.

== Museum ==
The Museo Arqueológico Universidad de Tarapacá, San Miguel de Azapa (MASMA), sometimes called the San Miguel de Azapa Archaeological Museum, in San Miguel de Azapa, Arica y Parinacota region, Chile physically cares for and stewards many of the Chinchorro mummies.

== See also ==
- Burial ritual
- Cultural periods of Peru
- Mummy
- Mummy Juanita

== Bibliography ==
- Aufderheide, Arthur C. (2003). The Scientific Study of Mummies. Cambridge University Press. p. 142. ISBN 0521818265.
- Arriaza, Bernardo (1995). "Chile's Chinchorro Mummies". National Geographic. Archived from the original on 2012-08-19.
