= Baldy Center for Law and Social Policy =

The Baldy Center for Law and Social Policy is a research center at the University at Buffalo that advances interdisciplinary research on law, legal institutions and social policy. Founded in 1978, The Baldy Center is housed within UB’s School of Law but serves faculty with law and policy interests throughout the university. The Center was endowed by a bequest from Christopher Baldy, a prominent Buffalo attorney and UB School of Law graduate who died in 1959.

== Activities ==
The Baldy Center sponsors interdisciplinary research focusing on the intersection of law and social policy, awarding research grants annually to scholars across the university, especially in law, the humanities and social sciences. It also hosts and sponsors conferences that bring together researchers from across the world to discuss their Law and Society-related research. A list of grants awarded for research and conferences and their recipients is available at the Center's website.

The Center’s intensive book manuscript workshops are organized around drafts of books about law, legal institutions or social policy by UB-affiliated scholars. The interdisciplinary discussions are designed to provide feedback to the authors from interested faculty and outside specialists.

The Baldy Center maintains cooperative ties to other interdisciplinary research centers and cosponsors a regional network of sociolegal scholars in New York and Canada. The Center additionally hosts distinguished scholars from around the world as visitors, speakers, consultants and conference participants.

The Center offers postdoctoral fellowships to budding scholars hoping to join the academy at American and global universities, along with research fellowships and senior fellowships. Research fellowships link law-and-policy scholars into the Baldy community and its resources, while senior fellowships are geared toward accomplished academics from other universities whose projects are closely related to the Baldy Center’s mission.

Through the Buffalo Legal Studies Research Paper Series, hosted and distributed by the Social Science Research Network, the Center provides an international audience for faculty and visiting scholars.

== History ==
Christopher Baldy graduated from the Buffalo School of Law in 1910, in the days when UB was a private school. He died a bachelor and left most of his estate, initially valued at $1.4 million, to his three brothers, stipulating that when they died, the remainder would be a gift to UB.

A surrogate judge in 1973 approved using the Baldy funding to start a new program in law and social policy, a subject area favored by UB’s law dean, Red Schwartz, a sociologist and the first-ever non-interim dean of an American law school who was not a lawyer. Schwartz was a key figure in the Law and Society movement that emerged in the 1960s and sought to explore how the law actually interacted with society, as opposed to the more formalistic, theoretical and academic approach that permeated legal scholarship for much of the 20th century.

Five years later, under then-Dean Thomas Headrick, the program in law and social policy was formalized into The Baldy Center.

From 1981 to 2009, the Center hosted the peer-reviewed academic journal Law & Policy.

For much of its history, The Baldy Center’s activities were organized around working groups focused on specific research areas. The number of groups fluctuated over time and during the 1990s were concentrated into more formal Baldy Programs such as Environmental Law and Policy; Children, Families and the Law; Community and Difference; Law, Gender and Social Policy; Human Rights Law and Policy; and Regulation and Public Policy.

After 2010, the Center retired the working groups model and instituted its fellowship program while continuing to focus on conferences, book manuscript workshops and supporting research. In 2020, The Baldy Center developed The Baldy Center Podcast and The Baldy Center Blog as online mechanisms to share law and social policy research performed by UB scholars and former Center fellows.

== Directors ==
Directors of the Baldy Center have included Barry B. Boyer (co-director 1978-81; director 1981-92), Jim Brady (co-director 1978-81), David M. Engel (1992-2001), Lynn Mather (2002-08), Rebecca French (2008-10), Errol Meidinger (interim director 2001-02; director 2010-2019), Samantha Barbas (2019-2024), and Matthew Dimick (2024-present).

Assistant directors have included Wendy Katkin (1978-85), Venice Feeley Cadwallader (1986-90), Laura Mangan (1990-2006; 2008-09), Laura Wirth (2009-2019), and Caroline Funk (2019-2022). Amanda M. Benzin joined The Baldy Center as Associate Director in 2022.
