= Chungará (journal) =

- Discipline: Anthropology
- Language: English, Spanish
- Edited by: Vivien G. Standen

Publication details
- History: 1972–present
- Publisher: Departamento de Antropología (Universidad de Tarapacá) (Chile)
- Frequency: Quarterly
- Impact factor: 0.895 (2015)

Standard abbreviations
- ISO 4: Chungará

Indexing
- ISSN: 0716-1182 (print); 0717-7356 (web)
- LCCN: 76647090
- OCLC no.: 746941986

Links
- Journal homepage; Online archive

Chungará: Revista de Antropología Chilena (English: The Journal of Chilean Anthropology) is a peer-reviewed academic journal on anthropology and archaeology with particular, but not exclusive, focus on the Andean region. The journal is published by the Departamento de Antropología (Universidad de Tarapacá) and the editor-in-chief is Vivien G. Standen (Universidad de Tarapacá).

== Abstracting and indexing ==
The journal is abstracted and indexed in the Social Sciences Citation Index, Current Contents/Social & Behavioral Sciences, and Scopus. According to the Journal Citation Reports, the journal has a 2014 impact factor of 0.694.
