= University of Tarapacá =

University in Arica, Chile

- Universidad de Tarapacá
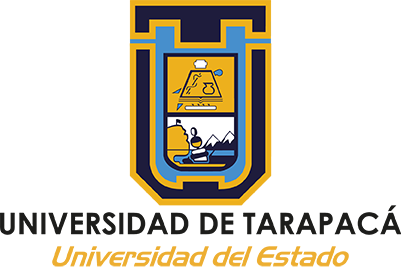
- Motto: Universidad de verdad
- Motto in English: University of Truth
- Type: Public
- Established: 1981; 45 years ago
- Students: 11,270 (2026)
- Undergraduates: 10,978
- Postgraduates: 292
- Location: Arica, Chile; 18°28′16″S 70°18′41″W
- Location within Chile

The University of Tarapacá (Spanish: Universidad de Tarapacá) is a Chilean state university, with its main campus located in Arica, Chile. It is a derivative of the Chilean Traditional Universities, and is part of the Group of Regional Universities of Chile, the Council of Rectors of Chilean Universities, and the Consortium of State Universities of Chile. The university is globally recognized for its constant contribution to the development of archaeology in the Norte Grande of Chile and for its rapid growth and strategic positioning at both the national and Latin American levels.

Currently, the university is accredited by the National Accreditation Commission (CNA-Chile) for a period of 6 years (out of a maximum of 7), from June 2023 to June 2029. It ranks 18th among Chilean universities according to the 2024 SCImago Institutions Rankings (SIR) webometric classification. It holds the 15th position in the 2024 Webometrics ranking. It is ranked 21st-25th nationally in the 2024 QS Rankings. Additionally, it is positioned 6th-16th nationally in the 2024 Times Higher Education ranking.

A high percentage of its instructors have had access to various training programs, and 82% of them have master's and doctoral degrees. Additionally, the university publishes Revista Chungará a journal on anthropology and archaeology.

== History ==
The University of Tarapacá was founded in 1981 through DFL No. 150, issued on December 11, 1981, as an autonomous public corporation with legal personality and its own assets. It was established as part of the decentralization process carried out during the higher education reform under the military dictatorship, beginning its activities in 1982.

Although officially founded in 1981 from the Professional Institute of Arica, the University of Tarapacá has a history spanning over 40 years as the successor of both the Arica branch of the University of Chile (which was transformed into the Professional Institute of Arica in 1981) and the Arica branch of the Universidad Católica del Norte. Most of its faculty members originally came from the Pontifical Catholic University of Valparaíso, which founded the Universidad Católica del Norte.

During its first year, the university established the Faculty of Sciences and the Faculty of Education and Humanities.

Years later, in 1994, through a real estate acquisition, the university obtained the Saucache and Azapa campuses.

In 2004, the university launched the Iquique branch and inaugurated its central library at the Saucache campus. The following year, an annex to the library was opened, and university schools were created. In 2006, the Institute of Advanced Research was established. By 2007, the Esmeralda branch in Iquique was under construction.

Since its founding, the University of Tarapacá has played a key role in the economic, social, and cultural development of the region. It was accredited for five years (2012-2017) by the National Accreditation Commission, covering the areas of institutional management, undergraduate teaching, research, and community engagement.

== Administration ==
The highest organizational body of the University of Tarapacá is the Board of Directors. Among its functions is proposing a shortlist to the President of the Republic for the appointment of the Rector and designating the senior officials of the university in accordance with its statutes.

The Rector's Office is the highest unit responsible for overseeing the academic, administrative, and financial activities of the university. This responsibility is held by the Rector.

Regarding the oversight of the legality of the actions of the university's authorities, the responsibility lies with the Comptroller's Office. This office also monitors the income and use of funds, reviews the accounts of individuals in charge of the Corporation's assets, and performs other related functions as assigned by the Board of Directors. Its support units are the Audit Office and the Legal Control Office.

The current Rector of the University of Tarapacá is Emilio Rodríguez Ponce.

#	Rector	Período
1	Carlos Valcarce Medina	1982-1987
2	Hernán Sudy Pinto	1988
3	Juan José Valcarce Ortiz	1989
4	Jorge Urquhart Matheu	1990-1993
5	Luis Tapia Iturrieta	1994-2001
6	Emilio Rodríguez Ponce	2002-2005
7	Sergio Pulido Roccatagliata	2006-2009
8	Emilio Rodríguez Ponce	2010-2013
9	Arturo Flores Franuliĉ	2014-2017
10	Emilio Rodríguez Ponce	2018-2026
11	Jenniffer Peralta Montecinos	2026-presente

== Campus and Branches ==
Geographically, the Main Campus is located in the Arica and Parinacota Region. The university has three campuses in Arica, one of which is situated in the locality of San Miguel de Azapa. Additionally, the university has a branch in the Tarapacá Region, in Iquique.

=== Velásquez Campus ===
This campus is located in downtown Arica, very close to the city's coastline. It has over 1.5 hectares of constructed area on a total surface exceeding three hectares. Previously, the facilities housed the Arica branch of the University of Chile, and in 2007, part of its premises were leased to the Regional Government of Arica and Parinacota for temporary use.

The university's Rectorate, Vice-Rectorate, and Grand Auditorium are located on this campus. Academically, it hosts the Technical Training Center of Tarapacá (CFT) and most of the Faculty of Sciences.

=== Saucache Campus ===
Located in the southeast of Arica, this campus has 25,000 m2 of constructed space on 14 hectares of land. It was formerly part of the Arica branch of the Universidad del Norte.

The campus houses various administrative offices, including the General Academic Directorate, the Directorate of Teaching, Extension, and Communications, the Admissions and Student Selection Office, the Registrar's Office, the Directorate of Student Affairs, and the Central Library.

Academically, Saucache Campus is home to the Faculties of Education and Humanities, Social and Legal Sciences, the Schools of Business and Engineering, and part of the Faculty of Sciences.

=== Azapa Campus ===
Situated in San Miguel de Azapa, within the Azapa Valley, this campus is located 12 kilometers from Arica. It has over 3,000 m2 of built infrastructure on 85 hectares of land, mostly dedicated to activities related to the Faculty of Agronomy.

The facilities house the Department of Archaeology and Museology and the Archaeological and Anthropological Museum of San Miguel de Azapa.

=== Esmeralda-Iquique Branch ===
Since 2002, the university has maintained a branch in Iquique, located on Avenida Luis Emilio Recabarren. It began operations in 2003 and, since 2011, has offered various academic programs, including Law, Civil Engineering, Business Administration, Education, Psychology, and Social Work.
