= Tarata Department (Chile) =

Department of Chile (1911–1921)

Tarata
- Department of Chile
- 1911–1921
- Flag

- Tarata Department within Tacna Province
- Capital: Tarata
- Historical era: War of the Pacific
  - Established: 2 December 1911
  - Disestablished: 22 September 1921
  - Handover to Peru: 1 September 1925
- Contained within
  - Province: Tacna
- Subdivisions
  - Type: Sub-delegations
  - Units: See list: Tarata; Sama
Preceded by	Succeeded by
Tacna Department	Tacna Department
- Today part of: Peru

Tarata was a department of Tacna, a province of Chile. Located in the Atacama Desert, it existed between 1911 and 1921. Prior to its formal establishment, its area had been administered as part of Tacna Department. Its capital was Tarata.

The Treaty of Ancón, which put an end to the War of the Pacific, was signed on October 20, 1883. The following year, the province was formally created on October 31, incorporating the former Peruvian provinces of Tacna, Arica and Tarata. Under the treaty, the territory would be administered by Chile for a ten-year period, after which a plebiscite would determine its fate. Originally meant to be held in 1894, was ultimately not carried out. Due to differing interpretations of the course of the Sama River, the province's provisional northern border, the area's administration by Chile proved controversial.

Following the mediation of U.S. President Calvin Coolidge, the department was abolished in 1921, and its territory returned to Peru in 1925. The dispute regarding Tacna and Arica continued into 1929, ending through the signing of the Treaty of Lima, under which Tacna would be returned to Peru, while Arica would be formally incorporated into Chile.

== History ==
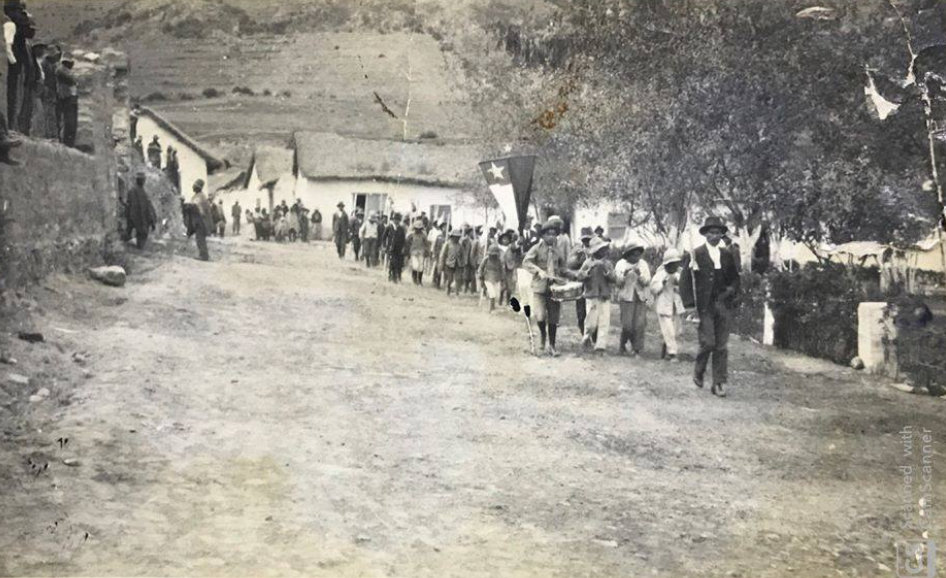
School parade in Tarata carrying the flag of Chile.

In 1885, after the Chilean victory in the War of the Pacific, Chile integrated Tarata into the Tacna Department of the newly formed Tacna Province. The department was officially created under president Ramón Barros' administration on December 2, 1911, under law № 2,575, published in the Chilean Diario Oficial newspaper. The department's territory was composed of the 8th and 9th sub-delegations (subdelegaciones) of Tacna Department. The comune of Tarata was chosen as its capital, and some parts of its administration, such as its judicial administration, were shared with nearby Arica Department. Ticalaco River served as its northern boundary, and the former Peruvian districts of Tarata, Tarucachi and Estique, were placed under its jurisdiction.

The creation of the department caused controversy in Peru, due to both countries disagreeing on their border in the Sama river. While the Chilean government argued the town was to the east of the river, the border agreed upon by both countries, Peru disputed this claim on the grounds that the territory was not affected by the Treaty of Ancón and sent representative Carlos Maria Elías to protest the situation, also establishing a policy of non-recognition. Around this time, raids by Peruvian smugglers as well as soldiers took place in the region, and there were also claims of military escalation, including claims of Peruvian troops mobilizing near the Chilean border, which were denied by the Peruvian government. U.S. President Calvin Coolidge mediated the dispute in Peru's favor in 1925, more so than other heads of state. Around the same time, a commission, headed by U.S. General John J. Pershing arrived to assist with the planned Tacna-Arica plebiscite, which never took place.

The department was abolished under Arturo Alessandri's administration by law № 3,802 on September 22, 1921.

=== Intracommunal violence ===
The tense atmosphere stemming from the disagreements regarding the border and a political administration actively disputed by Peru aggravated an already delicate situation, which was further affected by physical and sexual violence.

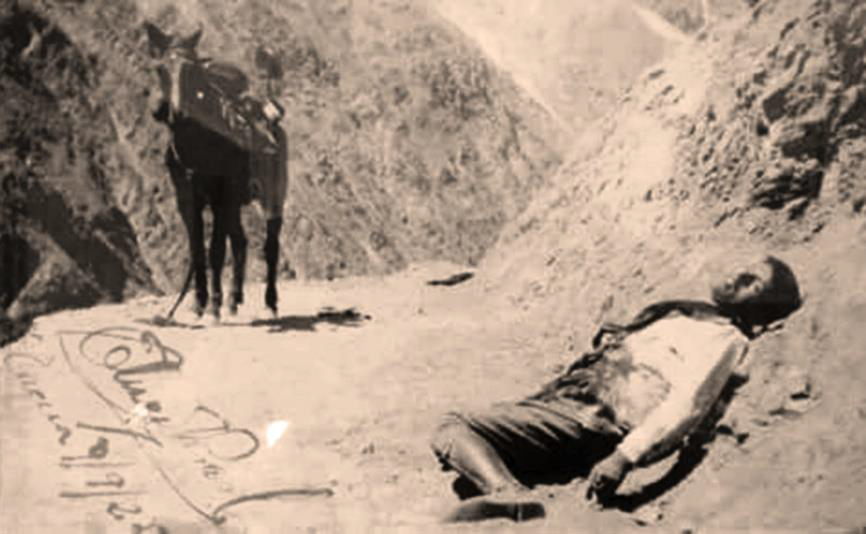
The body of Aguayo and his horse.

On the night of August 29, Manuel Aguayo Paillalef, a Carabinero originally from Carahue, was sent to the town of Chucatamani to order the local detachment to head to Tarata, the former department's capital, as part of the process taking place prior to the handover of the area to Peru. Prior to his arrival, however, he was shot by Peruvian assailants in the back, being carried by his horse until finally dying on the outskirts of the town. Aguayo was buried in Tacna and his horse, never to be ridden again, was taken to Arica, where he would be renamed from Metal to Abismo and would continue to live the rest of his days until his death on August 7, 1952. The town's inhabitants fled north to avoid reprisals. A ceremony commemorating the deceased was held in Tacna on November 1, 1927.

In another occasion, Domingo Castro, then governor of Chucatamani, killed a Chilean soldier for "crossing over to the Peruvian side," after which the town's population had to sleep in the nearby hills for fear of reprisals. Castro also apprehended Juan Muñoz Padilla, a Carabinero, for the same reason, taking him to the Peruvian authorities in Ticaco.

=== Reincorporation to Peru ===
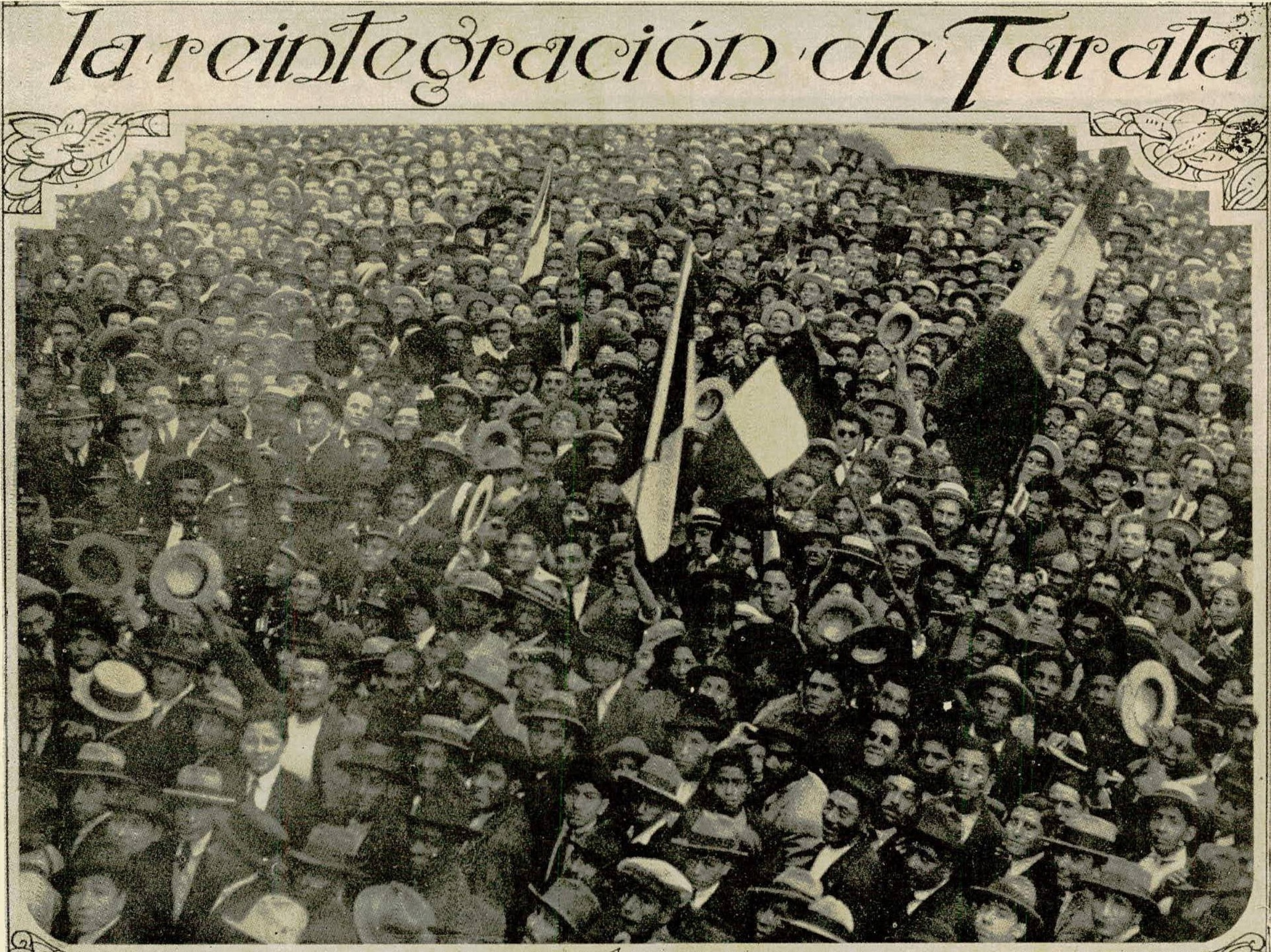
The handover, as seen in Mundial.

On September 1, 1925, at exactly 10 a.m., Chile handed over the former Department to Peru in a ceremony that took place in the main square, with representatives from both countries present. Newspaper publisher Agustín Edwards Budge represented Chile, diplomat Manuel de Freyre y Santander appeared for Peru, and General Pershing represented the United States.

== Administration ==
The Municipality of Tacna oversaw the administration of the department of Tacna, including Tarata, with its headquarters located in Tacna, where the Departmental Government, and the Provincial Intendancy were located.

With the Decree of Creation of Municipalities of December 22, 1891, the following municipalities were created with their headquarters and whose territories are the sub-delegations detailed below:

Municipality	Sub-delegations
Tarata; Tarata	Pocollai
Tarata; Tarata	Pachía
Tarata; Tarata	Palca
Tarata; Tarata	Tarata
Tarata; Tarata	Sama
Tarata; Tarata	Calana

== See also ==
- Treaty of Ancón
- Tacna Province (Chile)
