= Estique District =

District of Peru

Coordinates: 17.5418°S 70.0185°W

Estique
- District
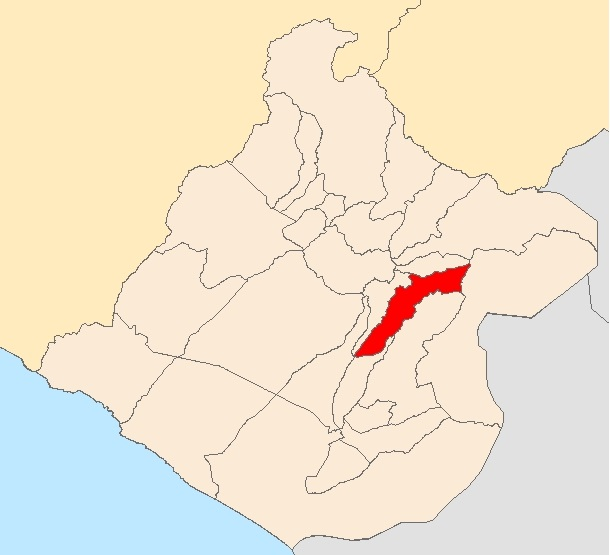
- Interactive map of Estique
- Country: Peru
- Department: Tacna
- Province: Tarata
- Founded: January 2, 1857
- Capital: Estique

Government
  - Mayor: Felix Maximiliano Tapia Chipana

Area
  - Total: 312.85 km^{2} (120.79 sq mi)
- Elevation: 3,148 m (10,328 ft)

Population (2005 census)
  - Total: 318
  - Density: 1.02/km^{2} (2.63/sq mi)
- Time zone: UTC-5 (PET)
- UBIGEO: 230403

Estique is a district of Tarata, a province of the department of Tacna, Peru. Its capital is Estique.

== History ==
Following the 1883 Treaty of Ancón, Chile established a province to administer its newly acquired territory south of the Sama River. Due to differing interpretations of the rivercourse, the area's administration by Chile proved controversial. Tarata was made a sub-delegation of Tacna, with its jurisdiction including the former Peruvian districts of Tarata, Tarucachi and Estique. The sub-delegation was elevated to department from 1911 to 1921, after which it was disestablished and handed over to Peru in 1925.

== Climate ==
Climate data for Talabaya, Estique, elevation 3,409 m (11,184 ft), (1991–2020)
Month	Jan	Feb	Mar	Apr	May	Jun	Jul	Aug	Sep	Oct	Nov	Dec	Year
Mean daily maximum °C (°F)	17.1 (62.8)	16.7 (62.1)	17.2 (63.0)	17.6 (63.7)	17.5 (63.5)	17.0 (62.6)	16.9 (62.4)	17.6 (63.7)	18.3 (64.9)	18.3 (64.9)	18.5 (65.3)	17.8 (64.0)	17.5 (63.6)
Mean daily minimum °C (°F)	4.5 (40.1)	4.8 (40.6)	3.6 (38.5)	2.1 (35.8)	0.7 (33.3)	−0.2 (31.6)	−0.3 (31.5)	0.4 (32.7)	1.6 (34.9)	2.3 (36.1)	2.7 (36.9)	3.4 (38.1)	2.1 (35.8)
Average precipitation mm (inches)	73.5 (2.89)	83.0 (3.27)	44.9 (1.77)	1.7 (0.07)	1.0 (0.04)	0.8 (0.03)	1.4 (0.06)	1.3 (0.05)	1.1 (0.04)	0.5 (0.02)	0.6 (0.02)	18.5 (0.73)	228.3 (8.99)
Source: National Meteorology and Hydrology Service of Peru

== See also ==
- Jach'a Qullu
- Qutañani
