= Tarucachi District =

District of Peru

Coordinates: 17.5263°S 70.0289°W

Tarucachi
- District
- Location of Tarucachi in the Tarata Province
- Country: Peru
- Department: Tacna
- Province: Tarata
- Founded: November 12, 1874
- Capital: Tarucachi

Government
  - Mayor: Vidal Ticona Limache

Area
  - Total: 113.27 km^{2} (43.73 sq mi)
- Elevation: 3,050 m (10,010 ft)

Population (2005 census)
  - Total: 337
  - Density: 2.98/km^{2} (7.71/sq mi)
- Time zone: UTC-5 (PET)
- UBIGEO: 230407

Tarucachi is a district of Tarata, a province of the department of Tacna, Peru. Its capital is Tarucachi.

== History ==
Following the 1883 Treaty of Ancón, Chile established a province to administer its newly acquired territory south of the Sama River. Due to differing interpretations of the rivercourse, the area's administration by Chile proved controversial. Tarata was made a sub-delegation of Tacna, with its jurisdiction including the former Peruvian districts of Tarata, Tarucachi and Estique. The sub-delegation was elevated to department from 1911 to 1921, after which it was disestablished and handed over to Peru in 1925.

== See also ==
- Khuruña
