= Tarata District =

District of Peru

Coordinates: 17.4747°S 70.0321°W

Tarata
- District
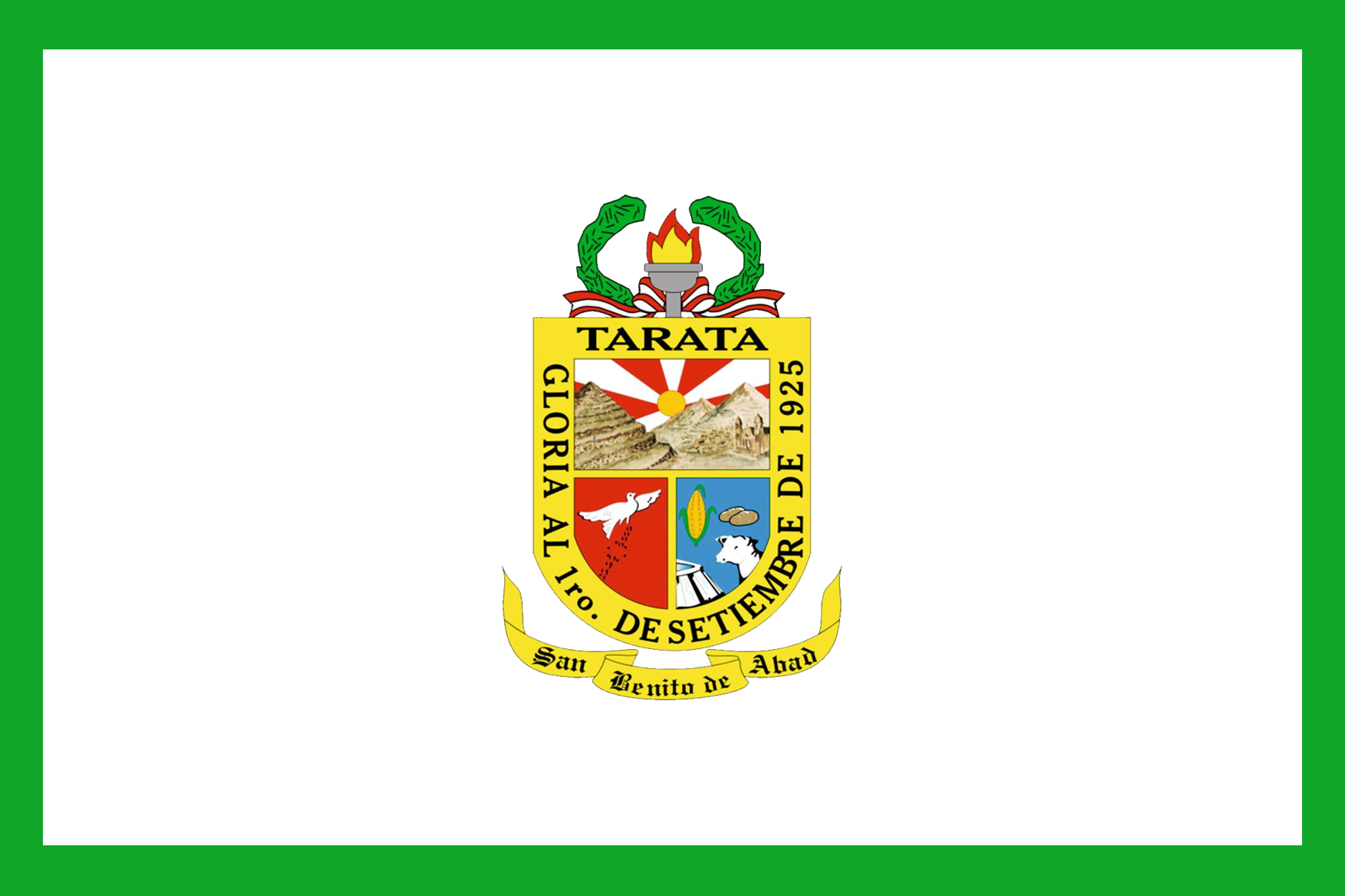
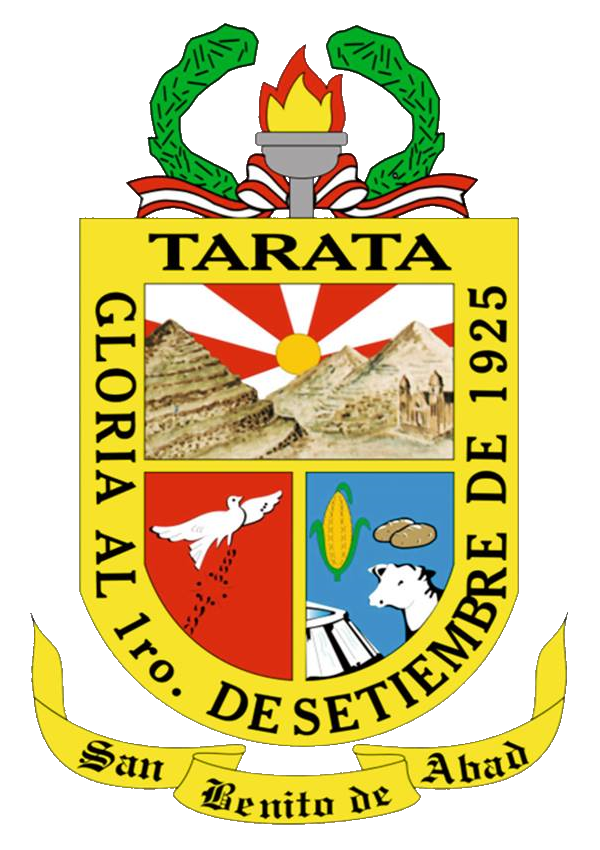
- Flag Coat of arms

- Location of Tarata in the Tarata Province
- Country: Peru
- Department: Tacna
- Province: Tarata
- Capital: Tarata

Government
  - Mayor: José Luis Ticona Sanjinez

Area
  - Total: 864.31 km^{2} (333.71 sq mi)
- Elevation: 3,068 m (10,066 ft)

Population (2005 census)
  - Total: 3,605
  - Density: 4.171/km^{2} (10.80/sq mi)
- Time zone: UTC-5 (PET)
- UBIGEO: 230401

Tarata is a district of Tarata, a province of the department of Tacna, Peru. Its capital is Tarata.

== History ==
Following the 1883 Treaty of Ancón, Chile established a province to administer its newly acquired territory south of the Sama River. Due to differing interpretations of the rivercourse, the area's administration by Chile proved controversial. Tarata was made a sub-delegation of Tacna, with its jurisdiction including the former Peruvian districts of Tarata, Tarucachi and Estique. The sub-delegation was elevated to department from 1911 to 1921, after which it was disestablished and handed over to Peru in 1925.

== Geography ==
The Barroso mountain range traverses the district. Some of the highest mountains of the district are listed below:

- Antajawi
- Chaka
- Chunta Qullu
- Ch'uxñuma
- Inka Apachita
- Iñuma
- Juqhuri
- Khuruña
- Laram Qullu
- Lluqu Qullu
- Pä Qullu
- Phusnu Pullawi
- Tawa Qullu
- Titiri
- Wallatiri
- Warawarani
- Wila Qullu
- Wila Uqharani
- Wiqu

== Climate ==
Climate data for Tarata, elevation 3,100 m (10,200 ft), (1991–2020)
| Month | Jan | Feb | Mar | Apr | May | Jun | Jul | Aug | Sep | Oct | Nov | Dec | Year |
|---|---|---|---|---|---|---|---|---|---|---|---|---|---|
| Mean daily maximum °C (°F) | 19.8 (67.6) | 19.6 (67.3) | 20.2 (68.4) | 21.0 (69.8) | 20.8 (69.4) | 20.6 (69.1) | 20.3 (68.5) | 20.9 (69.6) | 21.1 (70.0) | 21.1 (70.0) | 20.9 (69.6) | 20.7 (69.3) | 20.6 (69.1) |
| Mean daily minimum °C (°F) | 6.4 (43.5) | 6.6 (43.9) | 5.5 (41.9) | 3.2 (37.8) | 1.0 (33.8) | 1.0 (33.8) | 1.7 (35.1) | 2.5 (36.5) | 3.4 (38.1) | 3.7 (38.7) | 4.0 (39.2) | 5.3 (41.5) | 3.7 (38.7) |
| Average precipitation mm (inches) | 69.1 (2.72) | 82.4 (3.24) | 36.2 (1.43) | 1.9 (0.07) | 0.8 (0.03) | 0.5 (0.02) | 1.0 (0.04) | 1.0 (0.04) | 1.1 (0.04) | 0.4 (0.02) | 0.3 (0.01) | 12.4 (0.49) | 207.1 (8.15) |
Source: National Meteorology and Hydrology Service of Peru

Climate data for Chuapalca, Tarata, elevation 4,250 m (13,940 ft), (1991–2020)
| Month | Jan | Feb | Mar | Apr | May | Jun | Jul | Aug | Sep | Oct | Nov | Dec | Year |
|---|---|---|---|---|---|---|---|---|---|---|---|---|---|
| Mean daily maximum °C (°F) | 15.9 (60.6) | 15.7 (60.3) | 16.0 (60.8) | 16.0 (60.8) | 14.7 (58.5) | 14.1 (57.4) | 13.4 (56.1) | 14.8 (58.6) | 16.2 (61.2) | 17.6 (63.7) | 18.8 (65.8) | 18.1 (64.6) | 15.9 (60.7) |
| Mean daily minimum °C (°F) | −1.9 (28.6) | −1.3 (29.7) | −2.8 (27.0) | −6.9 (19.6) | −11.3 (11.7) | −13.5 (7.7) | −13.6 (7.5) | −13.3 (8.1) | −11.1 (12.0) | −9.7 (14.5) | −9.1 (15.6) | −5.0 (23.0) | −8.3 (17.1) |
| Average precipitation mm (inches) | 114.6 (4.51) | 109.4 (4.31) | 72.7 (2.86) | 18.7 (0.74) | 2.2 (0.09) | 1.7 (0.07) | 2.6 (0.10) | 3.5 (0.14) | 2.7 (0.11) | 7.3 (0.29) | 15.7 (0.62) | 61.9 (2.44) | 413 (16.28) |
Source: National Meteorology and Hydrology Service of Peru
