= Wila Qullu (Tarata) =

Mountain in Peru

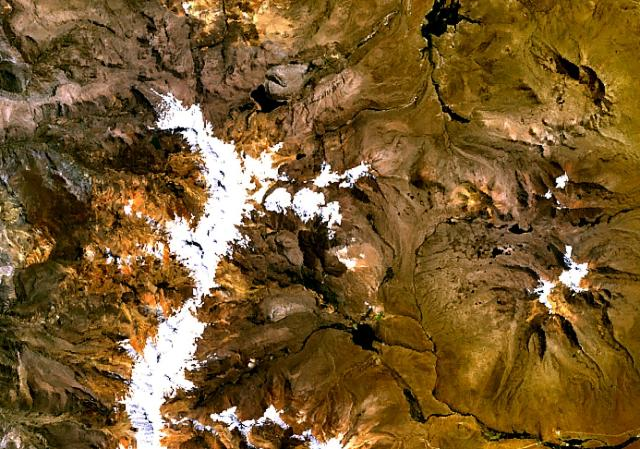
- Barroso mountain range (on the left) as seen from space (NASA Landsat) with Wila Qullu east of it (upper right)

Highest point
- Elevation: 5,000 m (16,000 ft)
- Coordinates: 17°25′15″S 69°41′36″W

Geography
- Location within Peru
- Location: Peru, Tacna Region, Tarata Province
- Parent range: Andes

Wila Qullu (Aymara wila blood, blood-red, qullu mountain, "red mountain", also spelled Vilacollo) is a mountain east of the Barroso mountain range in the Andes of Peru which reaches a height of approximately 5,000 metres (16,404 ft). It is located in the Tacna Region, Tarata Province, Tarata District. Wila Qullu lies west of Warawarani and northwest of Wiqu.
