= Phusnu Pullawi =

Mountain in Peru

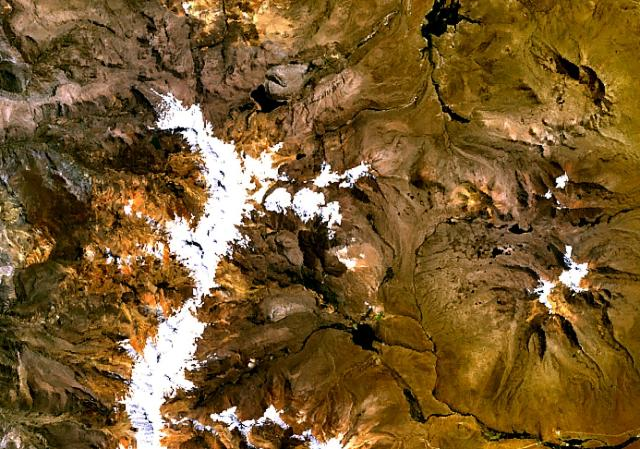
- Barroso mountain range (on the left) as seen from space (NASA Landsat) with Phusnu Pullawi in the northern extensions of the range

Highest point
- Elevation: 5,000 m (16,000 ft)
- Coordinates: 17°23′55″S 69°52′27″W

Geography
- Location within Peru
- Location: Peru, Tacna Region
- Parent range: Andes, Barroso mountain range

Phusnu Pullawi (Aymara phusnu chyme, pulla a kind of sheep, -wi a suffix, "a place with the chyme of sheep", also spelled Pusnupullave) is a mountain in the north of the Barroso mountain range in the Andes of Peru which reaches a height of approximately 4,200 m (13,800 ft). It is located in the Tacna Region, Tarata Province, Tarata District. Phusnu Pullawi lies southwest of Ch'uxñuma and northwest of Chunta Qullu and Pä Qullu.
