= Lluqu Qullu =

Mountain in Peru

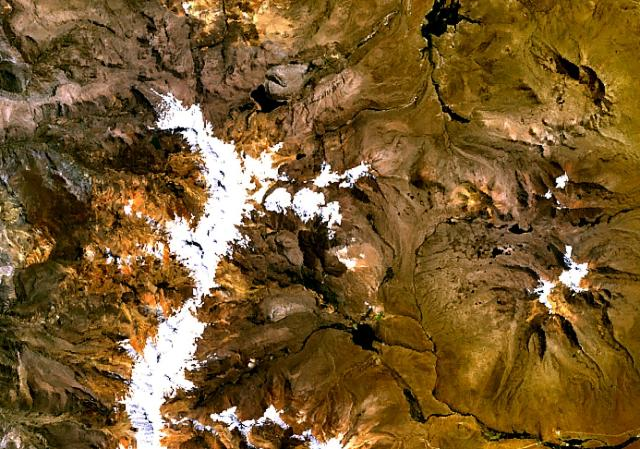
- Barroso mountain range (on the left) as seen from space (NASA Landsat). Lluqu Qullu is visible near the center of this image.

Highest point
- Elevation: 5,000 m (16,000 ft)
- Coordinates: 17°27′30″S 69°44′48″W

Geography
- Location within Peru
- Location: Peru, Tacna Region
- Parent range: Andes, Barroso

Lluqu Qullu (Aymara lluqu heart; calabaza, "heart mountain" or "calabaza mountain", Hispanicized spelling Llococollo) is a mountain in the Barroso mountain range in the Andes of Peru, about 5,000 m (16,000 ft) high. It is located in the Tacna Region, Tacna Province, Palca District, and in the Tarata Province, Tarata District.
