= Ticaco District =

District of Peru

Coordinates: 17.4445°S 70.0477°W

Ticaco
- District
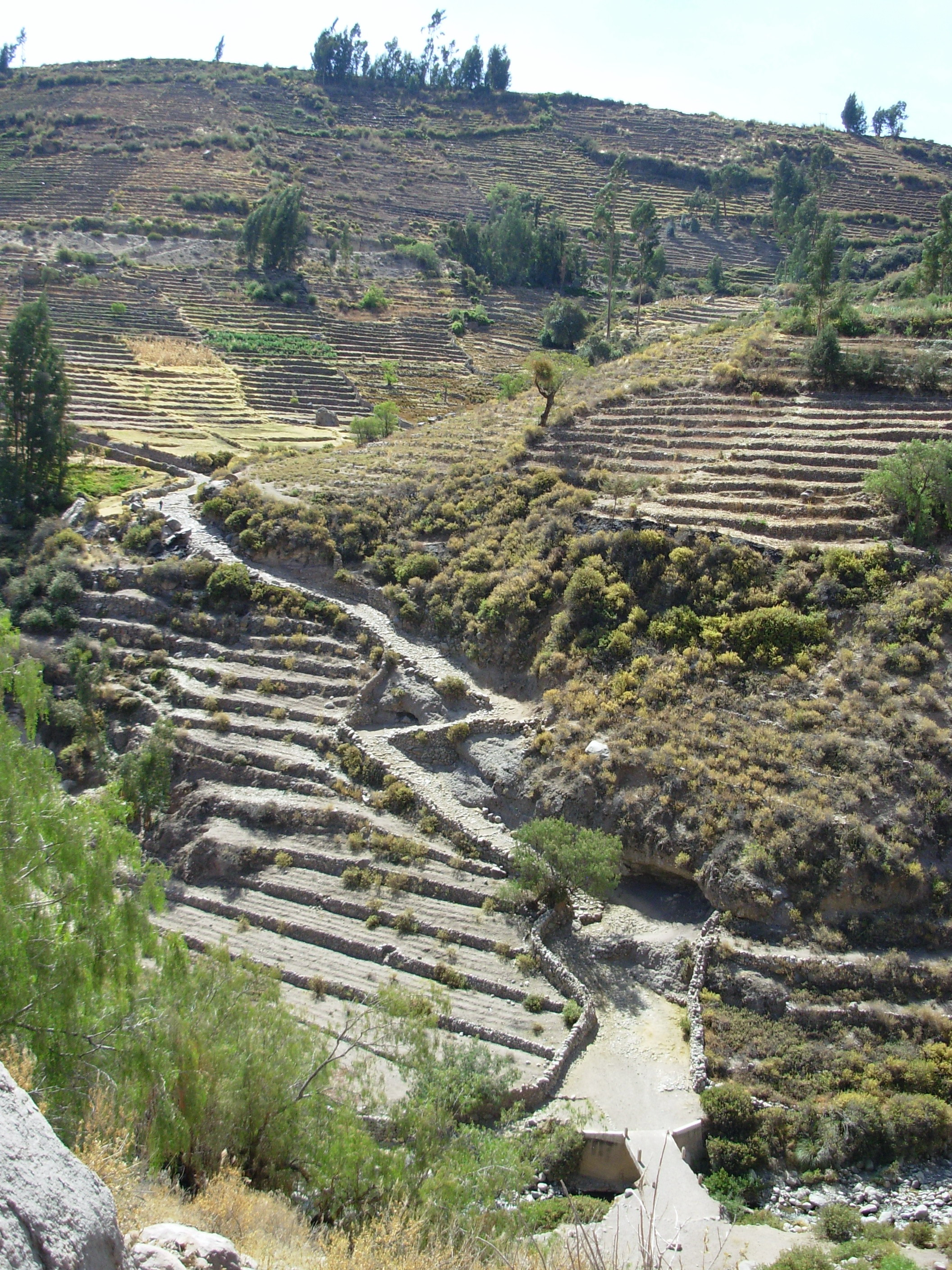
- Inca Trail and terraces in the district
- Interactive map of Ticaco
- Country: Peru
- Department: Tacna
- Province: Tarata
- Founded: November 12, 1874
- Capital: Ticaco

Government
  - Mayor: Noe Felix Soto Perez

Area
  - Total: 347.06 km^{2} (134.00 sq mi)
- Elevation: 3,277 m (10,751 ft)

Population (2005 census)
  - Total: 731
  - Density: 2.11/km^{2} (5.46/sq mi)
- Time zone: UTC-5 (PET)
- UBIGEO: 230408

Ticaco is a district of Tarata, a province of the department of Tacna, Peru. Its capital is Ticaco.

== History ==
During the Chilean occupation of the area it was a rural border residence. The Ticalaco River served as the border between Peru and Chile. During these years, Chile attempted to occupy the territory on several occasions, but failed due to the organized defense of the local residents.

== Geography ==
Some of the highest mountains of the district are listed below:

- Jach'a Sirka
- Jach'a T'aja Sirka
- Jaruma
- Jisk'a Qullu
- Phuru Phuruni
- P'isaqani
- Qutan Willk'i
- Timillu Qullu
- Titiri
- Yana K'achi
