= Jachatacasirca =

Mountain in Peru

- Location within Peru

Highest point
- Elevation: 4,870 m (15,980 ft)
- Coordinates: 17°18′26″S 70°00′43″W

Geography
- Location: Peru, Tacna Region, Tarata Province
- Parent range: Andes

Jachatacasirca (possibly from Aymara jach'a big, t'aja tousled, sirka vein of the body or a mine, "big tousled vein") is a 4,870-metre-high (15,980 ft) mountain in the Andes of southern Peru. It is situated in the Tacna Region, Tarata Province, on the border of the districts of Susapaya and Ticaco. Jachatacasirca lies northeast of Yanacachi.
