= Antajave =

Mountain in Peru

- Location within Peru

Highest point
- Elevation: 5,390 m (17,680 ft)
- Coordinates: 17°20′07″S 69°50′44″W

Geography
- Location: Peru, Tacna Region
- Parent range: Andes, Barroso

Antajave or Antajawi (possibly from Quechua anta copper and Aymara jawi wool or fleece of wool, also spelled Antajave) is a 5,390-metre-high (17,680 ft) mountain in the north of the Barroso mountain range in the Andes of southern Peru. It is situated in the Tacna Region, Tarata Province, Tarata District. It lies north of Incapachata and southeast of Purupuruni.
