= Tacna Department (Chile) =

Department of Chile (1884–1929)

Tacna
- Department of Chile
- 1884–1929
- Flag

- Capital: Tacna
- Demonym: Tacneño
- Historical era: War of the Pacific
  - Treaty of Ancón: 20 October 1883
  - Established: 31 October 1884
  - Treaty of Lima: 3 June 1929
  - Handover of Tacna: 28 August 1929
- Contained within
  - Province: Tacna
- Subdivisions
  - Type: Communes
  - Units: See list: Tacna; Palca; Sama
Preceded by	Succeeded by
Tacna province; Tarata province	Tacna province; Arica Department
- Today part of: Peru; Chile

Tacna (Spanish pronunciation: [ˈtaɣna]; Aymara and Quechua: Taqna) was a department of Tacna, a province of Chile. Located in the Atacama Desert, it existed between 1884 and 1929. Prior to its formal establishment, its area had already been de facto administered by the Chilean Army since 1880, following an eight month military campaign that took place during the War of the Pacific. Its capital was the city of Tacna.

The Treaty of Ancón, which put an end to the war, was signed on October 20, 1883. The following year, the province was formally created on October 31, incorporating the former Peruvian provinces of Tacna, Arica and Tarata, the latter of which would be constested due to differing interpretations of the course of the Sama River, the province's provisional northern border. Under the treaty, the territory would be administered by Chile for a ten-year period, after which a plebiscite would determine its fate. Originally meant to be held in 1894, was ultimately not carried out.

The dispute regarding Tacna and Arica continued into 1929, during which relations soured following the local acculturation policy of the Chilean government and the active campaigning by Peruvian locals. The dispute ended through the signing of the Treaty of Lima, under which Tacna would be returned to Peru, while Arica would be formally incorporated into Chile. The handover of Tacna took place at midnight on August 28, 1929, marking the end of the Chilean administration.

== Etymology ==
The province took its name from the Peruvian department of the same name. The term Tacna is derived from two Quechua words: Taka, meaning 'to hit', and na, which means 'place'. Thus, the full name means "I hit this place" or "I rule this place".

== History ==
The department was created alongside the province of the same name on October 31, 1884, replacing parts of the Peruvian provinces Tacna and Tarata, whose non-occupied parts were reorganised under a government based in Locumba.

=== Controversy over Tarata ===
In 1885, Chile integrated Tarata into the province, separating its territory into a department of its own in 1911. The Chilean government argued the town was to the east of the Sama River, a claim that Peru did not recognise on the grounds that the territory was completely unaffected by the Treaty of Ancón. Around this time, raids by Peruvian smugglers as well as soldiers took place in the region, and there were also claims of military escalation, including claims of Peruvian troops mobilizing near the Chilean border, which were denied by the Peruvian government.

In 1921, Chile abolished the department, and in 1925 gave back the city to Peru under the mediation of U.S. President Calvin Coolidge, who enforced the limits agreed upon on the north, which did not include the city. Coolidge showed himself to be in favor of the Peruvian claims on several occasions during the duration of the dispute, more so than other heads of state. Around the same time, a commission, headed by U.S. General John J. Pershing arrived to assist with the planned Tacna-Arica plebiscite, which eventually would never take place.

=== Incident at Challaviento ===
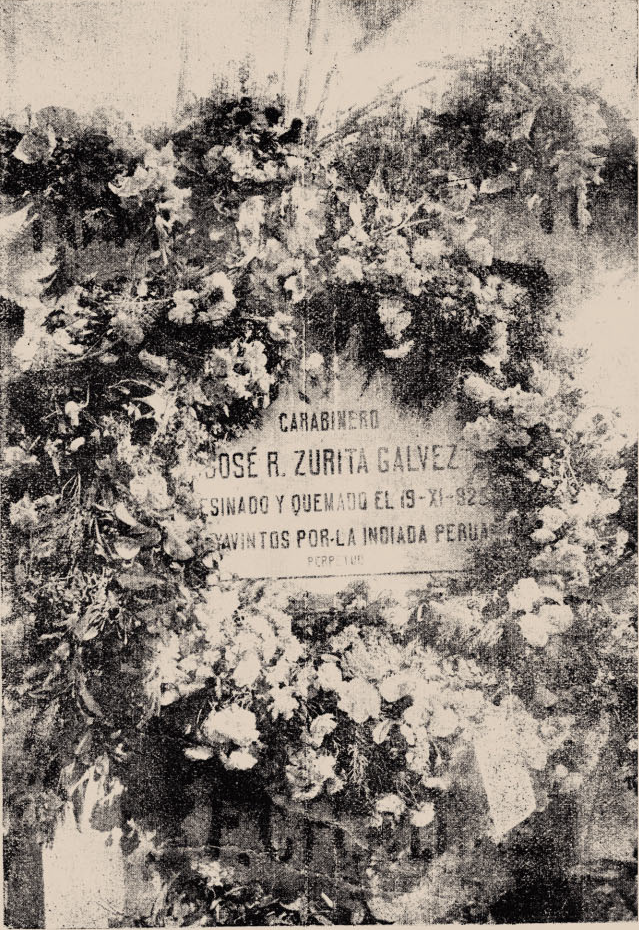
Photograph of Zurita's grave, then in Tacna, taken on November 1, 1927.

On November 19, 1925, three Carabineros de Chile were attacked by a Peruvian crowd in Challaviento, a small Aymara village located a few kilometres from Tarata. At the time, the town had been in charge of Carabineros José Zurita Gálvez, Domingo Sanhueza Aguillón and Filidor Urrutia Pincheira, who were headquartered at the town's barracks.

According to Peruvian historian Jorge Basadre, who was sent to Tarata as part of a commission to review local documents related to the event, the violent events unfolded following the rape of Andrea Vicente, an 18-year-old Aymara Indian and resident of the town. In response, a group of 50 armed locals headed by Florentino Apaza, a Bolivian who served as the village's spokesman, joined Roberto Velasco, Vicente's husband, in heading to confront Zurita, who was accused of being the perpetrator. The locals, according to the Peruvians, were tired of the abuses committed by the Chilean authorities, demanding that Zurita receive the death penalty. At 3:30 p.m., the group arrived to confront the Carabineros. A firefight ensued minutes later, with Apaza being killed.

The Chileans retreated to their barracks, where they were besieged for two hours, shooting at the Peruvians to dissuade any further approach to the building. To force them out, the building's rear side was set on fire, with the group forcing their way through the crowd to escape. Zurita and Urrutia were wounded in the attempt, while Sanhueza managed to escape thanks to the rough terrain surrounding the town. Urrutia survived the events, but Zurita was mutilated and his genitals were removed. Basadre claims that this took place following his death, while an autopsy carried out by Chilean forensic examiners determined that his death was not instantaneous and that "the mutilations [of both arms and the penis] were carried out while he was alive" as a form of reparation. The autopsy would be later refuted by a Peruvian expert on the subject.

Once the news reached him, Lieutenant-Colonel Luis Marchant González, commander-general of the Carabineros, sent a detachment commanded by Gavino Cavieres that arrived on the early hours of the 21st. The town was empty, with the exception of Zurita's body, and the barracks destroyed. At noon, a patrol found Sanhueza sleeping next to a cactus. Zurita's funeral was held on the 23rd, during which Marchant gave a speech denouncing the Peruvians and alluding to a claim that would be repeated in a report made by him, where he stated that the locals had been incited by the Peruvian Army through its members of the boundary commission, who had given them weapons.

Following the killings, the perpetrators fled to Tarata, alongside the rest of the town's inhabitants and those of the nearby villages of Palquilla, Atazpaca and Caplina. (Note: Challaviento's population consisted of 13 men, 16 women and 14 children. Palquilla's fleeing population consisted of 13 men, 8 women and 12 children, Atazpaca's consisted of 16 men, 12 women and 22 children, and Caplina's consisted of 8 men, 12 women and 22 children.) According to Basadre, the aforementioned population left for Tarata following abuses committed by Chilean law enforcement, who had reportedly increased their use of violence against locals following the handover of Tarata. Another ceremony commemorating the deceased was held in Tacna on November 1, 1927. The event has since been commemorated locally in Peru.

The incident had not been the first act of violence against the Carabineros, as member Francisco Lobos Riquelme had been killed by assailants from Peru who attacked the detachment at the Mauri River, near Chilicolpa, at the border with Puno on January 6, 1923.

=== Plebiscitary violence ===
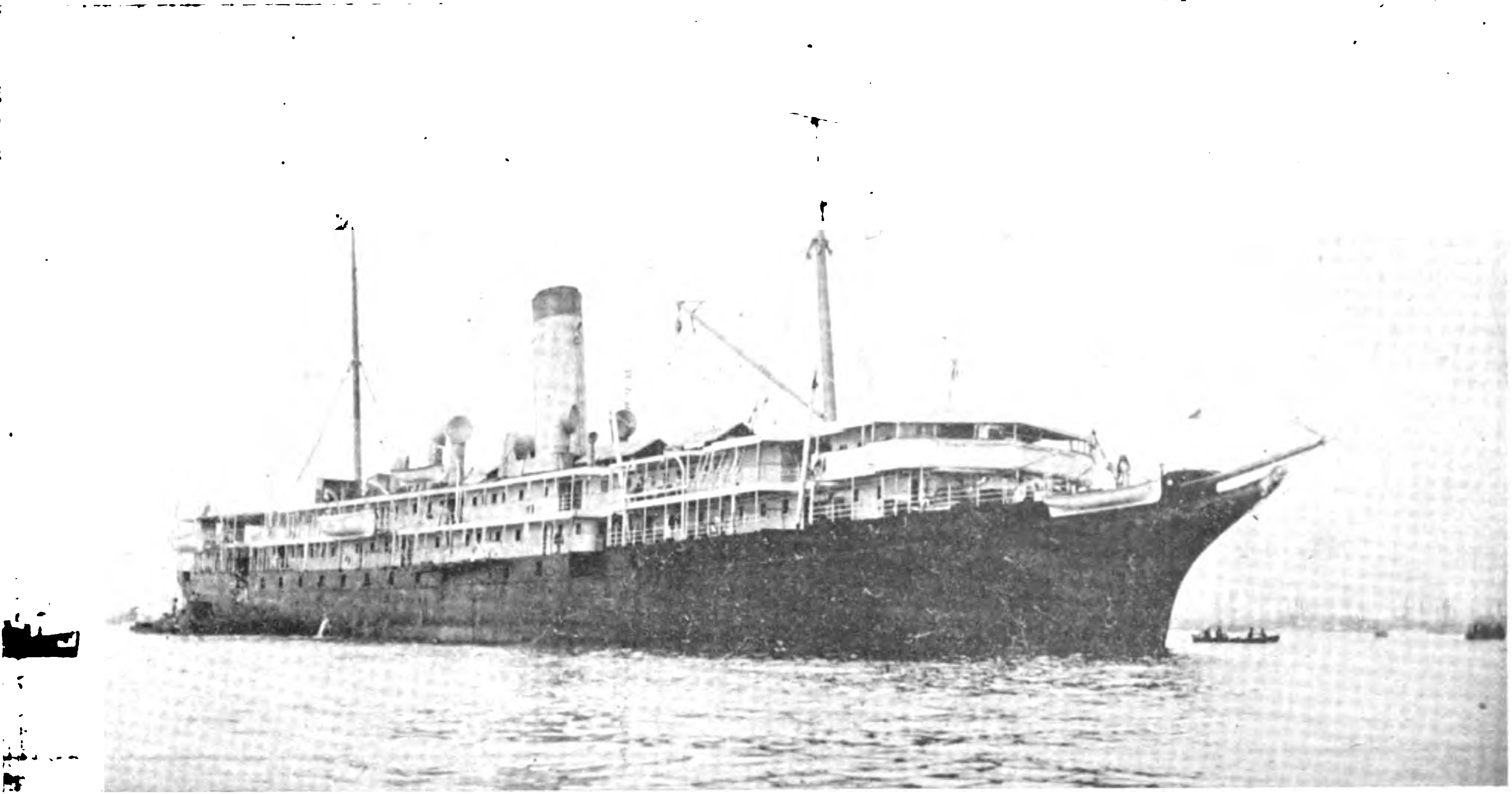
The Peruvian steamer Ucayali, base of the Peruvian plebiscitary delegation.

A plebiscitary commission operated from August 1925 to June 1926, based in the port city of Arica. The Peruvians were headquartered at the steamer Ucayali, from where La Voz del Sur (a supplementary newspaper of La Prensa) was also edited. The Americans were headquartered at the USS Rochester, and the Chileans at the O'Higgins and Condell ships of the Chilean Navy. Violent incidents increased again in 1926 due to the incoming plebiscite, which took place in the context of renewed plebiscitary campaigns by both countries.

On January 9, 1926, thirty Peruvians were attacked by a mob of over 200 Chileans in Tacna, with the Peruvian press denouncing that the events took place in front of twelve Chilean policemen. On the 27th of the same month, the regulatory document for the plebiscite was approved, which included measures hostile to Chilean interests. On March 5, the pro-Peruvian committee for plebiscitary propaganda organised its first parade through the city's streets, which included the flying of Peruvian flags and the intonation of the National Anthem of Peru. The parade was attacked, leaving 75 injured, and succeeded by a Chilean parade, where no such incidents were recorded. El Pacífico, a local Chilean newspaper, denounced alongside the Chilean press that the confrontations took place in a context of constant anti-Chilean aggression, where the province was subject to artificial immigration, intentional provocation and Peruvian propagandising that painted Chileans as savages who attacked the defenceless Peruvians, a version of events to which the U.S. plebiscitary authorities were subscribed.

On March 8, Peru proposed that the plebiscite be posponed, which was ratified by the American delegation a few days later.

=== Reincorporation to Peru ===
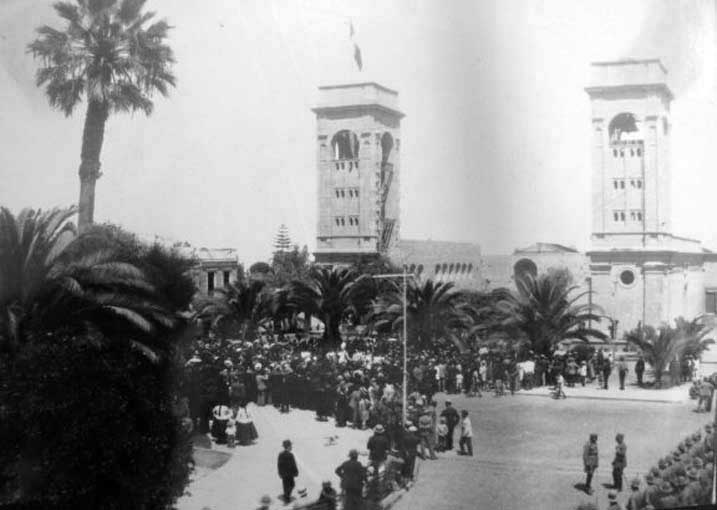
Tacna Cathedral during the events.

On 3 June 1929, the Treaty of Lima was signed by then Peruvian Representative Pedro José Rada y Gamio and Chilean Representative Emiliano Figueroa Larrain, leading to the effective return of Tacna to Peru at midnight, on 28 August 1929, creating the Department of Tacna, and Arica being integrated into Tarapacá Province, ending the existence of the Chilean Province of Tacna.

The handover had no official ceremony, with some Chilean officials temporarily staying behind to assist Peru regarding the new administration. Nevertheless, the return of the territory was met with celebrations in Peru, with President Augusto B. Leguía overseeing a military parade in Lima, and church bells ringing in celebration. Some Chilean citizens who had remained following the handover asked to be repatriated.

== Geography ==
The department's limits were defined as the Sama River to the north, the Arica Department to the south, the Andes mountain range to the east, and the Pacific Ocean to the west.

== Politics ==
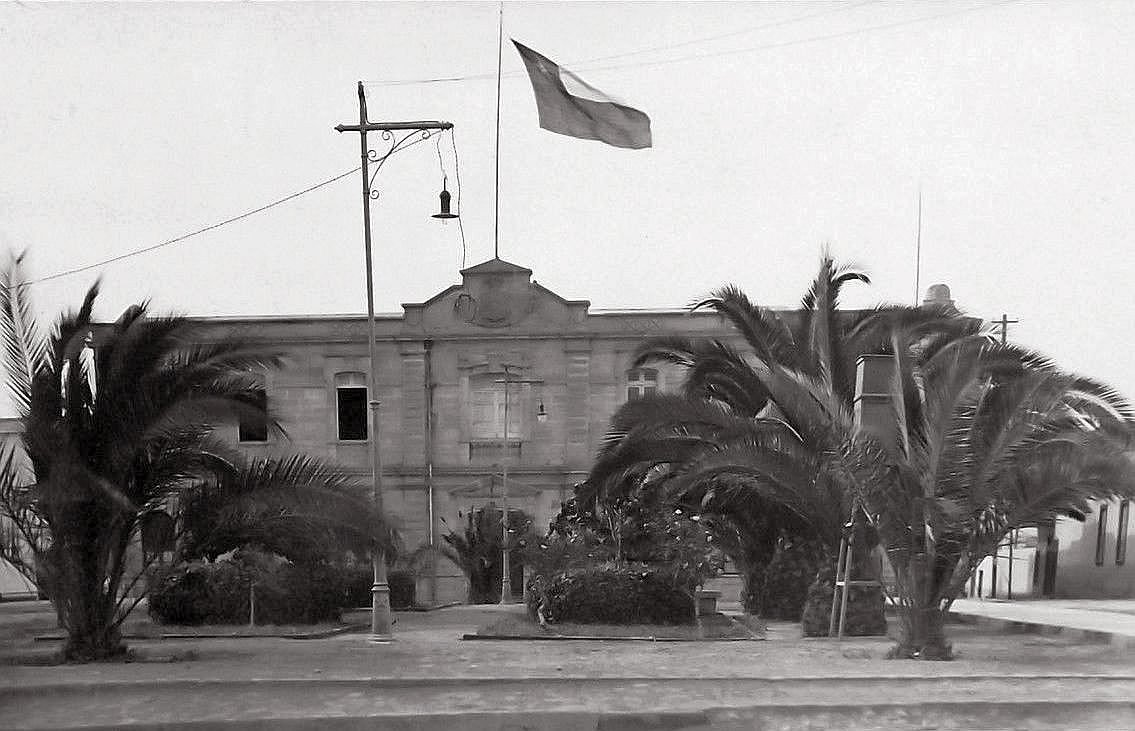
Tacna Prefecture in 1920.

The department was administered by the Municipality of Tacna, headquartered at the city of the same name, where the Departmental Government, and the Provincial Intendancy were located.

=== Subdivisions ===
With the Decree of Creation of Municipalities of December 22, 1891, the following municipalities were created with their headquarters and whose territories are the sub-delegations detailed below:

Municipality	Sub-delegations
Tacna; Tacna	El Callao
Tacna; Tacna	San Ramón
Tacna; Tacna	El Mercado
Tacna; Tacna	El Alto del Lima
Tarata (1891–1925); Tarata	Pocollai
Tarata (1891–1925); Tarata	Pachía
Tarata (1891–1925); Tarata	Palca
Tarata (1891–1925); Tarata	Tarata
Tarata (1891–1925); Tarata	Sama
Tarata (1891–1925); Tarata	Calana

On September 1, 1925, the Tarata sub-delegation returned to Peru. In 1927 the composition of the department was modified and in 1928 the new sub-delegations and communes were defined, which came into force the same year.

== See also ==
- Treaty of Ancón
- Tacna Province (Chile)
