= Sitajara District =

Coordinates: 17.3754°S 70.1339°W

Sitajara
- District
- Interactive map of Sitajara
- Country: Peru
- Region: Tacna
- Province: Tarata
- Founded: November 7, 1955
- Capital: Sitajara

Government
  - Mayor: Angel Custodio Argandoña Chambi

Area
  - Total: 251.24 km^{2} (97.00 sq mi)
- Elevation: 3,150 m (10,330 ft)

Population (2005 census)
  - Total: 337
  - Density: 1.34/km^{2} (3.47/sq mi)
- Time zone: UTC-5 (PET)
- UBIGEO: 230405

Sitajara District is one of eight districts of the province Tarata in Peru.
