= Tacna Province (Chile) =

Former province of Chile

Tacna
- Province of Chile
- 1883–1929
- Flag

- Capital: Tacna
- Demonym: Tacneño, a
- Population
  - 1903: 3,000
- Historical era: War of the Pacific
  - Treaty of Ancón: 20 October 1883
  - Established: 31 October 1884
  - Treaty of Lima: 3 June 1929
  - Handover of Tacna: 28 August 1929
- Subdivisions
  - Type: Departments
  - Units: See list: Arica; Tacna; Tarata (1911–1921)
| Preceded by | Succeeded by |
| Tacna Department | Tacna Department; Tarapacá Province |
- Today part of: Peru; Chile

Tacna (Spanish pronunciation: [ˈtaɣna]; Aymara and Quechua: Taqna) was a province of Chile. Located in the country's northernmost coast, it existed between 1884 and 1929. Prior to its formal establishment, its area had already been de facto administered by the Chilean Army since 1880, following an eight month military campaign that took place during the War of the Pacific. Its capital was the city of Tacna.

The Treaty of Ancón, which put an end to the war, was signed on October 20, 1883. The following year, the province was formally created on October 31, incorporating the former Peruvian provinces of Tacna, Arica and Tarata, the latter of which would be constested due to differing interpretations of the course of the Sama River, the province's provisional northern border. Under the treaty, the territory would be administered by Chile for a ten-year period, after which a plebiscite would determine its fate. Originally meant to be held in 1894, was ultimately not carried out.

The dispute regarding Tacna and Arica continued into 1929, during which relations soured following the local acculturation policy of the Chilean government and the active campaigning by Peruvian locals. The dispute ended through the signing of the Treaty of Lima, under which Tacna would be returned to Peru, while Arica would be formally incorporated into Chile. The handover of Tacna took place at midnight on August 28, 1929, marking the end of the Chilean administration.

== Etymology ==
The province took its name from the Peruvian department of the same name. The term Tacna is derived from two Quechua words: Taka, meaning 'to hit', and na, which means 'place'. Thus, the full name means "I hit this place" or "I rule this place".

The term "captive provinces" (provincias cautivas) was used by Peru under the presidency of Augusto B. Leguía to refer to the provinces of Tacna and Arica, which were administered by Chile as departments of its province. Following the signing of the Treaty of Lima in 1929, the term ceased to be used. It was briefly revived by Juan Velasco Alvarado, who had planned to retake the territory by force.

Another name used by Peru was that of "unredeemed Tacna" (Tacna irredenta), in contrast to "Free Tacna" (Spanish: Tacna libre), the official denomination for the area of the department under Peruvian control.

== History ==
Map of the dispute and its resolution.

Prior to its formal establishment, its area had already been de facto administered by the Chilean Army since 1880, following an eight month military campaign that took place during the War of the Pacific. It became part of its Apostolic Vicariate of Tarapacá (later known as the Diocese of Iquique from December 1929 onwards), which became independent from the diocese of Arequipa in 1882.

The province was first established on 31 October 1884, by a law promulgated by President Domingo Santa María which defined its limits as the Sama River to the north, the Quebrada de Camarones to the south, the Andes mountain range to the east, and the Pacific Ocean to the west. This was under the conditions of the Treaty of Ancón, by means of which Chile achieved dominion over the Peruvian department of Tarapacá, and possession of the provinces of Tacna and Arica for a decade, after which a plebiscite was to be held in 1894 to determine the region's sovereignty, however, it was never carried out. The provisional legal organization would end up working for 50 years, until 1929.

During its early years, resistance was at its peak, with some Peruvian military personnel organizing guerrillas, such as Gregorio Albarracín's, of about a hundred men, which were defeated in battle in 1882, with Albarracín and his son being killed in action.

On 26 December 1908, half of Arica was destroyed by an earthquake. The city, as well as the region, were similarly affected by the much stronger earthquake in Valparaíso that happened just a couple of months prior, as well as its aftershocks.

=== Controversy over Tarata ===
In 1885 Chile integrated Tarata into the province, becoming in 1911 the Tarata Department, under the pretext that the town was to the east of the Sama river. Peru, however, did not recognize this annexation on the grounds that the territory was completely unaffected by the Treaty of Ancón. Around this time, raids by Peruvian smugglers as well as soldiers took place in the region, and there were also rumours of war, including unfounded claims of Peru mobilizing troops against the Chilean border, which were denied on more than one occasion. In 1921, however, Chile abolished the department, and in 1925, amid plebiscite-related protests, gave the city back to Peru under the mediation of U.S. President Calvin Coolidge, who enforced the limits agreed upon on the north, which did not include the city. Coolidge showed himself to be in favor of the Peruvian claims on several occasions during the duration of the dispute, more so than other heads of state. Around the same time, a commission, headed by U.S. General John J. Pershing arrived to assist with the planned Tacna-Arica plebiscite, which eventually would never take place. Francisco Tudela y Varela became involved in the issue during his time serving as foreign minister from 1917 to 1918.

On 23 April 1921, measles in epidemic form was reported in the province, as well as neighboring Antofagasta, occurring among troops. At the same time, smallpox was reported present.

=== Plebiscitary efforts ===
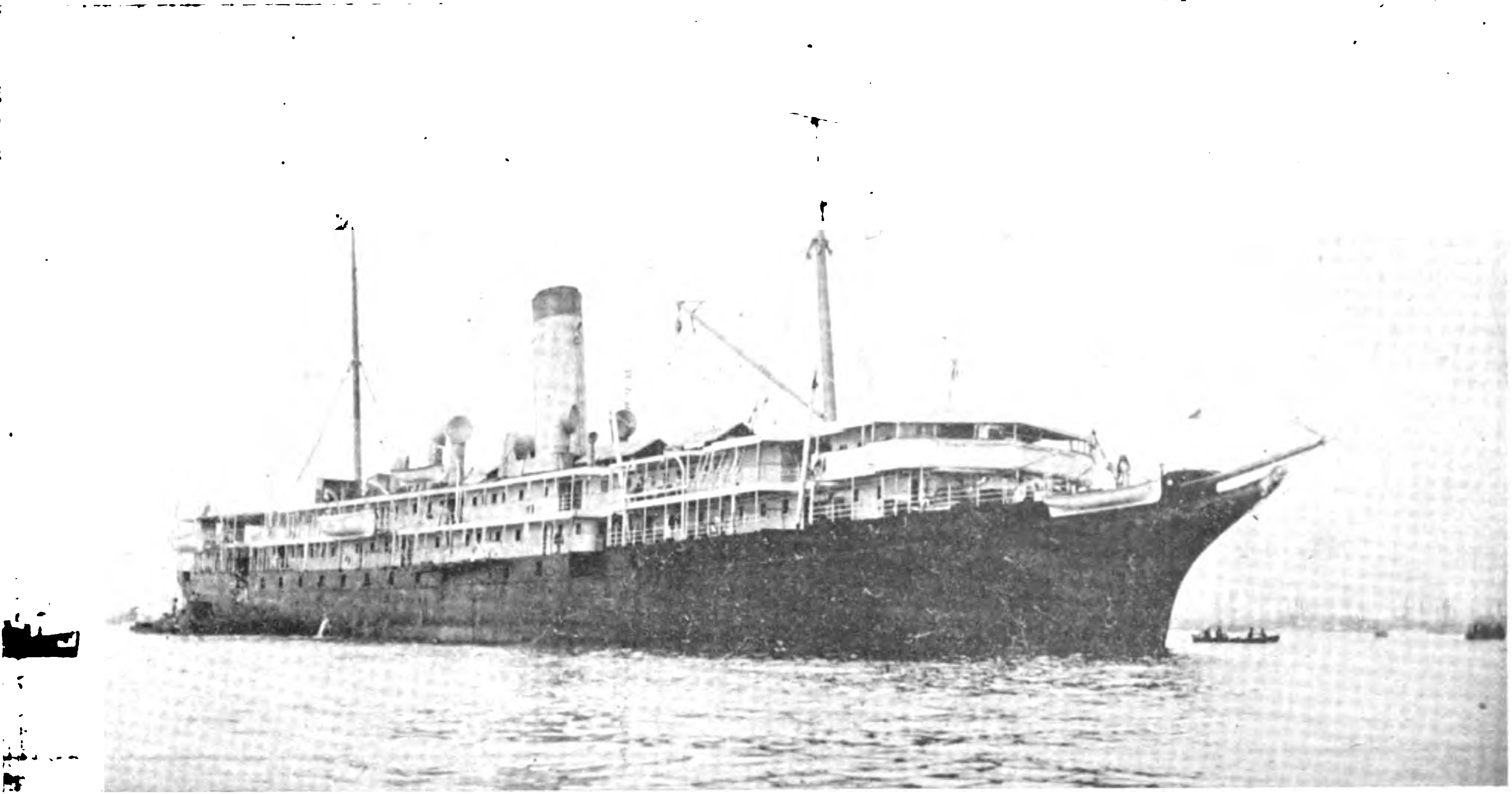
The Peruvian steamer Ucayali.

A plebiscitary commission operated from August 1925 to June 1926, based in the port city of Arica. The Peruvians were headquartered at the steamer Ucayali, from where La Voz del Sur (a supplementary newspaper of La Prensa) was also edited. The Americans were headquartered at the USS Rochester, and the Chileans at the O'Higgins and Condell ships of the Chilean Navy. Violent incidents increased again in 1926 due to the incoming plebiscite, which took place in the context of renewed plebiscitary campaigns by both countries. On March 8, Peru proposed that the plebiscite be posponed, which was ratified by the American delegation a few days later.

=== Reincorporation to Peru ===
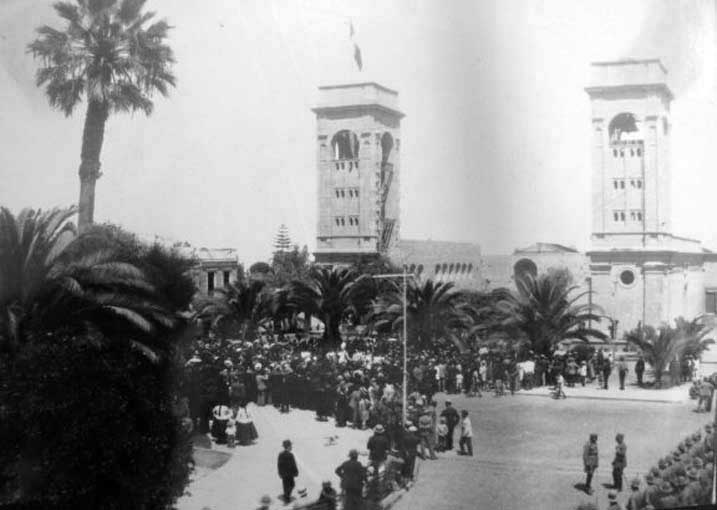
Tacna Cathedral during the events.

On 3 June 1929, the Treaty of Lima was signed by then Peruvian Representative Pedro José Rada y Gamio and Chilean Representative Emiliano Figueroa Larrain, leading to the effective return of Tacna to Peru at midnight, on 28 August 1929, creating the Department of Tacna, and Arica being integrated into Tarapacá Province, ending the existence of the Chilean Province of Tacna.

The handover had no official ceremony, with some Chilean officials temporarily staying behind to assist Peru regarding the new administration. Nevertheless, the return of the territory was met with celebrations in Peru, with President Augusto B. Leguía overseeing a military parade in Lima, and church bells ringing in celebration. Some Chilean citizens who had remained following the handover asked to be repatriated.

== Politics ==
At the time, the provinces were Chile's first-level administrative division, each administered by an intendant. For this reason, Tacna was headed by intendants following its period of military administration, with the exception of colonel Arrate and lieutenant colonel Beytía, who did not serve under this title. The intendant's seat was located in the city of Tacna.

=== List of intendants ===
| Name | Term | |
| Name | Begin | End |
|---|---|---|
| Manuel José Soffía | January 26, 1884 (Note: The Province of Tacna was created in October 1884, for which Soffia previously held the position as political chief and general commander of arms.) | August 1886 |
| Alejandro Fierro | December 1, 1886 | October 14, 1888 |
| Zenón Freire | March 1890 | November 12, 1890 |
| Guillermo Blest Gana | November 12, 1890 | April 2, 1891 |
| Col. Miguel Arrate | April 2, 1891 | April 6, 1891 |
| Ramón E. Vega | April 1891 | September 1891 |
| Liborio Manterola | September 1891 | October 1891 |
| Antonio Edwards | October 1891 | September 29, 1894 |
| Vicente Prieto Puelma | January 1895 | December 15, 1897 |
| Rafael Puelma | January 26, 1898 | February 28, 1898 |
| Lt. Col. David Beytía | February 28, 1898 | August 26, 1898 |
| Manuel Francisco Palacios | August 26, 1898 | September 13, 1901 |
| Antonio Subercaseaux | October 25, 1901 | January 1904 |
| Máximo R. Lira | January 1904 | December 31, 1912 |
| Eduardo Orrego Ovalle | April 21, 1913 | August 7, 1918 |
| Fernando Edwards G. | July 8, 1918 | February 24, 1921 |
| Luis Barceló Lira | February 24, 1921 | ? |
| Gonzalo Robles Rodríguez | June 20, 1929 | August 28, 1929 |

=== Subdivisions ===
The province was divided into three departments, themselves divided into communes:

- Arica (Arica)
- Tacna (Tacna)
- Tarata (Tarata)

Of these departments, Tarata served as a contentious point of the dispute due to disagreements over the provisional boundary. The towns of Tarata and Ticaco were affected by the overlapping claims, with the Ticalaco, a tributary of the Sama River, serving as the de facto boundary. Additionally, another dispute affected the area of Chilcaya (or Surire), which Chile considered to be under the administration of Tarapacá Province, while Peru considered it to be part of its province of Arica.

== Demographics ==
According to a 1904 estimate of the Peruvian government, which included the non-occupied area of its department, the region had 30,000 inhabitants at the time. In 1913, the province Arica had 10,420 inhabitants. When the province ceased to exist in 1929, a Peruvian community remained in Arica.

=== Education ===
The Liceo de Tacna operated in the city of the same name during this period. Salvador Allende, who would later serve as president of Chile, studied at the school.

=== Notable people ===
- Salvador Allende Gossens, Chilean politician and president from 1970 to 1973. He and his family lived in Tacna from 1909 to 1916.
- Jorge Basadre Grohmann, Peruvian historian known for his extensive publications about the independent history of his country.
- Jorge Flores Torres, Peruvian general and politician.
- Federico Hurtado Alcázar, Peruvian general and politician.
- Arturo Jiménez Borja, Peruvian physician, ethnologist, painter and writer.
- José Jiménez Borja, Peruvian linguist, critic and educator.
- Roberto MacLean y Estenós, Peruvian sociologist, lawyer and politician.
- Lautaro Murúa Herrera, Chilean–Argentinian actor, film director and screenwriter.
- Victorio Pescio Vargas, Chilean lawyer and jurist.
- Olga Poblete y Poblete, Chilean feminist, historian, educator and academic.
- Gastón Pons Muzzo, Peruvian chemist and educator.
- Gustavo Pons Muzzo, Peruvian historian and educator.
- Luis Valente Rossi, Chilean mathematician, educator and Communist politician.
- Ida Vivado Orsini, Chilean pianist and composer.
- Roberto Wachholtz Araya, Chilean engineer and politician.

== Culture ==
The Government of Chile pursued a policy of assimilation known as chileanization, which was met with local resistance, as well as criticism from the Peruvian government, who withdrew their delegations in 1901, and, after re-establishing it in 1905, withdrew it again in 1910 as a response to the closure of Peruvian institutions as well as the expulsion of Peruvians "whose influence would contribute to the maintenance of the Peruvian national spirit."

== Gallery ==
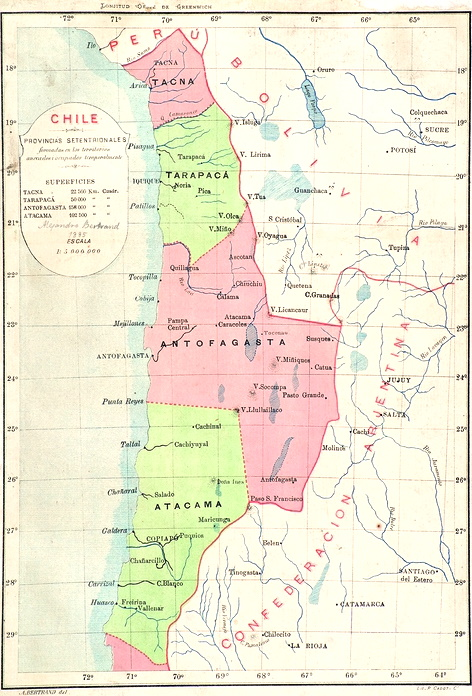
Map of Chile's Norte Grande, 1885

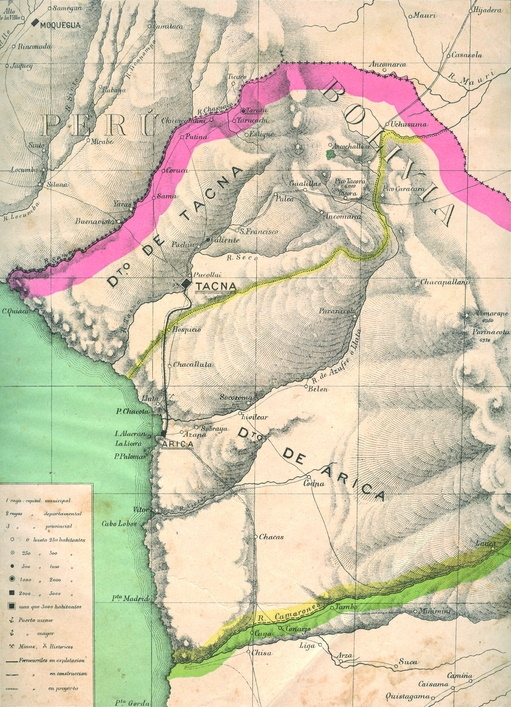
Departments of Tacna and Arica, Chile, 1895

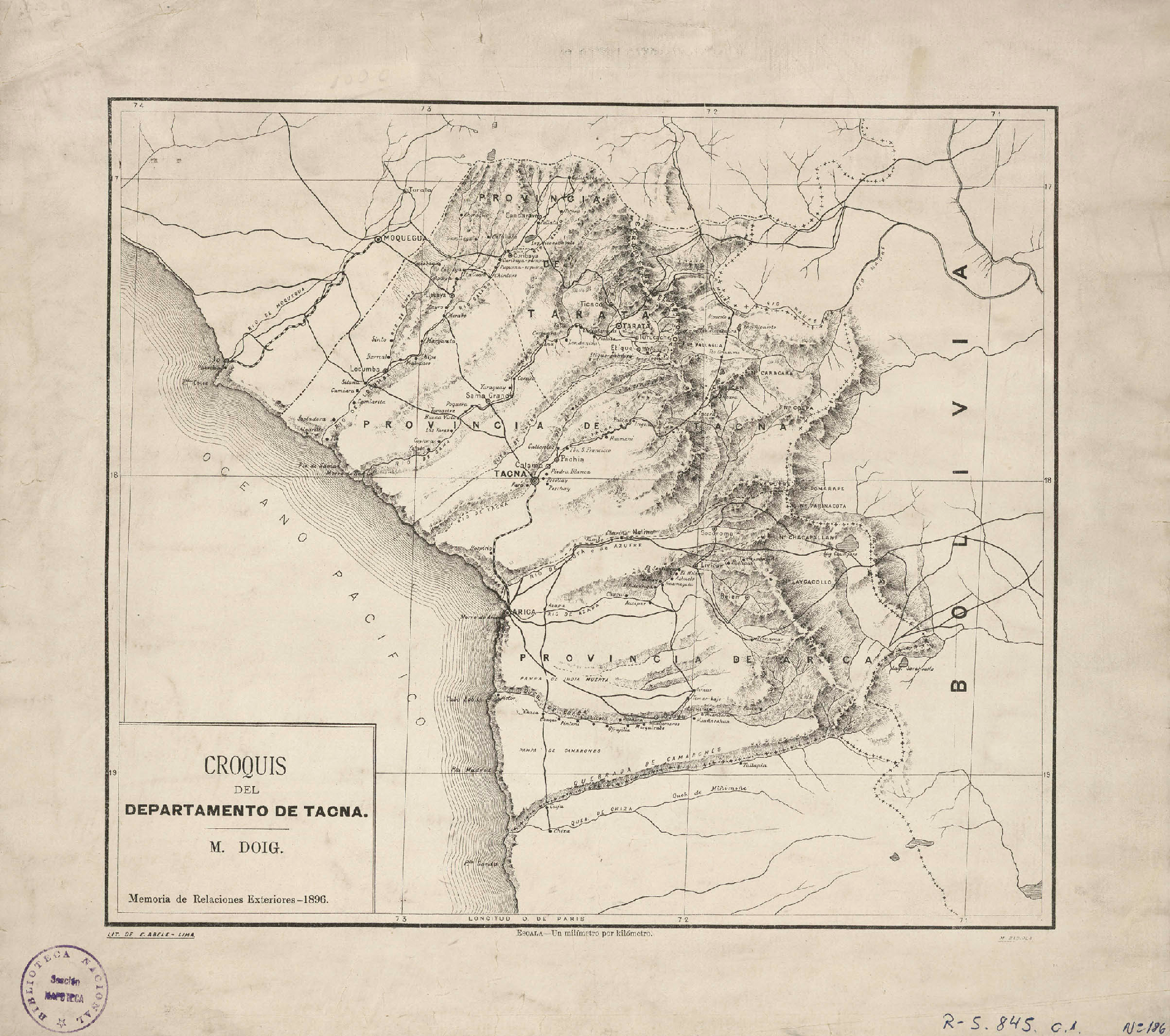
Peruvian de jure map from 1896

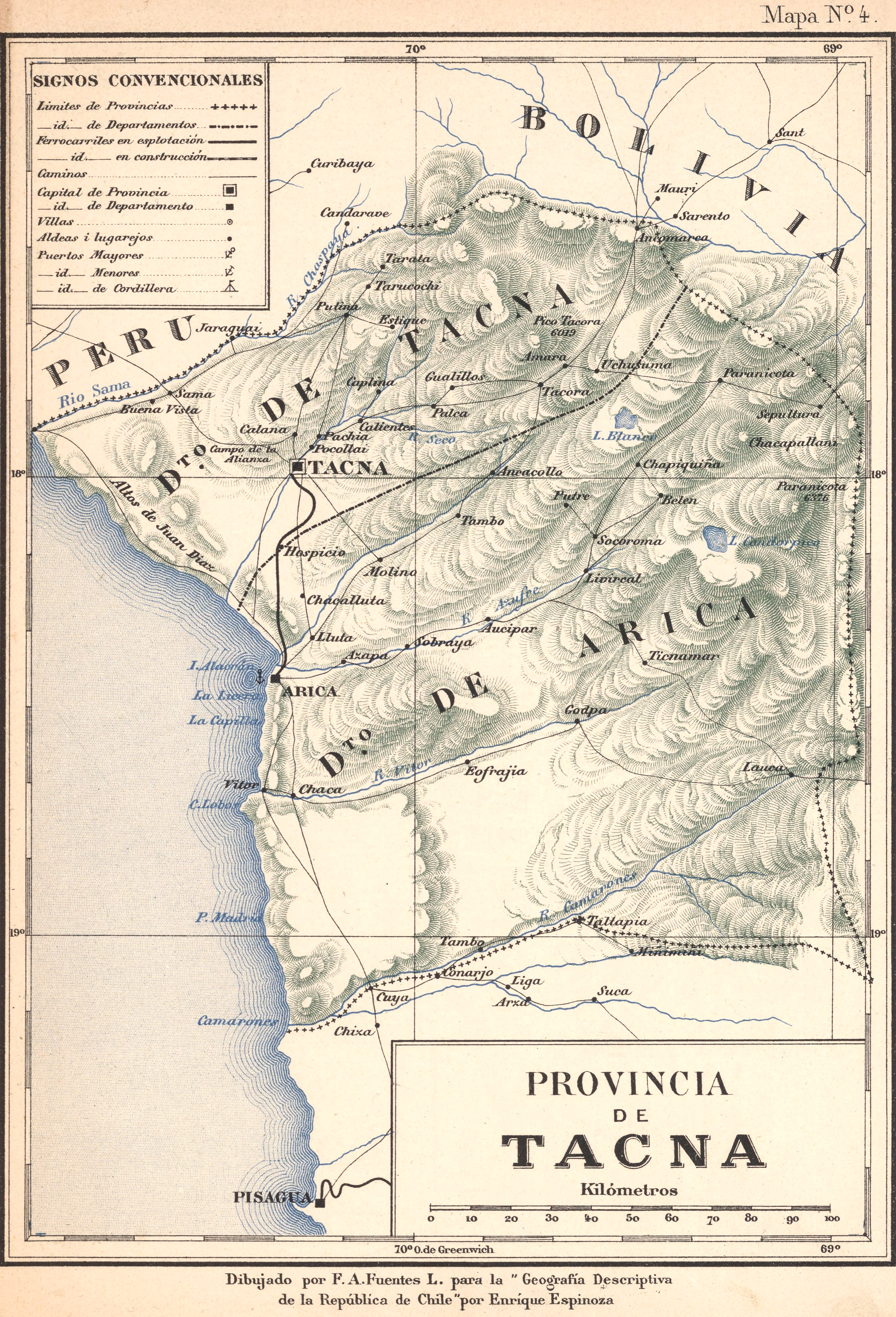
1895 map, part of the "Geografía descriptiva de Chile" collection.

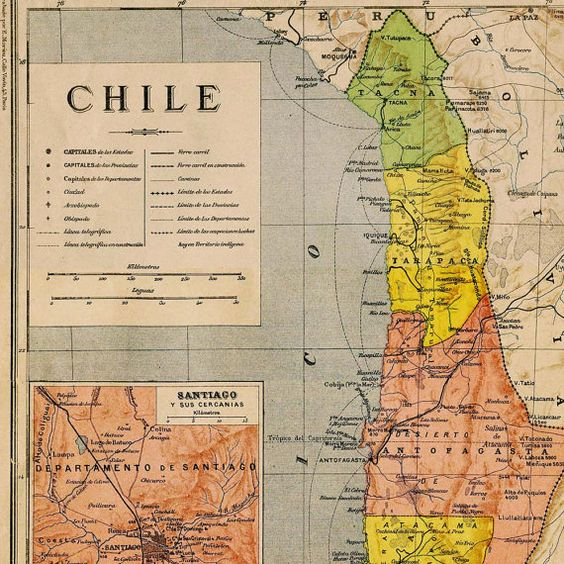
Map of Chile's Norte Grande, 1897

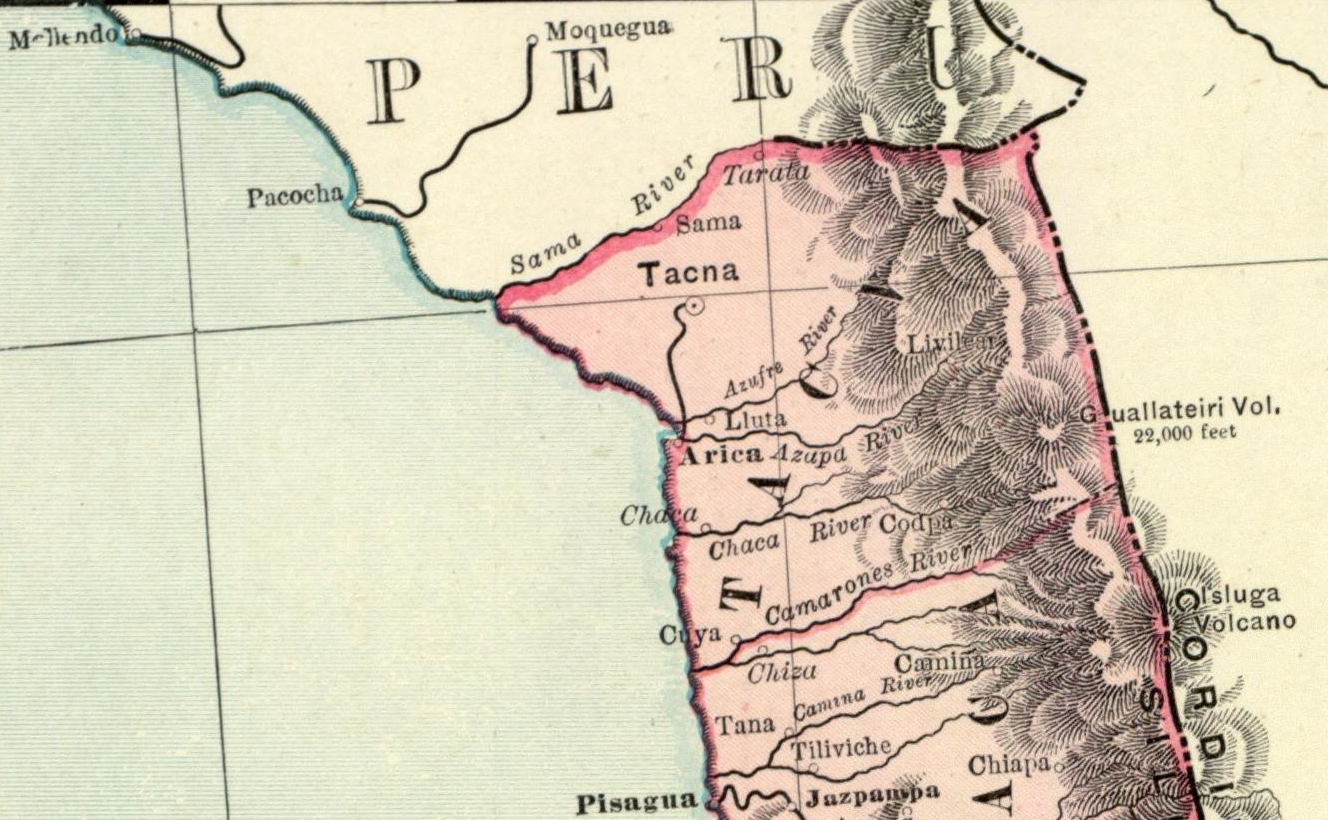
Map of the Province of Tacna, Chile, 1897

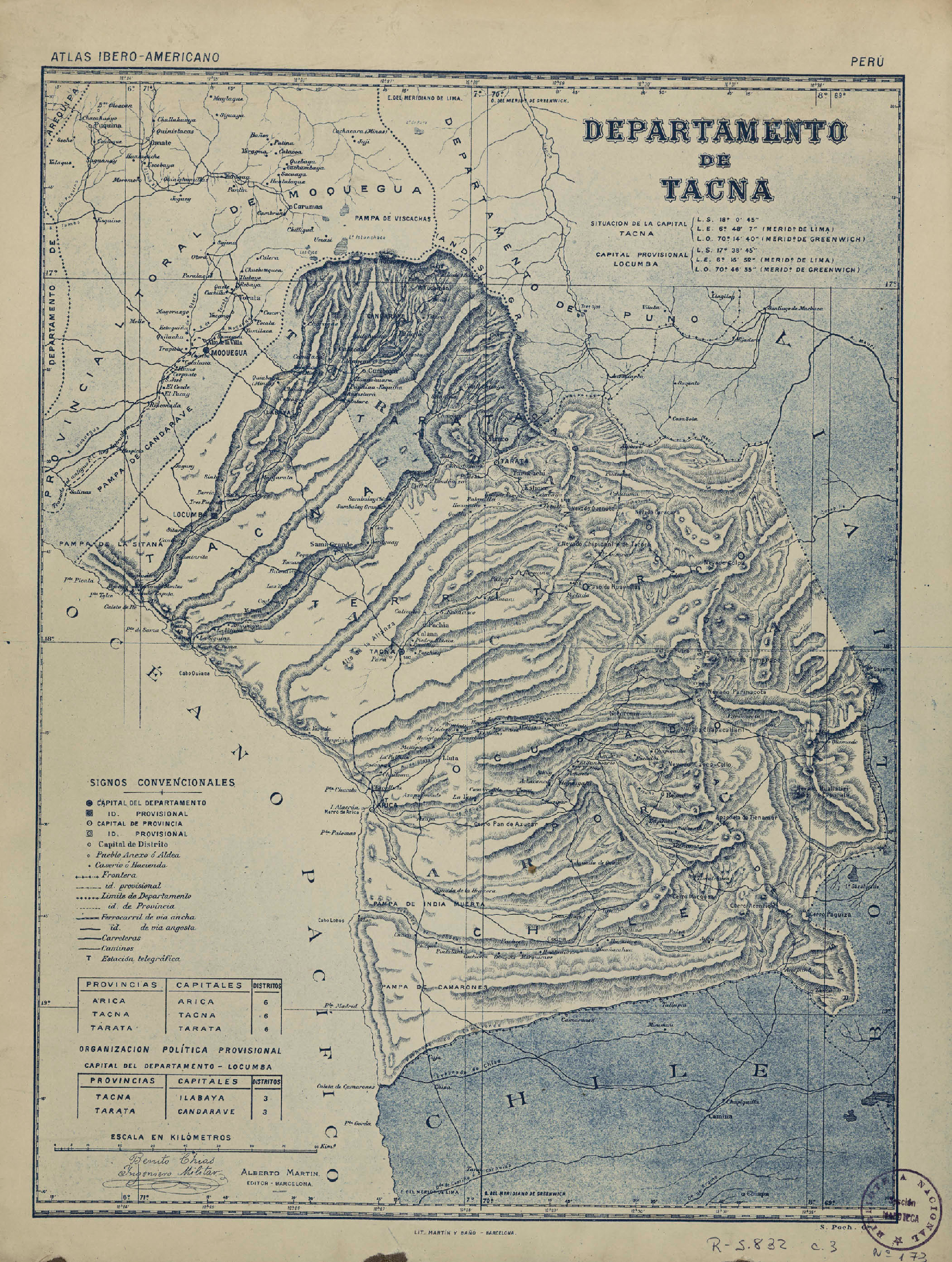
Peruvian de jure map from 1900 (under the concept of "captive province")

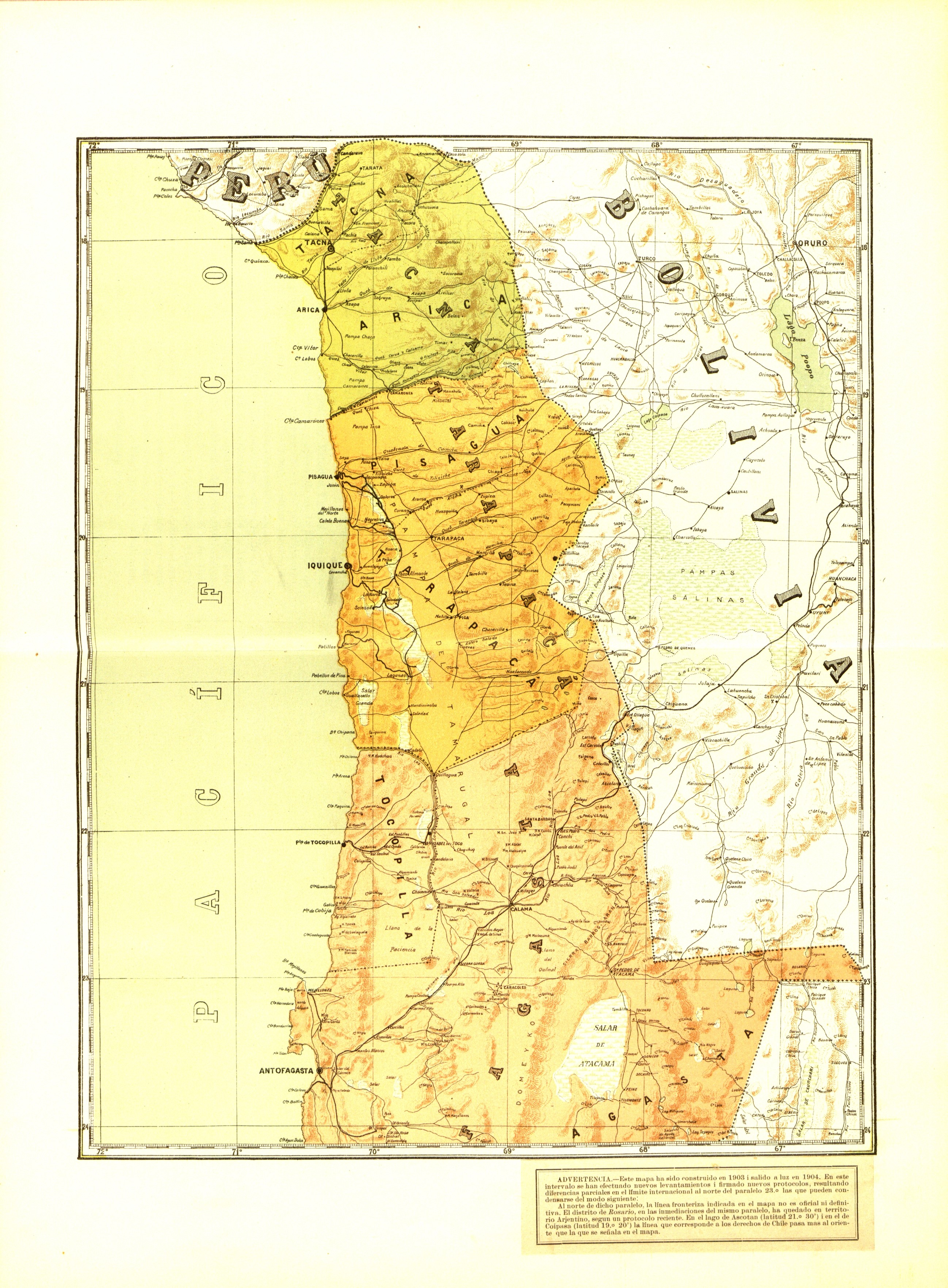
Map of Chile's Norte Grande, 1904

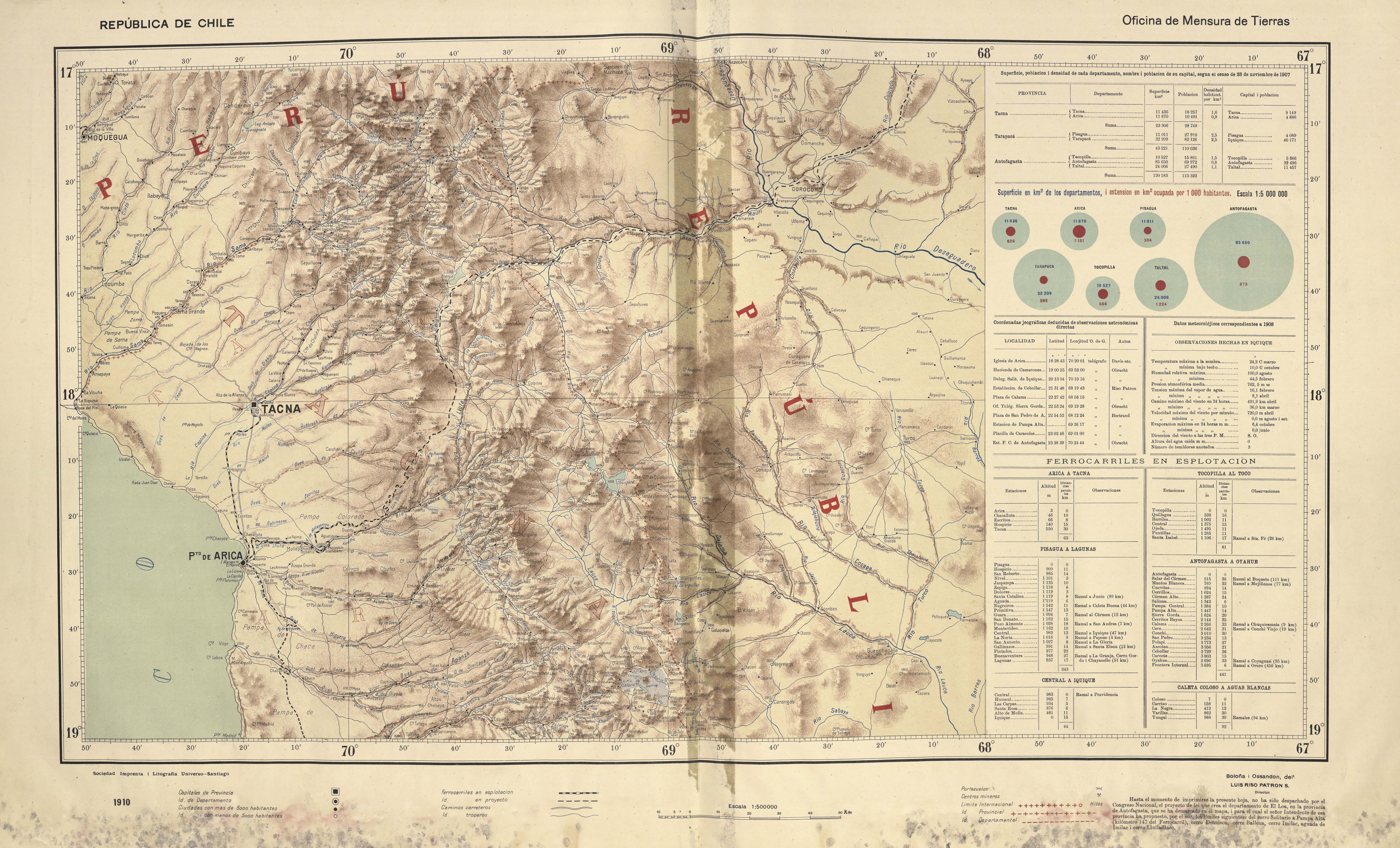
Map of the Province of Tacna, Chile, 1910

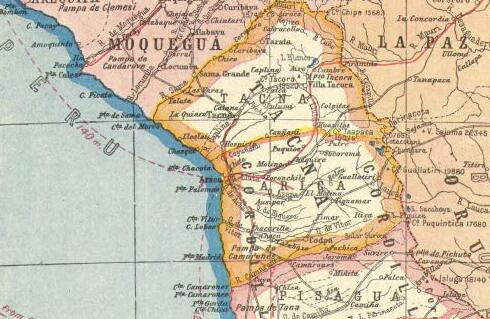
Map of the Province of Tacna, Chile, 1920

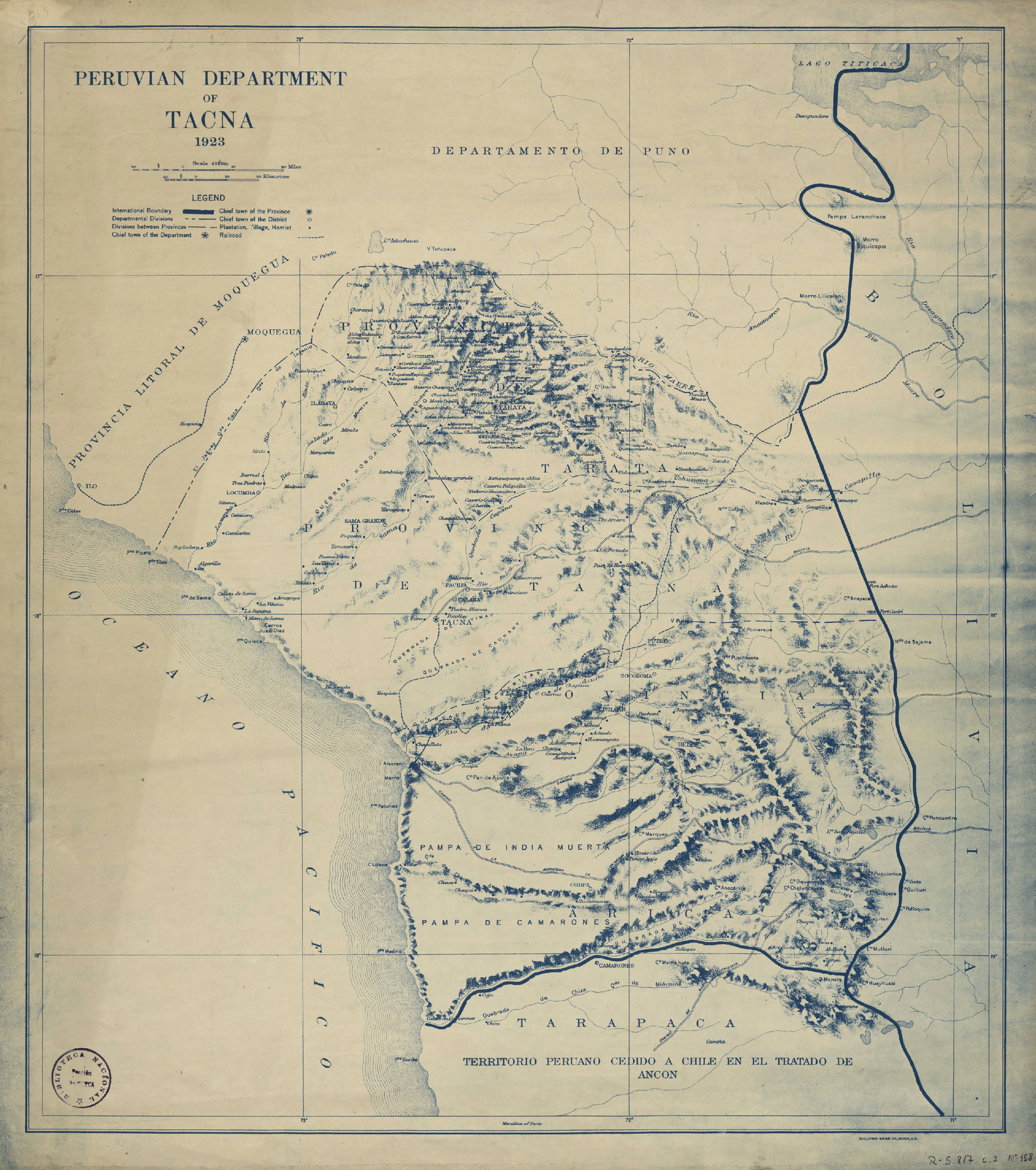
Peruvian de jure map from 1923

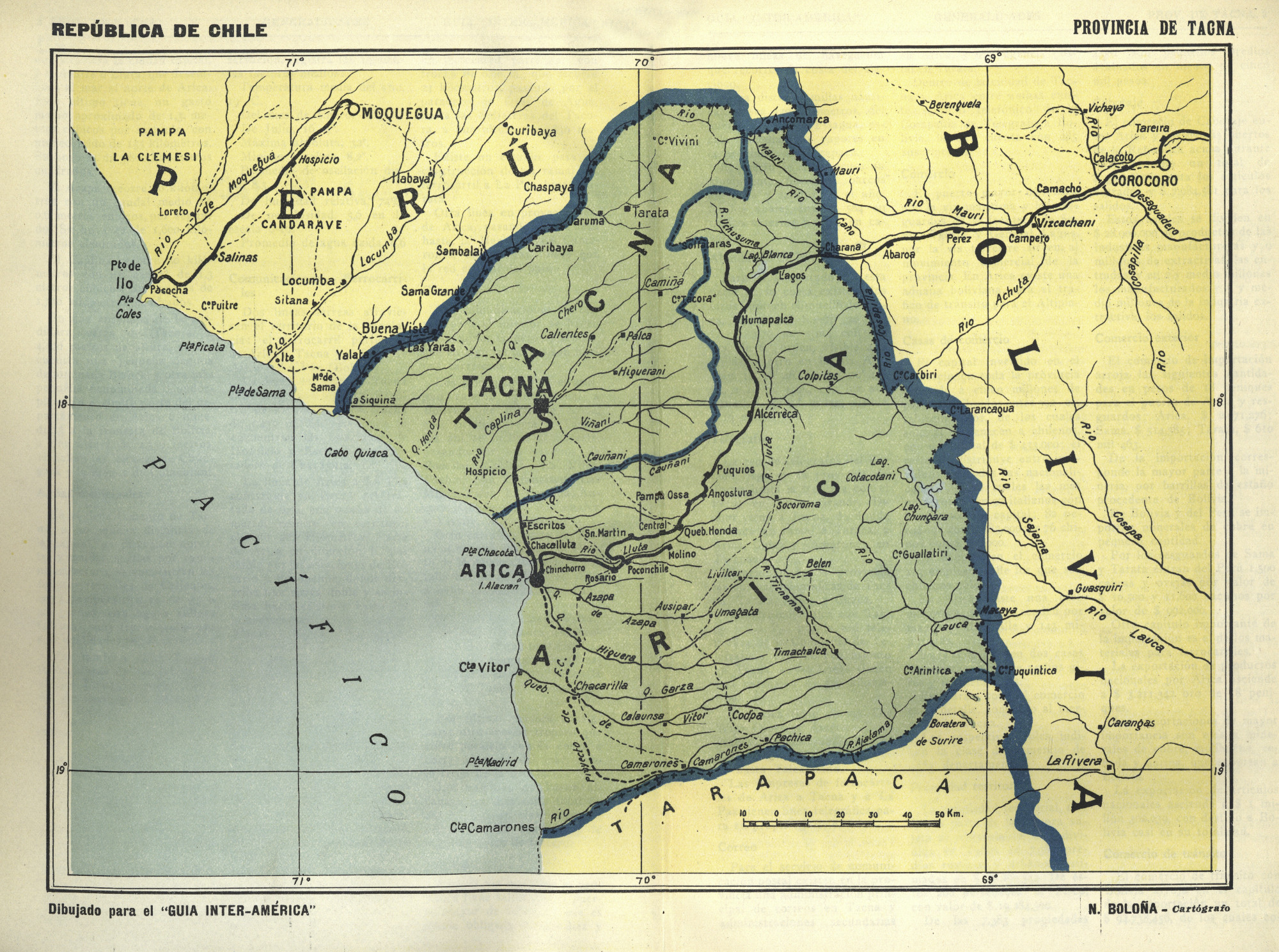
Map of the Province of Tacna, Chile, 1923

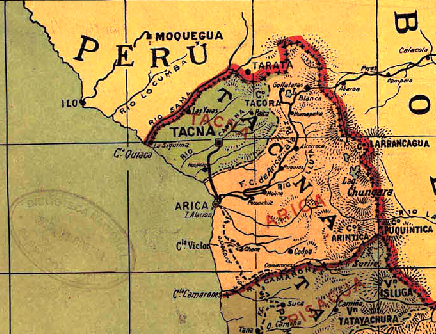
Map of the Province of Tacna, Chile, 1929

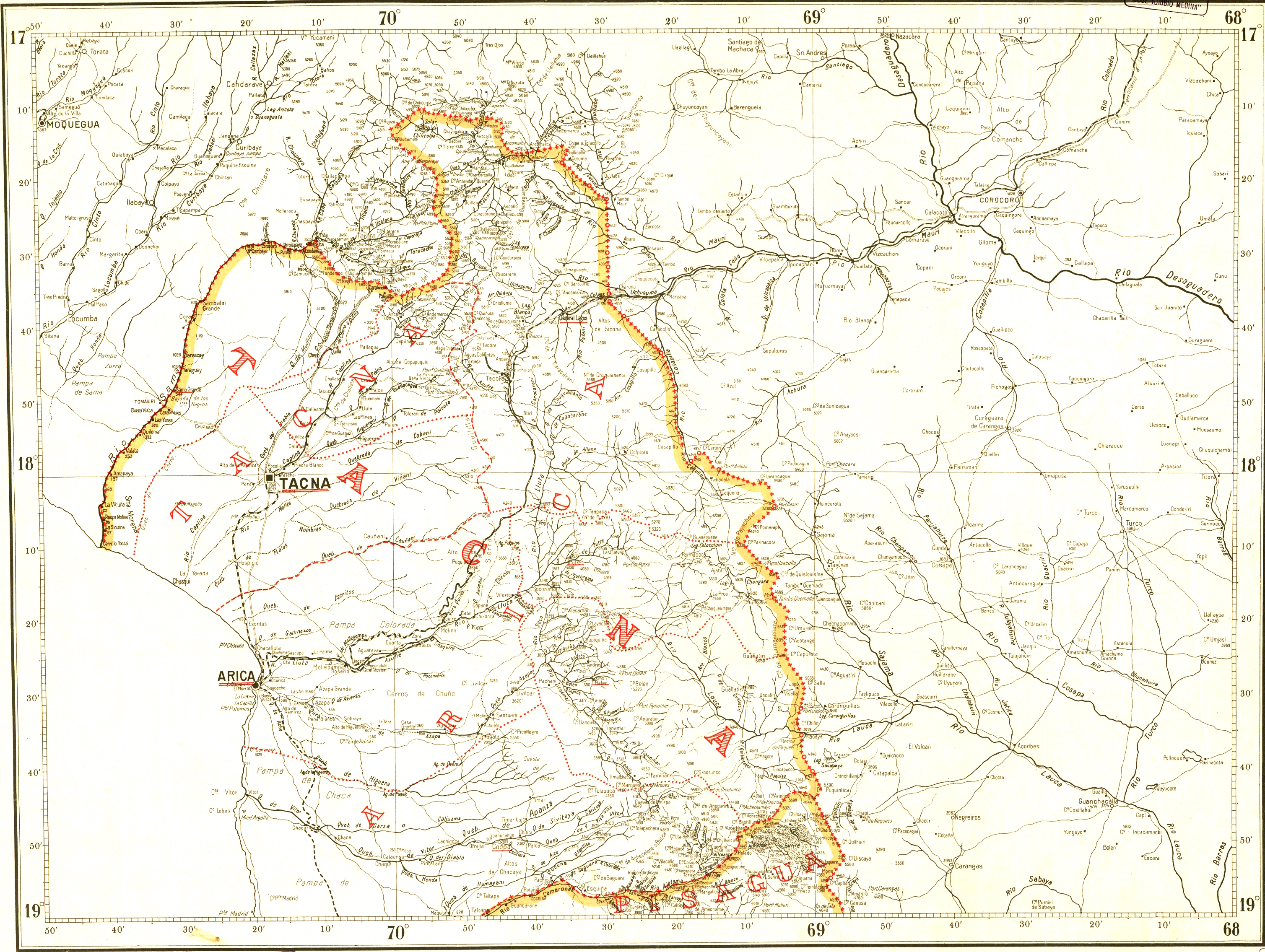
Map of the Province of Tacna, Chile, 1929

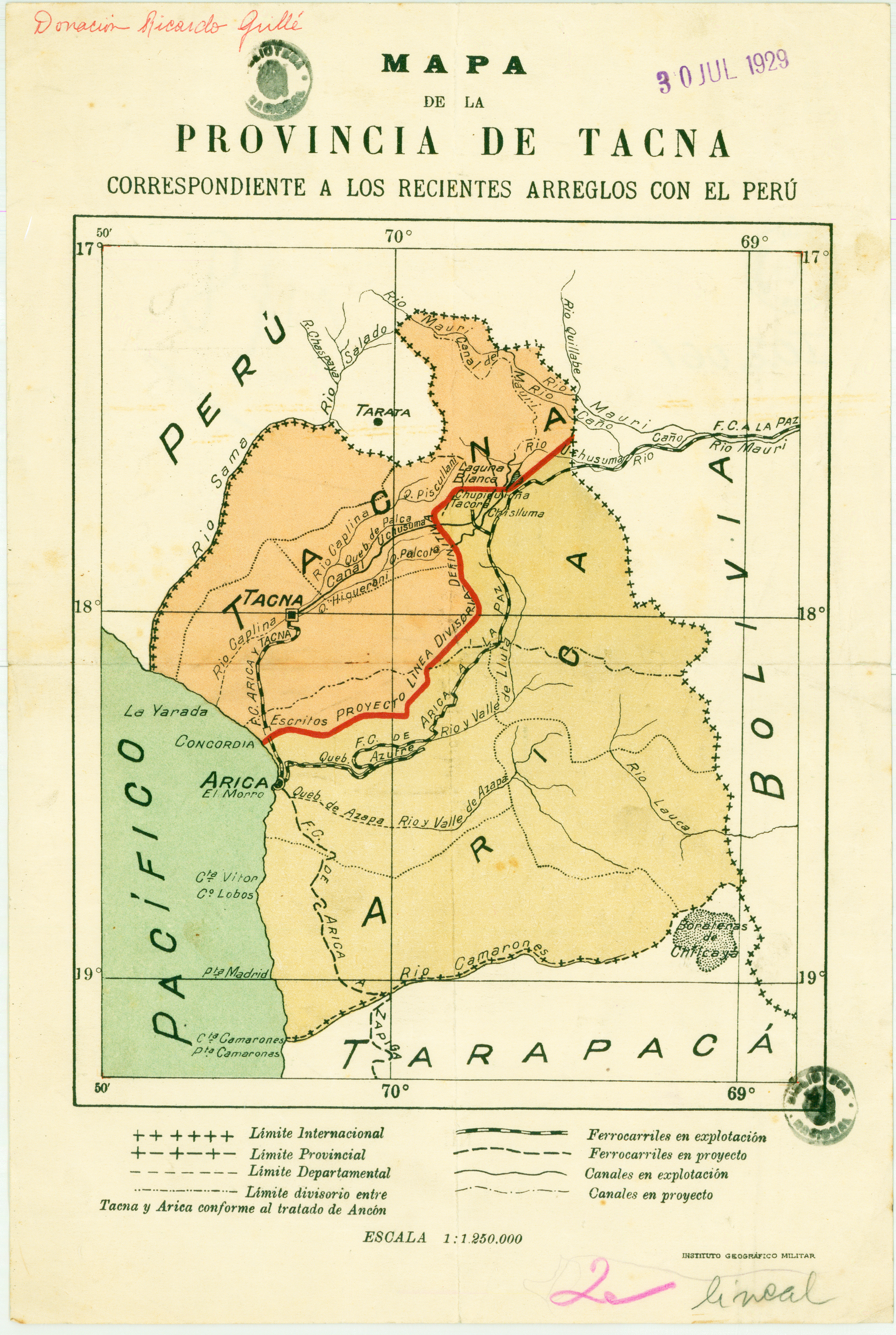
Map showing territorial changes under the Treaty of Lima, 1929

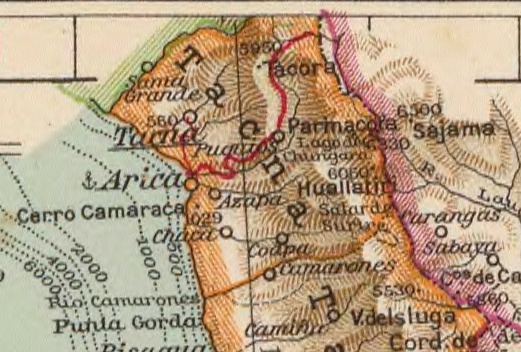
Map of the Province of Tacna, Chile, 1929

== See also ==
- War of the Pacific
- Chilenization of Tacna, Arica and Tarapacá
- Litoral Department
