= Estique-Pampa District =

Coordinates: 17.5388°S 70.0317°W

Estique-Pampa
- District
- Interactive map of Estique-Pampa
- Country: Peru
- Region: Tacna
- Province: Tarata
- Founded: January 12, 1956
- Capital: Estique-Pampa

Government
  - Mayor: Cesario Flores Vicente

Area
  - Total: 185.61 km^{2} (71.66 sq mi)
- Elevation: 3,050 m (10,010 ft)

Population (2005 census)
  - Total: 108
  - Density: 0.582/km^{2} (1.51/sq mi)
- Time zone: UTC-5 (PET)
- UBIGEO: 230404

Estique-Pampa District is one of eight districts of the province Tarata in Peru.
