= Pisacani =

Mountain in Peru

- Location within Peru

Highest point
- Elevation: 5,424.8 m (17,798 ft)
- Coordinates: 17°16′36.5″S 69°56′17″W

Geography
- Location: Peru, Tacna Region, Tarata Province
- Parent range: Andes

Pisacani or P'isaqani (Aymara p'isaqa Nothoprocta (a kind of bird), -ni a suffix to indicate ownership, "the one with the p'isaqa", also spelled Pisacani, Pisarane, Pisarone) is a mountain in the Andes of southern Peru, about 5,424.8 metres (17,798 ft) high. It is situated in the Tacna Region, Tarata Province, Ticaco District.

Pisacani (P'isaqani) is also the name of a village northeast of the mountain.

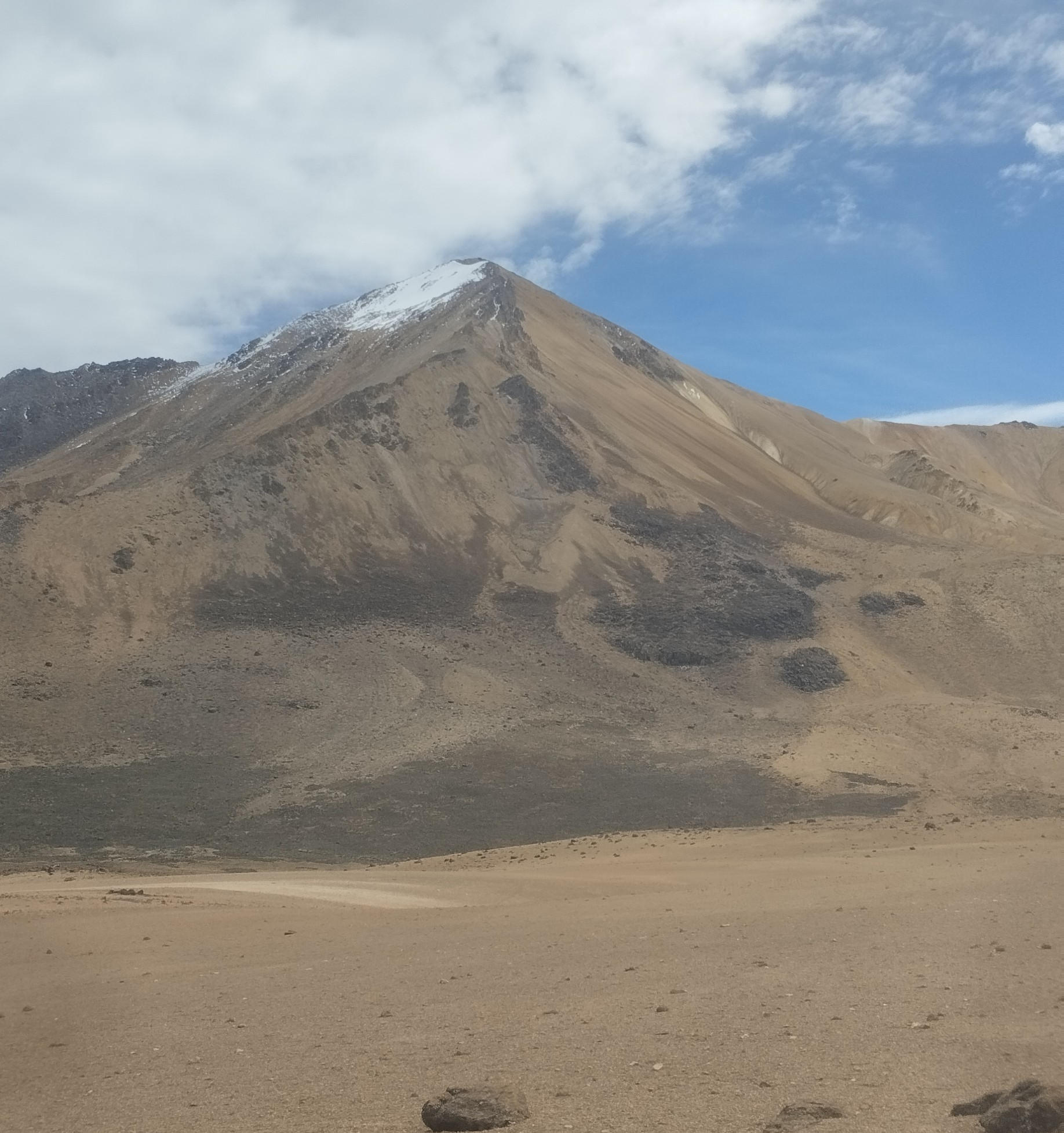
View from the south east of the summit of the Piscani.
