= Chucñuma =

Mountain in Peru

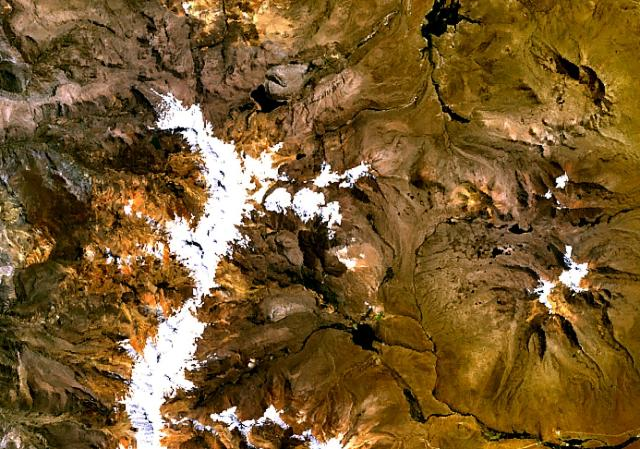
- Barroso mountain range (on the left) as seen from space (NASA Landsat) with Chucñuma in the northern extensions of the range

Highest point
- Elevation: 5,000 m (16,000 ft)
- Coordinates: 17°23′24″S 69°51′07″W

Geography
- Location within Peru
- Location: Peru, Tacna Region
- Parent range: Andes

Chucñuma (possibly from Aymara ch'uxña green, uma water, "green water") is a mountain in the northern extensions of the Barroso mountain range in the Andes of Peru, about 5,000 metres (16,404 ft) high. It is situated in the Tacna Region, Tarata Province, Tarata District. Chucñuma lies northwest of Casiri Lake and north of the mountains Chontacollo and Pacollo.
