= Wiqu (Tacna) =

Mountain in Peru

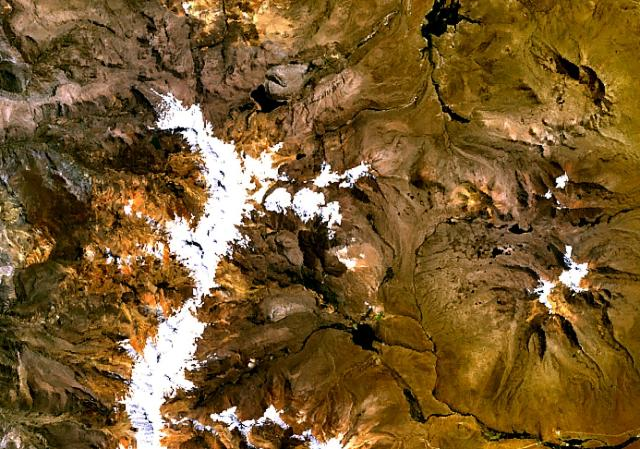
- Barroso mountain range (on the left) as seen from space (NASA Landsat) with Wiqu in the east of it (upper right)

Highest point
- Elevation: 5,200 m (17,100 ft)
- Coordinates: 17°26′11″S 69°40′50″W

Geography
- Location within Peru
- Location: Peru, Tacna Region
- Parent range: Andes

Wiqu (Aymara for a corner in a house, a mountain cove, Hispanicized spelling Veco) is a mountain east of the Barroso mountain range in the Andes of Peru, about 5,200 metres (17,060 ft) high. It is located in the Tacna Region, Tacna Province, Palca District, and in the Tarata Province, Tarata District. Wiqu lies southwest of the mountain Warawarani.
