= Incapachata =

Mountain in Peru

- Location within Peru

Highest point
- Elevation: 5,000 m (16,000 ft)
- Coordinates: 17°21′55″S 69°50′48″W

Geography
- Location: Peru, Tacna Region
- Parent range: Andes, Barroso

Incapachata (possibly from Aymara and Quechua Inka Inca, apachita the place of transit of an important pass in the principal routes of the Andes; a stone cairn, a little pile of rocks built along the trail in the high mountains) is a mountain in the north of the Barroso mountain range in the Andes of southern Peru, about 5,000 m (16,000 ft) high. It is situated in the Tacna Region, Tarata Province, Tarata District. It lies northeast of Vilaucarane and south of Antajave.
