= Qutañani (Peru) =

Mountain in Peru

- Location within Peru

Highest point
- Elevation: 4,200 m (13,800 ft)
- Coordinates: 17°35′44″S 69°58′21″W

Geography
- Location: Peru, Tacna Region, Tacna Province, Tarata Province
- Parent range: Andes

Qutañani (Aymara qutaña dam, -ni a suffix to indicate ownership, "the one with a dam", also spelled Cotañane) is a mountain in the Andes of Peru which reaches a height of approximately 4,200 m (13,800 ft). It is located in the Tacna Region, Tacna Province, Pachia District, and in the Tarata Province, Estique District.
