= Titiri =

Mountain in Peru

- Location within Peru

Highest point
- Elevation: 4,560 m (14,960 ft)
- Coordinates: 17°15′20″S 69°49′26″W

Geography
- Location: Peru, Tacna Region, Tarata Province
- Parent range: Andes

Titiri (Aymara titi Andean mountain cat; lead, -(i)ri a suffix, also spelled Titire) is a 4,560-metre-high (14,961 ft) mountain in the Andes of southern Peru. It is situated in the Tacna Region, Tarata Province, on the border of the districts Tarata and Ticaco. Titiri lies near the village of Ch'allapallqa (Challapalca) southwest of the mountain Tuma Tumani. The Mawri River (Mauri) flows along its northern slopes.
