= Tarata province =

Province of Peru

Coordinates: 17.47463°S 70.03262°W

Tarata
- Province
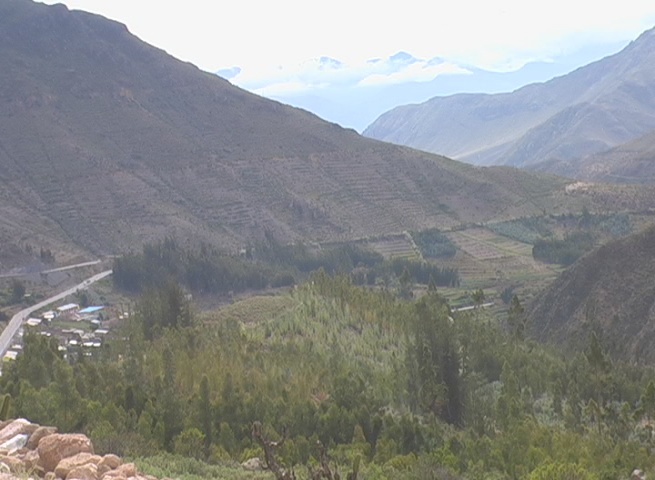
- Valley of the Estique River, Tarata Province

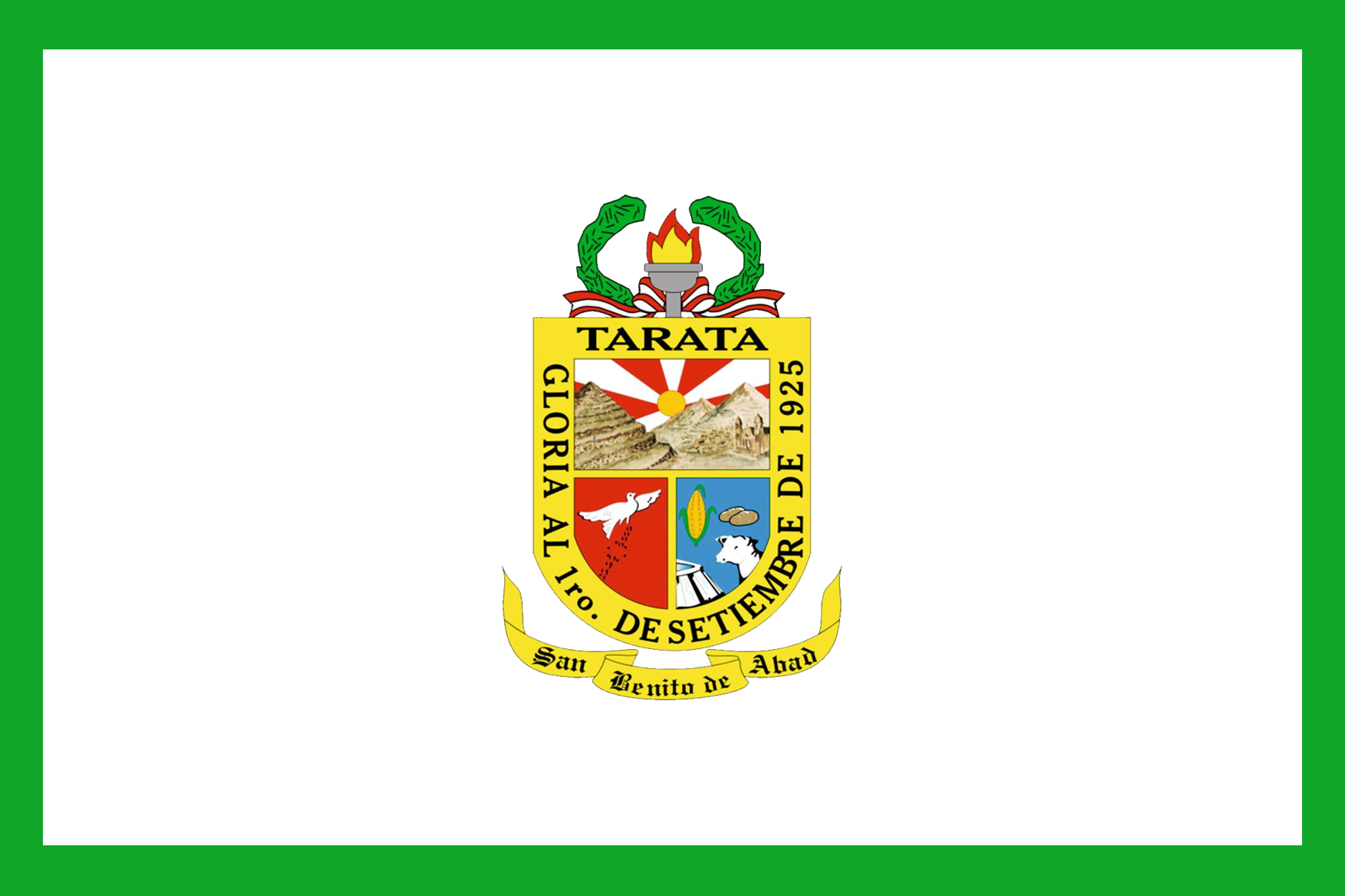
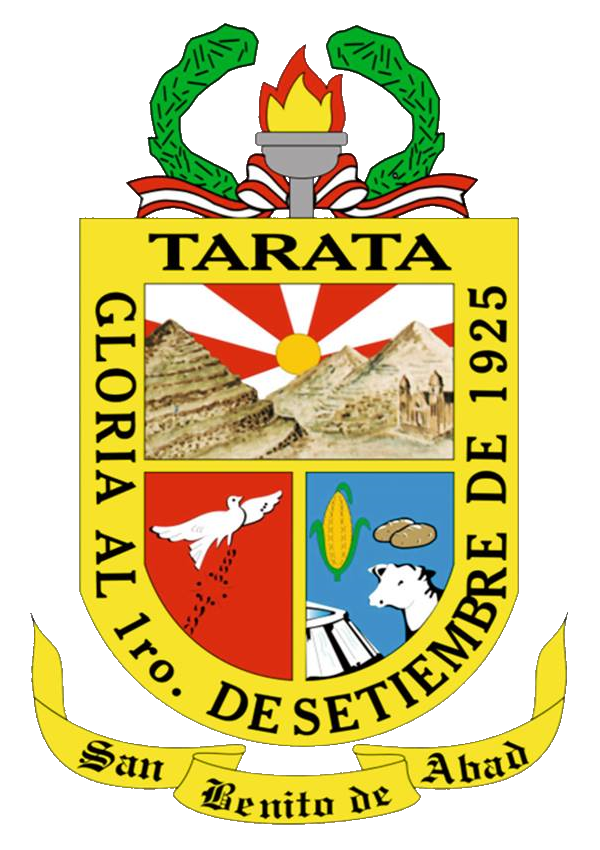
- Flag Coat of arms

- Location of Tarata in Peru
- Country: Peru
- Department: Tacna
- Founded: November 12, 1874
- Capital: Tarata
- Districts: List: Chucatamani; Estique; Estique-Pampa; Sitajara; Susapaya; Tarata; Tarucachi; Ticaco

Government
  - Mayor: Kenny Henry Menendez Copaja

Area
  - Total: 2,819.96 km^{2} (1,088.79 sq mi)

Population
  - Total: 6,630
  - Density: 2.35/km^{2} (6.09/sq mi)
- UBIGEO: 2304

Tarata is a province of the department of Tacna, Peru. It is located in the country's south, on the border with Bolivia. From 1880 to 1925, the province was administered by Chile following the War of the Pacific.

== Etymology ==
According to historian Fortunato Zora Carvajal, there are several possible origins for the area's name. Historian Rómulo Cúneo y Vidal proposed that its name came from union of Tara, the name of a local plant, and the suffix -ta, which means place. The suffix would have been added by the mitimaes, Indians forcibly resettled by the policy of the same name of the Inca Empire. Several other proposals exist.

== History ==
The archaeological work of Rogger Ravines in Karu cave demonstrates an early settlement of the area, possibly dating back to 7000 BC. The oldest human settlement discovered in the province is the Kano site, located a few km from the city. The petroglyphs and cave paintings found there are contemporary with this site. The cave paintings are found exclusively in grottos or caves. The ancient inhabitants of Tarata created their drawings primarily using red ochre clay, although there are also, to a lesser extent, paintings using yellow ochre. The cave paintings of Sitajara, Susapaya, and Talabaya are particularly noteworthy.

The petroglyphs are notable for their depictions of local fauna, hunting scenes, and geometric figures such as circles and spirals. Interpreting these drawings is sometimes difficult because the worldview of prehistoric humans differed from that of modern Andean people. Petroglyph fields can be found in Sujilbaya, Koropuro, Qhanajiri, and Mocara, and also in Estique-pampa and Ticaco.

The Tiahuanaco culture was centered on the Collao Plateau, specifically in the city of Tiwanaku, more than 170 km northeast of Tarata. This culture possessed extensive knowledge of agricultural techniques and a complex religious system. After its fall, the Aymara kingdoms exerted the greatest influence in the region. So much so that Tarata, which today belongs to the Aymara region of southern Peru, was inhabited by the Lupaqha or Lupaca Aymara people, whose memory still endures in place names and surnames. The Lupaqha arrived at the beginning of the Late Intermediate Period, approximately between 1100 and 1200 CE. Their presence was predominant until the Inca conquest and the annexation of the territory to the Inca Empire.

Rómulo Cúneo y Vidal states that the Aymara people who inhabited Tarata, Putina, and Sama came from the town of Pomata, on the shores of Lake Titicaca, which, along with Chucuito, Juli, Ilave, Acora, Zepita, and Yunguyo, formed the great Aymara chiefdom of Chucuito. Even during the colonial period, the chiefs of Pomata, Tarata, Putina, and Sama were the Champilla clan, and this remained the case until 1625. During the rest of the colonial period, the ancient Lupaca lineages of Tarata regained their autonomy over the chiefs of the highlands.

=== Inca and Spanish period ===
The Incas arrived in Tarata in the mid-15th century, annexing it to their empire and naming their territory Yunka. The Incas organized the locals into distinct territories, evidenced by two irrigation systems that remain to this day: Lupaqa, south of the Chacavira River, and Yunka, north of the Chacavira River. The arrival of the Inca culture indicates a reorganization of power and political structure. The territory of Tarata was included within a territorial division called Kolisuyu, which extended from Camaná to San Pedro de Atacama.

Inca architecture is reflected in the construction of various settlements throughout the province. One of the best preserved is the archaeological complex now known as Santa María, located a short distance from Tarata. It is believed to be an Inca tambo attached to the Inca road system, occupying an area of 4,000 m² (100 x 40 meters) at an altitude of 3,082 meters above sea level. Santa María is situated on the edge of a ravine and features trapezoidal niches characteristic of Inca culture. The complex includes rooms, agricultural terraces, and an internal street.

The section of the Inca road through the province of Tarata is an undeniable testament to this civilization's presence in the region, connecting the diverse ecological zones within the province and serving as a means of transportation for the people of Tarata even into the 20th century. The road in Tarata was crucial for the complete integration of the area into the Inca Empire and the exchange of agricultural products. In Tarata, a longitudinal Inca road connects the towns of Estique, Tarata, Ticaco, Sitajara, and Susapaya, continuing into the province of Candarave. There are also other transverse sections branching off from this longitudinal road, connecting Tarata with towns on the coast and the Collao Plateau. Along the Inca road that crosses the province of Tarata, there is also a tambo called Chajlaka, located in the town of Sitajara.

Under the Spanish Empire, Tarata was an important indigenous center, as evidenced by its churches and other colonial buildings. The original town was founded on January 3, 1741. In 1811, hundreds of local Indians under the command of chief Kopaja took part in Francisco de Zela's armed rebellion in Tacna, which was ultimately suppressed.

=== Republican period ===
The district of Tarata was created by Simón Bolívar in 1824. On November 12, 1874, Manuel Pardo created the province by law, integrated by the districts of Estique, Tarucachi, Ticaco y Candarave. In 1880, Tarata was occupied by Chilean troops during the War of the Pacific. Following the 1883 Treaty of Ancón, it was incorporated into the department of Tarata, a subdivision of the province of Tacna, a first-level administrative division created by Chile in 1883 to administer the disputed territory.

Unlike the provinces of Tacna and Arica, the incorporation of this territory was disputed by Peru, as both countries differed in their interpretation of the Sama River's course, which served as the temporary border between Peru and Chile. Furthermore, the creation of the department of Tarata in 1911 aggravated the dispute, which concluded with the department's disestablishment on September 22, 1921, and the return of Tarata to Peru on September 1, 1925. The mediation of U.S. President Calvin Coolidge was significant in the conclusion of the 42-year dispute, known locally as the captivity of Tarata (Spanish: cautiverio de Tarata).

=== Contemporary period ===
Following the province's return to Peru, it was again administered as a subdivision of "Free Tacna" (Tacna libre), the official designation since 1890 of the unoccupied area of the department of the same name.

== Politics ==
The province of Tacna is administered by a municipal government that also administers Tarata District. The Catholic Church in Peru administers the province as part of the Roman Catholic Diocese of Tacna and Moquegua since 1944. (Note: The province was originally part of the diocese of Arequipa and, during its Chilean period, it was administered by the Apostolic Vicariate of Tarapacá.)

=== List of mayors ===
Since 2023, the incumbent mayor is Kenny Henry Menendez Copaja.

Mayor	Party	Term	
Mayor	Party	Begin	End
Serafín Pilco Hualpa	AP–DC	1964	1966
Gregorio Valdivia Escobar	Acción Popular	1967	1969
Military government (1969–1980)
Germán Valdéz Meneses	Acción Popular	1981	1983
Juan Martínez Villalobos	Izquierda Unida	1984	1986
Hernán Napoleón Silva Tellería	APRA	1987	1989
Juan Martínez Villalobos	Izquierda Unida	1990	1992
Brady Rizal Méndez Valdivia	—N/a	1993	1995
Oswaldo Ale Flores	—N/a	1996	1998
Juan Quispe Acero	Vamos Vecino	1999	2002
Germán César Valdez Copaja	—N/a	2003	2006
José Luis Ticona Sanjinez	M.I.R. Tacna Unida	2007	2010
Dafnes Roberto Pérez Palza	Acción Popular	2011	2014
Efraín Caso Páucar	M.I.R. Arriba Tacna	2015	2018
Pascual Cusi Suyor	M.I.R. Fuerza Tacna	2019	2022
Kenny Henry Menendez Copaja	M.I.R. Fuerza Tacna	2023	2026

=== Subdivisions ===
The province is divided into eight districts (Spanish: distritos, singular: distrito), each of which is headed by a mayor (alcalde):

- Chucatamani
- Estique
- Estique-Pampa
- Sitajara
- Susapaya
- Tarata
- Tarucachi
- Ticaco

== Geography ==
The Barroso mountain range traverses the district. Some of the highest mountains in the province are listed below:

- Antajawi
- Chila
- Chunta Qullu
- Churi Qullu
- Churi Wiqu
- Ch'illiwa
- Ch'uxñuma
- Inka Apachita
- Iñuma
- Jach'a T'aja Sirka
- Jach'a Qullu
- Janq'u Qullu
- Jichu Qullu
- Jisk'a Qullu
- Juqhuri
- Khuruña
- Laram Qullu
- Lluqu Qullu
- Lluqu Lluquni
- Pä Qullu
- Pharaquta
- Phuru Phuruni
- Phusnu Pullawi
- P'isaqani
- Qutan Willk'i
- Qutañani
- Q'asiri
- Tawa Qullu
- Taypi Qullu
- Timillu Qullu
- Titiri
- Wallatiri
- Warawarani
- Wariri
- Wila Uqharani
- Wila Qullu
- Wiqu
- Yana K'achi

=== Boundaries ===
The province of Tarata is bounded to the northwest by Candarave province, to the northeast by El Collao province of the department of Puno, to the east by Bolivia, and to the south and west by Tacna province.

== Demographics ==
=== Ethnic groups ===
The province is inhabited by indigenous citizens of Aymara descent. Spanish, however, is the language which the majority of the population (82.31%) learnt to speak in childhood, 17.12% of the residents started speaking using the Aymara language (2007 Peru Census).

== See also ==
- Pharaquta
- Wilaquta
