= Wila Uqharani =

Mountain in Peru

- Location within Peru

Highest point
- Elevation: 5,000 m (16,000 ft)
- Coordinates: 17°22′19″S 69°51′21″W

Geography
- Location: Peru, Tacna Region
- Parent range: Andes, Barroso

Wila Uqharani (Aymara wila uqha, purely colored, -ra, -ni suffixes, also spelled Vilaucarane) is a mountain in the north of the Barroso mountain range in the Andes of southern Peru, about 5,000 m (16,000 ft) high. It is situated in the Tacna Region, Tarata Province, Tarata District. It lies southeast of Inka Apachita.
