= Wallatiri (Peru) =

Mountain in Peru

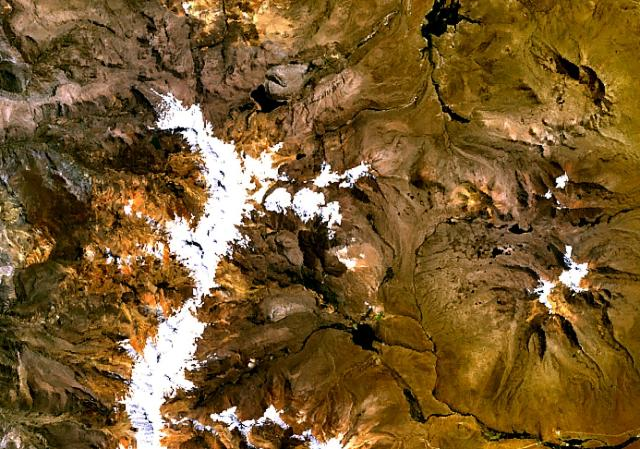
- Barroso mountain range (on the left) as seen from space (NASA Landsat). Wallatiri is visible in the upper left part of the range.

Highest point
- Elevation: 4,600 m (15,100 ft)
- Coordinates: 17°23′37″S 69°55′49″W

Geography
- Location within Peru
- Location: Peru, Tacna Region
- Parent range: Andes, Barroso

Wallatiri (Aymara wallata snow ball, snow lump; Andean goose, -(i)ri a suffix, translated as "abundance of Andean geese" or "habitat of the Andean geese", Hispanicized spelling Huallatire) is a mountain in the northwestern extensions of the Barroso mountain range in the Andes of Peru, about 4,600 metres (15,092 ft) high. It is situated in the Tacna Region, Tarata Province, Tarata District.
