= Warawarani (Peru) =

Mountain in Peru

- Location within Peru

Highest point
- Elevation: 5,200 m (17,100 ft)
- Coordinates: 17°25′19″S 69°39′44″W

Geography
- Location: Peru, Tacna Region, Tacna Province, Tarata Province
- Parent range: Andes

Warawarani (Aymara warawara star, -ni a suffix to indicate ownership, "the one with a star", Hispanicized spelling Buarahuarani) is a mountain in the Andes of southern Peru, about 5,200 metres (17,060 ft) high. It lies in the Tacna Region, Tacna Province, Palca District, and in the Tarata Province, Tarata District. The mountain is situated south of Juqhuri and northeast of Wayna Pawqarani (Huaynapaucarani). West of Warawarani there are two lower mountains named Laram Qullu (Aymara for "blue mountain", Hispanicized Laramcollo) and Wila Qullu (Aymara for "red mountain", Vilacollo)
