= Juqhuri =

Mountain in Peru

- Location within Peru

Highest point
- Elevation: 5,223.1 m (17,136 ft)
- Coordinates: 17°19′28″S 69°41′25″W

Geography
- Location: Peru, Tacna Region, Tarata Province
- Parent range: Andes

Juqhuri (Aymara jughu muddy place, -ri a suffix, Hispanicized spelling Jucure, Jucuri) is a mountain in the Andes of southern Peru, about 5,223.1 metres (17,136 ft) high. It lies in the Tacna Region, Tarata Province, Tarata District. Juqhuri is situated near the Bolivian border, south of the Mawri River (Mauri).
