= Héroes Albarracín District =

Coordinates: 17.4802°S 70.1225°W

Héroes Albarracín
- District
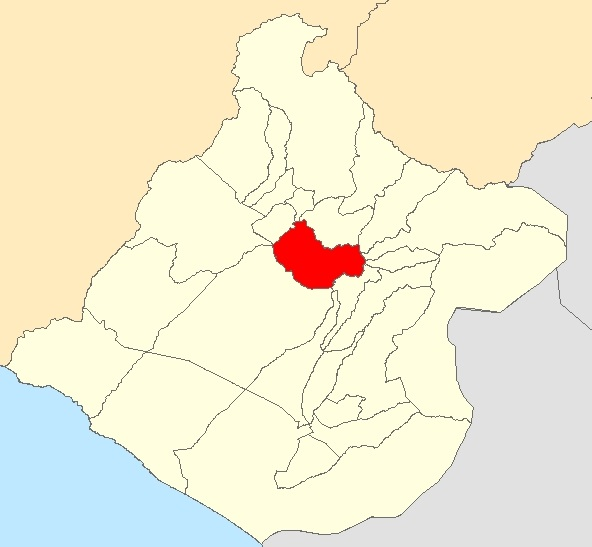
- Location of Chucatamani in the Tarata Province
- Country: Peru
- Region: Tacna
- Province: Tarata
- Founded: January 30, 1953
- Capital: Chucatamani

Government
  - Mayor: Fabian Sebastian Flores Choque

Area
  - Total: 372.41 km^{2} (143.79 sq mi)
- Elevation: 2,325 m (7,628 ft)

Population (2005 census)
  - Total: 447
  - Density: 1.20/km^{2} (3.11/sq mi)
- Time zone: UTC-5 (PET)
- UBIGEO: 230402

Héroes Albarracín District (used to be "Chucatamani" District) is one of eight districts of the province Tarata in Peru.
