= Ticalaco River =

Stream in Tacna, Peru

- Location: Tacna, Peru
- Coordinates: 17.45005°S 70.03329°W
- Type: River
- Primary outflows: Sama River
- Ocean/sea sources: Pacific Ocean

Ticalaco River is a river on the Pacific slope, located in southern Peru, department of Tacna, it runs from east to west crossing the coastal desert of Peru until its mouth at the Sama River in Tacna Province.

Historically, from 1885 to 1925, the Ticalaco river was temporarily set as the political boundary between Peru and Chile after the War of the Pacific, as Chile considered it part of the Sama River and therefore as a boundary set in the Treaty of Ancón. A border checkpoint of the same name was built on the river by Chile. Within the disputed area was the Tarata Department, which was ultimately returned to Peru.

== See also ==
- List of rivers of Peru
