= Ancomarca Plateau =

Plateau at the Bolivia–Chile–Peru tripoint

The Ancomarca Plateau (Spanish: Meseta de Ancomarca) is an elevated plateau around the Bolivia–Chile–Peru tripoint. It lies at 4,115 m asl. Villages in the plateau include Ancomarca in Peru, Charaña in Bolivia and Visviri in Chile. In colonial times the area of the plateau was organized as an ayllu.
