= Pacollo =

Mountain in Peru

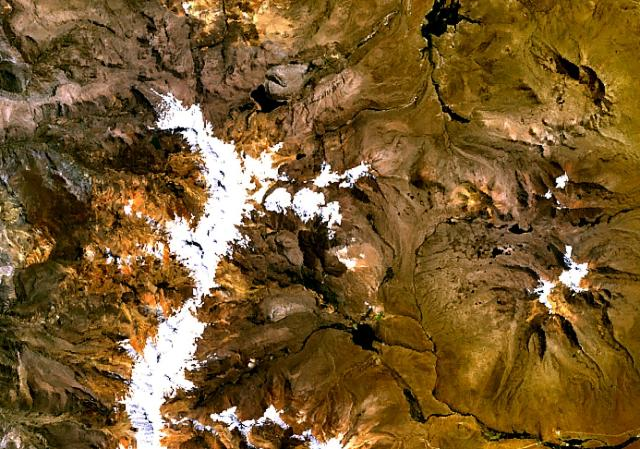
- Barroso mountain range (on the left) as seen from space (NASA Landsat) with Pacollo in the upper part of the range

Highest point
- Elevation: 5,000 m (16,000 ft)
- Coordinates: 17°24′40″S 69°50′57″W

Geography
- Location within Peru
- Location: Peru, Tacna Region
- Parent range: Andes

Pacollo (possibly from Aymara pä two (ä stands for a long a), qullu mountain, "two mountains") is a mountain in the north of the Barroso mountain range in the Andes of Peru, about 5,000 metres (16,404 ft) high. It is situated in the Tacna Region, Tarata Province, Tarata District. Pacollo lies northwest of Casiri Lake and northeast of the mountain Chontacollo.
