= Sama River =

River in Peru

Location
- Department: Tacna
- Country: Peru

Physical characteristics
- Source
  - coordinates: 17°28′27″S 70°10′14″W
- Mouth: Pacific Ocean
  - location: Boca del Río, Peru
  - coordinates: 18°09′47″S 70°40′35″W
- Length: 164 kilometres (102 mi)
- Basin size: 4,738 square kilometres (1,829 sq mi)

Sama River is a river on the Pacific slope, located on the southern coast of Peru, in the department of Tacna. It is born in the Cotanvilque lagoon located in the Andean peaks south of the western mountain range of the Peruvian Andes in the province of Tarata, between the Contanvilque and Cauchina hills, and runs from east to west crossing the coastal desert of Peru to its mouth in the Mar de Grau, located in the province of Tacna.

== History ==
It receives its name from the confluence of the Salado and Tala rivers, and in its upper basin is the Jarumas reservoir.

Historically, from 1883 to 1929, the Sama River was temporarily set as the political boundary between Peru and Chile after the War of the Pacific with the Treaty of Ancón.

== Basin ==
The Sama River has a length of 164 km from its source and its basin has an area of 4,738 km^{2}, covering the provinces of Tarata and Tacna in the department of Tacna. The Sama River basin is bordered to the north by the Locumba River basin, to the east by the Maure River basin, to the south by the Caplina River basin and to the west by the Pacific Ocean.

== See also ==
- List of rivers of Peru
- Ticalaco River
