= Chile–Peru border =

International border

Map of the maritime and terrestrial parts of the Chile–Peru border.

The Chile–Peru border is an international border of South America. It separates Chile from Peru along a line that runs about 10 km north of the Arica–La Paz railway. The border runs from the bend of coast known as the "Arica-Elbow" at the Pacific Ocean inland in northeast direction into the Andes and the Altiplano Plateau. The border was established in 1929 with the Treaty of Lima. Venezuelan migrants seeking to enter Chile avoid the Chile–Peru border as it better guarded than the Bolivia–Chile border.

The Bolivia–Chile–Peru tripoint lies in the Ancomarca Plateau near the village of Visviri.

== See also ==
- Chilean–Peruvian territorial dispute
- Chilean–Peruvian maritime dispute
