= Tacna province =

Province of Peru

Coordinates: 18.01466°S 70.24887°W

Tacna Taqna (Aymara and Quechua)
- Province
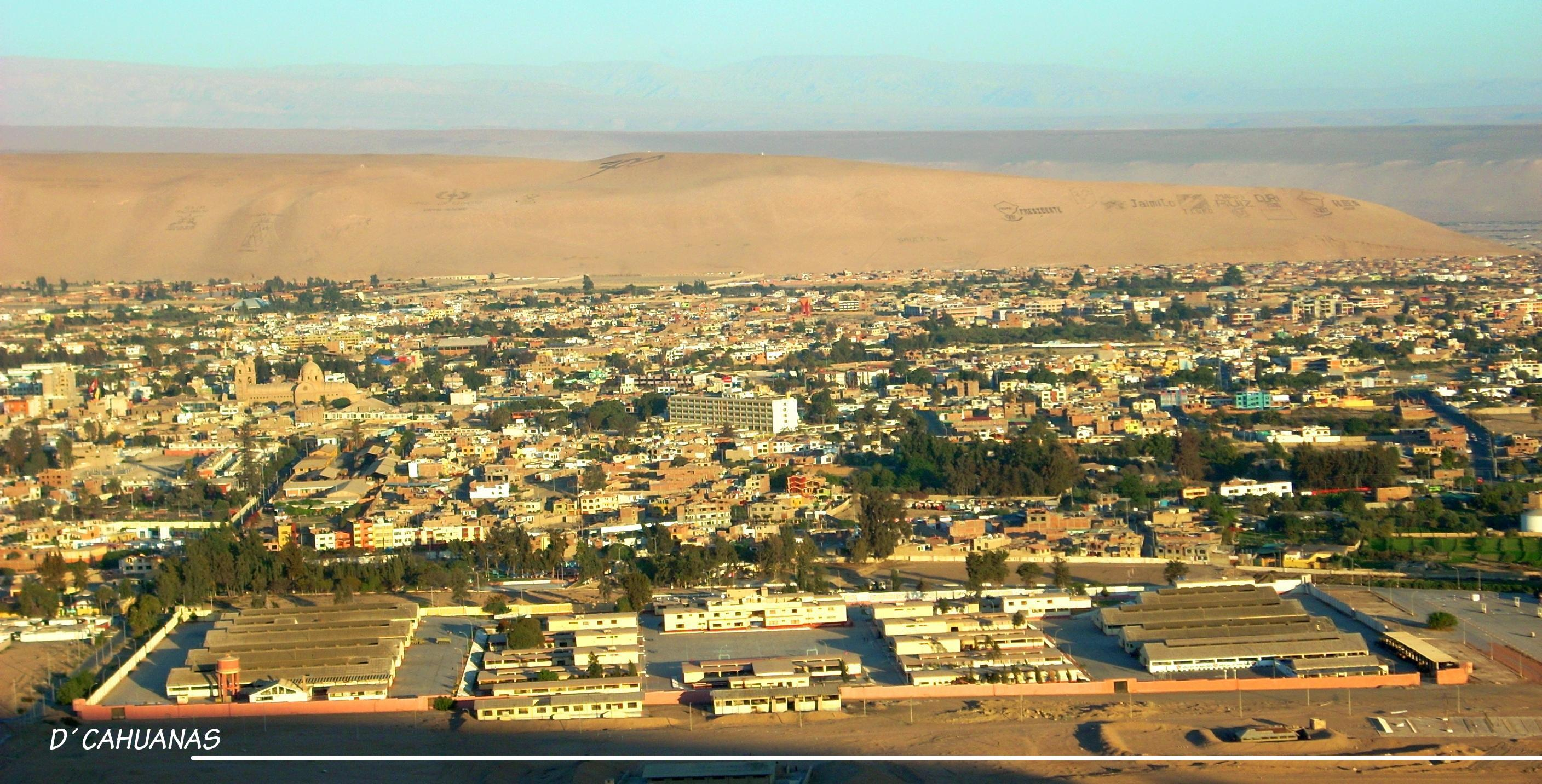
- Overhead view of the city of Tacna

- Flag Coat of arms

- Location of Tacna in Peru
- Country: Peru
- Department: Tacna
- Founded: 25 June 1855
- Capital: Tacna
- Districts: List: Alto de la Alianza; Calana; Ciudad Nueva; Coronel Gregorio Albarracín Lanchipa; Inclán; Pachía; Palca; Pocollay; Sama; La Yarada-Los Palos; Tacna

Government
  - Mayor: Pascual Güisa Bravo

Area
  - Total: 8,066.11 km^{2} (3,114.34 sq mi)

Population
  - Total: 250,509
  - Density: 31.0570/km^{2} (80.4372/sq mi)
- UBIGEO: 2301
- Website: www.munitacna.gob.pe

Tacna (Spanish pronunciation: [ˈtaɣna]; Aymara and Quechua: Taqna) is a province of the department of Tacna, Peru. It is located in the country's south, on the border with Chile and Bolivia and it's is the largest of the department's four provinces. From 1883 to 1929, the province's territory south of the Sama River was administered by Chile following the War of the Pacific.

== Etymology ==
The term Tacna is derived from two Quechua words: Taka, meaning 'to hit', and na, which means 'place'. Thus, the full name means "I hit this place" or "I rule this place".

== History ==
The area that today constitutes the province was once dependent on the port city of San Marcos de Arica, which functioned as a corregimiento from 1565 to 1787, as a partido of the intendancy of Arequipa until 1823 and, finally, as a province of Peru. On June 25, 1855, the province of Arica, then suppressed, was reestablished as part of the department of Moquegua, and its northern part was separated to form the province of Tacna. Each province was divided into the following districts:

Province	Districts
Arica	Arica
Arica	Codpa
Arica	Belén
Arica	Socoroma
Tacna	Tacna
Tacna	Candarave
Tacna	Ylabaya
Tacna	Locumba
Tacna	Sama

Each had their eponymous cities as political capitals. The sub-prefect resided in Arica, while the prefect continued to reside in Tacna. On June 25, 1875, the department of Tacna was created by law. It included the provinces of Tacna, Arica and Tarata. This was the last administrative change prior to the War of the Pacific, which began in 1879.

The first Peruvian territory to be occupied by the Chilean Army during the war was the port of Pisagua, whose occupation took place on November 2 of that year. The Chilean campaign was successful, and led to the military occupation of the provinces of Iquique and Tarapacá following the Peruvian retreat despite a military success at the battle of Tarapacá.

The first Peruvian troops that left Tarapacá arrived to the city of Arica on December 17. The following year, the Chilean Navy carried out an amphibious landing at the port city of Ilo on February 26, and the bombardment of Arica began the following day. The army continued to the south until it reached the city of Tacna on May 26, after which a battle was fought at Intiorko Hill, located on the outskirts of the city. The Chilean Army subsequently occupied the city and Bolivia withdrew from the conflict. On June 7, the Chilean advance reached and conquered Arica.

Following another campaign that reached the capital, the government of Miguel Iglesias signed the Treaty of Ancón on October 20, 1883. Under the terms of the agreement, Peru ceded its department of Tarapacá, while the provinces of Tacna and Arica would be subject to Chilean control, after which a plebiscite would be held. This never came to pass.

=== Chilean period ===
From 1880 to 1929, the provinces of Arica and Tacna were central to the 46-year dispute between both Peru and Chile. Tacna was divided into an area administered by Chile, and another one administered by Peru. Both territories were divided by the Sama River.

On April 1, 1884, Miguel Iglesias created the department of Moquegua, incorporating the districts of Locumba and Ilabaya. On October 31 of the same year, the Chilean government established its own province of Tacna, subjecting the territory to a process of forced acculturation. Meanwhile, three years after Moquegua's creation, Andrés Avelino Cáceres declared its law null and void, with the districts returning to their original jurisdiction.

The Supreme Resolution of April 18, 1887, designated the towns of Ilabaya and Candarave as provincial seats of the sub-prefects of Tacna and Tarata. On January 10, 1890, a Supreme Resultion designated the town of Locumba as the capital of the province and department of Free Tacna (Spanish: Tacna Libre), a name that would apply to the non-occupied area for the remainder of the dispute. At the time, the town had a population of 300 inhabitants. The same document established the parliamentary representation of one senator and two deputies representing Tacna and Tarata.

Following this change, the de jure administration of the department was as follows:

Country	Administrative divisions		
Country	Department	Provinces	Districts
Peru	Tacna	Arica (Note: Of these de jure provinces, Peru only controlled Tacna and Tarata. Although each remaining province had six districts, Peru only controlled three of each.)	Arica
Peru	Tacna	Arica	Belén
Peru	Tacna	Arica	Codpa
Peru	Tacna	Arica	Livilcar
Peru	Tacna	Arica	Lluta
Peru	Tacna	Arica	Socoroma
Peru	Tacna	Tacna	Locumba
Peru	Tacna	Tacna	Calana
Peru	Tacna	Tacna	Ilabaya
Peru	Tacna	Tacna	Pachía
Peru	Tacna	Tacna	Sama
Peru	Tacna	Tacna	Tacna
Peru	Tacna	Tarata	Candarave
Peru	Tacna	Tarata	Curibaya
Peru	Tacna	Tarata	Estique
Peru	Tacna	Tarata	Tarata
Peru	Tacna	Tarata	Tarucachi
Peru	Tacna	Tarata	Ticaco
Country	Province	Departments	Communes
Chile	Tacna	Tacna	Tacna
Chile	Tacna	Arica	Arica
Chile	Tacna	Tarata	Tarata

On June 3, 1929, the Treaty of Lima was signed between Emiliano Figueroa (then President of Chile) and Pedro José Rada y Gamio (then Prime Minister of Peru). A handover ceremony took place on August 28 of the same year. While Tacna was reincorporated into Peru, Arica was permanently ceded to Chile.

=== Contemporary period ===
Following the agreement, a boundary commission worked to formally determine a final border. Its work concluded on July 21, 1930.

On August 29, 1975, a successful military coup began in the city with the aim of overthrowing Juan Velasco Alvarado, then president of the Revolutionary Government of the Armed Forces of Peru.

On November 13, 1999, an act to execute the treaty's pending clauses was signed by Juan Gabriel Valdés (Foreign Minister of Chile), Alberto Fujimori (president of Peru) and Fernando de Trazegnies (Foreign Minister of Peru).

== Politics ==
The province of Tacna is administered by a municipal government that also administers Tacna District. The Regional Government of Tacna is based in the province's capital, Tacna. The Catholic Church in Peru administers the province as part of the Roman Catholic Diocese of Tacna and Moquegua since 1944. (Note: The province was originally part of the diocese of Arequipa and, during its Chilean period, it was administered by the Apostolic Vicariate of Tarapacá. The original seat of the diocese was San Ramón Church, demolished following its closure in 1910.)

=== List of mayors ===
Since 2023, the incumbent mayor is Pascual Milton Güisa Bravo.

№	Mayor	Party	Term	
№	Mayor	Party	Begin	End
—	Guillermo Roberto MacLean Portocarrero			
—	Adolfo Silva Vergara		1884	?
1	Armando Vargas Blondell		August 28, 1929	August 26, 1930
2	Juan Zuliaga		August 26, 1930	January 24, 1931
3	Enrique Quijano		January 24, 1931	February 29, 1932
4	Guillermo Ostalaza		February 29, 1932	May 31, 1932
5	Luis Zevallos		May 31, 1932	September 8, 1933
6	Enrique Quijano		September 9, 1933	October 2, 1937
7	Francisco Barrios Nieto		October 2, 1937	March 14, 1940
8	Julio G. Mac Lean		April 12, 1940	May 19, 1945
9	Raul Sagarnaga Ibarra		May 19, 1945	September 18, 1945
10	Filidor Cavagnaro Herrera		September 18, 1945	March 18, 1948
11	Francisco Barrios Nieto		March 18, 1948	April 7, 1949
12	Milo Guarderas		April 7, 1949	August 10, 1949
13	Jorge Martorell Flores		August 10, 1949	October 3, 1951
14	Raul Sagarnaga Ibarra		October 3, 1951	January 15, 1954
15	Victor Cornejo Vargas		January 15, 1954	February 9, 1955
16	Oscar R. Garibaldi Portocarrero		February 9, 1955	November 28, 1955
17	Miguel A. Cornejo Bouroncle		January 24, 1956	September 1, 1956
18	Alfonso Eyzaguirre Tara		September 1, 1956	January 19, 1959
19	Guillermo Auza Arce		January 19, 1959	April 10, 1961
20	José Miguel Vela Cornejo		April 10, 1961	September 27, 1962
21	Cesar Chiarella Arce		September 27, 1962	January 18, 1964
22	Armando Fuster Rossi		January 18, 1964	January 1967
23	Romulo Boluarte Ponce de León		January 2, 1967	December 1969
24	Humberto Cuneo Bacigalupo		August 8, 1970	April 13, 1975
25	Emilio Santa Maria Montealegre		April 14, 1975	August 9, 1975
26	Guido Rossi Loureiro		August 10, 1975	September 3, 1980
27	Breno Gaete Acha		September 15, 1980	December 31, 1980
28	Guillermo Silva Flor		January 2, 1981	December 31, 1983
29	Grover Pango Vildoso		January 2, 1984	July 24, 1985
30	Carlos Hurtado Chiang		July 25, 1985	December 31, 1986
31	Tito Chocano Olivera		January 2, 1987	December 31, 1989
32	Tito Chocano Olivera		January 2, 1990	December 31, 1992
33	Tito Chocano Olivera		January 2, 1993	December 31, 1995
34	Tito Chocano Olivera		January 2, 1996	December 31, 1998
35	Luis Torres Robledo		January 2, 1999	December 31, 2002
36	Jacinto Gómez Mamani	Partido Renacimiento Andino	January 2, 2003	December 31, 2006
37	Luis Torres Robledo		January 2, 2007	December 31, 2010
38	Fidel Carita Monroy	Movimiento Tacna en Acción	January 1, 2011	December 31, 2014
39	Luis Torres Robledo	(M.I.R.) Fuerza Tacna	January 1, 2015	March 8, 2018
40	Jorge Luis Infantas Franco	Fuerza Tacna	March 9, 2018	November 23, 2018
41	Pedro Maquera Cruz	Fuerza Tacna	November 23, 2018	December 17, 2018
42	Dajayra Fernanda Gil Loza	Fuerza Tacna	December 17, 2018	December 31, 2018
43	Julio Daniel Medina Castro	(M.I.R.) Frente Unitario Popular	January 1, 2019	December 31, 2022
44	Pascual Milton Güisa Bravo	Fuerza Tacna	January 1, 2023	Incumbent

The province's first mayor was Armando Vargas Blondell, who took office following the return of the province to Peru in 1929. Prior to that, Adolfo Silva Vergara took office in 1884, when the Chilean administrative division was established.

=== List of priests ===
Since 2006, the incumbent bishop is Marco Antonio Cortez Lara. The Cathedral of Tacna serves as the seat of the city's bishop. The list of bishops prior to the establishment of the diocese is as follows:

Name	Term	
Name	Begin	End
José Félix Andía	January 13, 1902	November 16, 1909 (Note: Died in office.)
José María Flores Mextre	1909	February 27, 1910 (Note: Expelled, among other priests, on the orders of intendant Máximo Lira. On March 15, the group was escorted to Sama.)

=== Subdivisions ===
The province is divided into 11 districts (Spanish: distritos, singular: distrito), each of which is headed by a mayor (alcalde):

- Alto de la Alianza (La Esperanza)
- Calana (Calana)
- Ciudad Nueva (Ciudad Nueva)
- Coronel Gregorio Albarracín Lanchipa (Alfonso Ugarte)
- Inclán (Sama Grande)
- Pachía (Pachía)
- Palca (Palca)
- Pocollay (Pocollay)
- Sama (Las Yaras)
- La Yarada-Los Palos (Los Palos)
- Tacna (Tacna)

== Geography ==
The Barroso mountain range traverses the province. Some of the highest mountains of the province are listed below:

- Awki Taypi
- Chachakumani
- Chullunkhäni
- Chunta Qullu
- Chupikiña
- Ch'alluta
- Iñuma
- Jach'a Pata
- Jach'a Qullu
- Janq'u Chawllani
- Janq'u Qalani
- Karpani
- Kunturini
- Khuruña
- Lluqu Qullu
- Piqu
- Pukata
- Pupusani
- Phaq'u Q'awa
- Qiwñani
- Qiwñuta
- Qutañani
- Q'uli Q'ulini
- Quri Qurini
- Q'asiri
- Wanq'uni
- Wanuni
- Waña Q'awa
- Warawarani
- Wayna Pawqarani
- Wila Qullu
- Wila Wilani
- Wila Willk'i
- Wiqu

=== Boundaries ===
The province is limited to the northwest by Jorge Basadre Province, to the north by Tarata Province, to the east by Chile and Bolivia, to the south by Chile and to the southwest by the Pacific Ocean.

== Demographics ==
=== Ethnic groups ===
The province is inhabited by indigenous citizens of Aymara and Quechua descent. Spanish, however, is the language which the majority of the population (80.88%) learnt to speak in childhood, 16.34% of the residents started speaking using the Aymara language and 2.55% using Quechua (2007 Peru Census).

== See also ==
- Tacna Province (Chile)
- Arica Province (Peru)
