= Tacna (disambiguation) =

Tacna is a city in southern Peru. Tacna may also refer to:

- Department of Tacna, also in Peru
- Tacna Province, a province in the Tacna region in Peru
- Tacna District, a district in the Tacna province in Peru
- the former name of the Roman Catholic Diocese of Tacna y Moquegua
- Tacna, Arizona, a census-designated place in the United States
