= Handover of Tacna =

1929 handover of Tacna from Chile to Peru

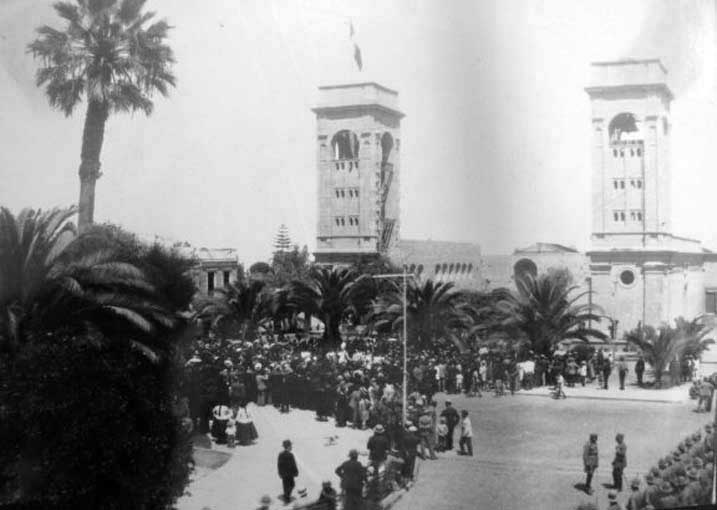
- The unfinished Cathedral during the events
- Date: 28 August 1929
- Location: Tacna
- Also known as: Reincorporation of Tacna
- Participants: Chile; Peru

The handover of Tacna from Chile to Peru took place on August 28, 1929. The event ended 49 years of Chilean rule over its then newest province, which began in 1880 after the Bolivian–Peruvian defeat at the Battle of Tacna against the Chilean Army during the War of the Pacific.

== Background ==
Chile and Peru had been involved in a territorial dispute regarding the provinces of Tacna and Arica since their military occupation by the former during the War of the Pacific, which pinned an alliance of Peru and Bolivia against neighbouring Chile that was ultimately defeated. The Peruvian government of Miguel Iglesias signed the Treaty of Ancón with Chile on October 20, 1883, where Tarapacá was unconditionally ceded to Chile, while Tacna and Arica were to be occupied for ten years, during which a plebiscite would be organised.

The failure of the plebiscite's organisation led to diplomatic campaigns between both countries against each other, with Peru ultimately seeking the mediation of the United States under President Herbert Hoover. These negotiations led to the signing of the Treaty of Lima in 1929, through which Peru received US$ 6 million indemnity, a number of concessions, and the return of Tacna, with Arica remaining in Chile.

== Handover ==
On June 3, 1929, the Treaty of Lima was signed by then Peruvian Representative Pedro José Rada y Gamio and Chilean Representative Emiliano Figueroa Larrain, leading to the effective return of Tacna to Peru at midnight, on the 28th of August 1929, creating the Department of Tacna, and Arica (both the former Peruvian Department as well as some territory of the Department of Tacna ceded by the treaty) was permanently given to Chile, being integrated into the Tarapacá Province, ending the existence of the Chilean Province of Tacna. Nevertheless, even with the border conflict officially over, controversy would continue among nationals of both Peru and Bolivia, who would continue her claims over her lost territories, seeking once again a connection to the ocean with the assistance of international mediators on the issue which is yet to be solved, and continues to this day. The handover had no official ceremony, with some Chilean officials temporarily staying behind to assist Peru regarding the new administration. Nonetheless, the return of the territory was met with celebrations in Peru, with President Augusto B. Leguía overseeing a military parade in Lima, and church bells ringing in celebration. Some Chilean citizens, who had remained in the province after the handover asked to be repatriated.

=== Timeline ===
- June 4: the news of the Treaty of Lima reach Tacna.
- July 21: the withdrawal of Chilean citizens begins in Tacna, with most being headed towards nearby Arica.
- July 28: The Treaty of Lima is promulgated in Chile.
- July 28: The Húsares de Junín regiment leaves Tarata for Tacna under the command of Colonel Ricardo Luna and Commander Carlos Beytía.

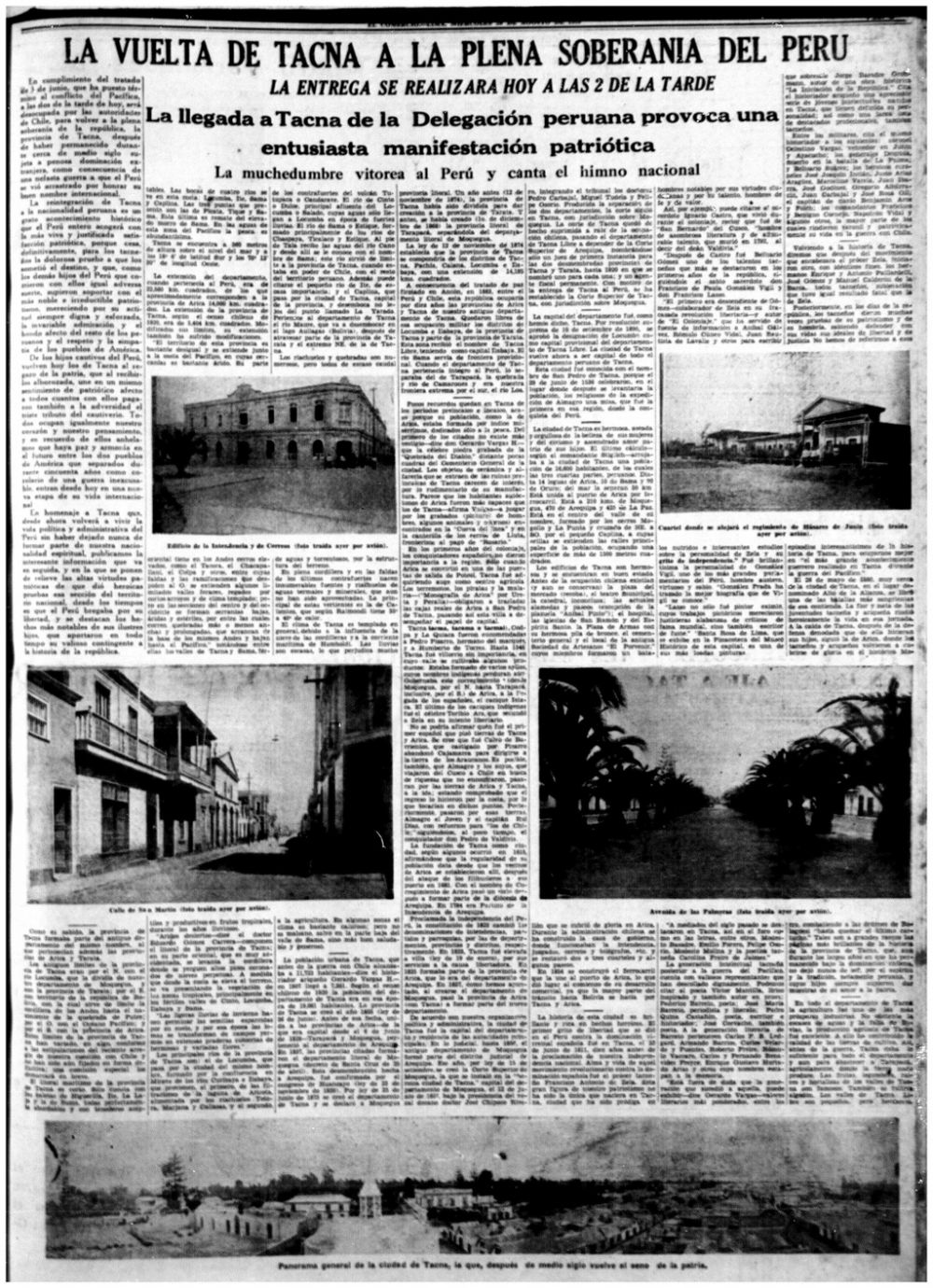
Newspaper announcing the return of Tacna to Peru

- August 1: the Peruvian government decrees the political and judicial organization of the Department of Tacna and allocates funds for it.
- August 6: the treaty for compliance is published in the Official Journal of the Republic of Chile.
- August 14: The "Tacna Detachment" of the Civil Guard is formed in Lima with three companies under the command of Captains Guillermo Zavala Ituchetegui, Estanislao Matta Delfín and Justo Frías Zeballos.
- August 21: The Mantaro transport ship departs from Callao with the entire Peruvian delegation that was going to receive Tacna, which includes policemen, teachers, officials and public employees of the Peruvian government. The newspaper La Patria appears in the city, edited by Raquel Delgado de Castro.
- August 26: The Chilean newspaper El Pacífico stops circulation.
- August 27: As the Peruvian delegation is set to arrive in Arica, journalists are waiting for them since the early hours of the morning. At noon the delegation arrives. The first to leave the ship are the members of the Peruvian commission led by Pedro José Rada and Gamio, who are received by Chilean representatives and Peruvians from Arica.

[...] but there were other faces, faces in which one could read the anguish as this arrival was not meant for them, this visit of redemption. Yes, our brothers from Arica.

— Correspondent of Lima-based newspaper La Prensa. August 27, 1929

The Peruvian delegation boards the train in Arica and arrives in Tacna at 5pm, where they are received at the railway station with cheers for Tacna, Peru and Leguía. At 5:00 p.m., from Tarata, the Husares de Junín enter Tacna through Alto Lima street. At 11:00 p.m., the Tacna Civil Guard Detachment arrives at the El Escuadrón police station, where Captain Guillermo Zavala Ituchetegui receives them. At 1:00 a.m. on August 28, the last 5 Chilean policemen are relieved, who retire to a checkpoint in Caramolle and then leave for Arica.

- August 28: The city of Tacna is full of Peruvian flags and people from Calana, Pachía, Sama, Locumba (which had formerly served as the capital of the rump Peruvian department), Ilabaya, Candarave and Tarata (also formerly administered by Chile) gather in the streets. The residents are concentrated in the Paseo Cívico and the Pasaje Vigil, wearing rosettes and red and white ribbons.

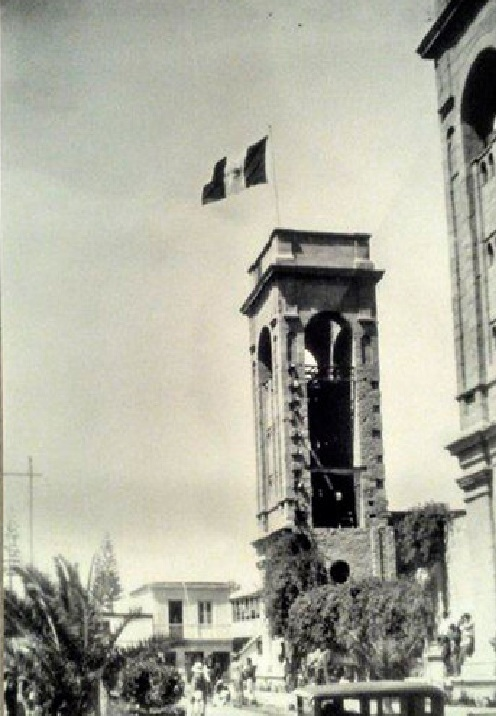
The flag of Peru flies over the Tacna Cathedral during the reincorporation.

The delegations from Peru and Chile meet in the city's courthouse, where the Commission in charge of the 1926 plebiscite was based. At 2:00 p.m., the Peruvian delegates, Pedro José Rada y Gamio, General José Ramón Pizarro, Arturo Núñez Chávez, Blondell, Ángel Gustavo Cornejo and Monsignor Mariano Holguín and the Chilean delegates, Gonzalo Robles and Alberto Serrano, who sign the Tacna Handover Act (Spanish: Acta de entrega de Tacna); the meeting ends at 3:00 p.m. At the same time, the policemen under the command of Captain Estanislao Matta Delfín began patrolling the city. After that act; Gathered in the Pasaje Vigil, Pedro José Rada y Gamio delivers a speech on the delivery of Tacna. The official delegation and the residents leave the Vigil passage in the direction of the Paseo Cívico.

Thousands of locals in the Paseo Cívico were eager to witness the arrival of the Chilean and Peruvian delegates, signatories of the Handover Act, and the hoisting of the Peruvian flag in the Prefecture. When the flagpole was found damaged, however, local Edgar Empson climbed the Tacna Cathedral to hoist it on its left tower. The band of the Húsares de Junín Cavalry Regiment of the Peruvian Army then proceeded to play the National Anthem of Peru. Monsignor Holguin also broadcast his speech, followed by the ringing of the cathedral's bells. The parade continued with the participation of the Húsares de Junín, the Junín Guard and the police forces.

At 5:00 p.m., the new mayor of Tacna, Armando Vargas Blondell, is sworn in. The president of the Court of Justice, Carlos A. Téllez, and the prefect, Federico Fernandini Muñoz, are also sworn in. The day ended with a dinner for the delegates and the new authorities. Meanwhile, in Lima, military parades were held at the old Santa Beatriz Racetrack (today Campo de Marte) as part of the celebrations.

- In the days after the handover, 15 schools and 3 National Colleges were created.
- On October 18, the Coronel Bolognesi football club was created.
- During the government of Juan Velasco Alvarado, August 28 is declared "Civic Day".

Thus, on the last week of August, the festivities of Tacna are celebrated, starting on the 27th, with the Offering of Youth, followed on the 28th by the Tribute to the Woman from Tacna and finally a flag procession. It ends on August 30 with Saint Rose of Lima day.

== See also ==
- Rio Protocol, which led to the withdrawal of Peruvian troops from Ecuador in 1942
- Chilean–Peruvian territorial dispute
