= Yeyson Liendo Mamani and Sonia Gaona Yaguno =

Peruvian serial killers

Yeyson Liendo Mamani
- Born: Yeyson Jorge Liendo Mamani; January 1, 1986 (age 40); Inclán District, Tacna Province, Peru
- Conviction: Murder x5
- Penalty: 35 years imprisonment

Details
- Victims: 5
- Span of crimes: October 30 – December 16, 2018
- Country: Peru
- State: Tacna
- Date apprehended: December 28, 2018

Sonia Gaona Yaguno
- Born: Sonia Karina Gaona Yaguno; September 26, 1991 (age 35); Arequipa, Arequipa Province, Peru
- Conviction: Murder x5
- Penalty: 35 years imprisonment

Details
- Victims: 5
- Span of crimes: October 30 – December 16, 2018
- Country: Peru
- State: Tacna
- Date apprehended: December 28, 2018

Yeyson Jorge Liendo Mamani (born January 1, 1986) and Sonia Karina Gaona Yaguno (born September 26, 1991) are Peruvian serial killers who robbed and killed five men in the Tacna Department from October to December 2018. Both were found guilty on all counts and each was sentenced to 35 years imprisonment.

== Modus operandi ==
The couple's modus operandi consisted of Gaona selecting men she met at nightclubs and offering them either a friendly chat or sexual intimacy, then getting them drunk and convincing them to go together to hotels or to their homes.

Once in a location without any potential witnesses, Liendo - who would follow Gaona and the victim - would then restrain and proceeded to torture the victim until he revealed the password to his bank account. Once the confessions were obtained, Liendo would strangle him and then steal his belongings.

== Murders ==
=== José Luis Chino Ticona ===
On October 30, 2018, 33-year-old José Luis Chino Ticona, a former football player and manager known as "Pachingo", was found dead at his room in the village of La Esperanza, either by his father or his mother. He had been stabbed to death, and his room had been set on fire in an attempt to destroy evidence.

=== Edwin Chacmana Aguilar ===
On November 16, the body of 42-year-old engineer Edwin Felipe Chacmana Aguilar was found inside a house in the Coronel Gregorio Albarracín Lanchipa District. He had been hanged, and witnesses claimed that they had seen him in the company of an unknown young woman the day prior. His body was positively identified by his brother-in-law.

=== Rodolfo Alanoca Llanos ===
On November 30, the body of 52-year-old Rodolfo Mariano Alanoca Llanos, a professor at the Universidad Privada de Tacna, was found inside the trunk of his Chevrolet Spark, clad only in his underwear. Due to the rate of decomposition, it was determined that he had died approximately 12 hours prior, and had been strangled to death with a cable.

=== Guillermo Gutiérrez Salas ===
On December 3, 35-year-old Guillermo Gutiérrez Salas, an employee of the National Penitentiary Institute, was killed by the pair, with his body found three days later. He was naked on the floor of a room in a house he had rented on Pinto Avenue in Tacna. Like the previous victims, he had been strangled.

=== Bladimir Calle Gutiérrez ===
On December 16, the body of 57-year-old Vladimir Hilario Calle Gutiérrez, a Zofratacna employee, was found inside a building in Urbanización Caplina G-11. The autopsy determined that he died of mechanical asphyxiation.

== Arrest, trial, and imprisonment ==
Near the end of December 2018, authorities who were still investigating the murder of Chino Ticona tracked down his movements after leaving the "Millenium" bar in the Industrial Park and the "Los Geranios" bar. They found Gaona at the latter bar, where she worked as a prostitute, and initially only took her statements as a witness - however, an examination of fingerprints found on a wine bottle found at the crime scene. Not long after, Liendo was arrested as well. With the evidence mounting against them, the pair confessed not only to killing Chino Ticona, but also the four other men in the last two months in the same way.

Both were arrested on December 27, 2018, and were put on trial in 2020. Liendo pleaded guilty on all counts in May 2020, and was sentenced to 35 years imprisonment. Gaona also admitted guilty, but contested the evidence against her. A month after Liendo's sentencing, she was also convicted and sentenced to 35 years imprisonment. The pair were jointly ordered to pay 42,857 soles in reparations to the victims' family members of the first four victims, as well as an additional 150,000 soles for the family members of Calle Gutiérrez.

== See also ==
- List of serial killers by country
