= Sama District =

Coordinates: 17.8650°S 70.5621°W

Sama Distrito de Sama
- District
- Location of Sama in the Tacna Province
- Country: Peru
- Region: Tacna
- Province: Tacna
- Capital: Las Yaras

Government
  - Mayor: Milton Juarez

Area
  - Total: 1,115.98 km^{2} (430.88 sq mi)
- Elevation: 374 m (1,227 ft)

Population (2017 census)
  - Total: 3,106
  - Density: 2.783/km^{2} (7.208/sq mi)
- Time zone: UTC-5 (PET)
- UBIGEO: 230109

Sama District is one of eleven districts that make up Tacna Province, located in the department of Tacna, under the administration of the Regional Government of Tacna, in southern Peru. In 2017, it had a population of 3,106 inhabitants and a population density of 2.89 per km². It covers a total area of 1,116 km².

From the hierarchical point of view of the Catholic Church, it is part of the Diocese of Tacna and Moquegua which, in turn, belongs to the Archdiocese of Arequipa.

== Etymology ==
The name of the valley still generates some uncertainty. Peruvian historian Luis Cavagnaro Orellana indicates that the word Sama is of Hispanic origin and attributes it to the conquistadors who returned from Chile after accompanying Almagro. In December 1536, a group of them, at the proposal of Diego de Rondón, applied the name in honor of an Asturian town in the parish of Sama, head of the ayuntamiento of Langreo in the general district of Laviana, in the old Province of Oviedo.

However, pre-Hispanic linguistic evidence reveals coincidences in that the valley was called Samaraña in Aymara and Samay in Quechua. Among archaeologists and ethnohistorians there is consensus to establish that the term "Sama" has pre-Hispanic origins. It derives its meaning from the concept of land of rest or rested land, alluding to the first farmers who cleared the land after cycles of rest and fertilization.

== History ==
The origins of the district are purely agricultural, with the Camanchacos being its first inhabitants, their work was concentrated on planting corn and potatoes, in addition to fishing. When the Incas arrived in Takana, groups of Quechua mitimaes remained in Sama, who entered into dispute with the original Aymaras. Over time the mitimaes specialized and along with fishing and guano extraction; They grew chili for the Inca on the Quillona farm. The Camino Real passed through the same district. The Incas also built Sama La Antigua to serve as their main administrative centre in the valley.

Before the conquest, the valley had a small population. In 1536, Almagro left Juan de la Flor in the valley, who took possession of what is currently Sama Grande, and Fernando Albarracín Pizarro took possession of Sama Inclán. During the War of the Pacific, the town was occupied by the Chilean Army and administered as the 7th subdelegation of Tacna Department, according to the limits assigned by the Chilean decrees of November 9, 1885 and May 10, 1886.

On November 28, 1920, according to Regional Law No. 14, promulgated by Peruvian President Augusto B. Leguía, Sama was elevated to a district, with its first mayor being Mr. Jesús R. Chavera. This law is ratified by Regional Law No. 498.

=== Chilean administration ===
Sama was administered as an autonomous commune of Chile starting on February 1, 1928, through Decree No. 8583 of January 28, which organised its territory. Alongside the communes of Palca—also created by the same decree—and Tacna, it formed the municipal group of the same name between 1928 and 1929, meaning that, unlike most communes, neither town had a proper local government.

The Chilean commune of Sama ceased its existence alongside Palca and Tacna as of August 28, 1929, when the territory of the Tacna was returned to Peru in a ceremony held at the home of the prefect Federico Fernandini, in which an agreement was signed between the interim mayor of the Chilean province of Tacna, Gonzalo Robles, and a delegation from Peru headed by Foreign Minister Pedro José Rada y Gamio. At 4 p.m. that day, the Peruvian municipality of Tacna began its functions.

=== Recent history ===
In 2000, Sama had a population of 2,406 inhabitants.

It currently houses one of the most prominent valleys in the department, the Sama Valley. An important sugar cane and cotton production area, it focuses its activities on the cultivation of olive trees, corn, chili peppers, quinoa, among others. It is also characterized by the breeding of sheep, cattle, goats, and pigs and is currently considered the "southern cradle of the breeding of the Peruvian Paso horse."

== Geography ==
The Sama valley is located to the northeast of the city approximately 37 km from Tacna. It is currently divided into two parts, Sama-Inclán and Sama-Las Yaras, which have the following characteristics:

Sama-Inclán	Sama-Las Yaras	Morro Sama
It is at 325 meters above sea level, its capital is Sama Grande, on the banks of the river of the same name and flows into the Pacific Ocean; Its climate is dry and its edaphology only allows the harvest of chili, corn, etc. Currently its hills are barren, but in the past they constituted a green setting for livestock and agriculture. In the valley there are no fruit trees due to the soil salinity, the brackish soil and salt water determined its physiography and made its agricultural vocation predominantly livestock.	Located at 312 meters above sea level, it has the same characteristics and soil and climate conditions as Sama-Inclán and is divided into Annexes such as Buena Vista, Miraflores, Las Yaras, Cuilona, El Golpe, etc., on the seashore.	Located 765 meters south-east of La Caleta, this is the highest topographic feature along the coastline, with a convex shape and its Santa Rosa islet, which is home to marine fauna and flora. In the area there are numerous pre-Inca archaeological remains. Its river waters are used only for irrigation, and are not suitable for human consumption due to its high arsenic content; Its slopes are located on the Llocollocone hill.

== Populated centres ==
Demographically, the Sama District is divided into the following population centres:

- Buenavista
- Miraflores
- Las Yaras
- Cuilona
- Valle Bajo
- Vilavila
- Sama (also known as Puerto Grau or Morro Sama)
- Boca del Río

== Authorities ==
=== Mayors ===
- 2023–2026: Richard Santos Calizaya Pimentel, Juntos por Tacna
- 2021–2022: Carlos Alberto Vicente Alférez, Banderas Tacneñistas
- 2019–2021: Milton John Juárez Vera, Perú Patria Segura
- 2015–2018: Wilson Bertolotto Ticona, Movimiento Independiente Regional Fuerza Tacna.
- 2011–2014: Milton John Juarez Vera, Contigo Tacna.
- 2007–2010: Wilson Bertolotto Ticona, Movimiento Independiente Regional Tacna Unida.
- 2003–2006: Wilson Bertolotto Ticona, Alianza Electoral Unidad Nacional.
- 1999–2002: Wilson Bertolotto Ticona, Fuerza y Desarrollo.

=== Regidores ===
- Neptalí Esteban Chire Carpio (Perú Patria Segura)
- Fidel Eduardo Vásquez Delgado (Perú Patria Segura)
- Wilfredo Villalva Ramos (Perú Patria Segura)
- Karen Aliza Vargas Flores (Perú Patria Segura)
- Ricardo Paolo Gonzáles Nina (Banderas Tacneñistas)
- Nicanor Ronal Sánchez Villegas
