= Old Valley of Tacna =

Old Valley of Tacna is a large natural area in Tacna, Peru. It's located between 670 and 1,090 m.a.s.l. It is approximately 23 km long. And the climate is temperate and dry.

It includes the Districts of Pocollay, Calana, and Pachia, which are 94 km, 14 km and 18 km away from the city of Tacna respectively.

Various restaurantes are located there and you can eat traditional food.
