= Tarata, Peru =

City in Peru

Tarata San Benedicto de Tarata
- City
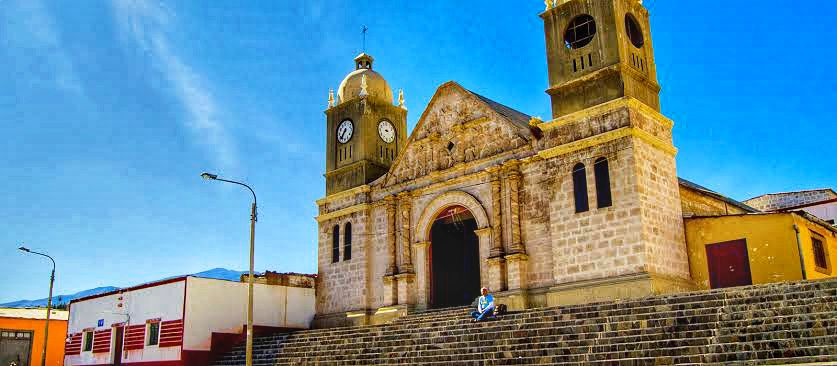
- View of San Benedicto de Abad Church

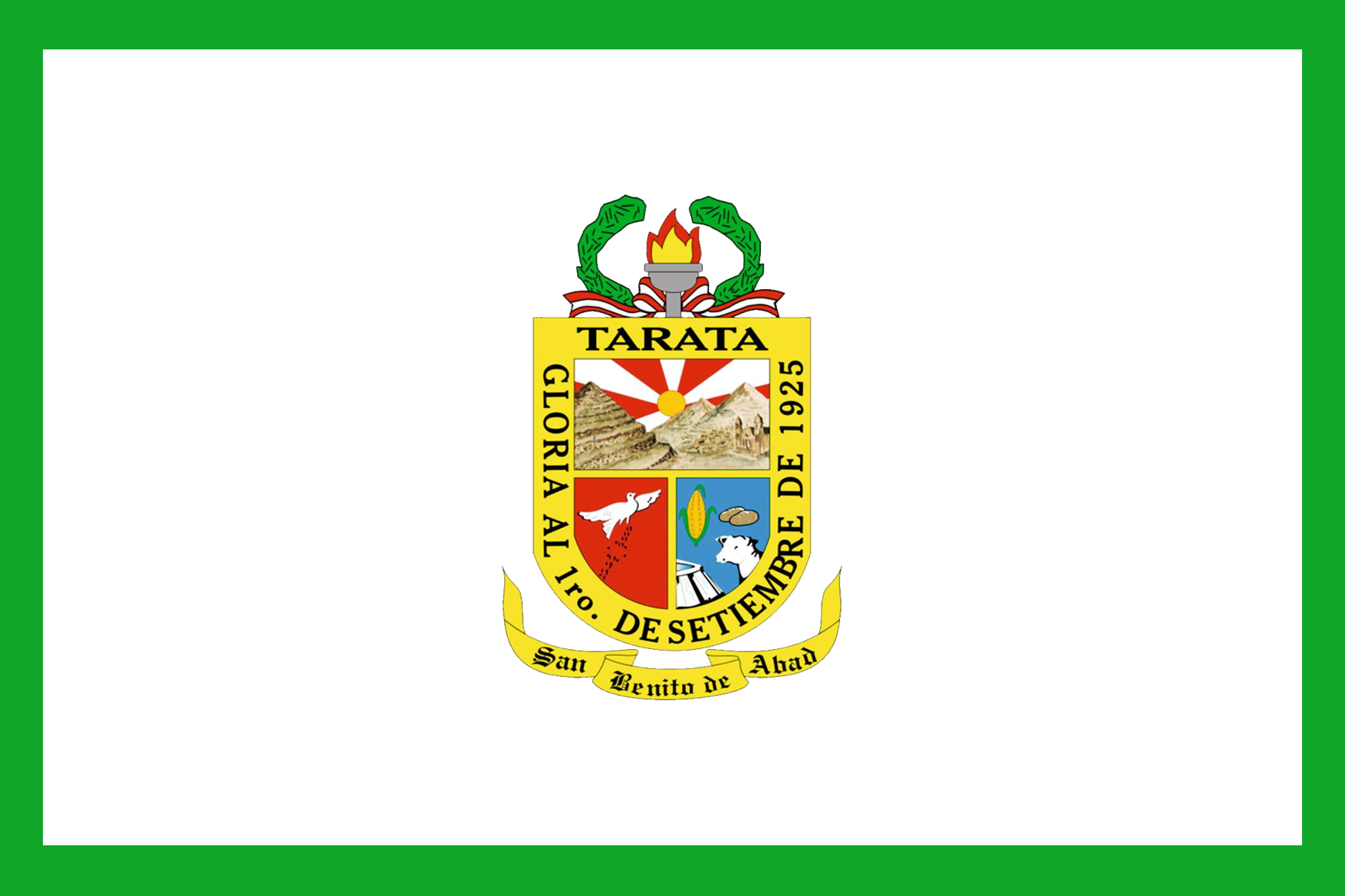
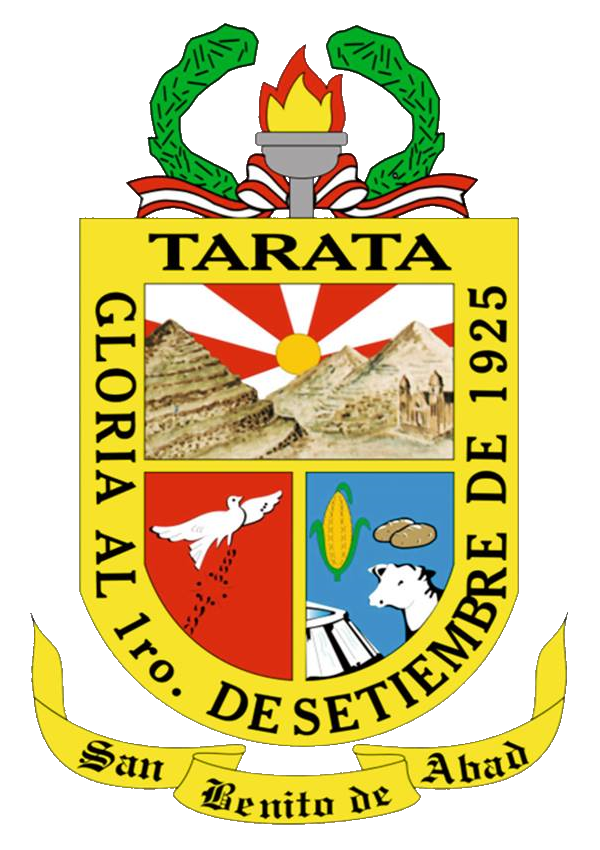
- Flag Coat of arms
- Nickname: Fellowship city (Spanish: Ciudad de la confraternidad)
- Location within Department of Tacna Location within Peru
- Coordinates: 17°28′28.67″S 70°1′57″W
- Country: Peru
- Region: Tacna
- Province: Tarata
- District: Tarata
- Established: January 3, 1741
- Time zone: UTC-5 (PET)
- Website: http://www.munitarata.gob.pe/

Tarata is a city in southern Peru. It is the capital of the district and province of the same name, located in the department of Tacna.

== History ==
=== Pre-Inca Era ===
The works of the archaeologist Rogger Ravines in the Karu cave show a very early settlement of Tarata, around 7000 BC, that is, more or less 9000 years ago. The study of regional cultural development over time is a task that Archeology has yet to develop. Not much is known of Tarata's remote past. The archaeologist Ravines found an Archaic settlement at the site of Kano, high up in the Tarata district, not far from their present city. The petroglyphs and cave paintings stand out in the province of Tarata, for this remote period.

=== Spanish period ===
In 1611 work began on the temple of San Benedicto Abad, patron of the city of Tarata, thus beginning the process of evangelization of the area and in turn the process of acculturation and conversion of the indigenous populations. The temple was officially inaugurated on January 3, 1741, the same day that the Spanish foundation of the city took place.

=== Republican period ===
In 1824, Simón Bolivar decrees the political creation of the district of Tarata, with President Manuel Pardo promulgating decades later the creation of the province of Tarata, on November 12, 1874, as well as its districts: Estike, Tarukachi, Tarata, Tikako and Kandarave.

=== Administration by Chile ===
After the Battle of Tacna, and the subsequent retreat of Peruvian and Bolivian forces, the city was occupied by Chile and incorporated as a commune of the department of Tacna, beginning a process of Chilenisation. The commune was formally established on December 22, 1891, taking into account the limits assigned by the decrees of November 9, 1885 and of May 10, 1886, and was composed of six subdelegations: Pocollai, Pachía, Palca, Tarata, Sama and Calana. A Civil Registry office had operated in the commune since 1885.

Municipality	Sub-delegations
Tarata	Pocollai
Tarata	Pachía
Tarata	Palca
Tarata	Tarata
Tarata	Sama
Tarata	Calana

In 1911, the city was officially incorporated into the Chilean Province of Tacna as the political seat of the department of Tarata. The area, however, was disputed by Peru on continuous occasions due to differing interpretations of the Treaty of Ancón, assisted by the arbitration of the United States. In 1921, Chile abolished the department, with the area's administration returning to its pre-1911 status.

=== Contemporary period ===
On September 1, 1925, Chile returned the city to Peru under the mediation of U.S. President Calvin Coolidge, who enforced the limits agreed upon on the north, which did not include the city.

== Demographics ==
According to the 2007 Peru Census, The city of Tarata had 2,882 inhabitants, of which 2,577 speak Spanish as their native language, this being the most widely spoken language, followed by Aymara with 840 speakers. The predominant age group is children between 10 and 14 years old.

== Geography ==
The region is located below the Titicaca plateau and has a diverse geography, including volcanoes, deserts, and mountainous zones, from which arise rivers that go over the punas and the plateaus, thus forming the hydrographical system of this zone. The region is small in size but has a significant mining and agriculture potential. It has various climates and diverse production.

=== Climate ===
The average climate per year is 8.6°C (47.5°F).

Climate data for Tarata, elevation 3,100 m (10,200 ft), (1991–2020)
Month	Jan	Feb	Mar	Apr	May	Jun	Jul	Aug	Sep	Oct	Nov	Dec	Year
Mean daily maximum °C (°F)	19.8 (67.6)	19.6 (67.3)	20.2 (68.4)	21.0 (69.8)	20.8 (69.4)	20.6 (69.1)	20.3 (68.5)	20.9 (69.6)	21.1 (70.0)	21.1 (70.0)	20.9 (69.6)	20.7 (69.3)	20.6 (69.1)
Mean daily minimum °C (°F)	6.4 (43.5)	6.6 (43.9)	5.5 (41.9)	3.2 (37.8)	1.0 (33.8)	1.0 (33.8)	1.7 (35.1)	2.5 (36.5)	3.4 (38.1)	3.7 (38.7)	4.0 (39.2)	5.3 (41.5)	3.7 (38.7)
Average precipitation mm (inches)	69.1 (2.72)	82.4 (3.24)	36.2 (1.43)	1.9 (0.07)	0.8 (0.03)	0.5 (0.02)	1.0 (0.04)	1.0 (0.04)	1.1 (0.04)	0.4 (0.02)	0.3 (0.01)	12.4 (0.49)	207.1 (8.15)
Source: National Meteorology and Hydrology Service of Peru

== See also ==
- Tarata District
- Tacna Department
