= La Yarada-Los Palos District =

Coordinates: 18.2292°S 70.4769°W

- District
- Location of the La Yarada-Los Palos District in the Tacna province
- Country: Peru
- Region: Tacna
- Province: Tacna
- Founded: 2015
- Capital: Los Palos

Area
  - Total: 2,320 km^{2} (900 sq mi)
- Elevation: 62 m (203 ft)

Population (2005 census)
  - Total: 16,432
  - Density: 7.08/km^{2} (18.3/sq mi)
- Time zone: UTC-5 (PET)

The district of La Yarada Los Palos is one of the 11 districts that constitute the province of Tacna in the Tacna Region, in the south of Peru.

== History ==
On November 7, 2015, the President of Peru promulgated Law No. 30358, law creating the district of Yarada los Palos. The territorial limits of the district were defined as follows:

[...] on the northwest, [the province] limits with the district of Tacna, the limit begins in the coast, in a UTM coordinate point 333 220 m E and 7 985 129 m N; in the northeast it borders the district of Tacna, in the east it borders the district of Tacna, in the south it borders the Republic of Chile, along the frontier line, until its intersection with the Pacific Ocean in the Concordia milestone, point of beginning of the land border, in accordance with the provisions of the Treaty of Lima and its Supplementary Protocol, between Peru and Chile, dated June 3, 1929, and the work of the Mixed Boundary Commission of 1929 and 1930; and from the west, starting from the Concordia point, starting point of the land border with the Republic of Chile, bordering the Pacific Ocean, following the low tide line to a coordinate point UTM 333 220 m E and 7 985 129 m N, starting point of the present description. All this, also, with respect to the maritime boundary with Chile, defined by the ruling of the International Court of Justice of January 27, 2014 and the coordinates determined by virtue of the work carried out by technicians from both countries, which are included in the Minutes. signed in Lima, on March 25, 2014.

Chile protested against the creation of the district due to the dispute between both countries, and declared it null and void in the context of the border between both states.

== Climate ==
Climate data for La Yarada, elevation 30 m (98 ft), (1991–2020)
Month	Jan	Feb	Mar	Apr	May	Jun	Jul	Aug	Sep	Oct	Nov	Dec	Year
Mean daily maximum °C (°F)	27.5 (81.5)	28.0 (82.4)	27.2 (81.0)	25.1 (77.2)	23.0 (73.4)	20.9 (69.6)	19.8 (67.6)	19.8 (67.6)	20.5 (68.9)	22.2 (72.0)	24.0 (75.2)	25.8 (78.4)	23.7 (74.6)
Mean daily minimum °C (°F)	18.8 (65.8)	18.9 (66.0)	17.7 (63.9)	15.6 (60.1)	14.5 (58.1)	14.0 (57.2)	13.7 (56.7)	14.0 (57.2)	14.6 (58.3)	15.4 (59.7)	16.6 (61.9)	17.6 (63.7)	16.0 (60.7)
Average precipitation mm (inches)	0.4 (0.02)	0.4 (0.02)	0.2 (0.01)	0.0 (0.0)	0.0 (0.0)	0.3 (0.01)	1.0 (0.04)	0.9 (0.04)	0.6 (0.02)	0.2 (0.01)	0.0 (0.0)	0.2 (0.01)	4.2 (0.18)
Source: National Meteorology and Hydrology Service of Peru

== See also ==
- Department of Tacna
- Territorial organisation of Peru
- Chilean–Peruvian territorial dispute
