= Avenida San Martín =

Avenue in Tacna

San Martín Avenue
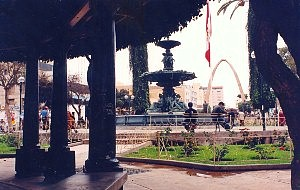
- Main square, located in the avenue
- Namesake: José de San Martín
- From: Alto Lima street
- To: Blondell & Callao streets

San Martín Avenue (Spanish: Avenida San Martín) is the main thoroughfare of the historic centre of Tacna, Peru. It houses landmarks such as the Cathedral, the Parabolic Arch, the Ornamental Fountain, the home of Jorge Basadre and the former Municipal Palace. When it reaches the cathedral, it splits into two avenues: Blondell and Callao. South of the cathedral is the city's main square, which it surrounds.

== History ==
On November 28, 1910, when the city was under Chilean administration, a violent riot took place in the street against El Tacora, a Peruvian newspaper owned by the Freyre family. The family's house was looted, and the people inside the building attacked as well, including the 89-year old Juana Arias de Freyre, who was dragged from her bed. The newspaper's contents were thrown to the street, being cleaned up by Peruvian locals that lived in the building's surroundings.

The Zona Franca de Tacna, a plan to impose a zero-sol tax for imported products, was announced by then president Alan García during his first presidency during a rally in the avenue.

== See also ==
- Tacna Historical Museum
