= Tacna District =

District of Peru

Tacna Taqna (Aymara and Quechua)
- District
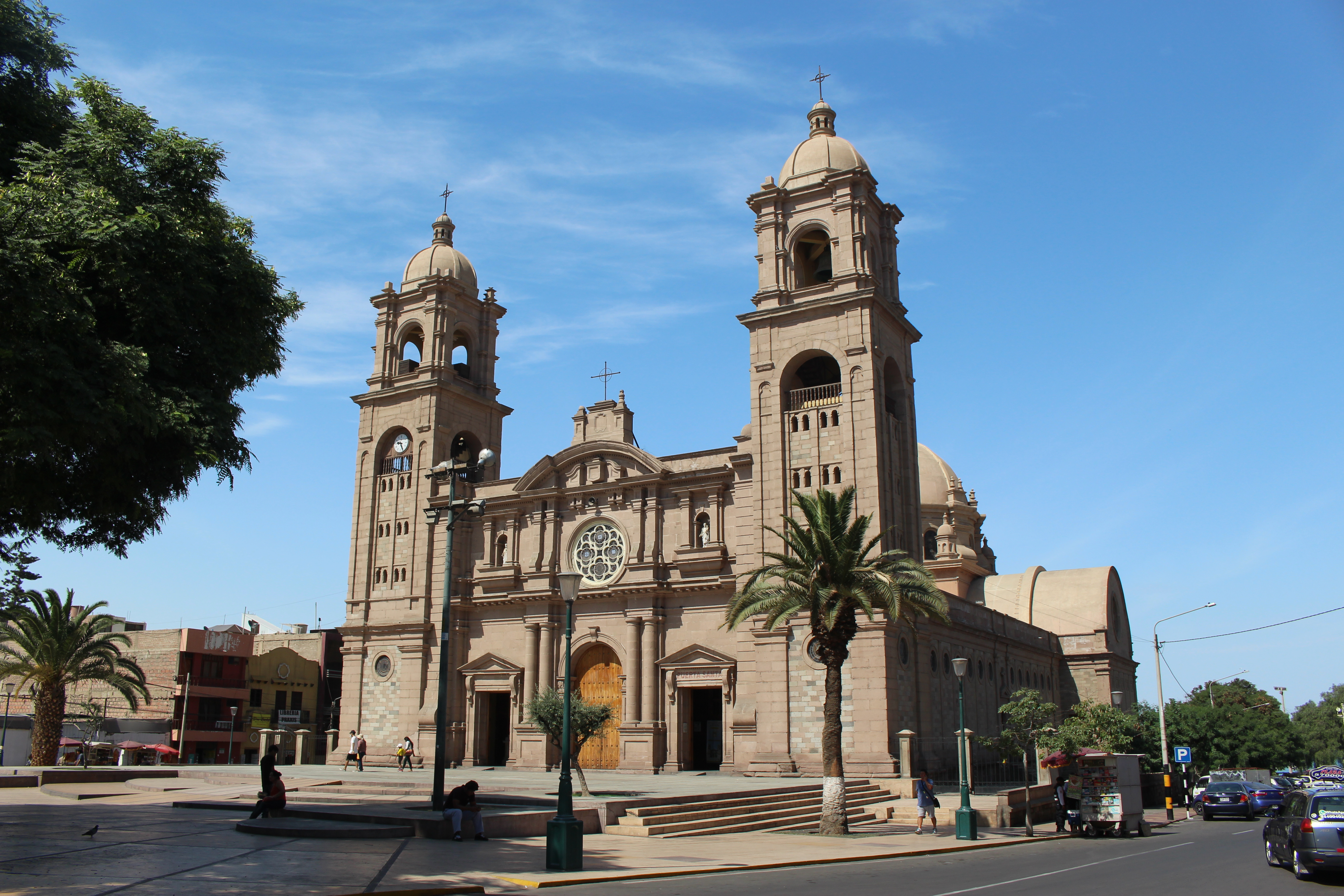
- The Cathedral seen from the city's main square

- Flag

- Location of Tacna within Tacna Province
- Coordinates: 18°1′3″S 70°15′3″W
- Country: Peru
- Region: Tacna
- Province: Tacna
- Capital: Tacna

Government
  - Mayor: Luis Ramón Torres Robledo

Area
  - Total: 2,407.18 km^{2} (929.42 sq mi)
- Elevation: 562 m (1,844 ft)

Population (2005 census)
  - Total: 97,247
  - Density: 40.399/km^{2} (104.63/sq mi)
- Time zone: UTC-5 (PET)
- UBIGEO: 230101

Tacna (Spanish pronunciation: [ˈtaɣna]; Aymara and Quechua: Taqna) is a district of Tacna, a province of the department of Tacna, Peru. Its capital is San Pedro de Tacna.

== Etymology ==
The term Tacna is derived from two Quechua words: Taka, meaning 'to hit', and na, which means 'place'. Thus, the full name means "I hit this place" or "I rule this place".

== Politics ==
=== List of mayors ===
Since 2023, the incumbent mayor is Pascual Milton Güisa Bravo.

== See also ==
- Roman Catholic Diocese of Tacna and Moquegua
- Administrative divisions of Peru
