= Alto de la Alianza District =

Coordinates: 17.9948°S 70.2479°W

Alto de la Alianza Distrito de Alto de la Alianza
- District
- Coat of arms

- Location of Alto de la Alianza in the Tacna Province
- Country: Peru
- Region: Tacna
- Province: Tacna
- Founded: May 9, 1984
- Capital: La Esperanza

Government
  - Mayor: Willy Méndez

Area
  - Total: 371.4 km^{2} (143.4 sq mi)
- Elevation: 620 m (2,030 ft)

Population (2005 census)
  - Total: 35,429
  - Density: 95.39/km^{2} (247.1/sq mi)
- Time zone: UTC-5 (PET)
- UBIGEO: 230102
- Website: munialtoalianza.gob.pe

Alto de la Alianza District is one of ten districts of the province Tacna in Peru.

== Authorities ==
=== Mayors ===
- 2011-2014: Willy Wilson Méndez Chávez.
- 2007-2010: Luis Alberto Mamani Churacutipa.

== Festivities ==
- May Krus
- Our Lady of Copacabana
