= Handover (political) =

Handover, in the political-historical sense refers to the transfer of power such as when one elected government replaces another one, or when control over a territory is transferred.

== Colonial ==
It can mean the transfer of former colonies (particularly those of former British colonies) to the local people. The term was also used for the transfer of the Panama Canal and the canal zone to Panama, and the returns of sovereignty to Iraq by the United States.

- The transfer of sovereignty of Hong Kong, a former British crown colony, from UK to People's Republic of China in 1997. After the handover, Hong Kong became a special administrative regions of China, a first-order division.
- The transfer of sovereignty of Macau from Portugal to People's Republic of China in 1999, with the region becoming a special administrative region.

=== Examples ===
- Handover of Hong Kong
- Handover of Macau
- Handover of the Panama Canal
- Handover of Iraq
- Handover of Tacna
