= Ciudad Nueva District =

Coordinates: 17.9837°S 70.2356°W

Ciudad Nueva
- District
- Coat of arms
- Interactive map of Ciudad Nueva
- Country: Peru
- Region: Tacna
- Province: Tacna
- Founded: November 16, 1992
- Capital: Ciudad Nueva

Government
  - Mayor: Genaro Mario Condori Ramos

Area
  - Total: 173.42 km^{2} (66.96 sq mi)
- Elevation: 650 m (2,130 ft)

Population (2005 census)
  - Total: 35,067
  - Density: 202.21/km^{2} (523.72/sq mi)
- Time zone: UTC-5 (PET)
- UBIGEO: 230104
- Website: municiudadnueva.gob.pe

Ciudad Nueva District is one of ten districts of the province Tacna in Peru.
