= Tacna Ornamental Fountain =

Fountain in Tacna, Peru

Coordinates: 18.0139°S 70.2511°W

- Pileta Ornamental de Tacna
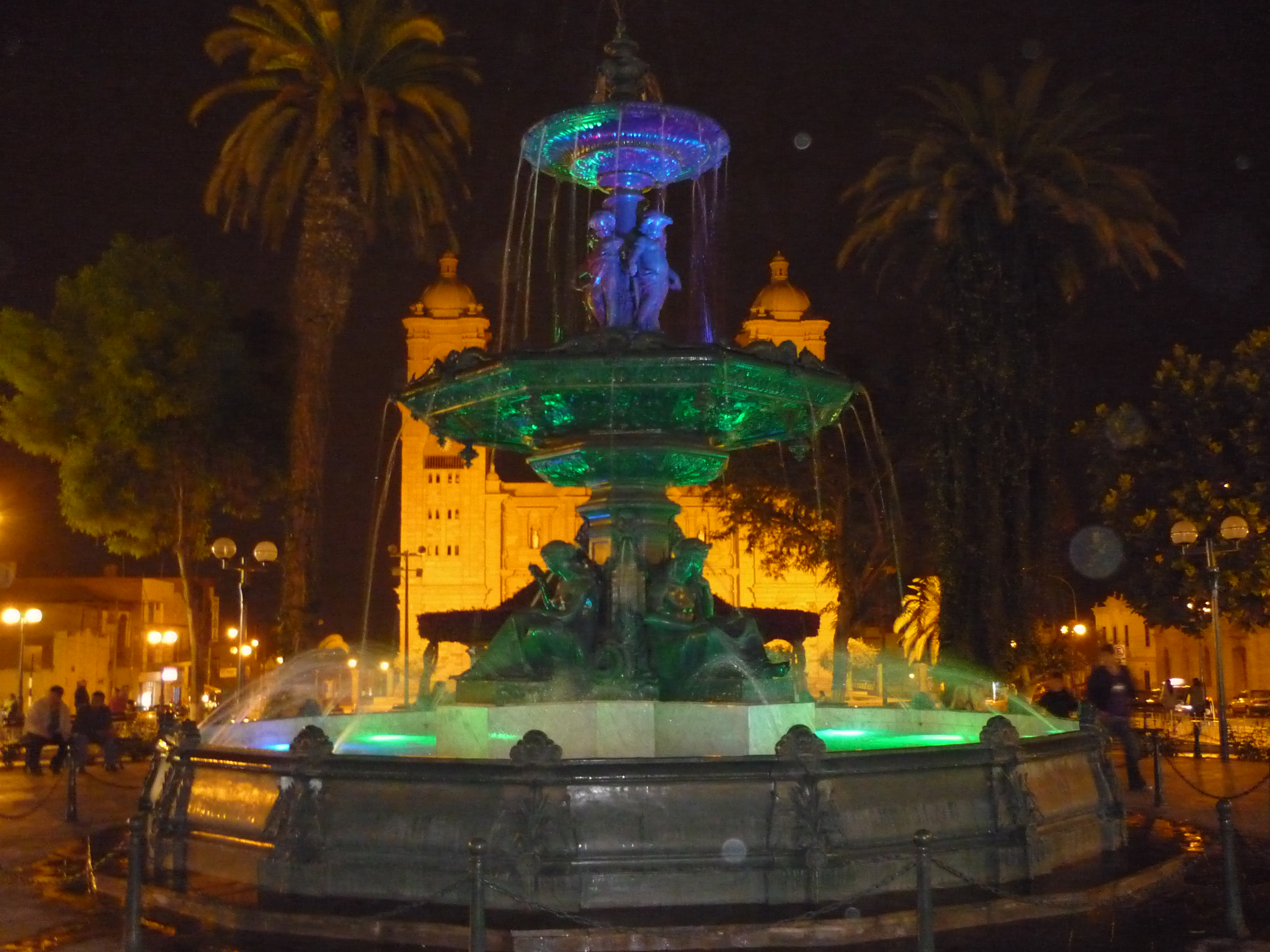
- Location: Tacna, Peru
- Designer: O'Lenhard
- Opening date: 1869

Tacna Ornamental Fountain, is a fountain located in the Paseo Cívico of the centre of the city of Tacna, Peru.

== History ==
There are various stories about this ornamental fountain. The most accepted was that this Pool was designed by the sculptor O'Lenhard and brought from Brussels, by the famous construction company Eiffel. However, it is undeniable that the statues in this fountain are by the French sculptor Mathurin Moreau. There are about twenty identical fountains around the world; Genoa, Boston and two in Buenos Aires's 9 de Julio Avenue.

It is noted that it was acquired and gifted to the city of Tacna by the government of José Balta in 1869 or that it also arrived as part of the Uchusuma River contract. The installation work was carried out by the French technical expert Matias Richet and a Peruvian architect, surnamed Salazar, was in charge of the construction of the stone plinth. On April 19, 1885, the Public Works Department requested proposals for the transfer of the pile, which was directed by Mr. Adolfo Krug. the fountain was then located meters higher than its current location. The work was started by the Peruvian architect Salazar; Upon his death, Mr. Zenón Ramírez concluded the work. During the Chilean Occupation in Tacna, there were several failed attempts to move the fountain to their country.

In 1967, an extensive and valuable repair of the fountain was carried out. The structure was reinforced and welded, the water and drainage system of the fountain, pumping and water recirculation plant, polishing, anticorrosive paint, etc. were changed. However, the restoration works would continue, with Mayor Luis Torres Robledo being the one who would begin the second stage of the Work. Currently being one of the historical attractions that the city of Tacna offers.

In 1969, the 100 Years of the Installation of the Ornamental Pool were commemorated, the mayor at that time, Rómulo Baluarte, had a set of red and green flashing lights installed on the Pool. On December 28, 1972, it was declared Historical Property by the National Institute of Culture through Supreme Resolution No. 2900.

In June 1998, a project to restore the Ornamental Pila was presented, with engineer Tito Chocano Olivera being mayor.

Currently it is the center of attention of several national and foreign tourists and has been a witness to the history and tradition of the city of Tacna.

== See also ==
- Paseo Cívico de Tacna
