= Tacna Parabolic Arch =

War monument in Tacna, Peru

Coordinates: 18.0136°S 70.2506°W

Monumento a los Héroes
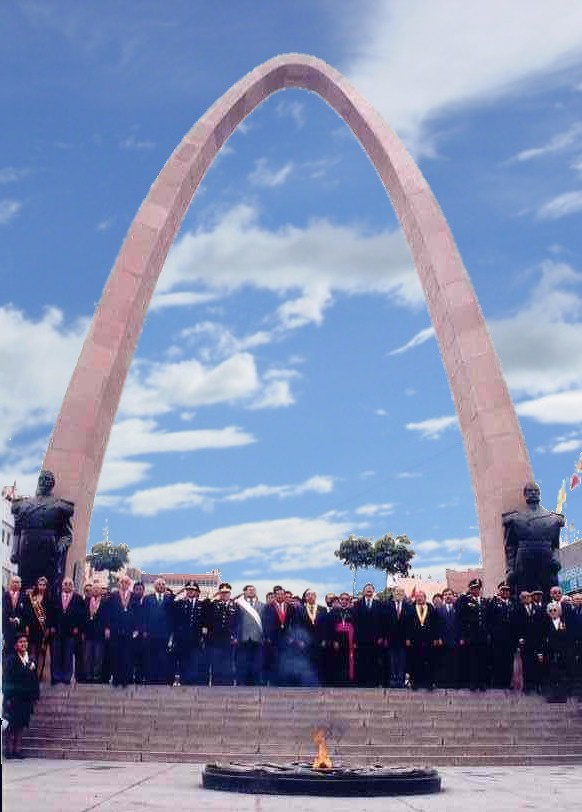
- Location: Paseo Cívico de Tacna
- Type: War monument
- Opening date: August 28, 1957

The Monument to the Heroes (Spanish: Monumento a los Héroes), popularly known as the Parabolic Arch (Spanish: Arco Parabólico), is a quarried pink stone monument located on the Paseo Cívico de Tacna, built in honor of the heroes of the War of the Pacific, Admiral Miguel Grau and Colonel Francisco Bolognesi.

It was inaugurated on August 28, 1957 during the government of Manuel Prado Ugarteche with the name Monument to the heroes Admiral Miguel Grau Seminario and Colonel Francisco Bolognesi (Spanish: Monumento a los héroes Almirante Miguel Grau Seminario y Coronel Francisco Bolognesi).

== History ==
The parabolic arch is a monument located in the civic centre of Tacna, designed by German technicians and donated to the country. It was inaugurated on August 28, 1959 during the government of Manuel Prado Ugarteche, dedicated to Admiral Miguel Grau and Colonel Francisco Bolognesi, both killed during the War of the Pacific and featured as statues. The construction of the monument was made of pinkish-colored stone measuring 18 metres high. This monument stands out for its breaking style with historical classicism and the architectural and urban conservatism of the surroundings. Some historians point out that due to its shape it represents the trajectory of a cannonball fired into the sky and others claim that it is the shape of the civic walk.

On September 29, 2016, the Central Reserve Bank of Peru put into circulation the 1 Sol coin alluding to the arch as the twenty-sixth and last of the Numismatic Wealth and Pride of Peru series.

On August 23, 2018, the Ministry of Culture declared the Monument as Cultural Heritage of the Nation.

== See also ==
- Avenida San Martín
- Paseo Cívico de Tacna
