= Paseo Cívico de Tacna =

Main square of Tacna, Peru

Coordinates: 18°00′50″S 70°15′04″W

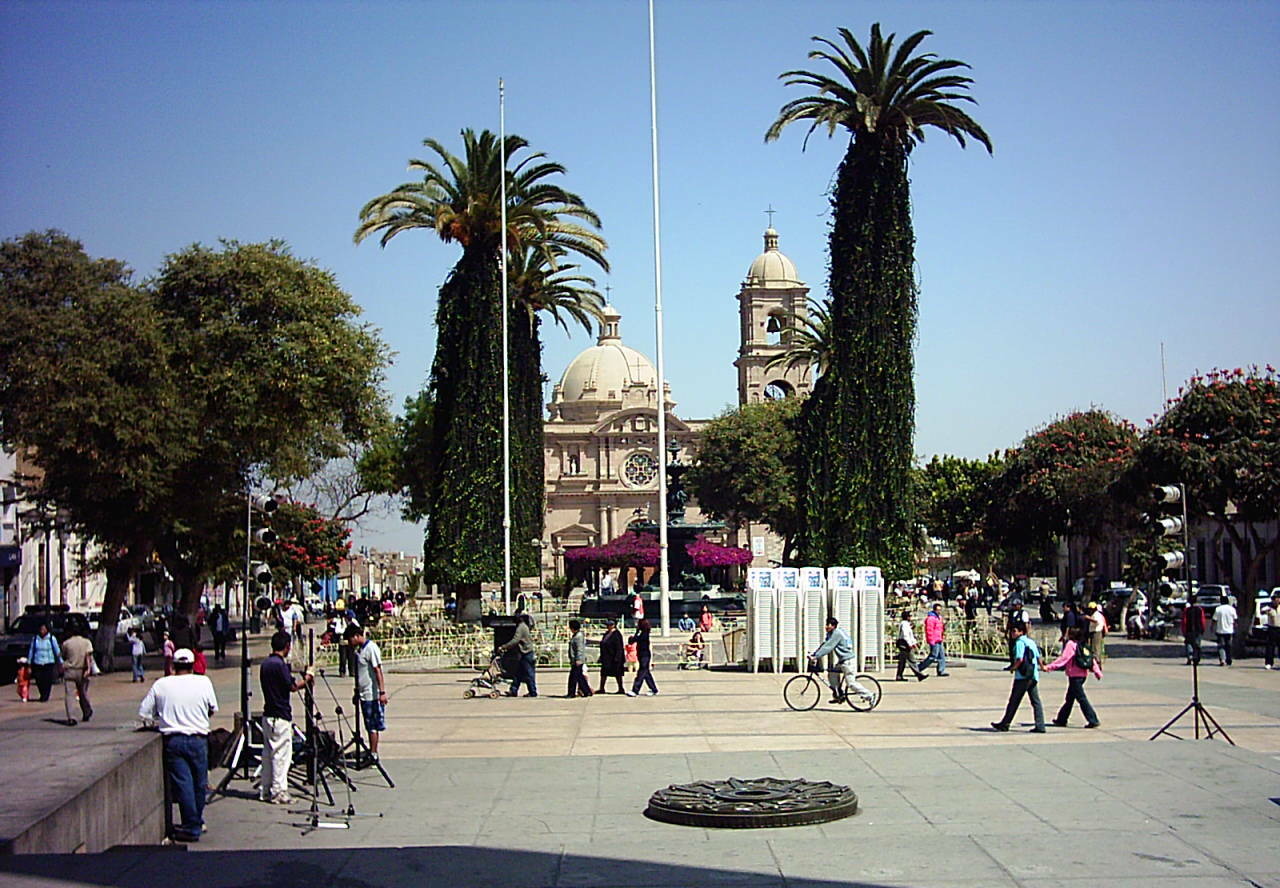
The square in 2005

The Paseo Cívico de Tacna, formerly known as the Plazuela de la Matriz during the Spanish era and as the Plaza Colón from 1892 to 1957, is the main square of the historic centre of Tacna, Peru. It features landmarks such as the city's cathedral, the Monument to Heroes and the city fountain, delimited by San Martín Avenue.

Important civic events in the city are carried out in the square: every Sunday of the civic calendar, in the midst of civic ceremonies, the national flag is raised and the oath of Francisco Bolognesi is renewed, culminating in a civic-military parade of the different educational, public and private entities.

August 28 is the end point of the Flag Procession, where it culminates with the raising of the flag after walking through the streets of the city, celebrating the Reincorporation of Tacna to Peru after almost 50 years of Chilean occupation.

== See also ==
- Avenida San Martín
