= Tacna =

City in Peru

Tacna Taqna (Aymara and Quechua) San Pedro de Tacna
- City
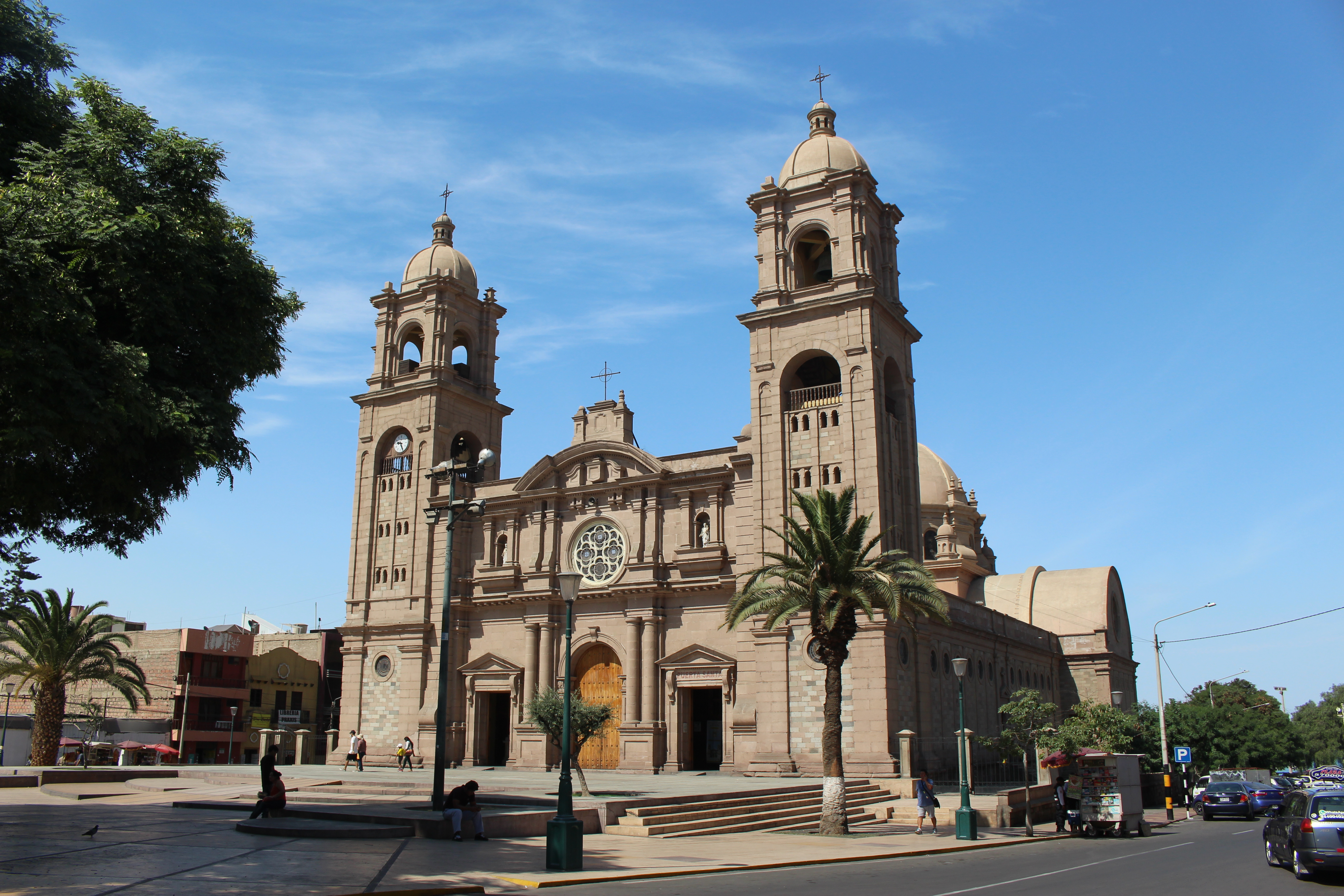
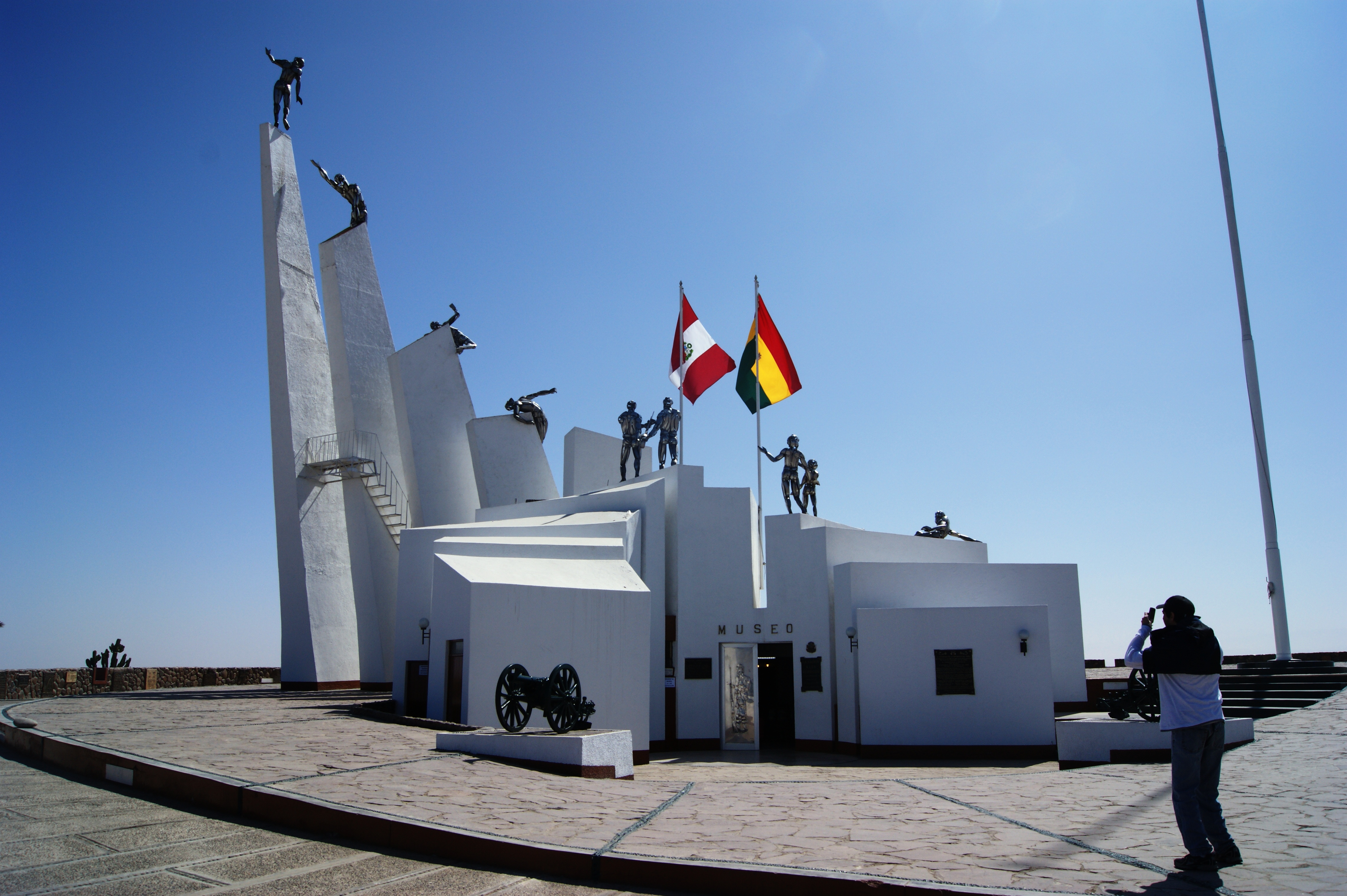
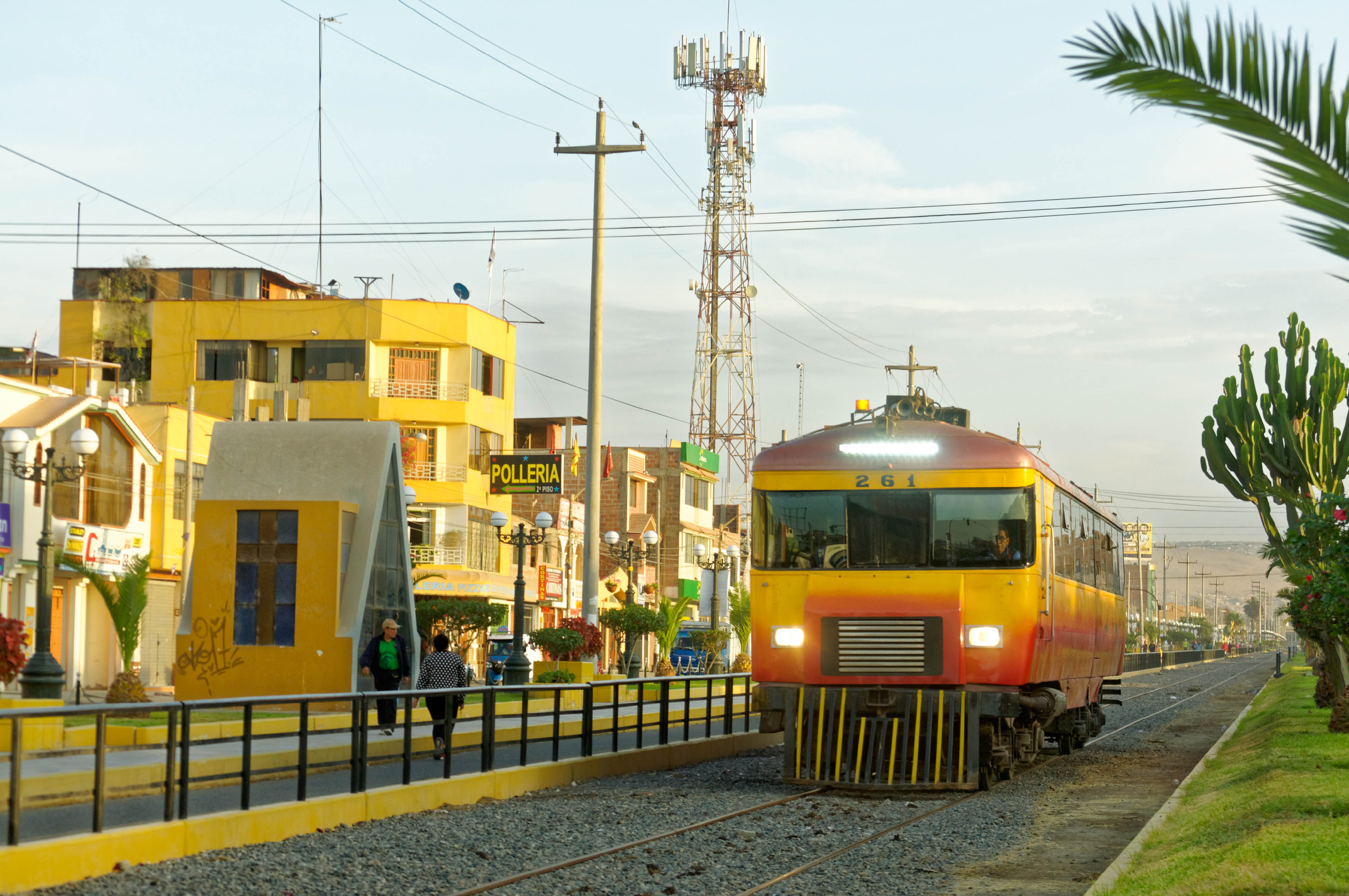
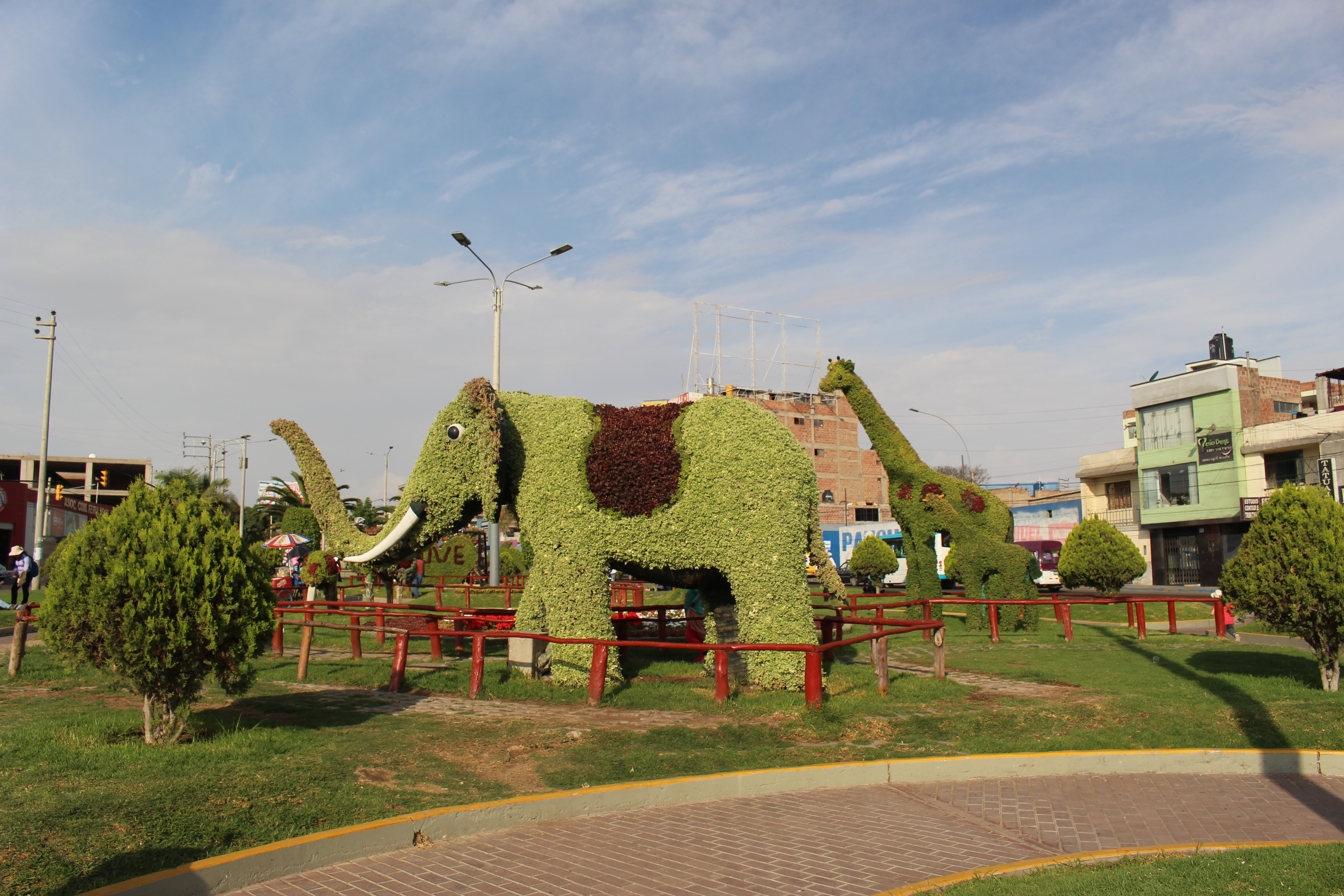
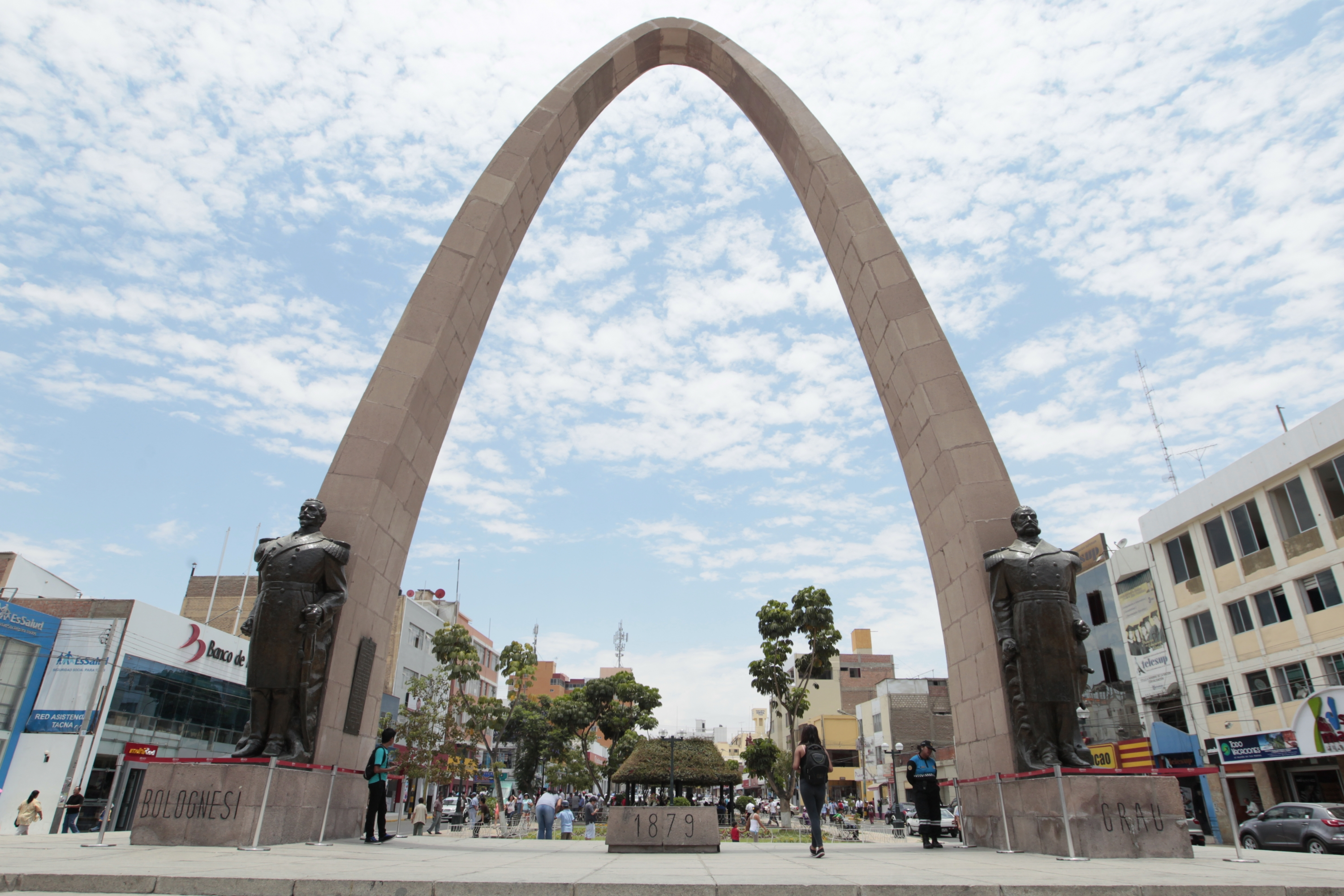
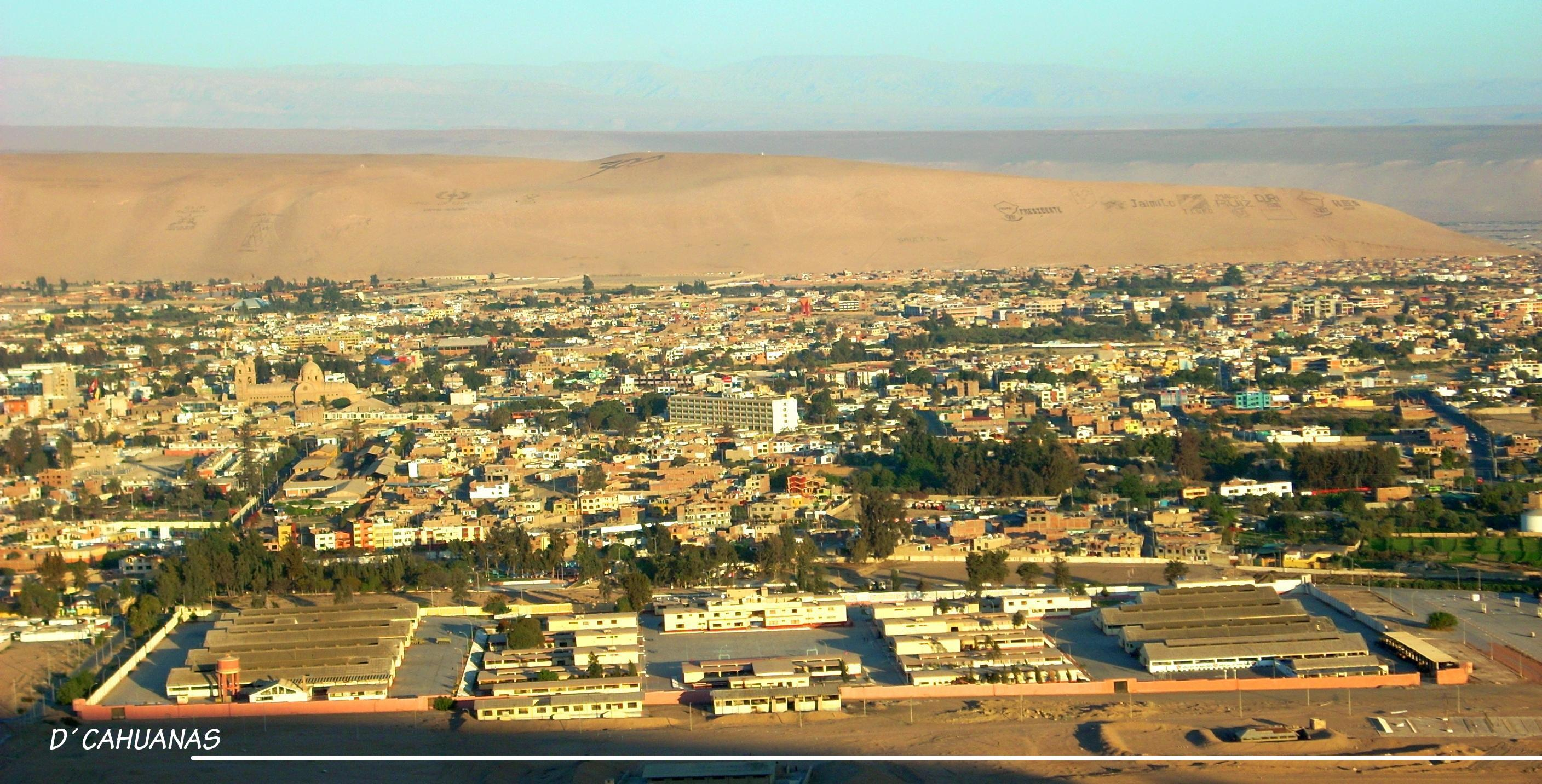
- Clockwise from top: Tacna Cathedral. Alto de la Alianza museum, Tacna railway, Topiario park, Arco Parabólico and panoramic view of Tacna

- Flag Coat of arms
- Nickname: La Ciudad Heroica (The Heroic City)
- Interactive map of Tacna
- Location within Department of Tacna Location within Peru
- Coordinates: 18°03′20″S 70°14′54″W
- Country: Peru
- Department: Tacna
- Province: Tacna
- District: Tacna
- Established: 29 June 1541

Government
  - Mayor: Julio Daniel Medina Castro (2019–2022)

Area
  - Total: 14,766.63 km^{2} (5,701.43 sq mi)
- Elevation: 552 m (1,811 ft)

Population (2017)
  - Total: 286,240
  - Estimate (2015): 293,116
  - Density: 19.384/km^{2} (50.205/sq mi)
- Demonym: Tacneño/a
- Time zone: UTC-5 (PET)
- UBIGEO: 23000
- Area code: 52
- Website: munitacna.gob.pe

Tacna (Spanish pronunciation: [ˈtaɣna]; Aymara and Quechua: Taqna), officially San Pedro de Tacna, is a city in southern Peru and the capital of the department of Tacna. Located in the Caplina River valley about 35 km (22 mi) north of the border with Chile, it is one of the country's main commercial centers and Peru's tenth most populous city. Known for its strong patriotic identity, Tacna features numerous monuments and place names commemorating Peru's independence and the War of the Pacific. Its inhabitants are known as tacneños.

== Etymology ==
The term Tacna is derived from two Quechua words: Taka, meaning 'to hit', and na, which means 'place'. Thus, the full name means "I hit this place" or "I rule this place".

== History ==
=== Pre-Columbian era ===
Historical affiliations

Spain (1542–1811, 1811–1821)
American Union (1811)
Protectorate of Peru (1821–1822)
Peru (1822–1836)
Peru–Bolivia (1836–1839; capital)
Peru (1839–1841)
Bolivia (1841; occupation)
Peru (1841–1880)
Chile (1880–1929; administration)
Peru (1929–present)

At the time of the Spanish conquest, the region around Tacna was already multiethnic, displaying a mix of local sedentary populations and mitma settlers from the Altiplano. The proportions of these are that the first made up about 66% of the population and the latter 25%. Fishing-oriented people known as Camanchacos made up about the remaining 9% of the population. Much of the population practising agriculture is believed to have spoken the Puquina language. In 1540 the encomienda system was established in Tacna and its surroundings with conquistador Lucas Martínez de Vegaso obtaining 1,638 encomienda indians (a third of tributaries distributed). Pedro Pizarro and Pedro de la Fuente followed in numbers receiving each approximately 600 tributaries.

=== Colonial era ===
Francisco Antonio de Zela, a royal accountant (similar in function to a modern-day income tax auditor), initiated the push for Peruvian Independence from Spain in 1811 in Tacna, leading to a series of commemorative actions for the city, culminating in the 1828 declaration of Tacna as the "Heroic City" (La Heroica Ciudad de San Pedro de Tacna) by President José de La Mar.

=== Republican era ===
Tacna was the capital of the short-lived Peru–Bolivian Confederation (1836–1839).

The city was once known for its mining industry; it had significant deposits of sodium nitrate and other resources. Its economic prosperity attracted a wave of immigrants from Italy. Today, their Italian Peruvian descendants live in the city and many of them still have Italian surnames. This era of successful commerce and agriculture ended drastically with the start of the War of the Pacific. Hosting a large Peru-Bolivian army under poor sanitary conditions the city lost a substantial part of its population to infectious diseases before its capture by Chile in May 1880 following a defeat of the allied army in the outskirts of the city by a Chilean force under General Manuel Baquedano.

==== Chilean administration ====
During the war, Tacna—as well as neighbouring Arica—was administered by the Chilean Army and incorporated as a commune that served as the seat of the eponymous department and province. In modern Peruvian historiography, this period is known as the cautiverio. The Treaty of Ancón was signed in 1883 between Peru and Chile, ending the war. Under the terms of the treaty, Chile was to administer the provinces of Tacna and Arica for ten years, taking control of valuable mineral deposits, after which a plebiscite was to be held to determine the region's sovereignty. But when the ten years had elapsed, the two sides could not agree whether to include a large number of imported Chilean laborers in the vote. Throughout the administration, Chilean groups and authorities led a campaign of Chilenization in an attempt to persuade the local population to abandon their Peruvian past and accept Chilean nationality. However, Peruvian nationalists ensured that the Chilean propaganda failed and the planned plebiscite was never held.

The commune was formally created through a decree on 22 December 1891, taking into account the limits assigned by the decrees of 9 November 1885 and 10 May 1886, and was composed of four subdelegations: El Callao, San Ramón, El Mercado and El Alto de Lima.

| Municipality | Sub-delegations (1891) |
|---|---|
| Tacna | El Callao |
| Tacna | San Ramón |
| Tacna | El Mercado |
| Tacna | El Alto de Lima |

According to the 1907 census, the population that year was numbered at 10,593 people. During this period, people such as Jorge Basadre and Salvador Allende (as well as his family) lived in the city.

On 27 February 1927, a mudslide began at the Quebrada del Diablo at 4 p.m., following a continuous period of unusual heavy rain and lightning that began at 10 a.m. It was described at 4 to 5 metres in height and, once it reached a point known as Piedra Blanca, its path bifurcated, with most of the volume headed towards Arunta hill, while a lesser amount travelled through a dry river's path, where garbage would be disposed of, in the Quebrada de Karamolle. The flooding stopped short of the city's cemetery.

Starting on 1 February 1928, by virtue of Decree with Force of Law No. 8,583 published that 28 January under the government of Carlos Ibáñez del Campo, the commune of Tacna was composed of three subdelegations: Intendencia, Comercio and Pocollay. This decree also ordered the creation of the communes of Palca and Sama, which together with Tacna formed a single municipal group; That is, neither Palca and Sama had their own communal government as in most communes in Chile.

| Municipality | Sub-delegations (1928) |
|---|---|
| Tacna | Intendencia |
| Tacna | Comercio |
| Tacna | Pocollay |

In 1929, the Treaty of Lima was signed in which Chile kept Arica, whilst Peru reacquired Tacna and received a $6 million indemnity and other concessions. The commune ceased to exist when the treaty became effective on 28 August, in a ceremony held at the home of the prefect Federico Fernandini, in which an agreement was signed between the interim mayor of the Chilean province of Tacna, Gonzalo Robles, and a delegation of Peru headed by Foreign Minister Pedro José Rada y Gamio. At 4 p.m. that day, the Peruvian municipality of Tacna began its functions.

==== Present ====
Today, Tacna is a mostly commercial city with many migrants from the Puno Region living there. Its economy is based on mercantile activities with the north of Chile (Arica and Iquique). Since it is part of a duty-free zone, Tacna has come to rival Arequipa as southern Peru's main business area. The city has one of the largest artifact markets in the world with imports from Japan and China, and traditional Peruvian handicrafts.

On 30 January 2019, flooding affected the Quebrada de Karamolle for the first time since 1927.

== Geography ==
The area is generally desert, with a few fertile spots near the mountains. Except for Caplina, no rivers cross the entire province.

=== Climate ===
Tacna has a desert climate (BWk/BWh, according to the Köppen climate classification).

Climate data for Tacna (Jorge Basadre), elevation 560 m (1,840 ft), (1991–2020 normals, extremes 1949–present)
| Month | Jan | Feb | Mar | Apr | May | Jun | Jul | Aug | Sep | Oct | Nov | Dec | Year |
|---|---|---|---|---|---|---|---|---|---|---|---|---|---|
| Record high °C (°F) | 33.0 (91.4) | 33.2 (91.8) | 33.8 (92.8) | 31.0 (87.8) | 31.3 (88.3) | 30.1 (86.2) | 31.6 (88.9) | 28.0 (82.4) | 27.8 (82.0) | 29.2 (84.6) | 30.0 (86.0) | 30.0 (86.0) | 33.8 (92.8) |
| Mean daily maximum °C (°F) | 27.8 (82.0) | 28.5 (83.3) | 27.4 (81.3) | 24.8 (76.6) | 22.1 (71.8) | 19.9 (67.8) | 19.0 (66.2) | 19.6 (67.3) | 20.9 (69.6) | 22.9 (73.2) | 24.6 (76.3) | 26.3 (79.3) | 23.7 (74.6) |
| Daily mean °C (°F) | 22.5 (72.5) | 23.1 (73.6) | 22.1 (71.8) | 19.9 (67.8) | 17.5 (63.5) | 15.6 (60.1) | 14.7 (58.5) | 15.1 (59.2) | 16.2 (61.2) | 17.8 (64.0) | 19.4 (66.9) | 21.0 (69.8) | 18.7 (65.7) |
| Mean daily minimum °C (°F) | 17.2 (63.0) | 17.7 (63.9) | 16.7 (62.1) | 14.9 (58.8) | 12.9 (55.2) | 11.2 (52.2) | 10.4 (50.7) | 10.6 (51.1) | 11.4 (52.5) | 12.6 (54.7) | 14.1 (57.4) | 15.6 (60.1) | 13.8 (56.8) |
| Record low °C (°F) | 7.6 (45.7) | 10.0 (50.0) | 6.1 (43.0) | 3.9 (39.0) | 3.9 (39.0) | 0.4 (32.7) | 0.0 (32.0) | 3.9 (39.0) | 3.9 (39.0) | 6.1 (43.0) | 7.2 (45.0) | 7.2 (45.0) | 0.0 (32.0) |
| Average precipitation mm (inches) | 3.5 (0.14) | 2.3 (0.09) | 0.8 (0.03) | 0.2 (0.01) | 0.5 (0.02) | 2.0 (0.08) | 3.9 (0.15) | 4.2 (0.17) | 4.0 (0.16) | 1.4 (0.06) | 0.9 (0.04) | 1.3 (0.05) | 25 (1) |
| Average precipitation days (≥ 1.0 mm) | 0.0 | 0.2 | 0.0 | 0.0 | 0.0 | 0.3 | 0.9 | 1.2 | 0.3 | 0.4 | 0.0 | 0.0 | 3.4 |
| Average relative humidity (%) | 66 | 65 | 67 | 72 | 76 | 78 | 77 | 78 | 75 | 74 | 71 | 68 | 72 |
| Mean monthly sunshine hours | 217.0 | 197.8 | 229.4 | 222.0 | 176.7 | 162.0 | 173.6 | 189.1 | 147.0 | 232.5 | 243.0 | 248.0 | 2,438.1 |
| Mean daily sunshine hours | 7.0 | 7.0 | 7.4 | 7.4 | 5.7 | 5.4 | 5.6 | 6.1 | 4.9 | 7.5 | 8.1 | 8.0 | 6.7 |
Source 1: National Meteorology and Hydrology Service of Peru
Source 2: Meteo Climat (record highs and lows)Deutscher Wetterdienst (precipitation days 1970–1990, humidity 1951–1969, and sun 1930–1937)

== Tourist attractions ==
Many monuments are located in this city, including the arch of the Alto de la Alianza Monumental Complex and the Tacna Parabolic Arch.

Other monuments include a neo-renaissance Cathedral, the Courthouse, the Alameda Bolognesi and the caves of Toquepala, where archaeologists have found some of the oldest human remains in Peru. Another important tourist attraction is the Town Hall Theater, the most emblematic theater in Tacna. Its construction was promoted after the construction of the Tacna–Arica railway in 1856, as theater companies traveling to La Paz passed through Tacna on their way to Bolivia. Taking advantage of this situation, Colonel Cesáreo Vargas, together with Italian businessman Pablo Ferreti, requested permission from the municipality to construct a theater. By 1862, the theater was already operating, although only its first floor had been completed.

== Festivities ==
The most important festivity in the city is the Semana de Tacna ("Tacna Week"), which runs from August 25–30.

On 28 August, a large Peruvian flag is shown throughout the city during the Paseo de la Bandera, which celebrates the anniversary of the reincorporation of Tacna into Peruvian sovereignty and is one of the most important patriotic demonstrations in the whole country. This tradition started in 1901, during the Chilean administration of Tacna, by a group of tacneños who defied the prohibition of showing Peruvian flags imposed by the Chilean authorities.

There is an agrarian and industrial fair as part of these celebrations.

In September, the festival of the Señor de Locumba is celebrated, which draws thousands of faithful people from all over the world.

Due to migration from the Puno region and neighboring Bolivia, religious festivities such as those honoring the Virgen de la Candelaria and the Virgen de Copacabana are also celebrated in Tacna. The celebration in honor of the Virgen de Copacabana takes place in the district of Ciudad Nueva in July.

== Transport ==
=== Rail ===
Tacna was served by a cross-border 1,435 mm (4 ft 8 1/2 in) standard gauge railway to Arica, Chile. The line closed in 2012, but as of June 2014, there were plans to reopen it. It is also the location of the National Railway Museum of Peru.

=== Air ===
Tacna is served by the Crnl. FAP. Carlos Ciriani Santa Rosa International Airport, with flights to Arequipa and Lima.

=== Road ===
Tacna is also served by Peru Highway 1 which heads south to Arica and north to Moquegua.

== Gallery ==
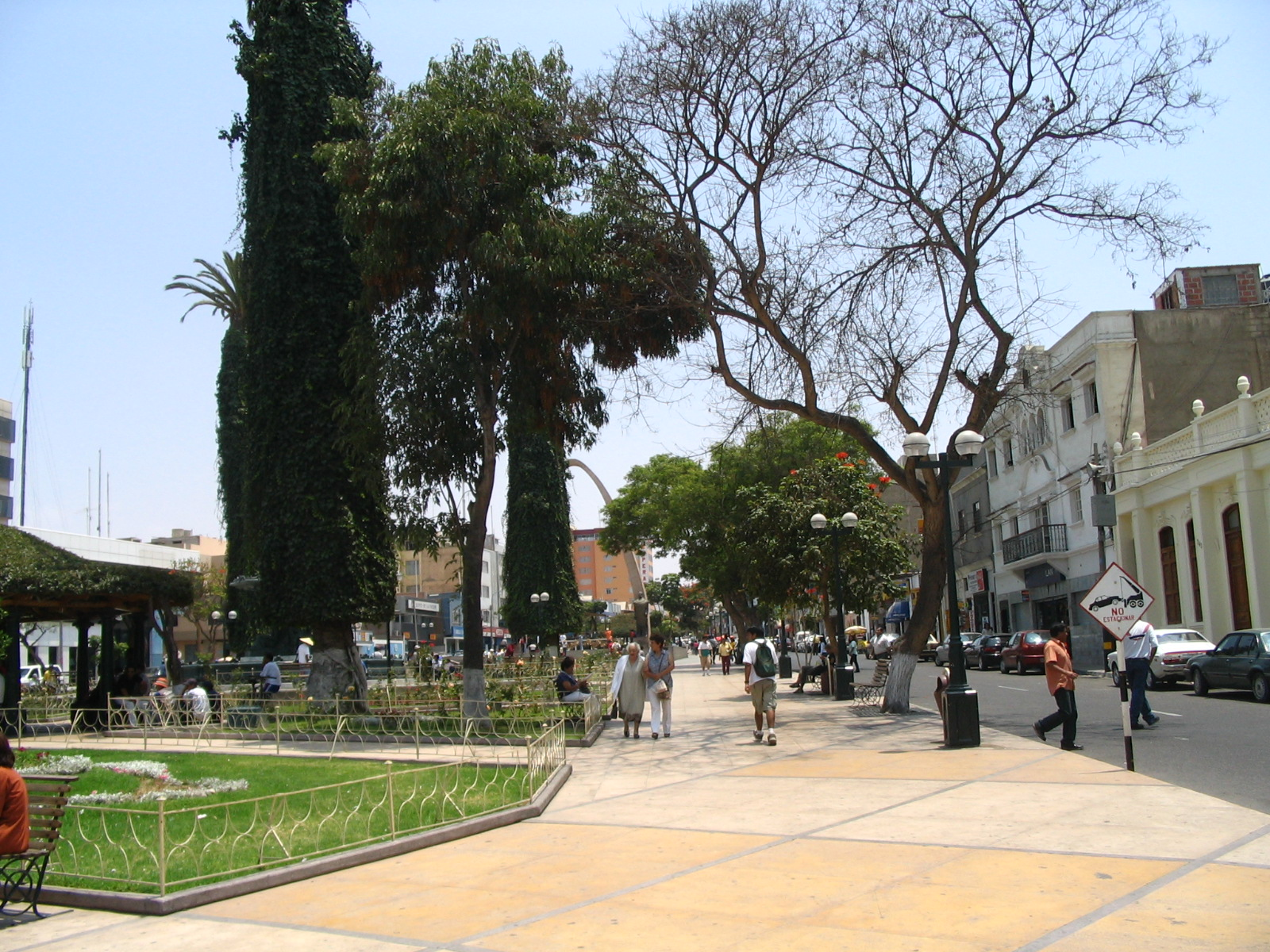
Main square in San Martin area

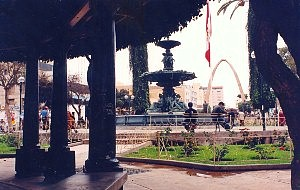
Arco Parabólico, Pileta and Glorieta de Tacna, located in the Av. San Martín

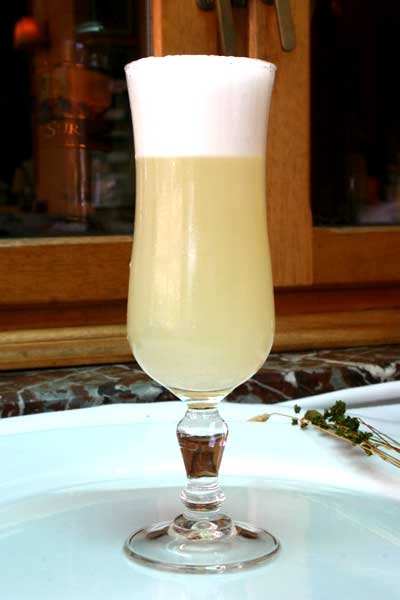
Coctel Mercado Viejo

== See also ==
- 2001 southern Peru earthquake
- Tacna Departament
- Tacna Province
- Tacna District
- Tarata
- Tacna during Chilean administration (1883–1929)
- Diocese of Tacna y Moquegua
