= Inclán District =

Coordinates: 17.7950°S 70.4950°W

Inclán
- District
- Interactive map of Inclán
- Country: Peru
- Region: Tacna
- Province: Tacna
- Founded: November 24, 1955
- Capital: Sama Grande

Government
  - Mayor: José Jorge Chavez Rejas

Area
  - Total: 1,414.82 km^{2} (546.27 sq mi)
- Elevation: 550 m (1,800 ft)

Population (2005 census)
  - Total: 2,802
  - Density: 1.980/km^{2} (5.129/sq mi)
- Time zone: UTC-5 (PET)
- UBIGEO: 230105

Inclán District is one of ten districts of the province Tacna in Peru.

== Climate ==
Climate data for Sama Grande, Inclán, elevation 529 m (1,736 ft), (1991–2020)
Month	Jan	Feb	Mar	Apr	May	Jun	Jul	Aug	Sep	Oct	Nov	Dec	Year
Mean daily maximum °C (°F)	28.5 (83.3)	29.2 (84.6)	28.4 (83.1)	26.5 (79.7)	24.5 (76.1)	22.2 (72.0)	21.2 (70.2)	21.7 (71.1)	22.8 (73.0)	24.3 (75.7)	25.9 (78.6)	27.2 (81.0)	25.2 (77.4)
Mean daily minimum °C (°F)	16.8 (62.2)	17.1 (62.8)	15.9 (60.6)	14.3 (57.7)	12.6 (54.7)	11.2 (52.2)	10.5 (50.9)	10.6 (51.1)	11.4 (52.5)	12.5 (54.5)	13.9 (57.0)	15.3 (59.5)	13.5 (56.3)
Average precipitation mm (inches)	2.9 (0.11)	1.0 (0.04)	0.8 (0.03)	1.2 (0.05)	1.6 (0.06)	1.8 (0.07)	2.5 (0.10)	3.2 (0.13)	4.6 (0.18)	2.1 (0.08)	1.4 (0.06)	2.3 (0.09)	25.4 (1)
Source: National Meteorology and Hydrology Service of Peru
