= Regional Government of Tacna =

Regional government in Peru

- Gobierno Regional de Tacna

Regional Government overview
- Formed: January 1, 2003; 22 years ago
- Jurisdiction: Department of Tacna
- Website: Government site

The Regional Government of Tacna (Spanish: Gobierno Regional de Tacna; GORE Tacna) is the regional government that represents the Department of Tacna. It is the body with legal identity in public law and its own assets, which is in charge of the administration of provinces of the department in Peru. Its purpose is the social, cultural and economic development of its constituency. It is based in the city of Tacna.

== List of representatives ==
Governor	Political party	Period
Julio Alva Centurión	APRA	January 1, 2003–December 31, 2006
Hugo Froilan Ordóñez Salazar	Alianza Por Tacna	January 1, 2007–December 31, 2010
Tito Chocano Olivera	Acción Popular	January 1, 2011–December 31, 2014
Omar Jiménez Flores	Movimiento Cívico Peruano	January 1, 2015–December 31, 2018
Juan Tonconi	Acción por la Unidad Tacna	January 1, 2019–December 31, 2022
Luis Torres Robledo	Movimiento Independiente Regional Fuerza Tacna	January 1, 2023–June 14, 2023
Liliana Velazco Cornejo	Movimiento Independiente Regional Fuerza Tacna	June 14, 2023–June 24, 2023
Luis Torres Robledo	Movimiento Independiente Regional Fuerza Tacna	June 24, 2023–Incumbent

== See also ==
- Regional Governments of Peru
- Department of Tacna
