= Pocollay District =

Coordinates: 17°59′49″S 70°13′17″W

Pocollay
- District
- Location of Pocollay in the Tacna Province
- Country: Peru
- Region: Tacna
- Province: Tacna
- Founded: January 15, 1959
- Capital: Pocollay

Government
  - Mayor: Fausto Foraquita Mendoza

Area
  - Total: 265.65 km^{2} (102.57 sq mi)
- Elevation: 670 m (2,200 ft)

Population (2005 census)
  - Total: 15,503
  - Density: 58.359/km^{2} (151.15/sq mi)
- Time zone: UTC-5 (PET)
- UBIGEO: 230108

Pocollay District is one of ten districts of the province Tacna in Peru.
