= Tacna Courthouse =

- Interactive map of the Tacna Courthouse area

General information
- Location: Tacna, Peru
- Coordinates: 18.0105°S 70.253°W
- Completed: 1902

Design and construction
- Architect: Alberto Figini

The Tacna Courthouse (Casa Jurídica) is located in the city of Tacna in Peru. The building played an important role in transferring the town from Chile to Peru in 1929.

== History ==
The building was built in 1902 to a design by the Italian architect Alberto Figini. In 1926 the town was part of Chile, but this building was purchased by the Peruvian government to house the administration required to allow the town to prepare to become part of Peru.

On August 28, 1929, in this building the parties signed the Act transferring Tacna to Peru. The deal had been negotiated by President Herbert Hoover to resolve a long-standing border dispute between Peru and Chile. Since 1880 the city of Tacna had belonged to Chile. In 1929 it was agreed that Peru would now include the city of Tacna, whereas Arica was confirmed as part of Chile.

The courthouse is open to the public and it contains the Reincorporation Museum, the Tacna Art Gallery, and the Historic Departmental Archives.
