= Coronel Gregorio Albarracín Lanchipa District =

Coordinates: 18.0397°S 70.2541°W

Coronel Gregorio Albarracín Lanchipa
- District
- Location of Coronel Gregorio Albarracín Lanchipa in the Tacna Province
- Country: Peru
- Region: Tacna
- Province: Tacna
- Founded: February 2, 2001
- Capital: Alfonso Ugarte

Government
  - Mayor: Victor Napoleon Cabrera Zolla

Area
  - Total: 187.74 km^{2} (72.49 sq mi)
- Elevation: 560 m (1,840 ft)

Population (2005 census)
  - Total: 58,549
  - Density: 311.86/km^{2} (807.72/sq mi)
- Time zone: UTC-5 (PET)
- UBIGEO: 230110

Coronel Gregorio Albarracín Lanchipa District is one of ten districts of the province Tacna in Peru.
