= Calana District =

- District
- Interactive map of Calana District
- Coordinates: 17.9389°S 70.1862°W
- Country: Peru
- Region: Tacna
- Province: Tacna
- Founded: August 20, 1872
- Capital: Calana

Government
  - Mayor: Juan Ramos Arocutipa

Area
  - Total: 108.38 km^{2} (41.85 sq mi)
- Elevation: 875 m (2,871 ft)

Population (2005 census)
  - Total: 2,394
  - Density: 22.09/km^{2} (57.21/sq mi)
- Time zone: UTC-5 (PET)
- UBIGEO: 230103

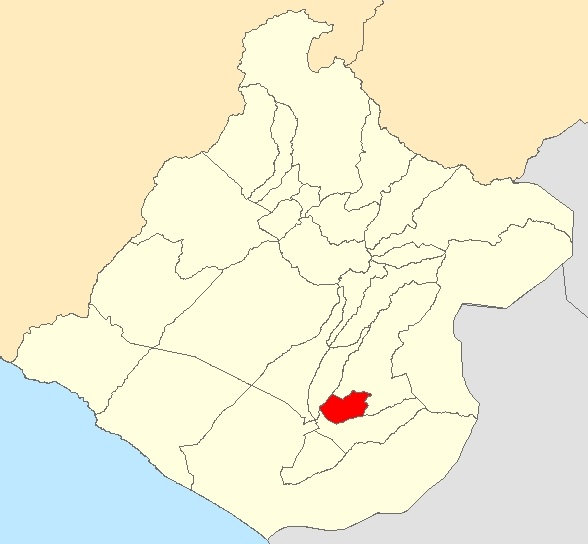
Map showing district Calana, Tacna, Peru.

Calana District is one of ten districts of Tacna Province in Peru.

== Climate ==
Climate data for Calana, elevation 785 m (2,575 ft), (1991–2020)
Month	Jan	Feb	Mar	Apr	May	Jun	Jul	Aug	Sep	Oct	Nov	Dec	Year
Mean daily maximum °C (°F)	26.4 (79.5)	27.1 (80.8)	26.4 (79.5)	24.4 (75.9)	22.3 (72.1)	20.5 (68.9)	19.9 (67.8)	20.4 (68.7)	21.5 (70.7)	22.8 (73.0)	24.0 (75.2)	25.3 (77.5)	23.4 (74.1)
Mean daily minimum °C (°F)	15.1 (59.2)	15.6 (60.1)	14.6 (58.3)	12.6 (54.7)	10.2 (50.4)	8.2 (46.8)	7.5 (45.5)	8.0 (46.4)	9.2 (48.6)	10.6 (51.1)	12.0 (53.6)	13.4 (56.1)	11.4 (52.6)
Average precipitation mm (inches)	4.1 (0.16)	2.5 (0.10)	0.9 (0.04)	0.4 (0.02)	1.6 (0.06)	1.9 (0.07)	2.9 (0.11)	2.9 (0.11)	2.6 (0.10)	1.1 (0.04)	1.1 (0.04)	1.3 (0.05)	23.3 (0.9)
Source: National Meteorology and Hydrology Service of Peru
