= Tacna Cathedral =

Roman Catholic church in Tacna, Peru

Coordinates: 18.0145°S 70.2519°W

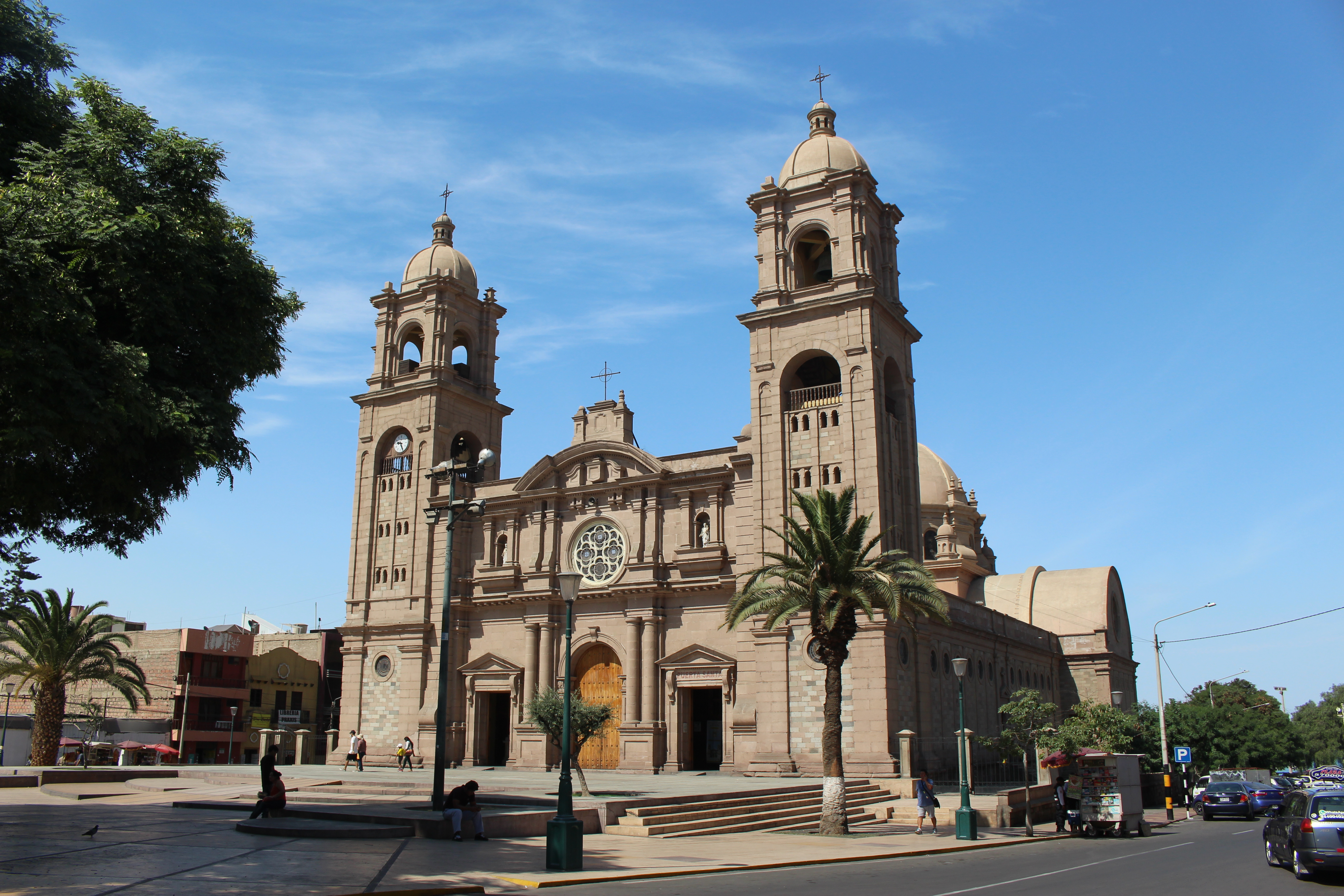
Tacna Cathedral

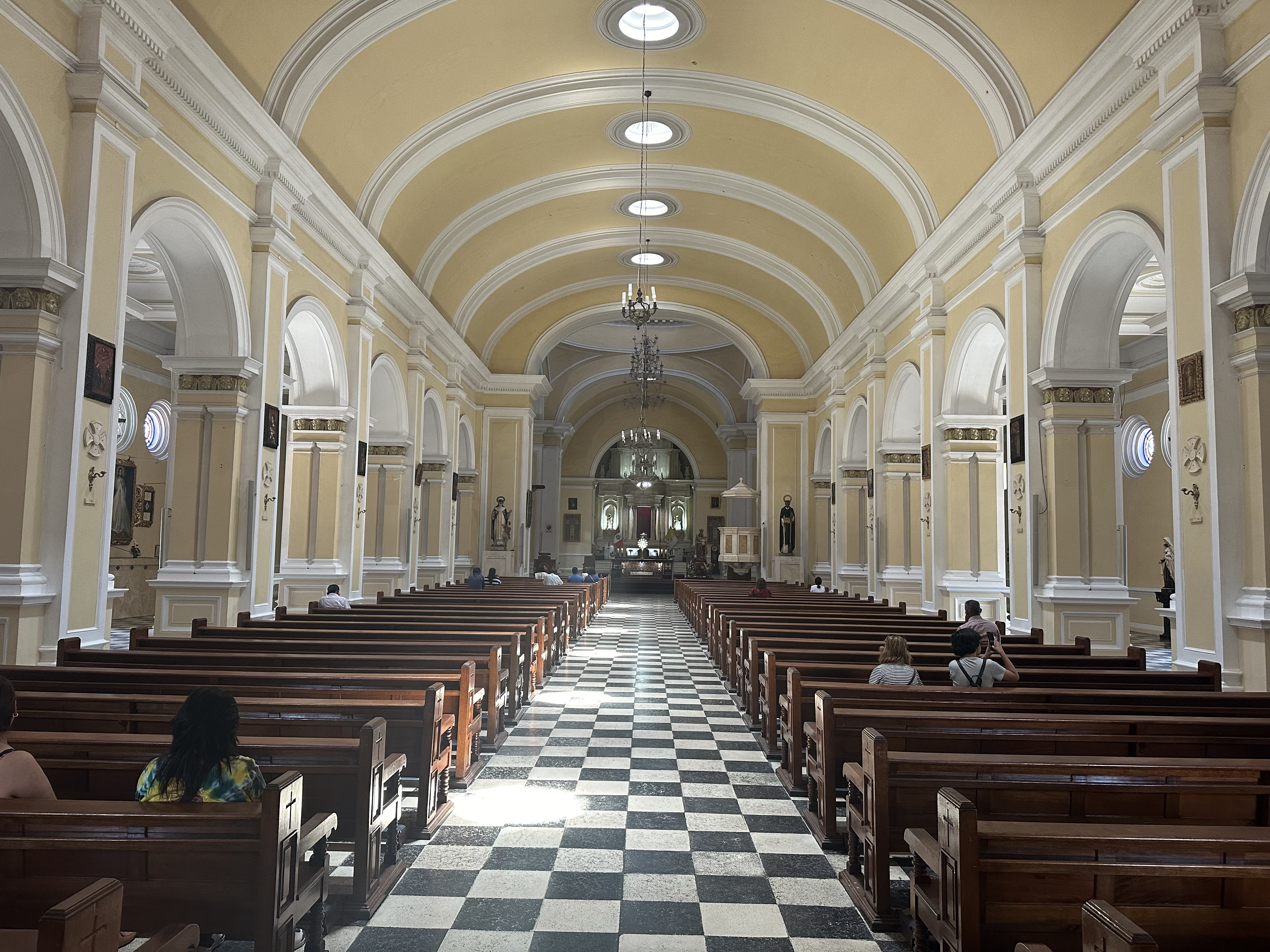
Inside of the Tacna Cathedral

Tacna Cathedral is a Roman Catholic church located next to the Paseo Cívico de Tacna at San Martín Avenue, in the center of the city of Tacna, Peru.

== History ==
Its construction began in 1875 by the French firm of Alejandro Gustave Eiffel. Because of the War of the Pacific (1879) and the Chilean occupation, the work stopped. The church was formally completed in 1954.

== Architecture ==
It is built in the neo-renaissance architectural style. It is created with stones quarried from the hills of Intiorko and Arunta.

== See also ==
- San Ramón Church
