= Pachía District =

Pachía
- District
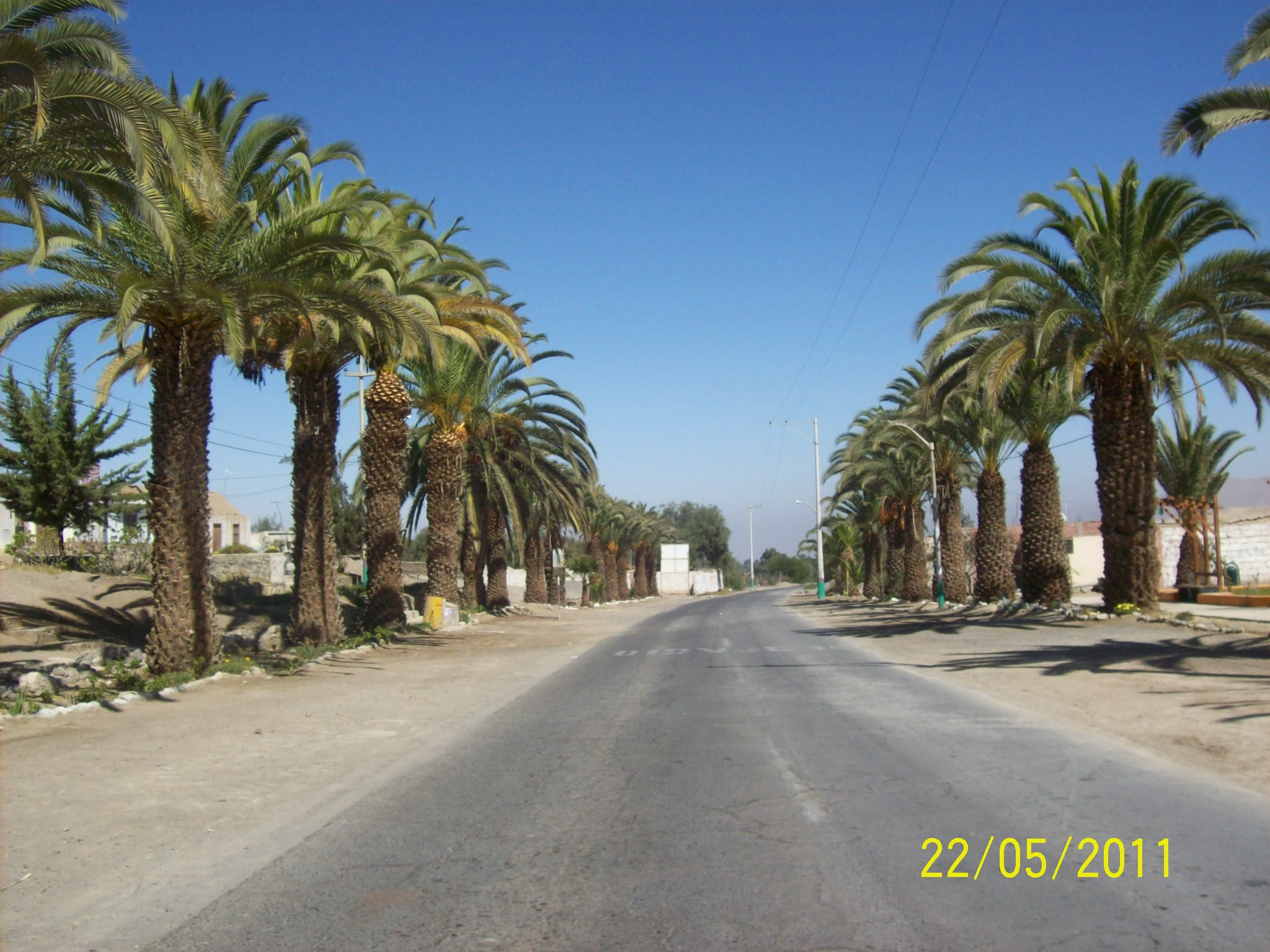

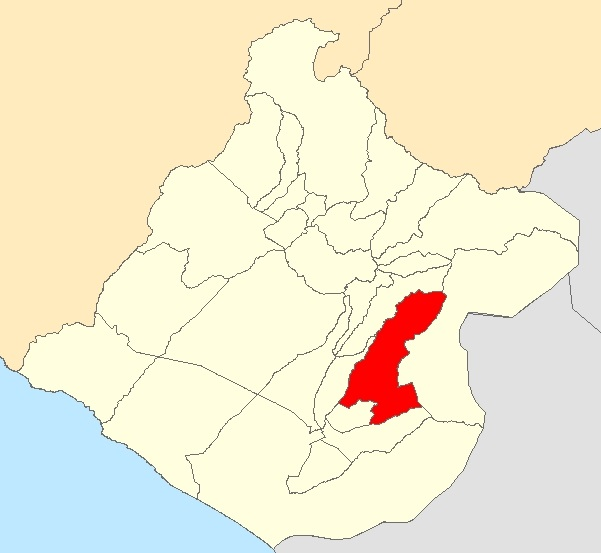
- Location of Pachía in the Tacna Province
- Coordinates: 17.8969°S 70.1547°W
- Country: Peru
- Region: Tacna
- Province: Tacna
- Founded: January 2, 1857
- Capital: Pachía

Government
  - Mayor: Victor Felix Cutipa Melchor

Area
  - Total: 603.68 km^{2} (233.08 sq mi)
- Elevation: 1,090 m (3,580 ft)

Population (2005 census)
  - Total: 1,747
  - Density: 2.894/km^{2} (7.495/sq mi)
- Time zone: UTC-5 (PET)
- UBIGEO: 230106
- Website: munipachia.gob.pe

Pachía District is one of ten districts of the province Tacna in Peru.

== Climate ==
Climate data for Calientes, Pachía, elevation 1,200 m (3,900 ft), (1991–2020)
Month	Jan	Feb	Mar	Apr	May	Jun	Jul	Aug	Sep	Oct	Nov	Dec	Year
Mean daily maximum °C (°F)	24.7 (76.5)	25.2 (77.4)	24.9 (76.8)	23.4 (74.1)	22.6 (72.7)	22.1 (71.8)	21.9 (71.4)	22.0 (71.6)	21.9 (71.4)	22.5 (72.5)	23.3 (73.9)	24.0 (75.2)	23.2 (73.8)
Mean daily minimum °C (°F)	13.3 (55.9)	14.4 (57.9)	13.6 (56.5)	11.8 (53.2)	9.6 (49.3)	8.2 (46.8)	8.4 (47.1)	8.3 (46.9)	8.6 (47.5)	10.0 (50.0)	10.4 (50.7)	11.9 (53.4)	10.7 (51.3)
Average precipitation mm (inches)	8.0 (0.31)	5.2 (0.20)	1.2 (0.05)	0.2 (0.01)	0.1 (0.00)	0.1 (0.00)	0.7 (0.03)	0.2 (0.01)	0.4 (0.02)	0.2 (0.01)	0.4 (0.02)	2.2 (0.09)	18.9 (0.75)
Source: National Meteorology and Hydrology Service of Peru

== See also ==
- Qutañani
