= Pedro José Rada y Gamio =

Peruvian politician (1873–1938)

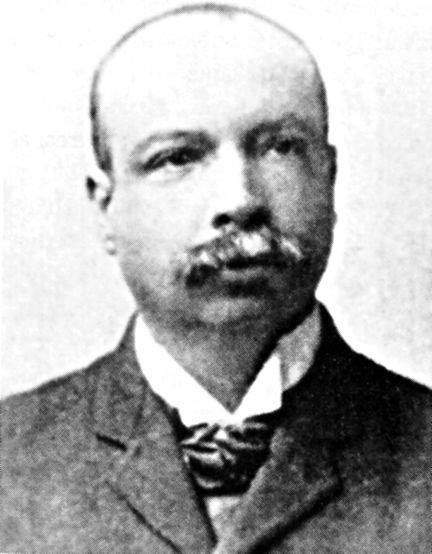
Pedro Rada

Pedro José Rada y Gamio (15 August 1873 – 25 May 1938) was a Peruvian politician in the early 20th century. He served as the President of the Chamber of Deputies from 1921 to 1922. He was the mayor of Lima from 1922 to 1925 and the prime minister of Peru from 7 December 1926 to 12 October 1929.

In 1924, while Minister of Development during the reign of Augusto B. Leguía, Rada y Gamio inaugurated a statue dedicated to the dictator and proclaimed that "Current times need constructive statesmen that can preserve the Fatherland and the social order, such as Mussolini in Italy, Lloyd George in England, Leguía in Peru". In 1926, Rada y Gamio delivered a rationale for his government's oppression of the American Popular Revolutionary Alliance and the Peruvian Socialist Party by describing "red books" as promoting "dishonest, stupid ideas and malignant actions", and likewise leftist opponents of the Leguía dictatorship in general as "soulless men", "vulgar assassins", "worthless and useless", among other descriptions.

He remained a deputy in Congress that succeeded the Constituent Assembly until 1924. In 1925, he was elected Senator for Arequipa and held that seat until 1930, when president Leguía’s downfall occurred.

Enjoying Leguía's friendship and trust, he became one of the leading figures of his regime. He served successively as Minister of Development and Public Works.

== Biography ==
Pedro was the son of José A. Hipólito Rada y Paz Soldán and Juana de Gamio y Ugarte. He was related to the Arequipa general Juan Mariano de Goyeneche y Gamio, count of Guaqui and duke of Gamio. He completed his school studies at the Docarmo private school. He was fifteen years old when he entered the National University of San Agustín in Arequipa, where he graduated with a bachelor's degree in Philosophy and Letters (1890);high school (1893) and doctorate of jurisprudence (1896), and received his law degree (1894). He also graduated with a doctorate in Political and Administrative Sciences from the National University of San Marcos (1898).

Political offices
Preceded by Pedro Mujica	Mayor of Lima; 1922–1925	Succeeded by Andrés F. Dasso
Preceded by Alejandrino Maguiña	Prime Minister of Peru; 1926–1929	Succeeded by Benjamín Huamán de los Heros
