= Roman Catholic Diocese of Tacna and Moquegua =

Catholic diocese in Peru

Diocese of Tacna and Moquegua Dioecesis Tacnensis et Moqueguensis Tacna y Moquegua

Catholic
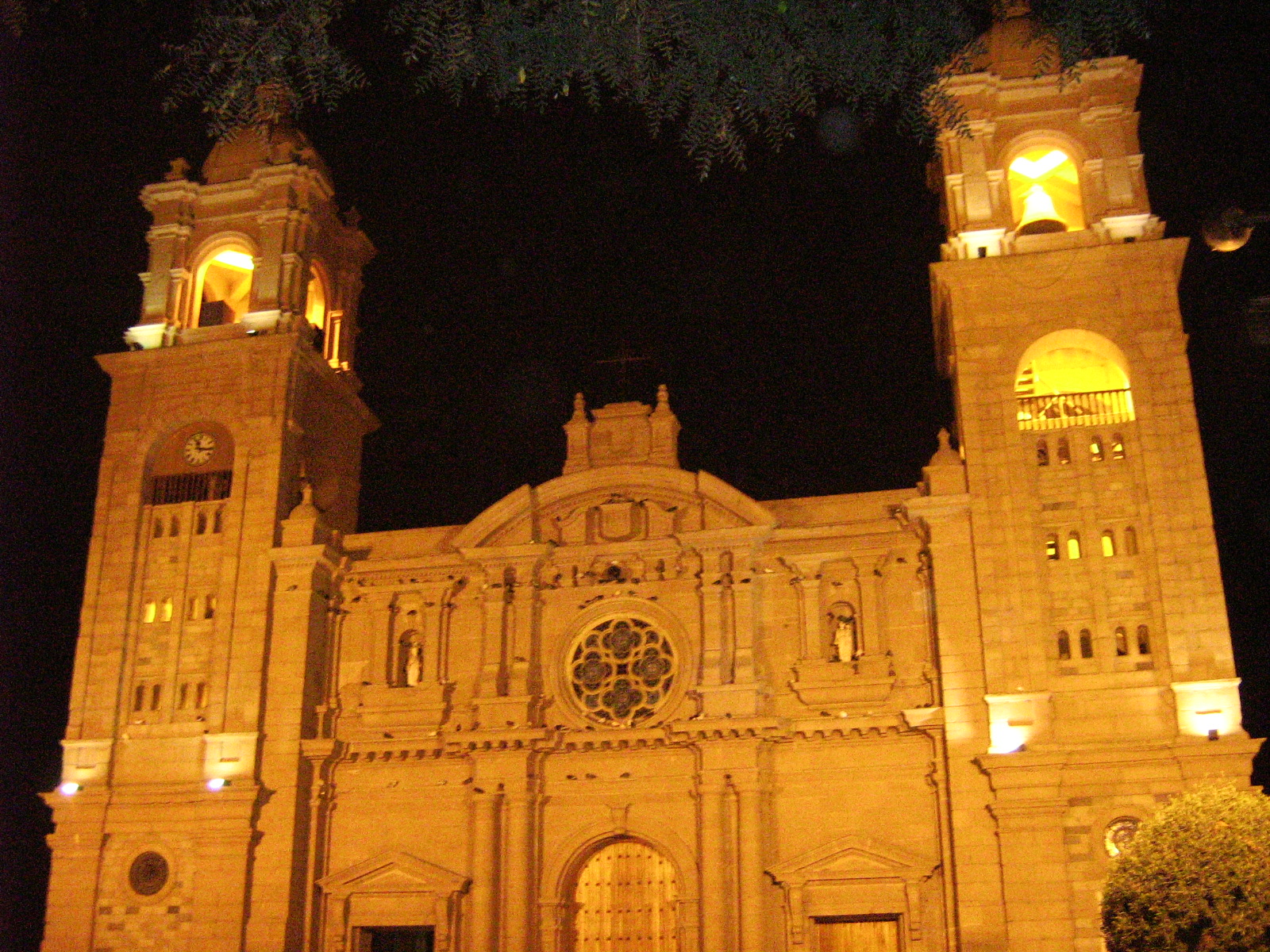
- Cathedral of Our Lady of the Rosary

Location
- Country: Peru
- Ecclesiastical province: Arequipa

Statistics
- Area: 30,539 km^{2} (11,791 sq mi)
- Population: Total; Catholics: (as of 2010); 625,000; 556,000 (89%)
- Parishes: 38

Information
- Denomination: Catholic
- Sui iuris church: Latin Church
- Rite: Roman Rite
- Established: 18 December 1944 (81 years ago)
- Cathedral: Catedral Nuestra Señora del Rosario
- Co-cathedral: Co-Catedral Santa Catalina

Current leadership
- Pope: Leo XIV
- Bishop: Marco Antonio Cortez Lara

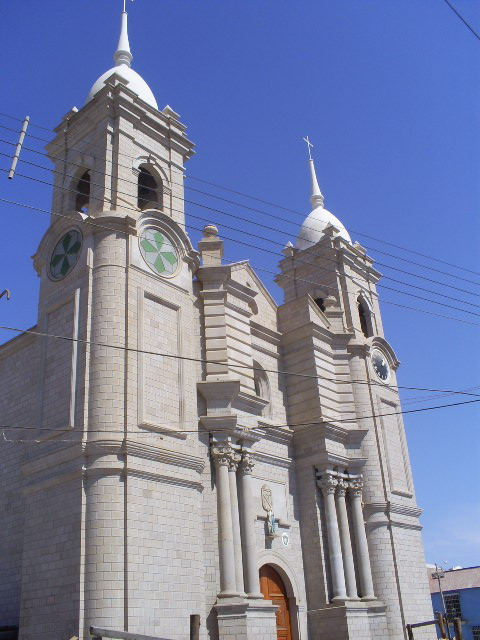
Co-Cathedral of St. Catherine

The Diocese of Tacna and Moquegua (Latin: Dioecesis Tacnensis et Moqueguensis) is a suffragan diocese of the Metropolitan Archdiocese of Arequipa in southern Peru, comprising the lay administrative regions Tacna Region and Moquegua region.

== History ==
On 18 December 1944 Pope Pius XII established the Diocese of Tacna from the territory of the Archdiocese of Arequipa. John Paul II renamed it the Diocese of Tacna and Moquegua on 11 July 1992.

== Bishops ==
=== Ordinaries ===
- Carlos Alberto Arce Masías † (6 Jul 1945 – 17 Dec 1956) Appointed, Bishop of Huánuco
- Alfonso Zaplana Bellizza † (17 Dec 1957 – 28 Apr 1973)
- Oscar Rolando Cantuarias Pastor † (5 Oct 1973 – 9 Sep 1981) Appointed, Archbishop of Piura
- Oscar Julio Alzamora Revoredo, S. M. † (16 Dec 1982 – 13 Feb 1991)
- José Hugo Garaycoa Hawkins † (6 Jun 1991 – 1 Sep 2006)
- Marco Antonio Cortez Lara (1 Sep 2006 – present)

=== Coadjutor bishops ===
- José Eduardo Velásquez Tarazona (2000-2004), did not succeed to see; appointed Bishop of Huaraz
- Marco Antonio Cortez Lara (2005-2006)

=== Other priest of this diocese who became a bishop ===
- José Germán Benavides Morriberón †, appointed Bishop of Chachapoyas in 1958
