= List of museums in Peru =

This is a list of museums in Peru.

== In Arequipa region ==
- Andean Sanctuaries Museum

== In Cusco region ==
- Museo de Arte Precolombino, Cusco
- Museum of Sacred, Magical and Medicinal PlantsThere is a great deal to be done
- Real Felipe Fortress - currently the Peruvian Army Museum)
- Regional Historical Museum of Cusco, house of Inca Garcilaso de la Vega

== In Lambayeque region ==
- Brüning Museum
- Royal Tombs of Sipán Museum
- Sicán National Museum

== In Ica Region ==
- Regional Museum of Ica "Adolfo Bermúdez Jenkins"

== In Lima region ==
- Gold Museum of Peru and Arms of the World
- Lima Art Museum
- Larco Museum
- Museo de la Nación
- Museo Mario Testino
- National Afro-Peruvian Museum
- National Museum of Archaeology, Anthropology and History of Peru
- National Museum of Peru
- Museum of Archaeology and Anthropology, University of San Marcos
- Museum of Art, University of San Marcos
- Museum of the Brain
- Museum of Contemporary Art, Lima
- Museum of Elections and Democracy
- Museum of Italian Art

== In San Martin region ==
- Regional Museum of the National University of San Martin

== In Tacna region ==
- Alto de la Alianza Museum - in the Alto de la Alianza Monumental Complex
- Tacna Courthouse - (contains the Reincorporation Museum, the Tacna Art Gallery, and the Historic Departmental Archives.)
- National Railway Museum (Peru)
- Salon Museo Arqueologico - archeological museum

== See also ==
- List of museums by country
