= Alto de la Alianza Museum =

Museum in Tacna, Peru

Coordinates: 18.0003°S 70.2939°W

- Museo de Sitio del Campo de la Alianza
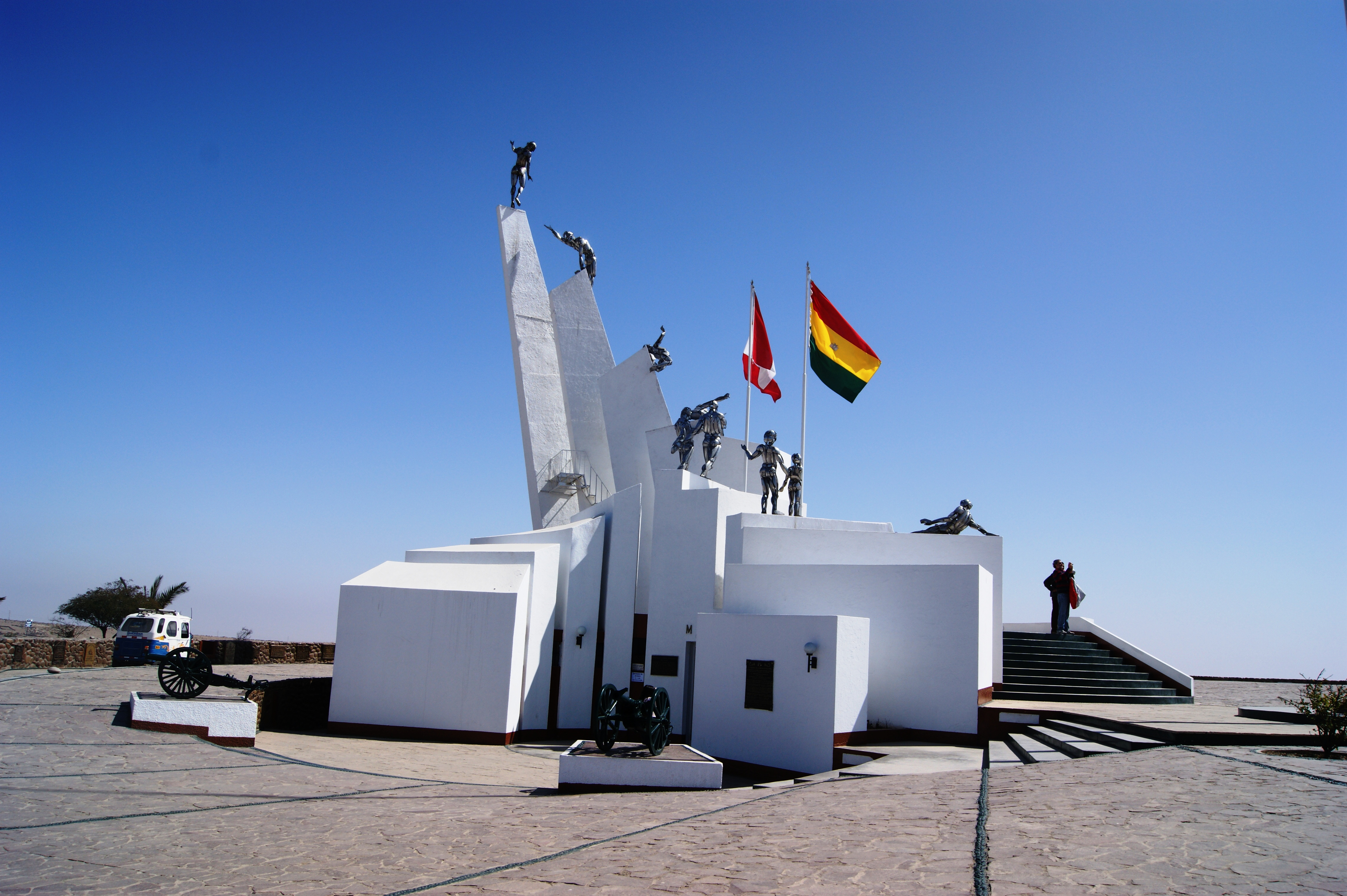
- The museum's entrance
- Established: 26 May 1982
- Location: Alto de la Alianza, Tacna, Peru
- Type: Historic site
- Accreditation: Patronage of the Campo de la Alianza

The Alto de la Alianza Museum (Spanish: Museo de Sitio del Campo de la Alianza) is a war museum located at the Alto de la Alianza Monumental Complex, near Tacna, in southern Peru. It was inaugurated on May 26, 1982.

It is located on Intiorko Hill, at the base of the monument erected in honor of the combatants of the Battle of Alto de la Alianza in 1880, forming part of the Alto de la Alianza Monumental Complex. The museum is circular in shape, and cannons flank it at its entrance. Inside objects from the time of the War of the Pacific are stored, such as military uniforms, rifles, sabers, dress uniforms, letters, documents, a scale model of the battle, bones, cartridges, ammunition, etc.

== See also ==
- Alto de la Alianza Monumental Complex
- List of museums in Peru
