= Gold Museum =

Gold Museum may refer to:

- Gold Museum, Bogotá, Colombia
- Gold Museum (Taiwan), Taipei, Taiwan
- Gold Museum of Peru and Weapons of the World, Lima, Peru
- Toi Gold Museum, Izu, Japan
- Pre-Columbian Gold Museum, San Jose, Costa Rica
- PG Gold Museum, Penang, Malaysia
