= De Zela =

de Zela is a surname. Notable people with the surname include:

- Francisco Antonio de Zela, anti-Spanish Empire revolutionary
- Hugo de Zela (born 1951), Peruvian diplomat and professor
