= Cripta de los Héroes (Tacna) =

Monument in Peru

Crypt of Heroes
- Cripta de los Héroes
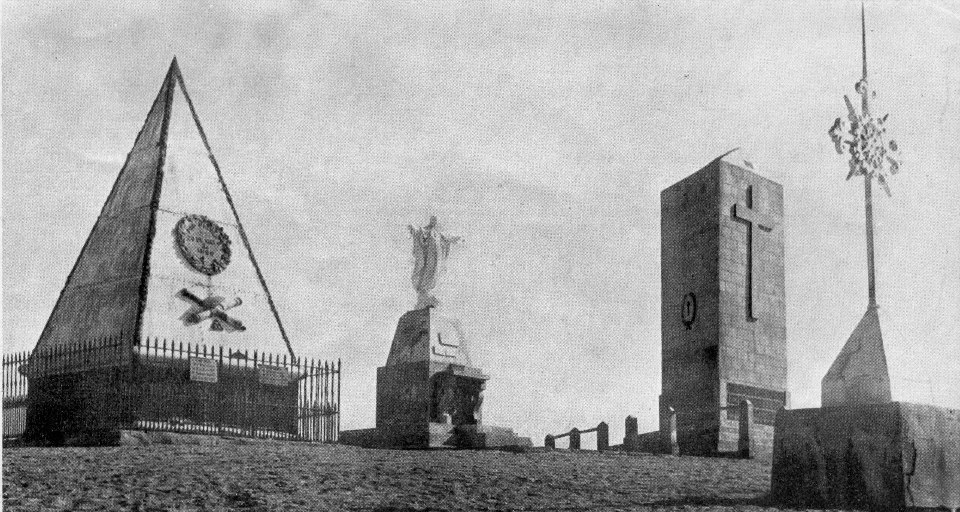
- The monument in 1930
- Interactive map of Crypt of Heroes
- Location: Intiorko Hill, Tacna, Peru
- Coordinates: 17°59′30″S 70°15′36″W
- Dedicated date: September 19, 1901
- Dedicated to: Those killed in action during the Battle of Tacna

The Crypt of Heroes (Spanish: Cripta de los Héroes) is a war monument located at Intiorko Hill, Tacna, Peru. Originally inaugurated by the Chilean administration in 1901 and rededicated in 1930 by the Peruvian government, the monument is currently partially destroyed.

== History ==
It was inaugurated on September 19 (Day of the Glories of the Chilean Army), 1901, by the Chilean administration, having only the metal pyramid known as the pyramidal ossuary (with the date May 28 instead of May 26) in collaboration with the Pro Patria committee. The Peruvian priests of Tacna, who would later be expelled, did not want to solemnize the inauguration ceremony, which was solemnized by Presbyter Juan José Julio Elizalde, nicknamed "Pope Julio."

After the handover of Tacna to Peru in 1929, a statue of Christ the Redeemer was placed next to a cross. Until 1979, the people of Tacna paid tribute to the fallen in the place, however, after the construction of the Alto de la Alianza Monumental Complex, the place is forgotten and deteriorates over time in addition to suffering vandalism.

Héctor Jiménez J., a local resident of Tacna, heads the efforts to restore the historical monument and accuses the regional government of abandoning it.

== See also ==
- Tacna Prefecture
- Alto de la Alianza
- San Ramón Church
