= Tacna Prefecture =

- Prefectura de Tacna; Intendencia de Tacna
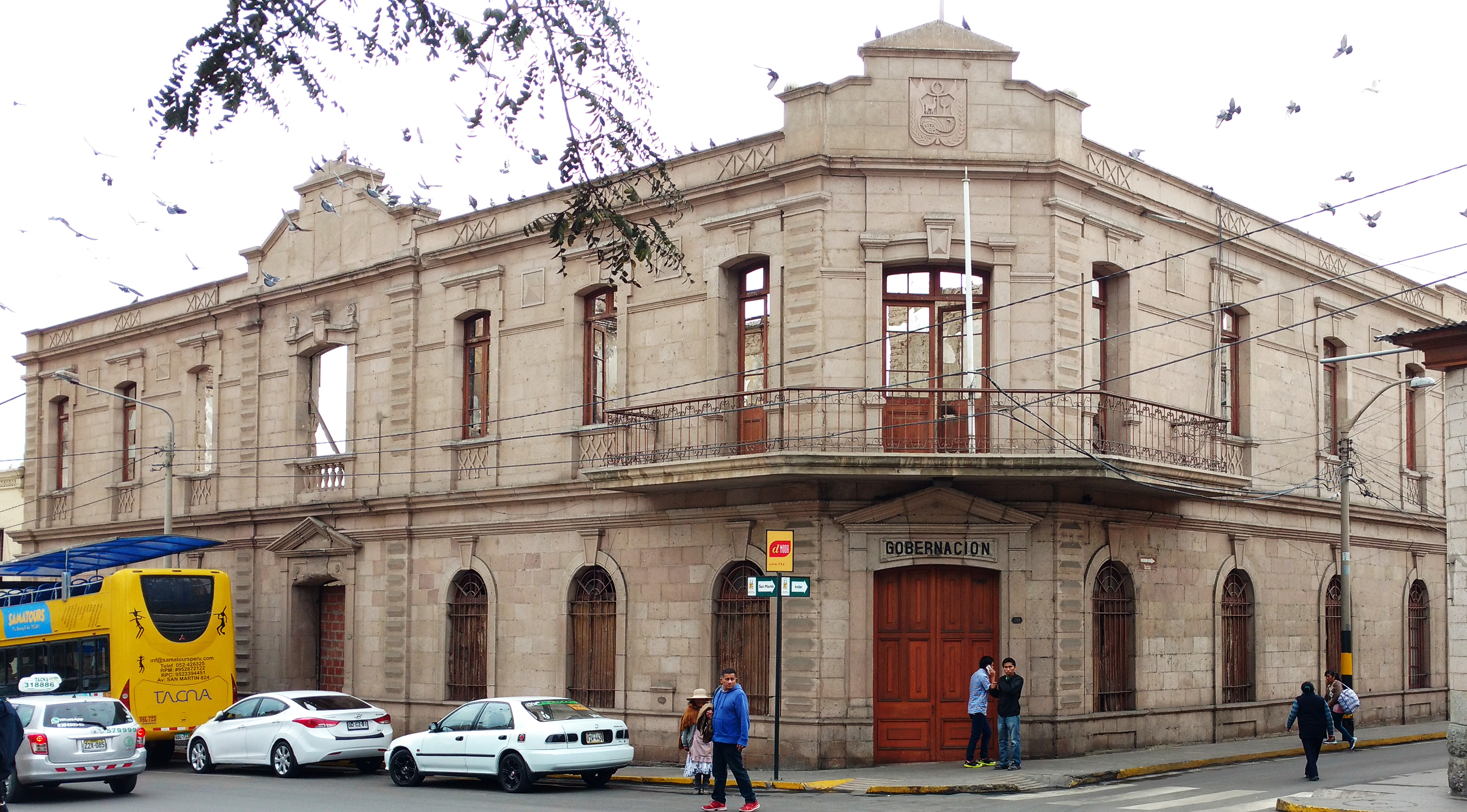
- The building in 2018
- Interactive map of the Tacna Prefecture area
- Alternative names: Tacna Intendancy

General information
- Status: Destroyed
- Location: Tacna, Peru
- Construction started: 1905
- Completed: 1909
- Destroyed: 30 October 2008
- Owner: Government of Peru (since 1929); Government of Chile (1905–1929)

Technical details
- Floor count: 2

The Tacna Prefecture, also known as the Tacna Intendancy, is a building located at Blondell street, in the homonymous city in Peru. It was built and used by Chile under its administration of its former Tacna Province until its return to Peru in 1929. The building was declared a historic site in 1980, however was torched by accident in 2008 by demonstrators, and its outer facade is the only part that's still standing.

== History ==
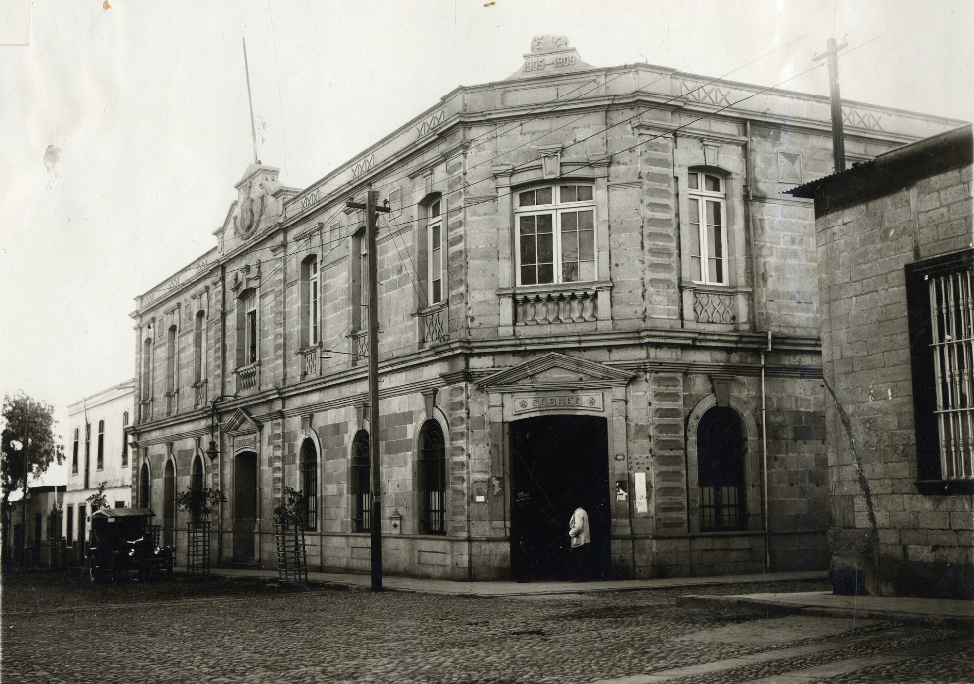
The building under Chilean administration.

The building was built between 1905 and 1909, as originally indicated on the top of the building. It was built based on quarry stone extracted from the Arunta and Intiorko hills. During the Chilean administration, the Coat of arms of Chile was carved in the sector located on Blondell Street.

The prefecture was known as the Intendancy (since it was where the office of the intendants of Tacna was located) and was also a prison, the Court of Appeals, the Court of First Instance, the main administration of the Post Office, among other faculties associated with the political authority of Chile in the region.

When Tacna rejoined Peru in 1929, the building continued to be used for administrative purposes by the new Peruvian administration. The building's façade, was changed, with changes including the removal of the Chilean shield and the inscription that showed the date of the construction of the enclosure. In that place of the building the Coat of arms of Peru was built with the same material, in addition, the text "Correo" was replaced by "Gobernación".

The building of the Prefecture of Tacna was declared a historical monument of Peru on August 24, 1980, during the government of Fernando Belaúnde Terry.

=== Fire ===
On October 30, 2008, in the context of the protests against the Mining Canon Law, there were blockades and destruction of state premises and public entities in the city. Hundreds of demonstrators took over the facilities of the Government of Tacna, and the governor, Raúl Urbiola Hani, fled through the back of the building climbing walls to escape the mob.

The group of people who were protesting in front of the prefecture's premises set fire to a piece of furniture. The fire destroyed everything that was inside the second and first floors, leaving it in its current state of ruins and of which only the façade built with stonemasonry remains.

=== Reconstruction ===
To this day, the Peruvian Government has not rebuilt the property. The Ministry of Culture made three observations to the proposal of the Provincial Municipality of Tacna, indicating that the original internal infrastructure must be maintained despite the fact that it collapsed.

== Gallery ==
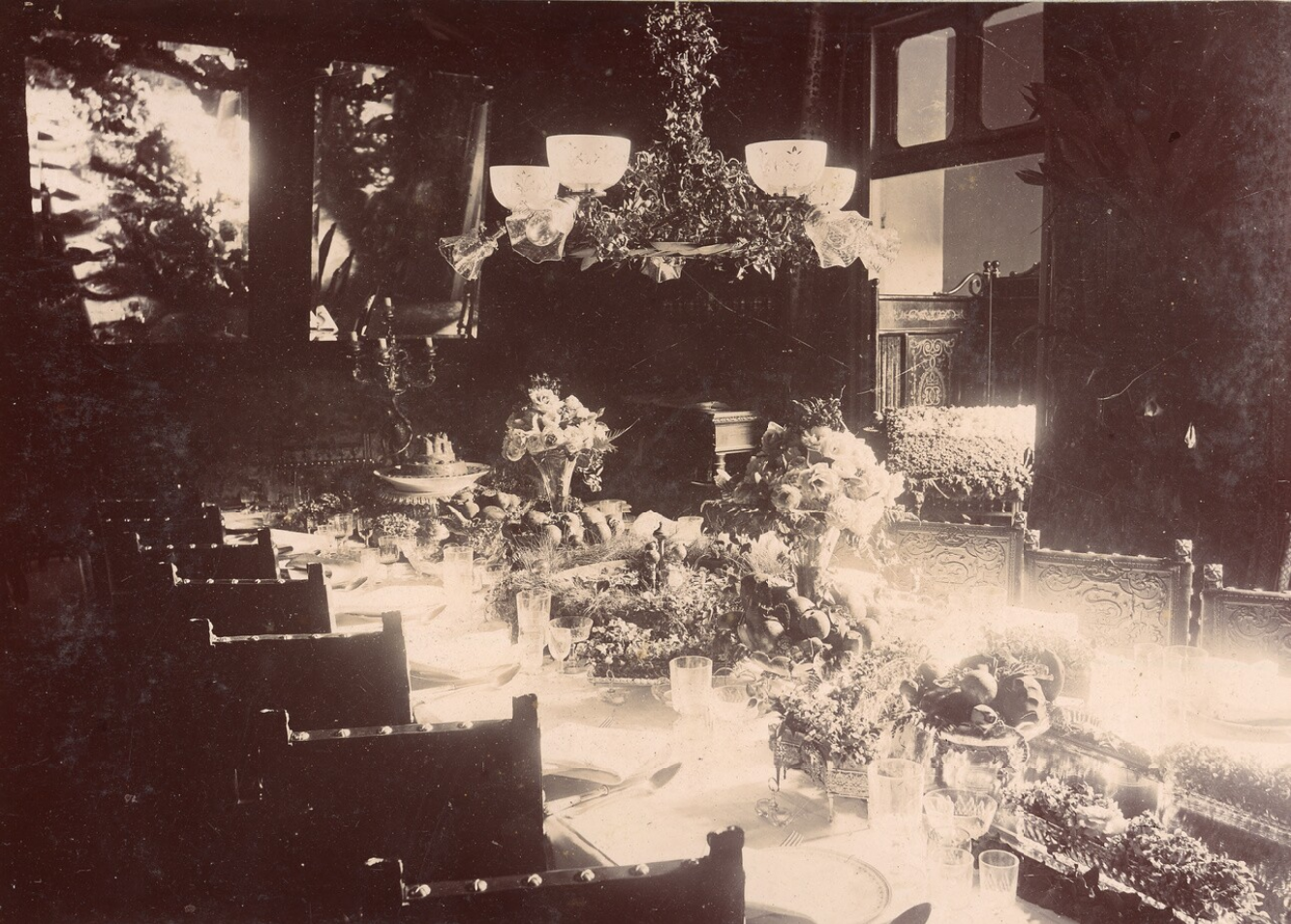
Dining hall in 1910

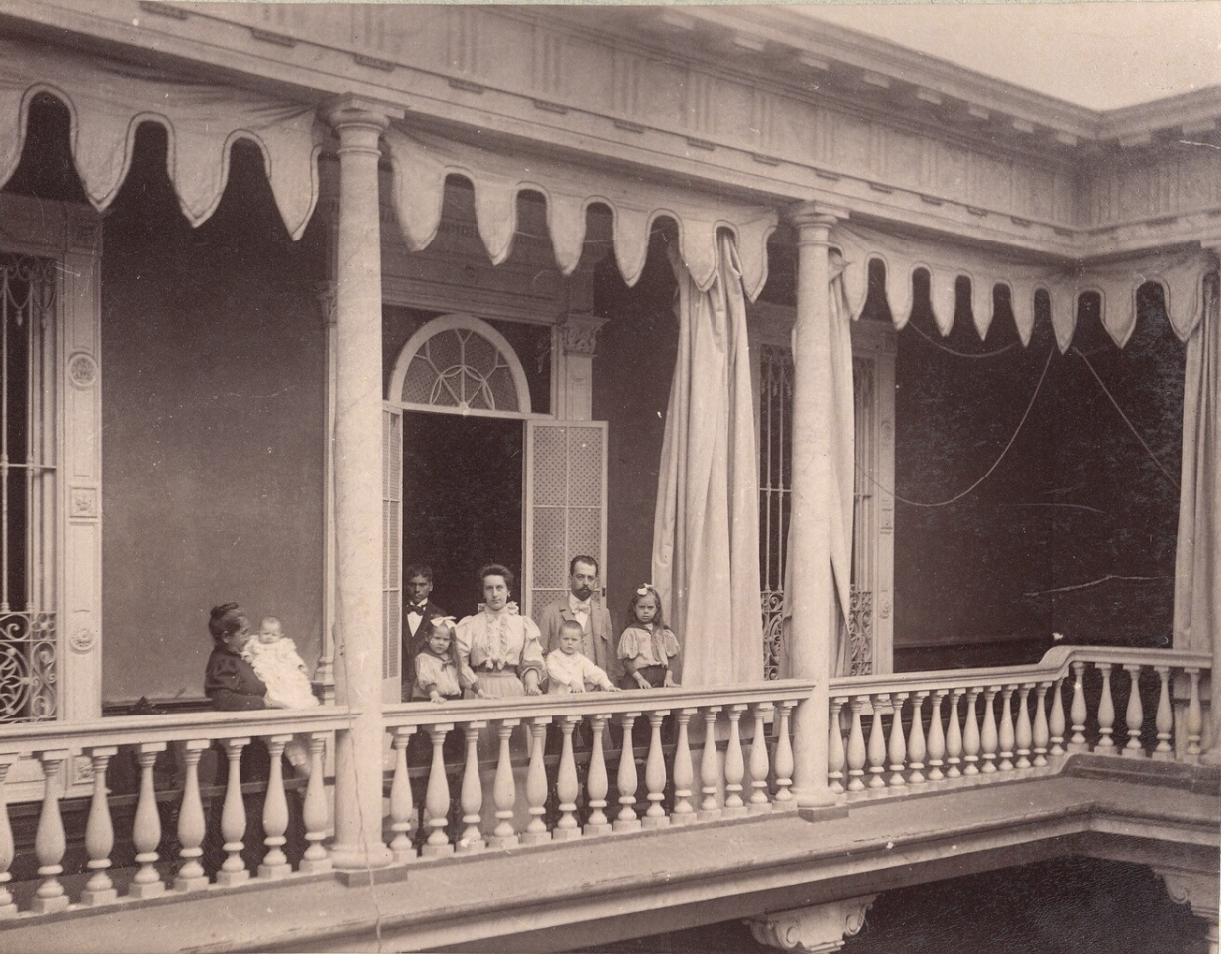
Unknown family in the building

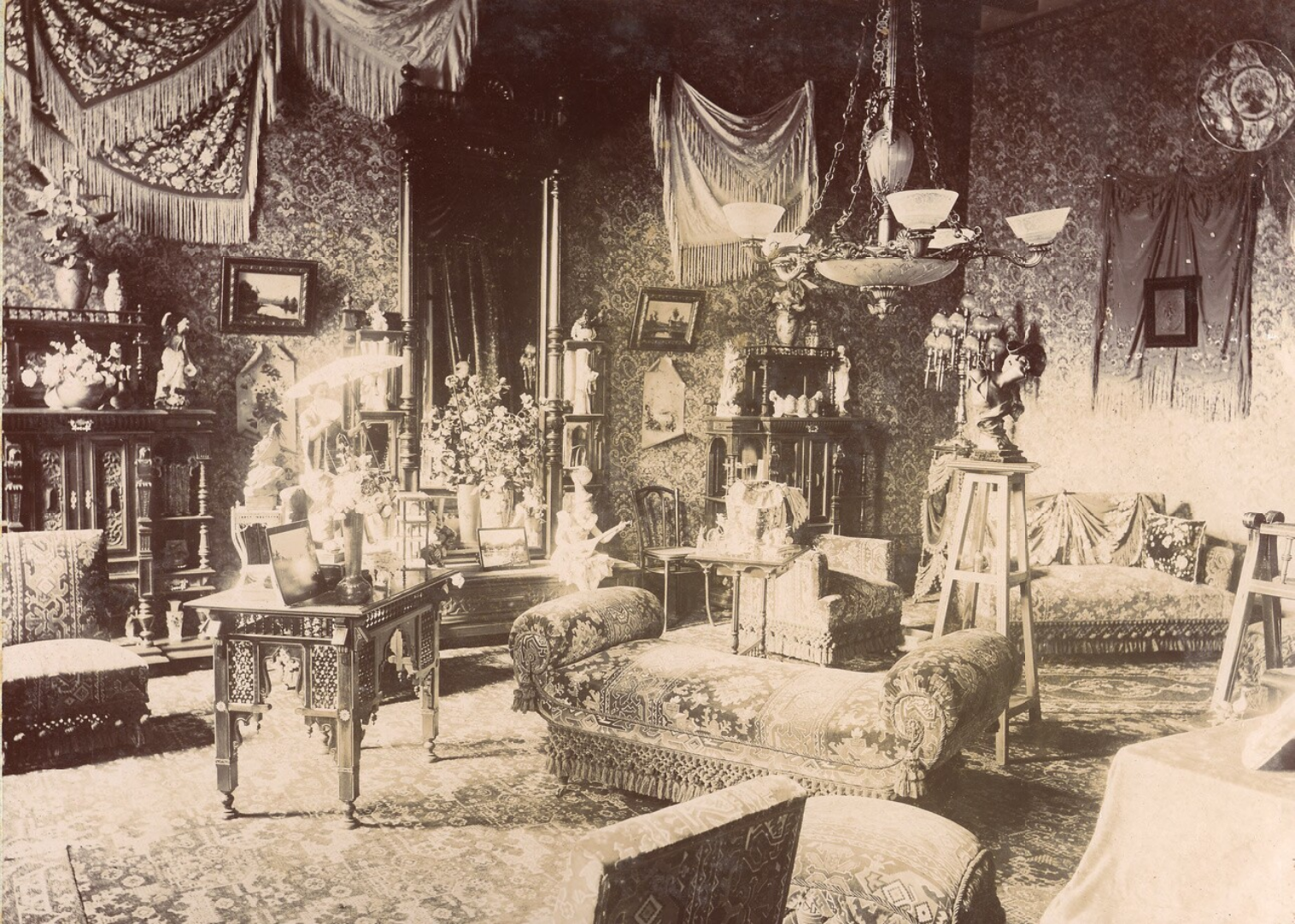
A room

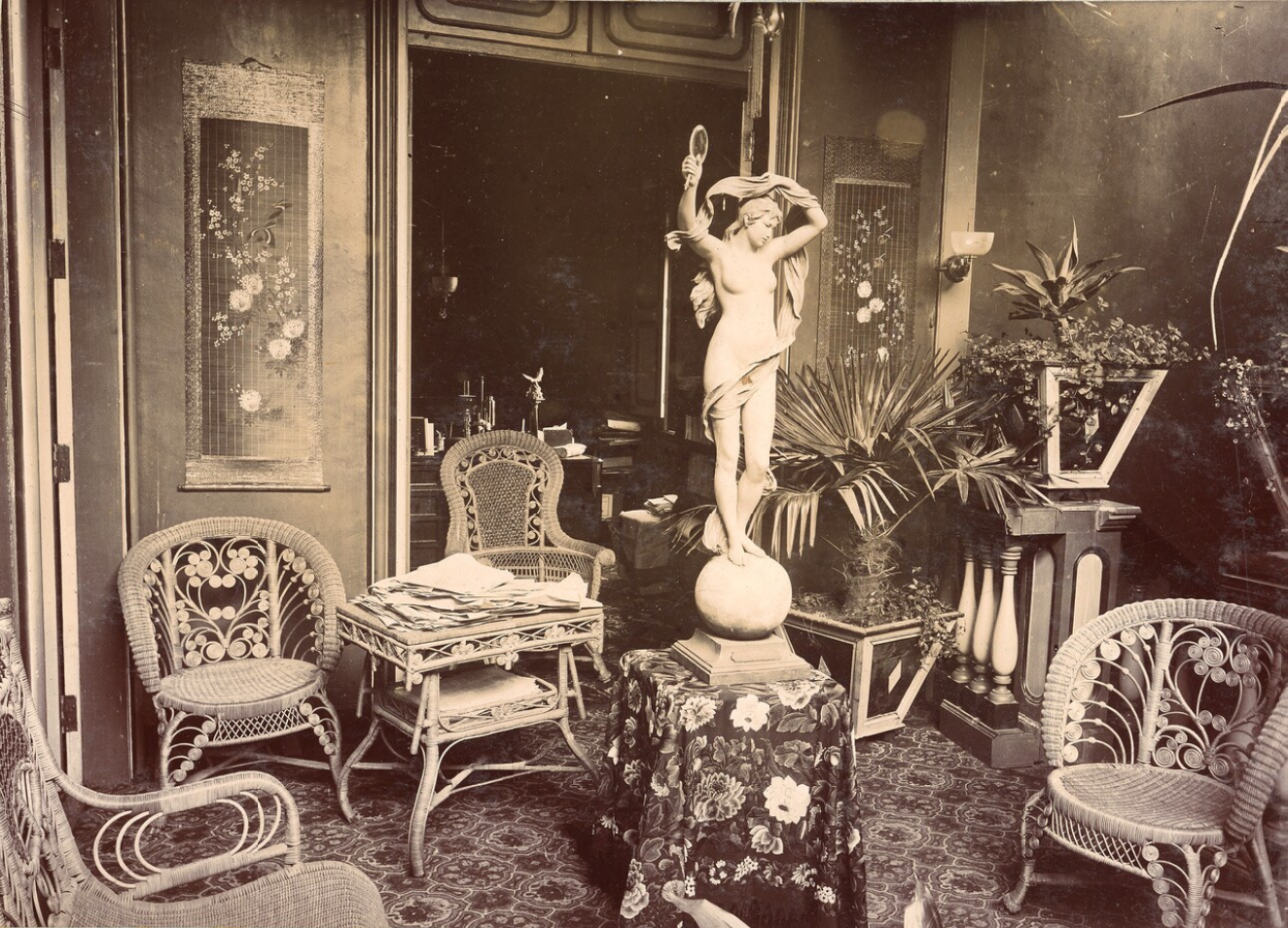
Another room

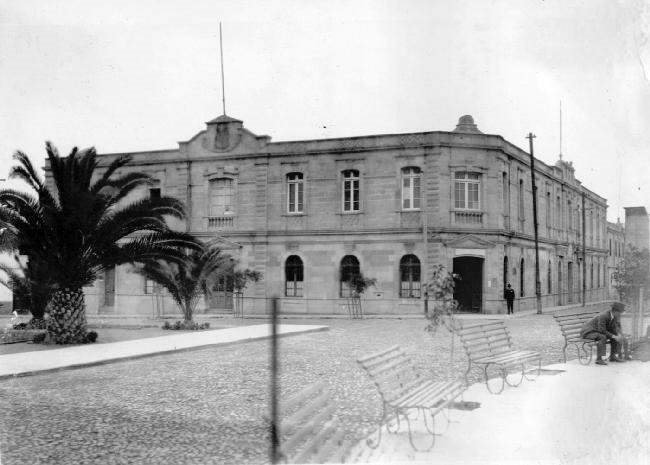
The building's exterior in 1910

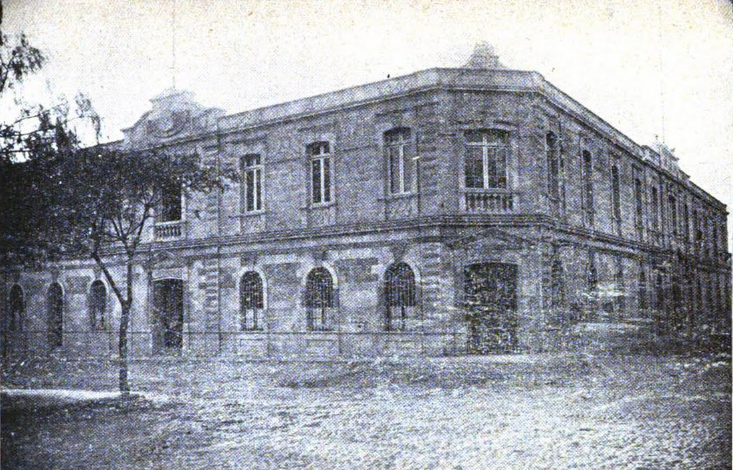
Ditto, 1913

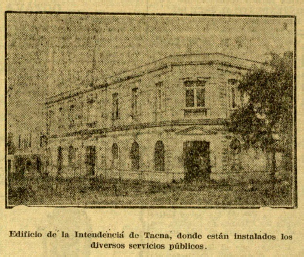
Ditto, 1922

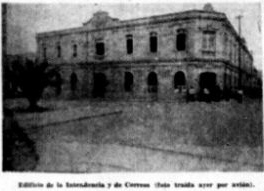
Ditto, hours before Tacna's return to Peru

== See also ==
- Cripta de los Héroes (Tacna)
- San Ramón Church
