= San Ramón Church =

Former church building in Peru

Coordinates: 18.0118°S 70.2529°W

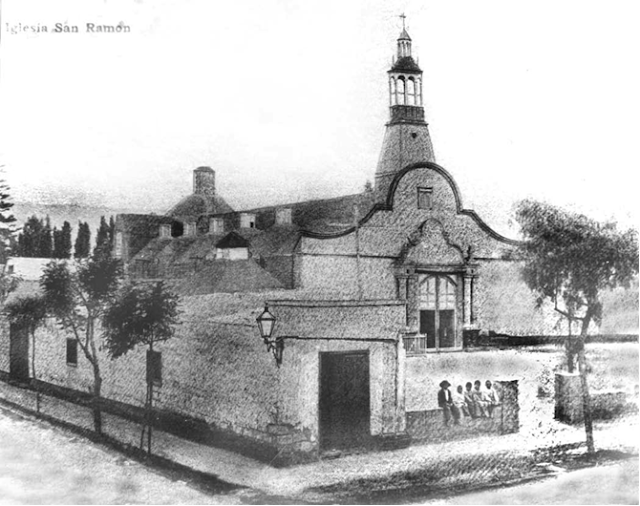
- The church, c. 1908
- San Ramón Church
- Address: Coronel Inclán & 2 de Mayo streets, Tacna
- Country: Chile (1880–c. 1910); Peru (1833–1880)
- Denomination: Catholic

History
- Status: Demolished
- Founded: 1833

Architecture
- Closed: November 24, 1909
- Demolished: c. 1910

Administration
- Archdiocese: Arequipa

San Ramón Church (Spanish: Iglesia San Ramón) was a 19th-century Catholic church located in Tacna which played an important role during the War of the Pacific and the subsequent Chilean administration of the city. The entire complex housed the church and a hospital of the same name built in 1848, which was also used as a psychiatric centre and a women's prison over time. The church was closed in 1909 by the Chilean mayor Máximo Lira, and was later destroyed. Currently the land belongs to the Charity of Tacna and was declared Cultural Heritage of the Nation in 2005, with its reconstruction announced but not yet started.

== History ==
The church was called that because the first mass, attended by Marshal Ramón Castilla (as president), was there, and it was also the place where he consecrated the Virgin of the Rosary as Marshal of Peru.

=== War of the Pacific ===
During the War of the Pacific, the temple was one of the places where the Peruvian troops hid the flag of the "2nd Line" Regiment of the Chilean Army's Infantry, captured during the battle of Tarapacá by Mariano Santos Mateo. This was recovered in 1880 by Chile.

The same year, after the battle of Tacna, the remains of the Peruvian soldiers were laid to rest in the temple.

=== Flag procession ===
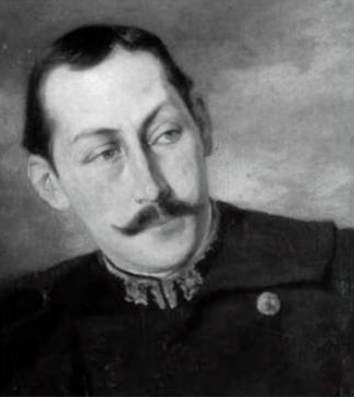
General Salvador Vergara Álvarez, who allowed the procession to take place.

During the administration of Tacna by Chile, in 1901, during the National Holidays of Peru on July 28, a procession of the Peruvian flag with a gold border left from the temple, being the first procession of the city's flag. With this restriction, the "Sociedad de Auxilios Mutuos El Porvenir" of Tacna asks the mayor of Tacna, Salvador Vergara Álvarez, to give it permission to hold a blessing ceremony for the institution's new flag.

The demonstration was authorized (after having originally rejected it due to the existing prohibition of displaying Peruvian patriotic symbols) by the Chilean interim mayor of the province of Tacna, General Salvador Vergara Álvarez, with the condition that it had to be done in silence (something that was fulfilled by the Peruvians), "without any manifestation of a patriotic nature" so as not to provoke clashes between Chileans and Peruvians caused by cheers in favor of Peru.

With permission, on July 28, 1901, it was carried out. Upon arrival, the flag was carried through uncrowded streets of the city to later be blessed in the church by the parish priest Alejandro Manrique, who blessed the flag by reciting the prayer "The Cross and the Flag" (Spanish: La Cruz y la Bandera). After the mass, the members of the society transport the flag in a procession from the temple, continuing along Unanue Street, to their location in Alto Lima. The Peruvian population of Tacna and Arica accompanied it in silence through the streets of Tacna. Finally, at the society's premises, the poet Federico Barreto recited a poem to the flag. From that date on, this would be the only public celebration of the Peruvian national holidays in the provinces of Tacna and Arica. After being taken through the central streets of the city, it arrived at the premises of the Benemérita Sociedad de Artesanos y Auxilios Mutuos El Porvenir.

=== Closure and destruction ===
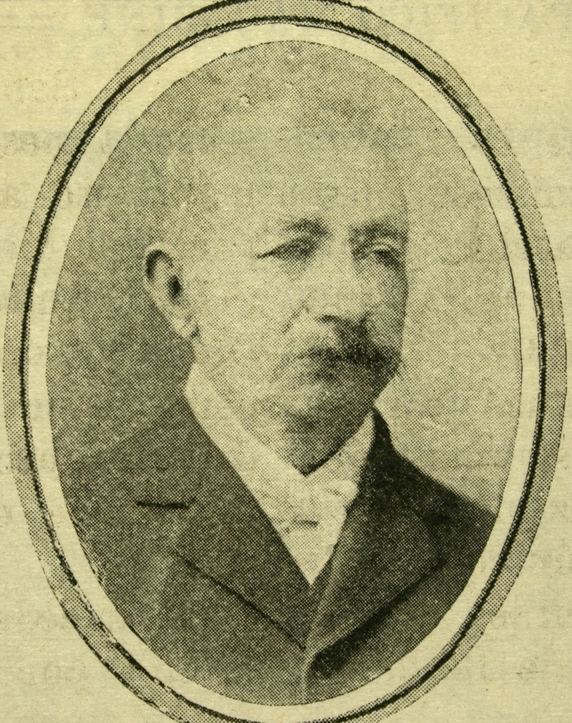
Intendant Máximo Lira

On November 24, 1909, the church was closed by Mayor Máximo Lira due to the activities of the church's priests who promoted pro-Peruvian sentiment. The guards continued blocking the entrance uninterruptedly, changing sentinels every 12 hours for approximately one year. The priests also still depended on the archdiocese of Arequipa. On March 3, 1910, Mayor Lira decreed the expulsion of the Peruvian priests within 48 hours. On March 5, with permission from the authority, Mariano Indacochea Zeballos, the church's priest from Arequipa, celebrated the last Peruvian mass in the church at 6:30 a.m. The mayor's office extended the deadline to 48 more hours when the priests were finally expelled from the city and the temple was subsequently destroyed.

=== Recovery attempts and current status ===
In 2014, the Decentralized Directorate of Culture tried to recover and value the site before the Regional Government of Tacna.

The land is owned by the Charity of Tacna, it was vacated in 1994, and in 2013 it was returned to administration. The Charity, lacking a budget, asked the regional government to prepare a project to request funds from the Peruvian national government for the recovery of the land. This was proposed to the Ministry of Culture but due to the lack of studies it could not be carried out.

In 2017 the Directorate of Culture intervened since the site was converted into a parking lot by the Charity.

== Gallery ==
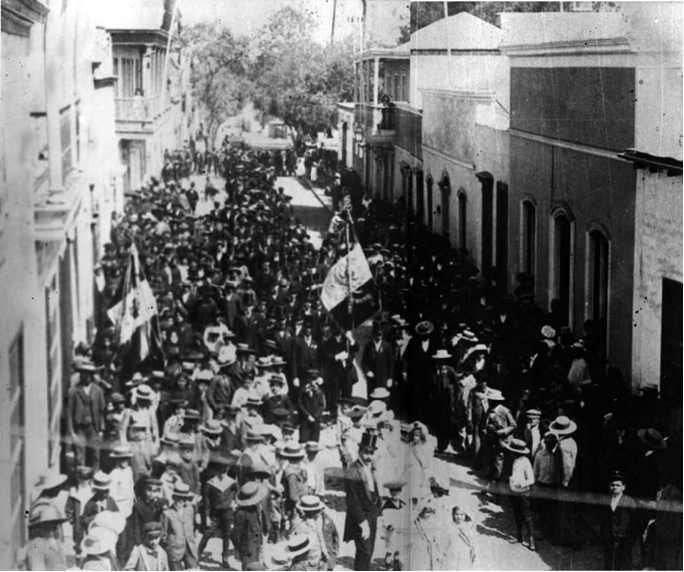
First flag parade in 1901

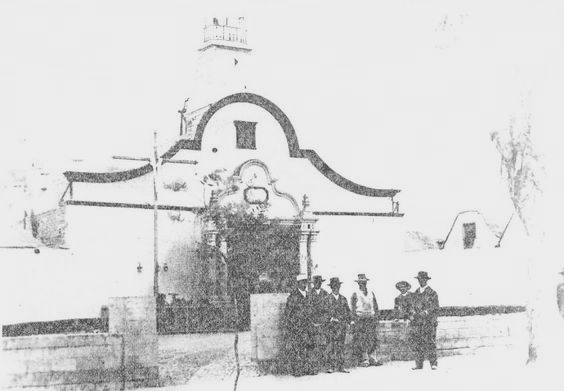
The church in 1908

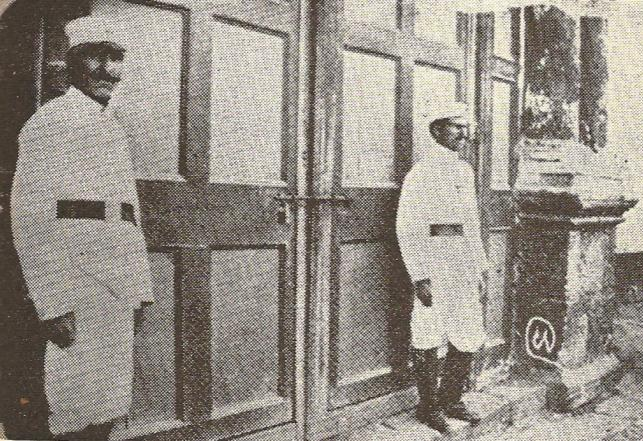
The church being blocked after its closure in 1909

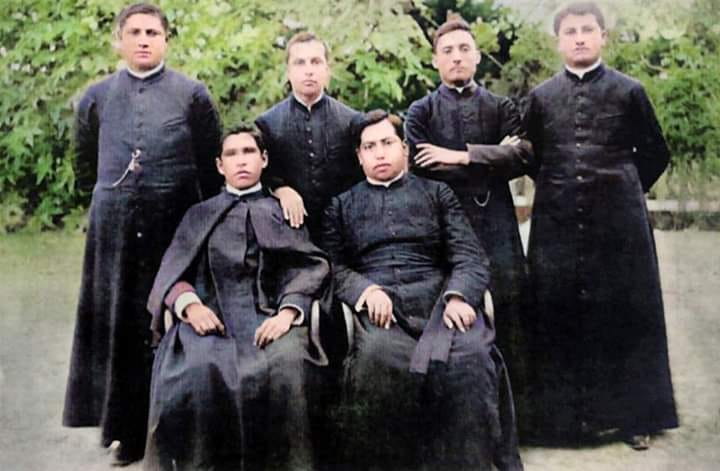
Peruvian priests expelled in 1910

== See also ==
- Procesión de la Bandera
- Tacna Prefecture
  - Intendant of Tacna
- Tacna Cathedral
- Cripta de los Héroes (Tacna)
