= Sicán National Museum =

Coordinates: 6°37′26″S 79°47′08″W

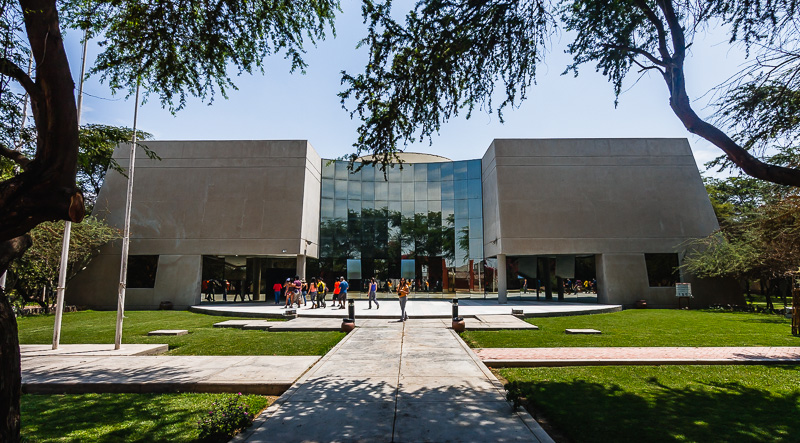
- Location: Ferreñafe, Peru
- Website: https://museos.cultura.pe/museos/museo-nacional-sic%c3%a1n

The Sicán National Museum is a museum in Ferreñafe, Peru, which opened in 2004.

The museum documents the ancient Sican culture.

== See also ==
- List of museums in Peru
