= Museum of Sacred, Magical and Medicinal Plants =

Ethnobotanical museum in Cusco, Peru

Coordinates: 13.5163°S 71.9811°W

- Established: July 8, 2011
- Location: Calle Santa Teresa 351; Cusco, Peru
- Type: Anthropology and Ethnobotany of South America
- Director: Alejandro Camino Diez-Canseco
- Website: www.museoplantascusco.org

The Museum of Sacred, Magical and Medicinal Plants was a privately owned museum located in Cusco, Peru. The Museum was established in 2011 as a non-profit organization. The mission of the Museum was to contribute to the conservation of the vegetal wealth of the Amazon rainforest and the Andes of South America, in particular those plants that contribute to human well-being, and the associated indigenous traditional knowledge on the medicinal, ritual and shamanic use of plant resources.

The museum closed in June 2014.

== Exhibitions ==
=== Permanent exhibits ===
The Museum had several permanent exhibitions in 9 exhibition halls, 5 of which are dedicated to the following plants:

- Erythroxylum coca
- Nicotiana rustica
- Echinopsis pachanoi
- Anadenanthera
- Banisteriopsis caapi and Psychotria viridis

In addition, there was one hall dedicated to the medicinal plants of the Amazon, another to the medicinal plants of the Andes and one on Biopiracy. In the patios of the museum, medicinal plants were also exhibited.

== Other points of interest ==
The Museum Shop had a wide diversity of natural products not easily found elsewhere, as well as indigenous craft arts, books, and magazines. The Museum Restaurant offered a variety of national and international dishes, and a variety of herbal teas.

== See also ==
- List of museums in Peru
