= Procesión de la Bandera =

Ceremony in Peru

Flag procession Procesión de la Bandera
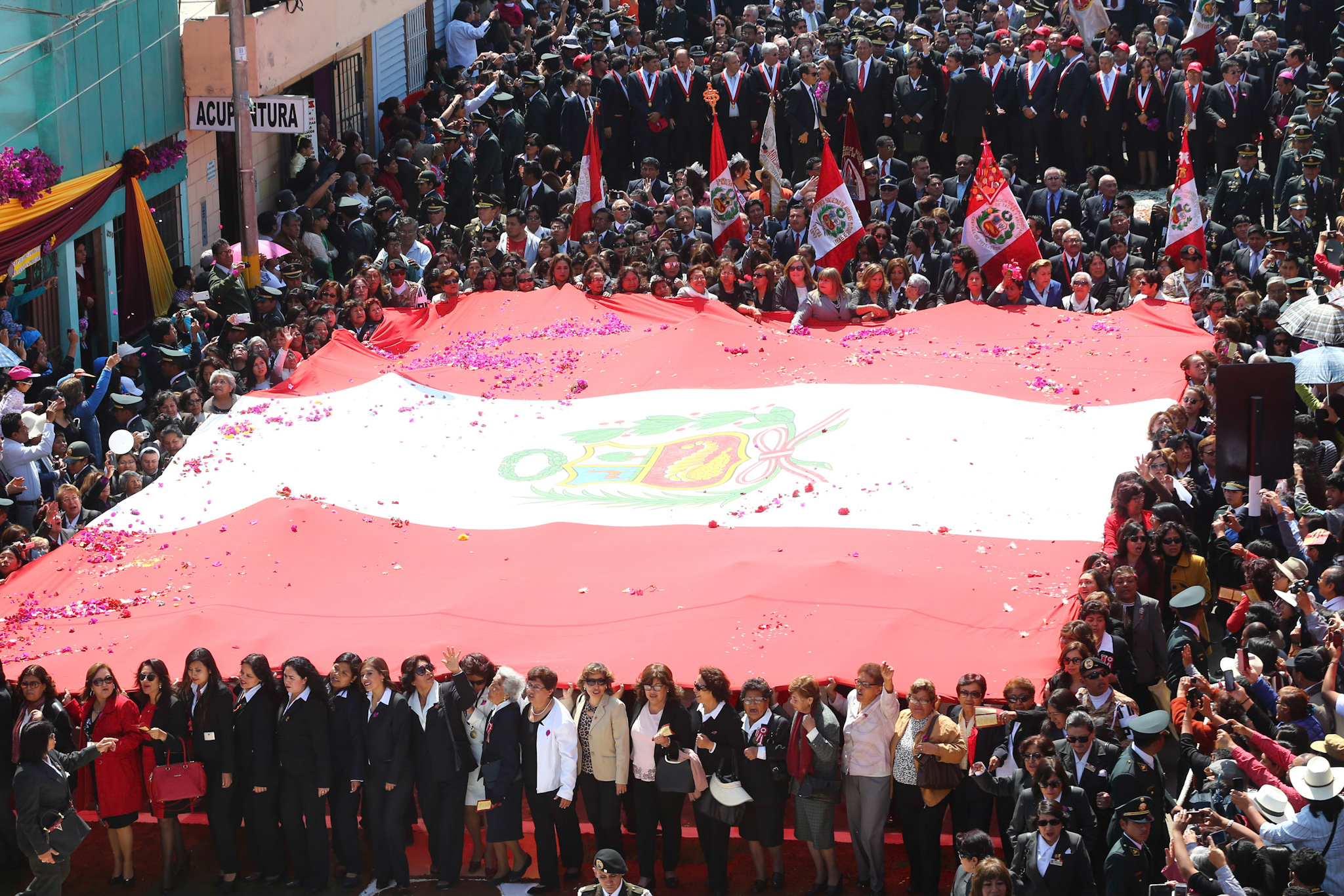
- The ceremony in 2017
- Date: August 28
- Frequency: Annually
- Location: Tacna
- Country: Peru
- Inaugurated: July 28, 1901

The Flag procession (Spanish: Procesión de la Bandera) is a civic-military ceremony held annually in the Peruvian city of Tacna on August 28 with the purpose of commemorating the date on which Tacna Province rejoined Peru after the period of Chilean occupation that lasted from 1880 until 1929, when the Treaty of Lima was signed, as a consequence of the War of the Pacific.

It is part of the Cultural heritage of Peru since 2009.

== History ==
The event that gave rise to the tradition occurred on July 28, 1901, when, still under Chilean administration, a civil association obtained authorization from the occupying country to have the Peruvian flag blessed in the San Ramón Church and paraded through the streets of Tacna on the occasion of celebrating the national holiday of Peru. The event was finally authorized by the Chilean authorities, under the commitment to be carried out under the absolute silence of the Peruvian citizens. Compliance with this agreement allowed it to be carried out in the future and became a symbol for the irredentists. Starting in 1929, this ceremony is held every August 28 as it is the date on which Chile transferred effective control of the province of Tacna to the Peruvian authorities, as a consequence of the Treaty of Lima of 1929.

== See also ==
- Chilean–Peruvian territorial dispute
