= Alto de la Alianza Monumental Complex =

Historical monument near Tacna, Peru

Coordinates: 18.0002°S 70.2939°W

- Complejo Monumental Alto de la Alianza
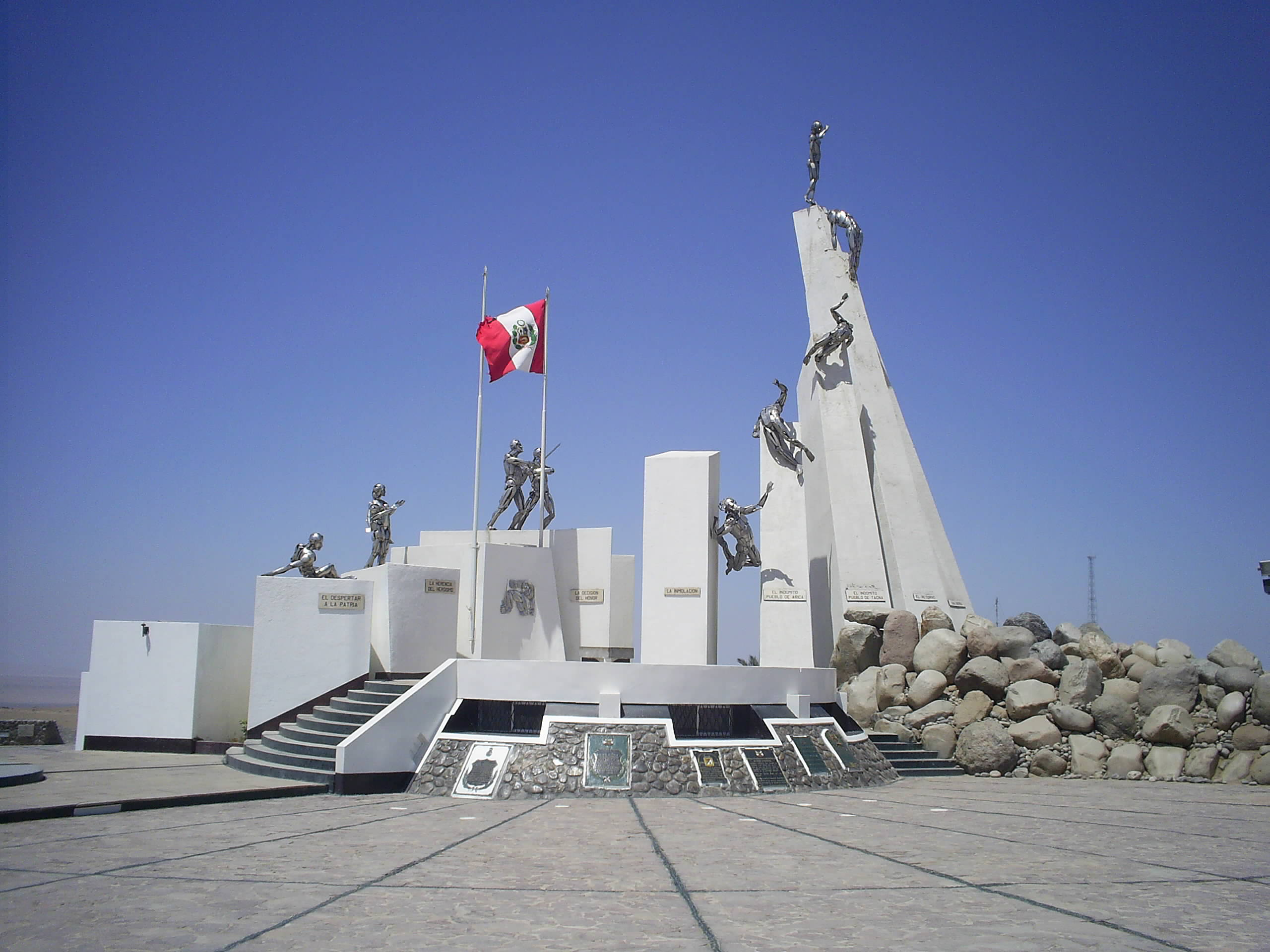
- The monument in 2007
- Interactive map of Alto de la Alianza Monumental Complex
- Location: Tacna, Peru
- Designer: Enrique Vargas Giles, Jorge Espinoza Cáceres
- Type: Memorial
- Beginning date: 1979
- Opening date: May 26, 1983
- Dedicated to: Battle of Tacna

Cultural Heritage of Peru
- Official name: Zona intangible del área territorial que comprende el escenario de la Batalla del Alto de la Alianza
- Type: Immovable tangible
- Criteria: Historic Battle Site
- Designated: 11 November 2008; 17 years ago
- Legal basis: R.D. Nº 1663/INC

The Alto de la Alianza Monumental Complex (Spanish: Complejo Monumental Alto de la Alianza) is a historical monument and landmark complex in the south of Peru, near the city of Tacna.

The monument is located at the plateau of the Intiorko (also known as the Alto de la Alianza), a hill that overlooks the city of Tacna. It is specifically located at the site of the Battle of Tacna, which took place on May 26, 1880, between the allied Bolivian and Peruvian forces against the Chilean Army that resulted in the alliance's retreat and the loss of their strongholds in Arica and Tacna, as well as a period known locally as the captivity of Tacna, part of the larger Chilean–Peruvian territorial dispute that lasted about 50 years.

== Overview ==
The site is on the Intiorko Hill plateau, surrounded by sand and sempervivum plants. It houses a monument in homage to the combatants of the battle. The arch generated by the set of volumes oriented on the east-west axis symbolizes the alliance of the armies of Peru and Bolivia; and its elements or blocks represent the different battalions or contingents that came from both countries.

The volume of stones reflects the direction of the Chilean attack and symbolizes the force that it exerted. The curve, generated by the volumes in opposition to the direction of the stones, symbolizes the battle and the succession of higher plates pointing south, expresses the resistance of the city of Tacna.

== Complex ==
In 1979, the military government presided over by Francisco Morales Bermúdez determined the construction of a large monumental complex, located on the plain to the northeast of Intiorko hill; The project and construction of the monument were under the direction of architect Enrique Vargas Giles and engineer Jorge Espinoza Cáceres respectively and the sculptural part was assumed by Holger Carpio Deztre.

=== Museum ===
The Campo de la Alianza Site Museum is a war museum located under the Alto de la Alianza monument, it was inaugurated on May 26, 1982.

=== Monument ===
The monument features the previously described arch feature and ornate surroundings, as well as a cemetery in its vicinity with over 700 crosses representing the regiments and individuals that fought and were killed in action during the battle. In the cemetery stands a large marble cross that features a message by historians Jorge Basadre Grohmann and José Jiménez Borja in homage to the combatants of the Battles of Tacna (05-26-1880) and Arica (06-07-1880).

To those who fell defending the freedom of Tacna and Arica, in the battles of May and June 1880, we pay homage with this cross full of thoughts rendered to their memory. They were strong men, for whom life was worth nothing in indignity and slavery. They inhabit the peaceful and laughing expanse of the valleys, they loved all men and did not crave the wealth of the stranger.

But when unjust aggression threatened the integrity of their right, they rose to form a barrier with their bodies, at the gate of their beloved cities. The enemy overwhelmed this barrier only when all his blood, like a dejected flame, ran covering the arenas of combat.

At the moment when the reparation of justice, which they defended, approaches, their memory rises like a rutile star to preside over the triumphant march of the banners.

— Jorge Basadre Grohmann & José Jiménez Borja

The monument is also accompanied by eight stainless steel sculptures created by the artist Holguer Caprio Dextre, with the purpose of resisting the environment of the area, and as a modern technique that has allowed advances and sculptural boasts. The set summarizes actions and attitudes of the history of the city of Tacna, heroism, resurgence and projection into the future.

Name	Description
The awakening of the Homeland (Spanish: El despertar de la Patria)	The first sculpture is represented by a figure who is sitting up, evokes the emancipatory deed of Francisco Antonio de Zela in 1811 and represents the popular reaction to defend territorial integrity in the face of aggression.
The heritage of heroism (Spanish: La herencia del heroísmo)	The second sculpture shows the mother teaching her son the heroic tradition, as well as the delivery that the people made of their scarce resources and the lives of their children.
The decision of honour (Spanish: La decisión del Honor)	The third sculpture shows two soldiers holding a weapon, it represents the Peruvian-Bolivian alliance in defense of sovereignty against the enemy army.
Martyrdom (Spanish: La Inmolación)	The fourth sculpture symbolizes the tragedy of the battle and the sacrifice of the defenders before the deployment of enemy means.
Indomitable people of Arica (Spanish: Indómito pueblo de Arica)	The fifth sculpture symbolizes the suffering part of the captivity of Arica.
Indomitable people of Tacna (Spanish: Indómito pueblo de Tacna)	The sixth sculpture symbolizes the suffering part of the captivity of Tacna.
The return to the Homeland (Spanish: El retorno a la Patria)	The seventh sculpture is an effigy that stands in a stoic attitude that represents the reincorporation of Tacna to Peru.
The Homeland (Spanish: La Patria)	The eight and final sculpture crowns the Monumental Complex and symbolizes the welcome of Tacna on its return to the homeland.

== Gallery ==
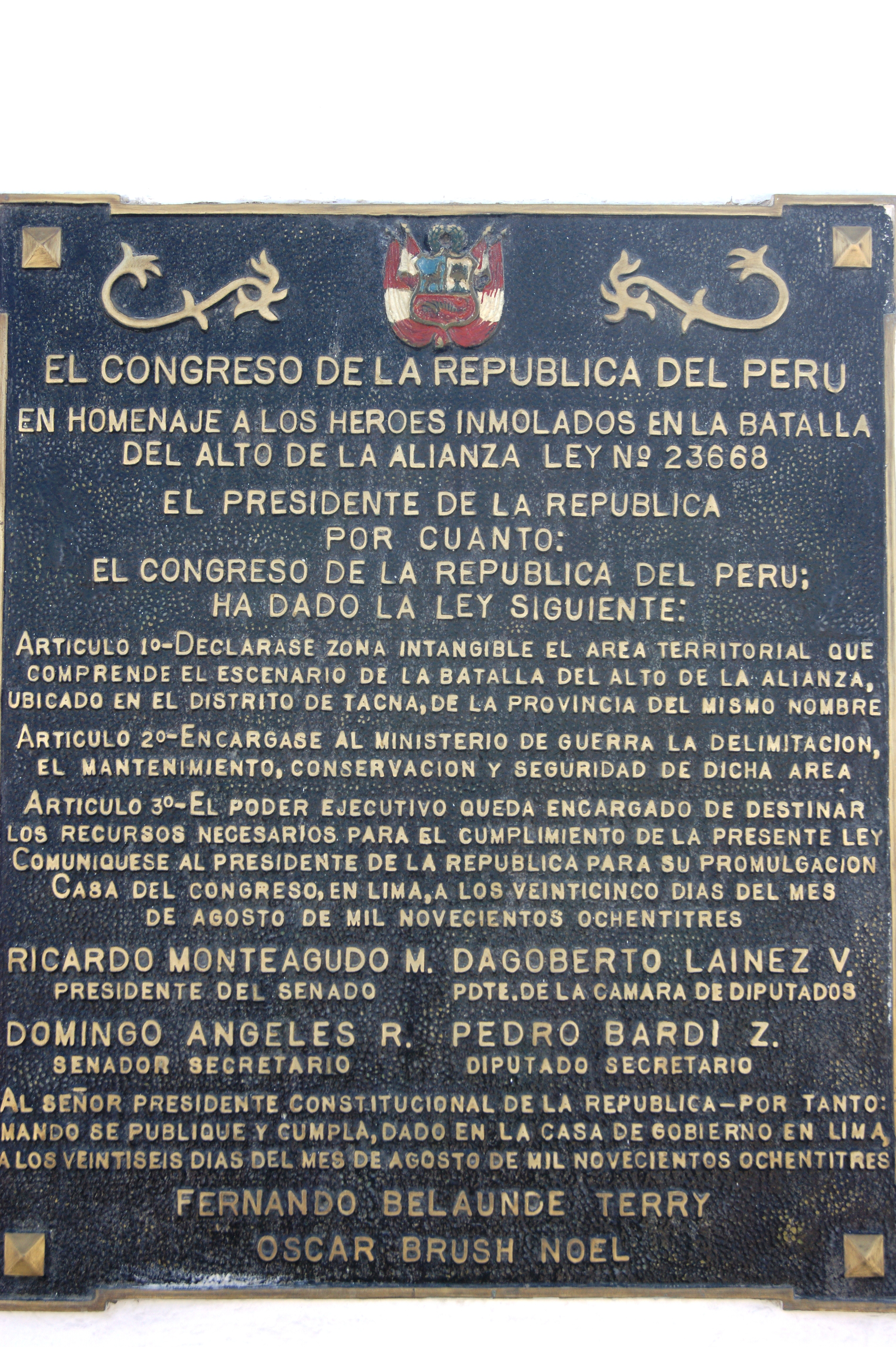
Inauguration plaque of the complex

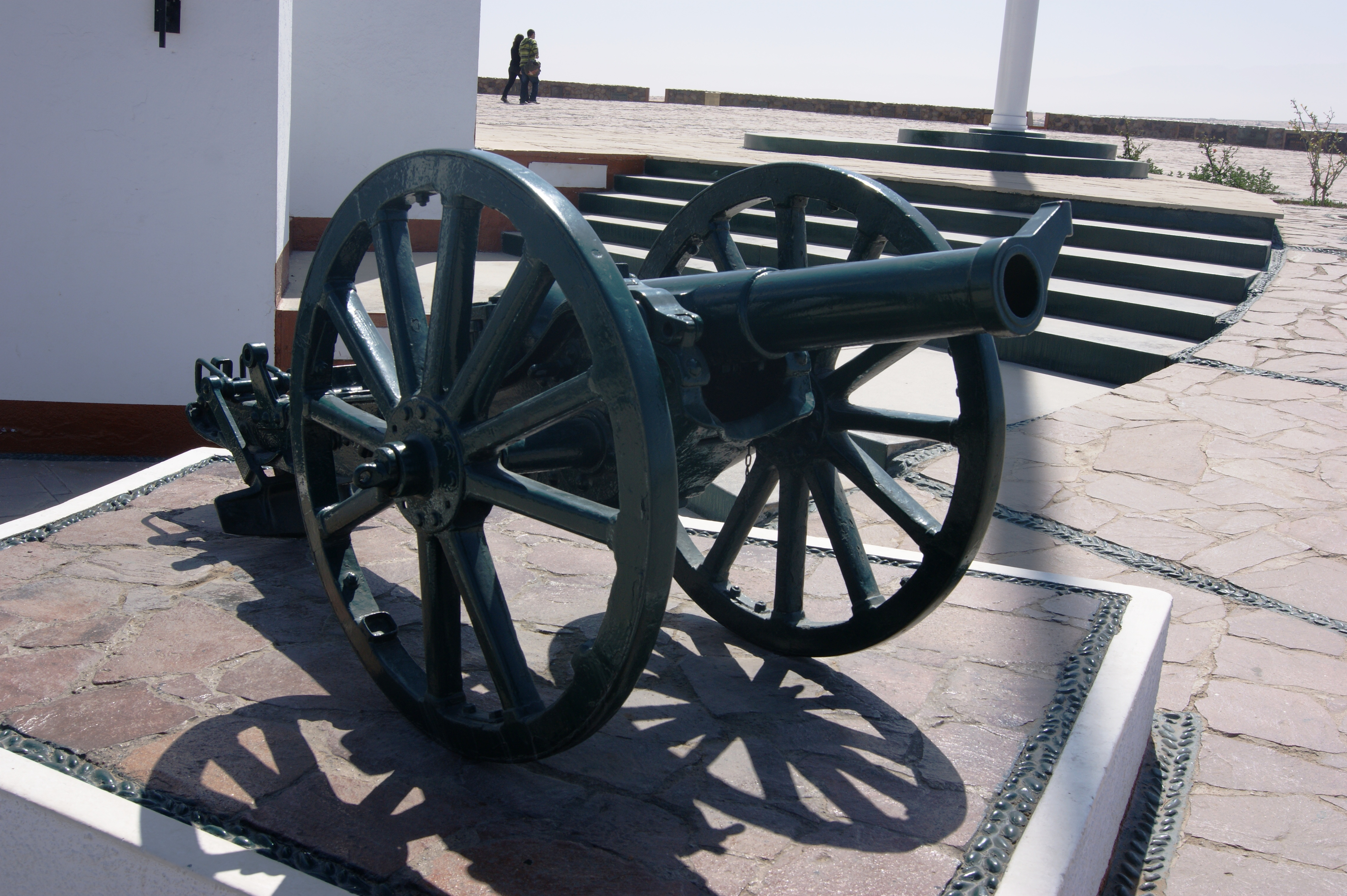
Cannon outside the museum

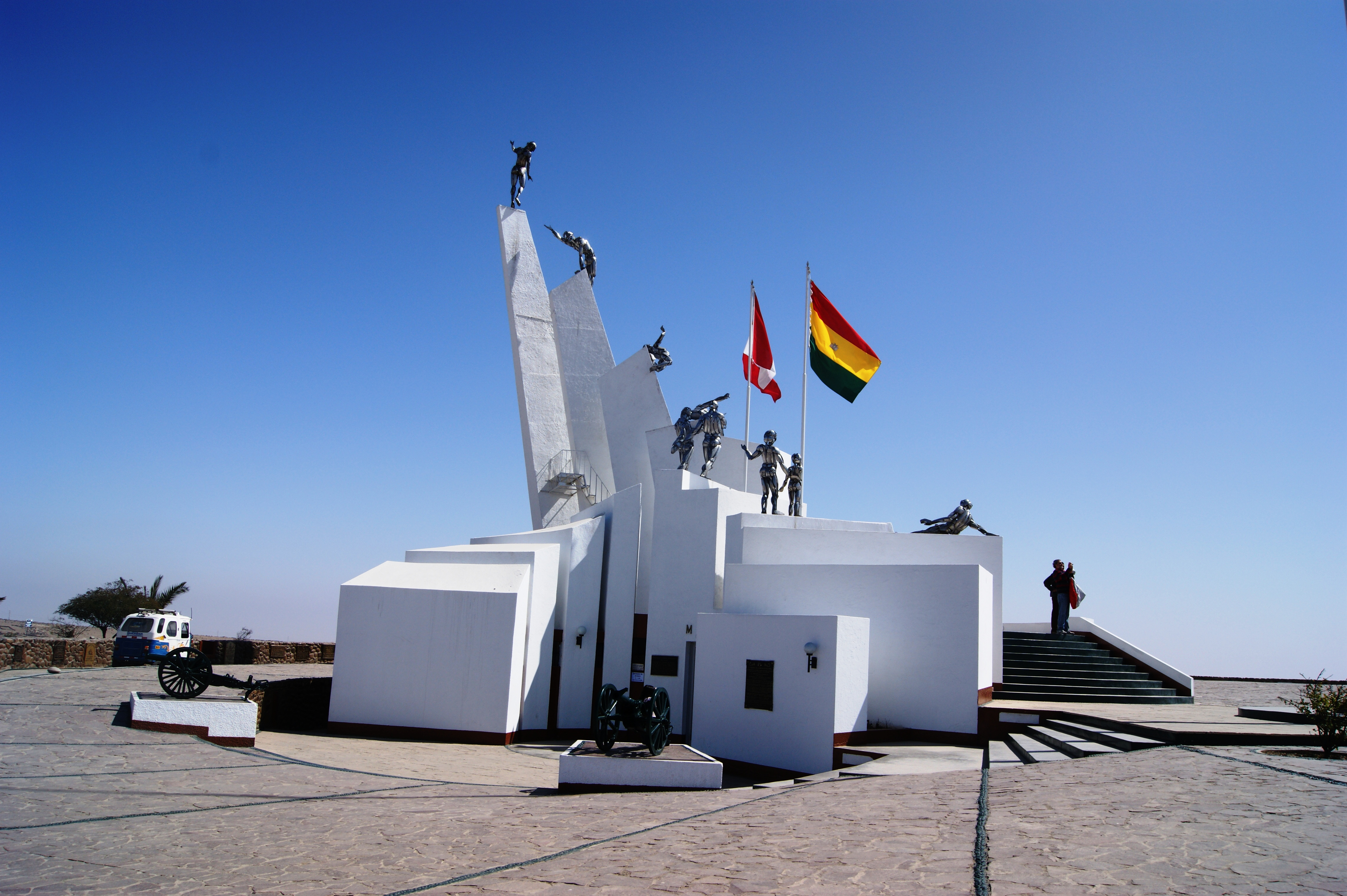
Posterior view and entrance to the museum

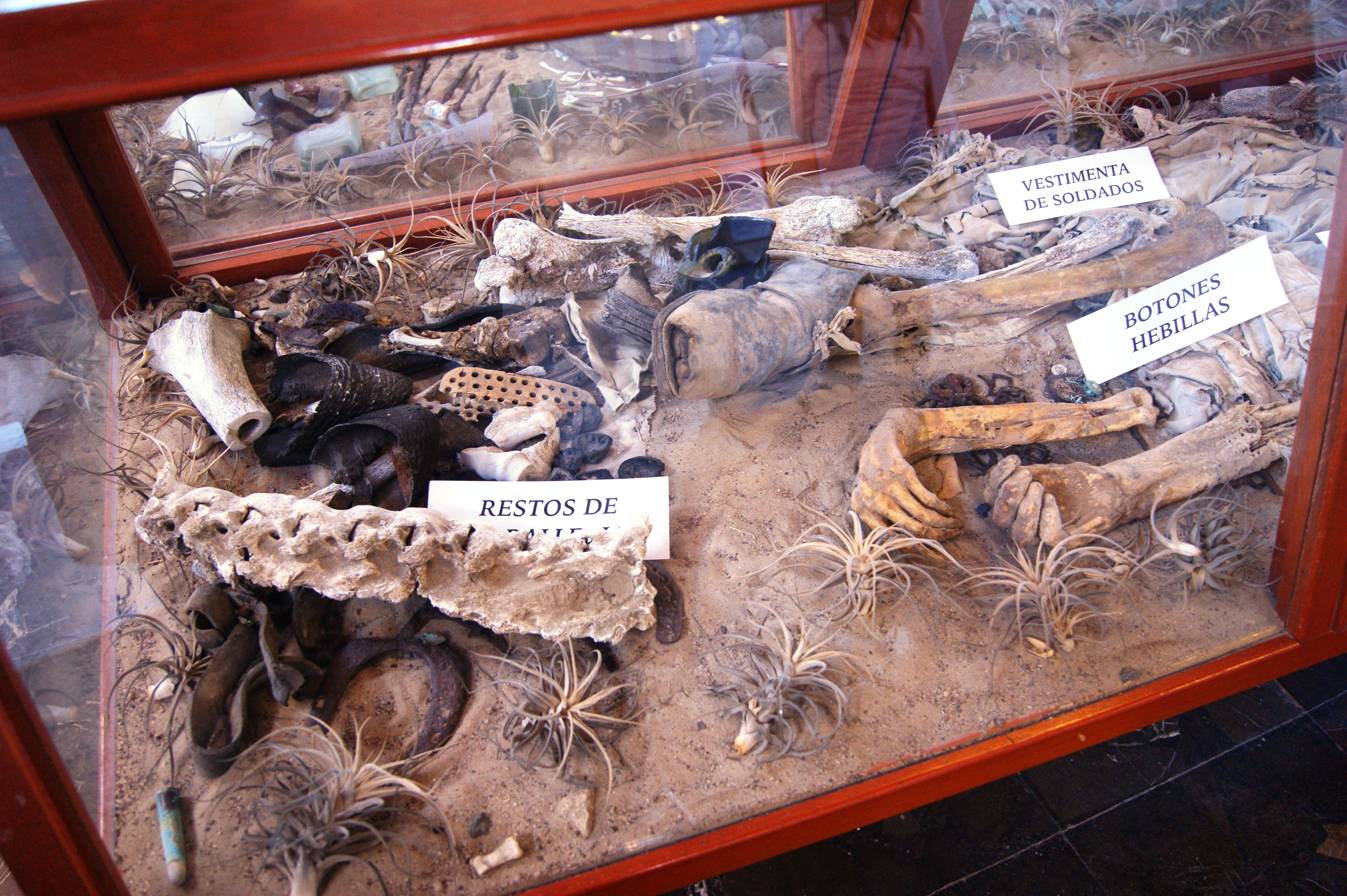
Human remains in the museum

== See also ==
- Cultural heritage of Peru

== Bibliography ==
- Conociendo Tacna 2011 (in Spanish). Instituto Nacional de Estadística e Informática. 2011. p. 199.
