= Intiorko Hill =

Hill in Peru

Coordinates: 17°59′25″S 70°15′31″W

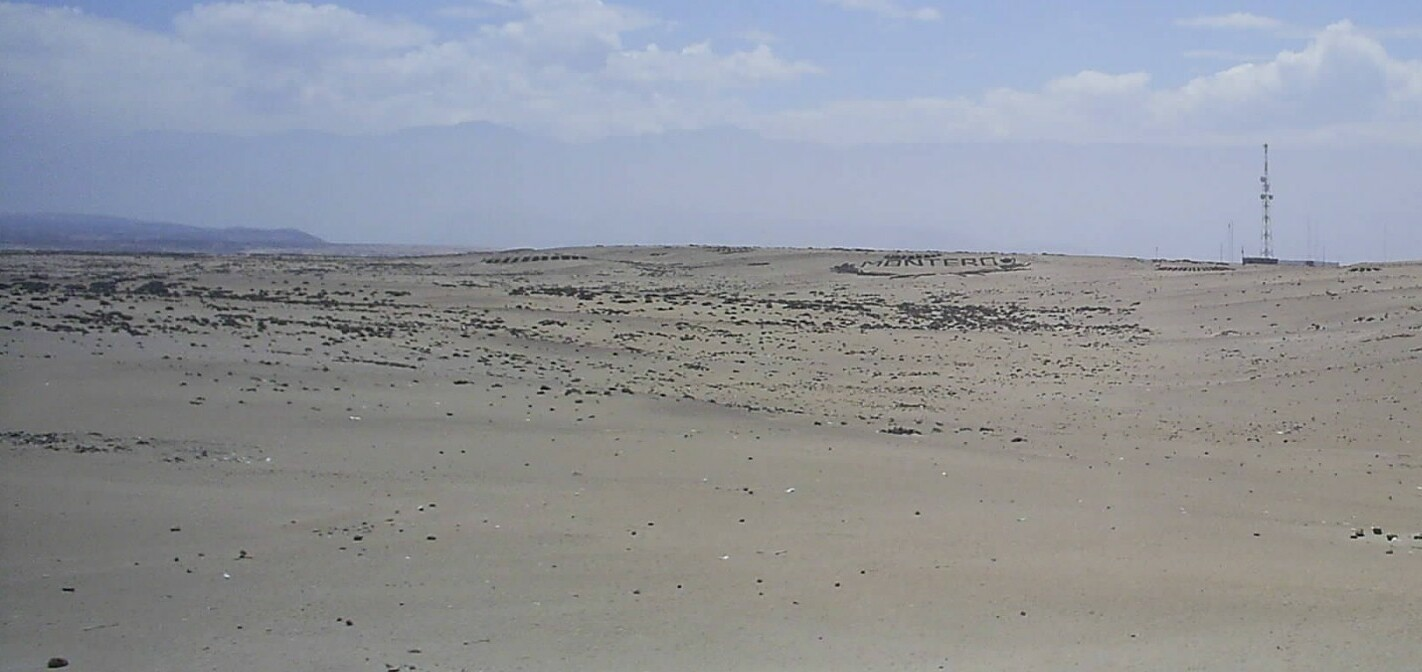
- View of the hill's plateau

Highest point
- Elevation: 780 m.a.s.l.

Geography
- Country: Peru
- Department: Tacna
- Province: Tacna

Intiorko, also known as the Alto de la Alianza (lit. 'Hill of the Alliance'), is a 780-m.a.s.l. hill located in Tacna, Peru. An important landmark of the city, its stone has been used for the construction of many of its landmarks, such as the Cathedral, the Parabolic Arch and the Prefecture.

The hill is the site of the Alto de la Alianza Monumental Complex, a museum that commemorates the eponymous battle (itself named after the hill's plateau), and the Santísima Cruz Del Cerro Intiorko, a chapel and a place of pilgrimage during Holy Week.

== Etymology ==
Intiorko (or Inti Urqu), from Inti (The Inca sun god) and Urqu (Hill), is a Quechua name, translated to Spanish as Alto del Sol (Hill of the Sun). The hill and its plateau are also known as the Alto de la Alianza (Campo de la Alianza) since May 16, 1880, at the initiative of Bolivian general Juan José Pérez.

== History ==
The hill, which overlooks the city, was renamed to the 'Hill of the Alliance' (Alto de la Alianza) on May 16, 1880, at the initiative of Bolivian general Juan José Pérez. Ten days later, it would be the site of a large-scale battle during the War of the Pacific.

On September 19, 1901, the Crypt of the Heroes was erected by the Chilean administration to honour their dead during the conflict.

== Geography ==
The hill has old rock falls at its bottom, where homes have also been built. On the slopes of the hill, you can see suspended blocks that could give way to a seismic movement. In order to prevent possible landslides, the inhabitants of the area have built retaining walls and other structures without technical advice, which represents risks "constructed" by the population themselves.

These findings highlight the importance of conducting geological assessments in risk areas, such as in Intiorko, to identify and mitigate existing geological hazards. Recommendations derived from a 2017 study could include additional security measures, technical advice for the construction of containment structures and raising public awareness about the risks associated with locating homes in geologically unstable areas.

=== Tuff ===
In the south of Peru there is a large number of deposits of pyroclastic flows that cover large tubes due to the effect of pressure and temperature. The pyroclastic flows devitrify and weld together and spread during the volcanic action, forming a kind of roots that extend along the Intiorko hill, with a special pinkish color due to its proximity to the coast and the summer heat, it is a very special and unusual type of ashlar, but it was used for the construction of the main monuments of the city, such as the Basadre house, the Parabolic Arch, the Tacna Prefecture, the Cathedral, and the Zela House.

== See also ==
- Ticalaco River
