= Zela House =

Museum in Tacna, Peru

Coordinates: 18°00′43″S 70°14′59″W

Casa Zela
- Location: Calle Zela 542, Tacna

Zela House (Spanish: Casa Zela), also called Zela City Museum (Spanish: Casa Museo Zela), is a museum located at San Martín Avenue, in the historic centre of Tacna, Peru. The building is a former residence of Francisco Antonio de Zela, who participated in the 1811 Tacna rebellion, an important episode preceding the Peruvian War of Independence.

== History ==
On June 20, 1811, Tacna was the scene of the first cry of Independence of Peru. Francisco Antonio de Zela, an important precursor of Peruvian independence, once lived in this property. The house, located in block No. 5 of Zela Street, was declared a Historical Monument on June 20, 1961 by Resolution No. 243.

Today, it is the Salón Museo Arqueológico (Archeological Museum Hall) where ceramic and textile pieces, works of wood and metal, and pre-Hispanic fishing and basket weaving tools are displayed.

In 2012, paintings were stolen from the museum.

== See also ==
- Francisco Antonio de Zela
