= Francisco Antonio de Zela =

Peruvian rebel (1768–1820)

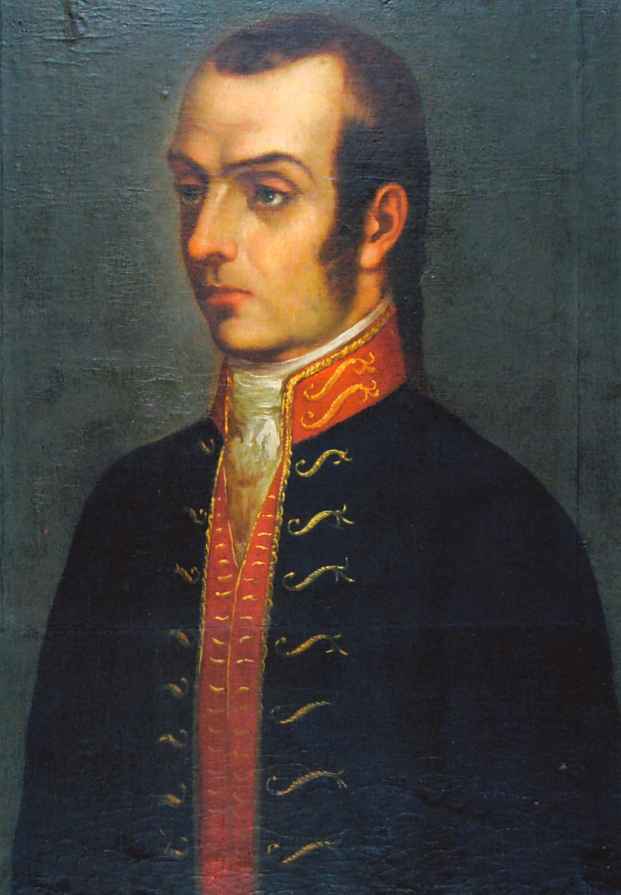

Personal details
- Born: 24 July 1768 Lima, Viceroyalty of Peru, Spanish Empire
- Died: 18 July 1819 (aged 50) Chagres, Panama
- Spouse: María de la Natividad Siles y Antequera
- Profession: Soldier

Francisco Antonio de Zela y Arizaga (July 24, 1768, in Lima – July 18, 1819, in Panama City) is notable for sending forth the first anti-Spanish rebellion in the Peruvian city of Tacna on June 20, 1811, in an attempt to start the independence of Peru. De Zela was supported by a large group of criollos, mestizos and Indians, among them the caciques José Rosa Ara and Miguel Copaja.

== Military career ==
The rebellion of Tacna was in close contact with the Argentine revolution, initiated in Buenos Aires on May 25, 1810. The Argentines sent an army to the Charcas region (Bolivia), under the command of general Antonio González de Balcarce and the lawyer Juan José Castelli. They sent proclamations to various towns in southern Peru, inviting them to follow them in the revolution. The town of Tacna was the first under the direction of Francisco Antonio de Zela, occupying the quarters of the Spanish authorities that night.

On the same day (June 20) the Argentine army was defeated by Spanish forces in the Battle of Huaqui, bordering Lake Titicaca, and thus De Zela never received the needed support. This news created a morale problem for De Zela's troops and as a result, they were defeated by the Spaniards. The main leaders of the rebellion were caught, among them De Zela, and they were led to Lima and condemned to 10 years in the military prison of Chagres, Panama, where De Zela died.

His house, located on Zela Street #542, was named a Historical Monument on July 26, 1961, and to this day continues to be one of the major tourist attractions of the city of Tacna.

June 20 is a local holiday in city of Tacna.

== See also ==
- Battle of Huaqui
- History of Peru
