= Gold Museum of Peru and Arms of the World =

Museum in Lima, Peru

Coordinates: 12°06′28″S 76°57′59″W

- Museo Oro del Perú y Armas del Mundo
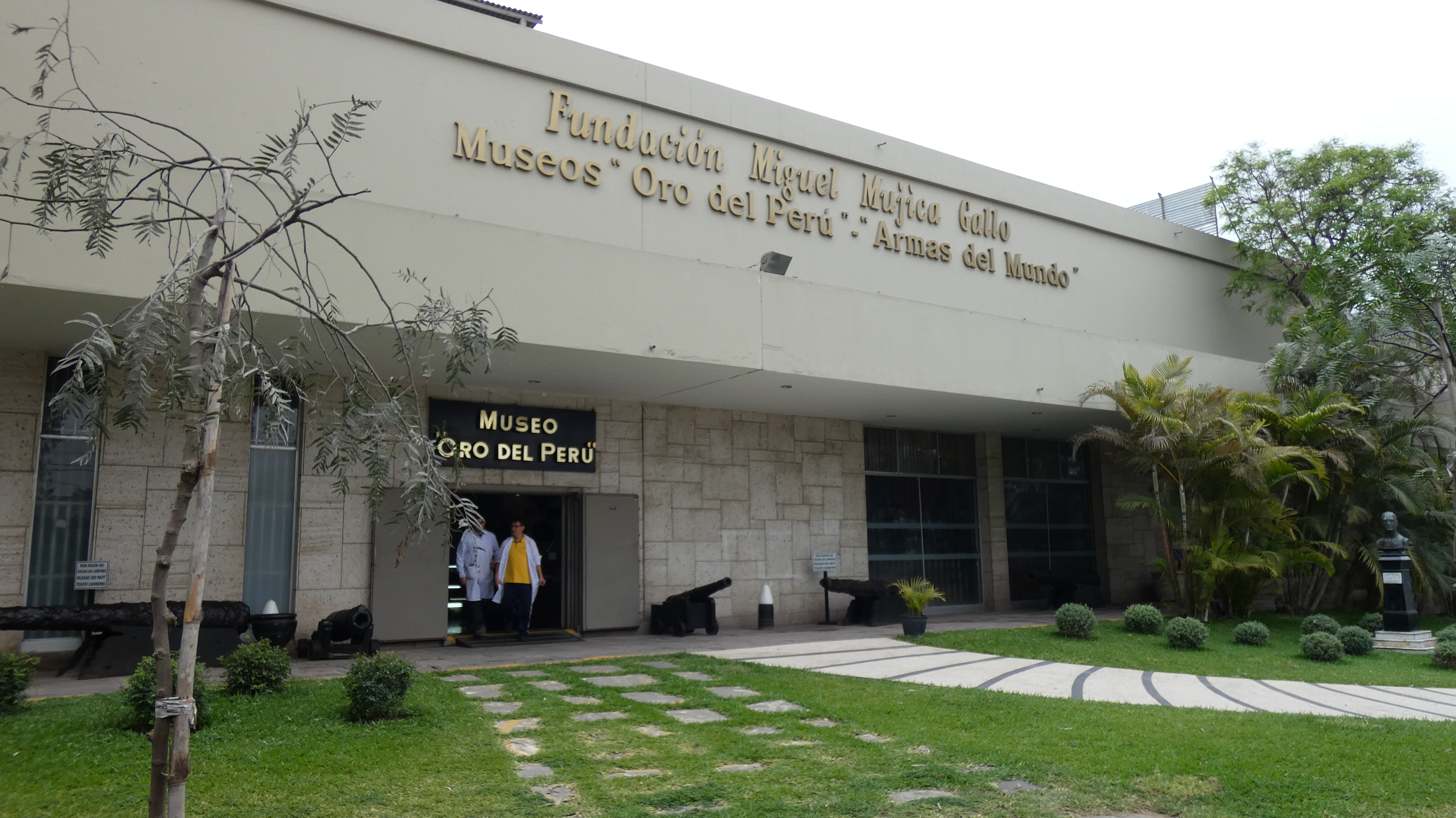
- Established: 1968
- Location: Alonso de Molina 1100, Monterrico, Santiago de Surco, Lima, Peru
- Type: Archaeology and War museum
- Collection size: 20,000+ items
- Founder: Miguel Mujica Gallo
- Website: museoroperu.com.pe

The Gold Museum of Peru and Weapons of the World (Spanish: Museo Oro del Perú y Armas del Mundo), also known simply as the Gold Museum of Peru (Spanish: Museo Oro del Perú, MOdP) is a Peruvian archaeology and war museum located in the neighbourhood of Monterrico, Santiago de Surco, Lima.

== History ==
The museum was founded by diplomat and avid hunter Miguel Mujica Gallo in the 1960s in order to display his lifelong private collection of pre-Incan gold pieces and arms of the world, owning it until 1993. It is in a two-story building made of reinforced concrete and accessed through a vault-style entrance. The museum was donated to the Peruvian State by Gallo and is now administered by the Miguel Mujica Gallo Foundation, which is currently directed by Victoria Mujica Diez Canseco, the founder's daughter.

Mujica's residence is located next to the museum, as is a restaurant established in the early 1980s, all part of the same property. Originally known as the Pabellón de Caza, the work of architect Luis Risso Arguedas and gastronomic businessman Arturo Rubio, it was one of the most popular of its time. The original gate was designed by Rubio and Javier Ferrand, and was reinforced after a terrorist attack destroyed it. Its Bwana Grill, later the Amadeus nightclub, was also very popular at the time.

In 2002, the museum was the subject of controversy, as a four-month study carried out by the Pontifical Catholic University of Peru led to an investigation by the Consumer Defence Institute, the Peruvian government's intellectual property organisation, declared 4,257 artefacts in the museum as fakes, with an additional 92 put into question. The organisation had doubted the pieces' authenticity since the 1980s and reported that 85% of the pieces were of illegitimate authenticity. Peruvian congressman Luis Iberico suggested that a mafia organisation could have taken advantage of Mujica's deteriorating eyesight, replacing legitimate items with imitations.

In 2024, a number of items in the collection were temporarily moved to Rio de Janeiro as part of an exhibition of Peruvian culture and history held at the Centro Cultural Banco do Brasil.

== Collections ==
Mujica acquired over 7,000 gold artifacts belonging to pre-Columbian cultures and made out of precious metals such as gold, silver and platinum, in addition to multiple textiles, ceramics, mummies and other valuables. The collection is valued at over $10 million. Four pre-Incan cultures are featured in the collection: Vicus, Moche, Sican and Chimu. Additionally, items belonging to the Inca Empire are also featured.

Mujica also collected over 20,000 weapons from around the world, the oldest dated from the 13th century. The collection also includes military uniforms, saddles, armor, spurs and other objects.

== Gallery ==
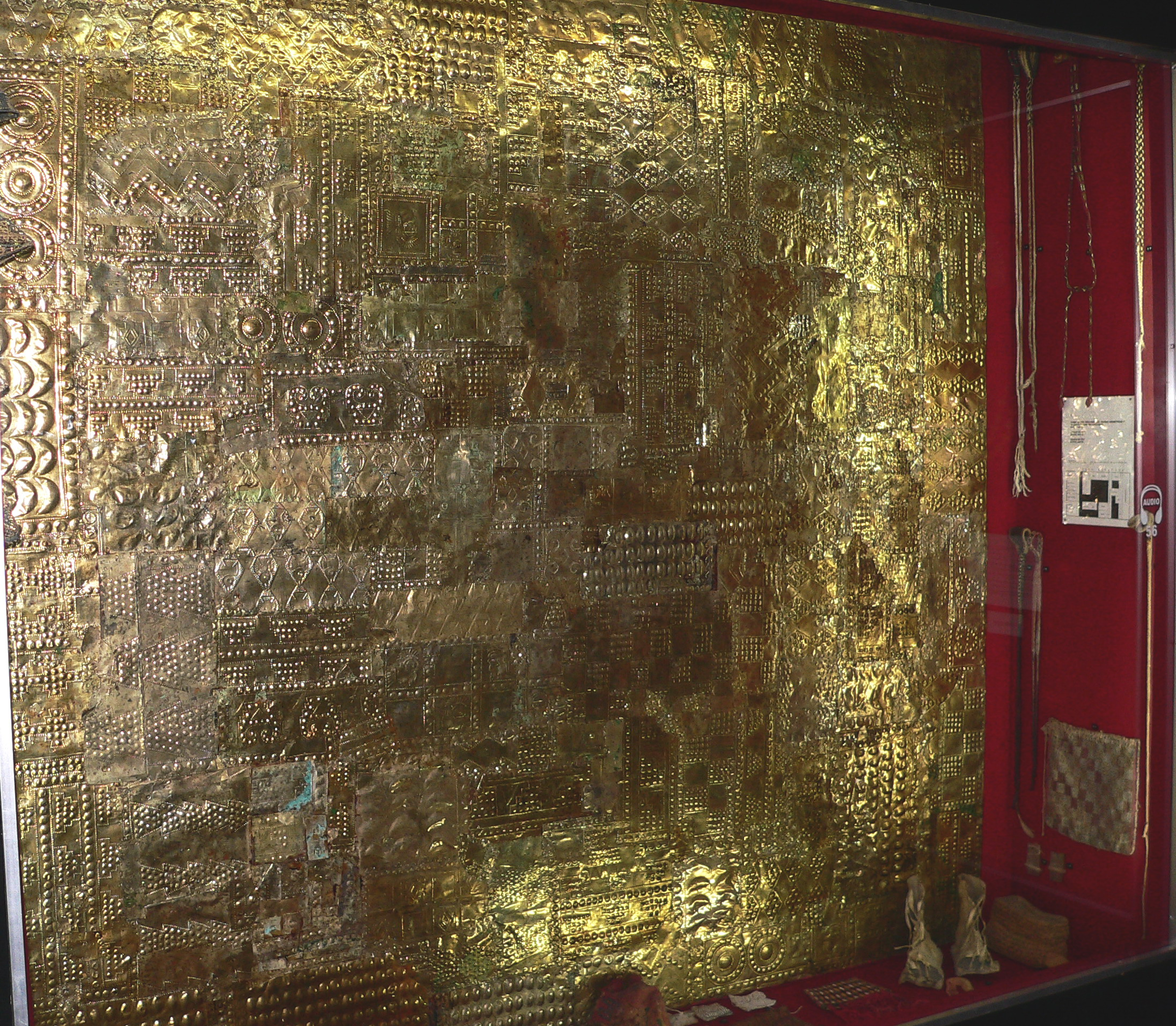
Thick gold plate for wall cladding. Inca Culture

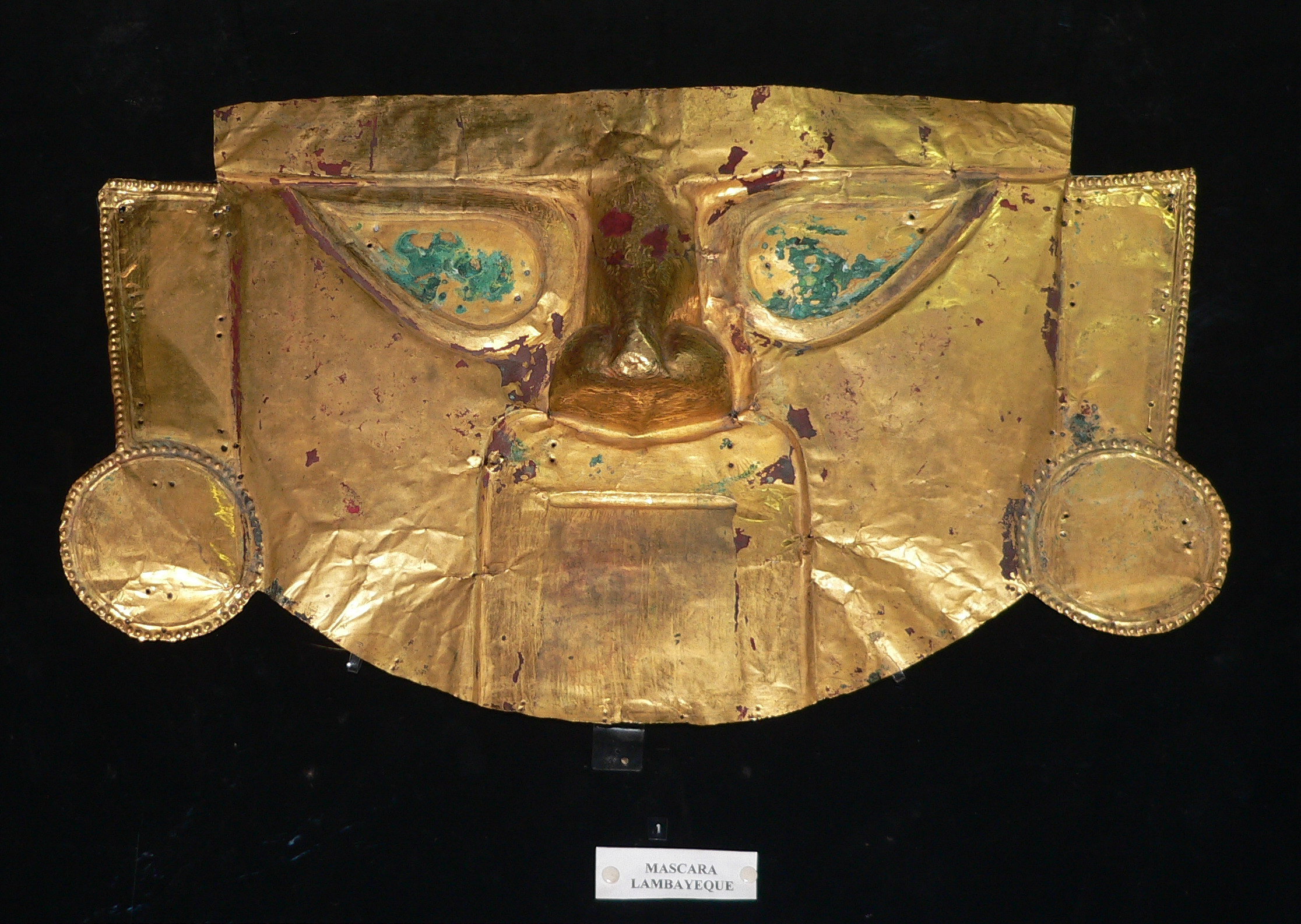
Golden Mask of the Sican culture, Peru

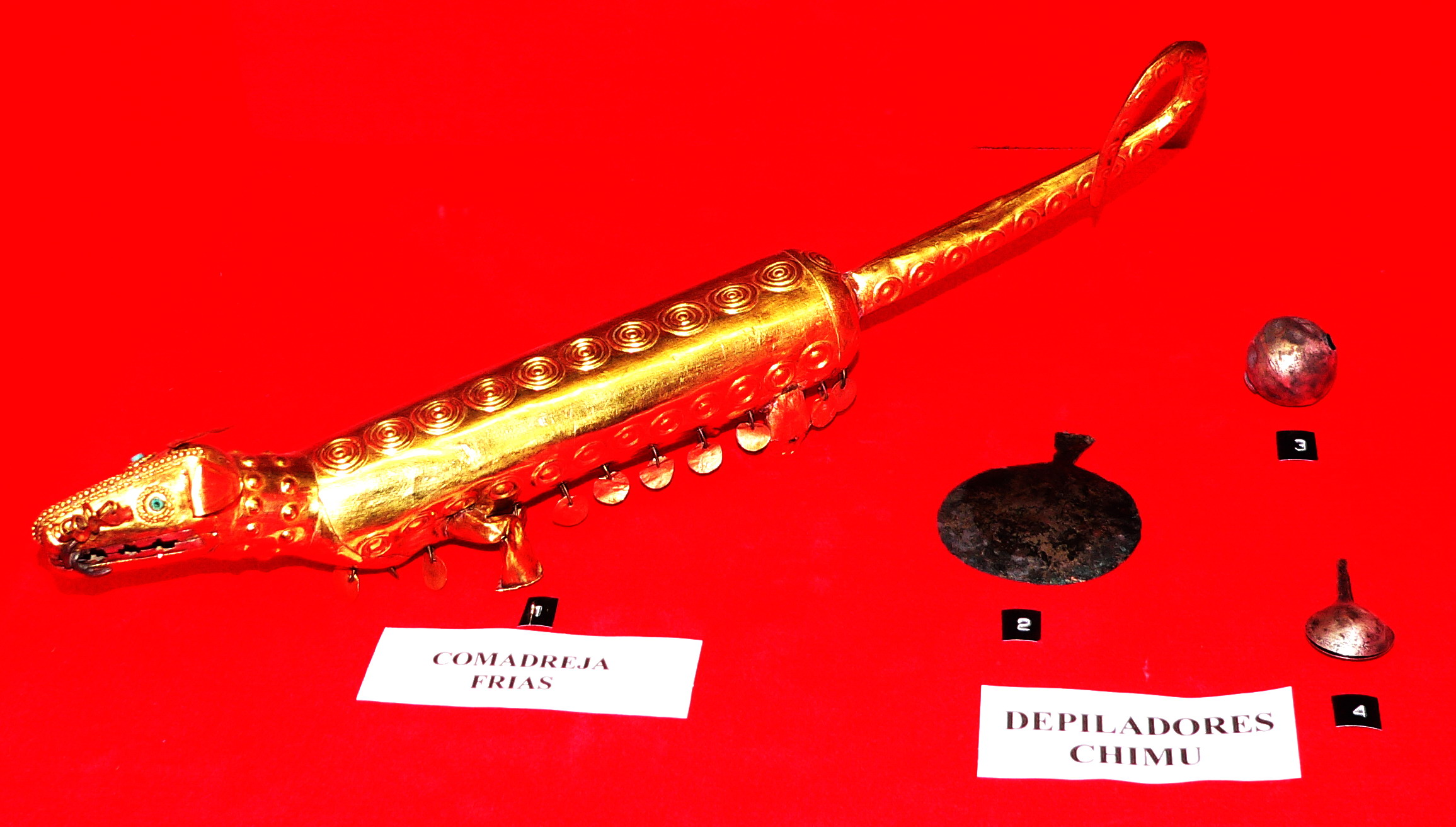
Golden Weasel of the Frías culture, Peru

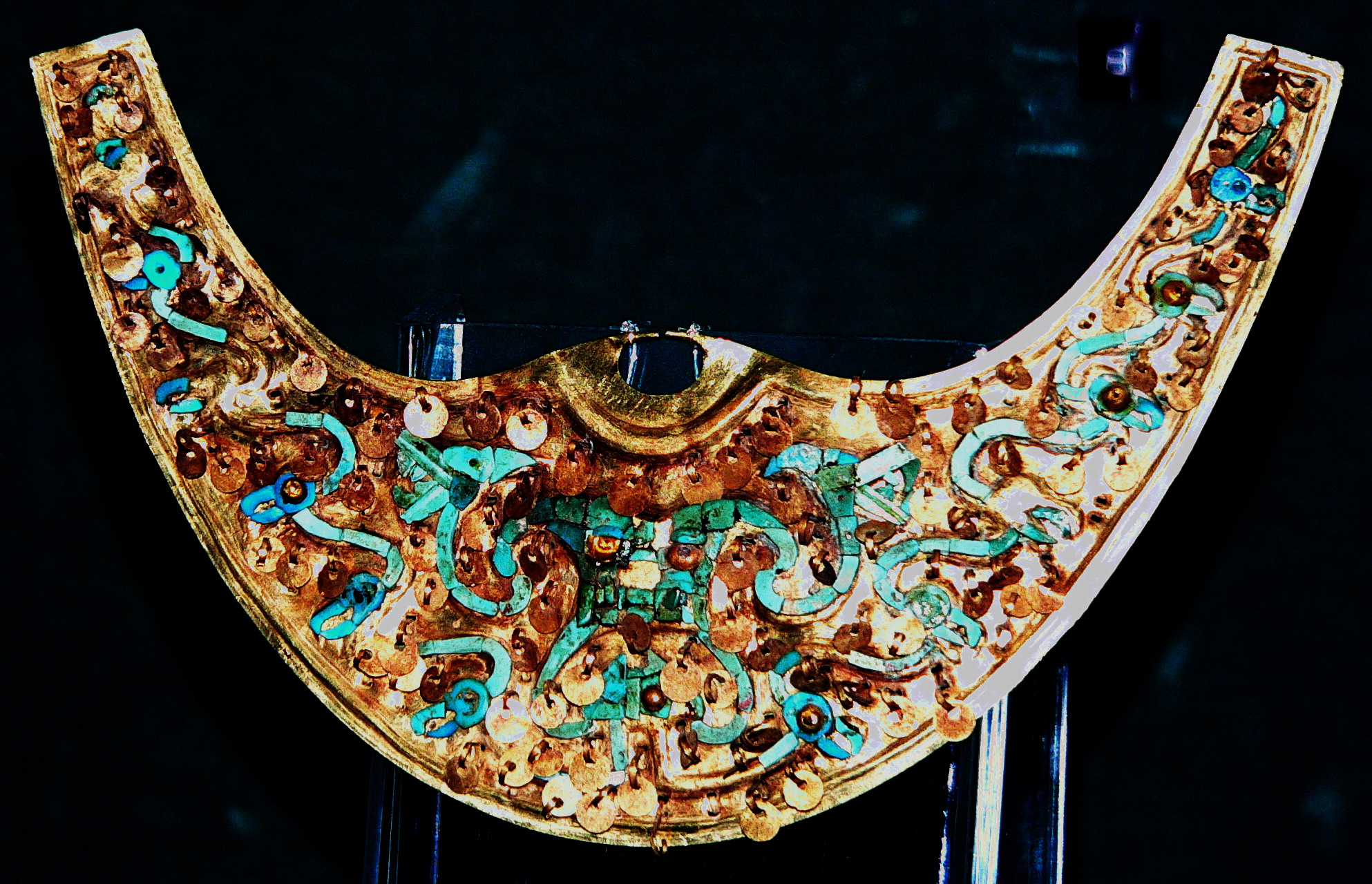
Nose ring of the Moche culture.

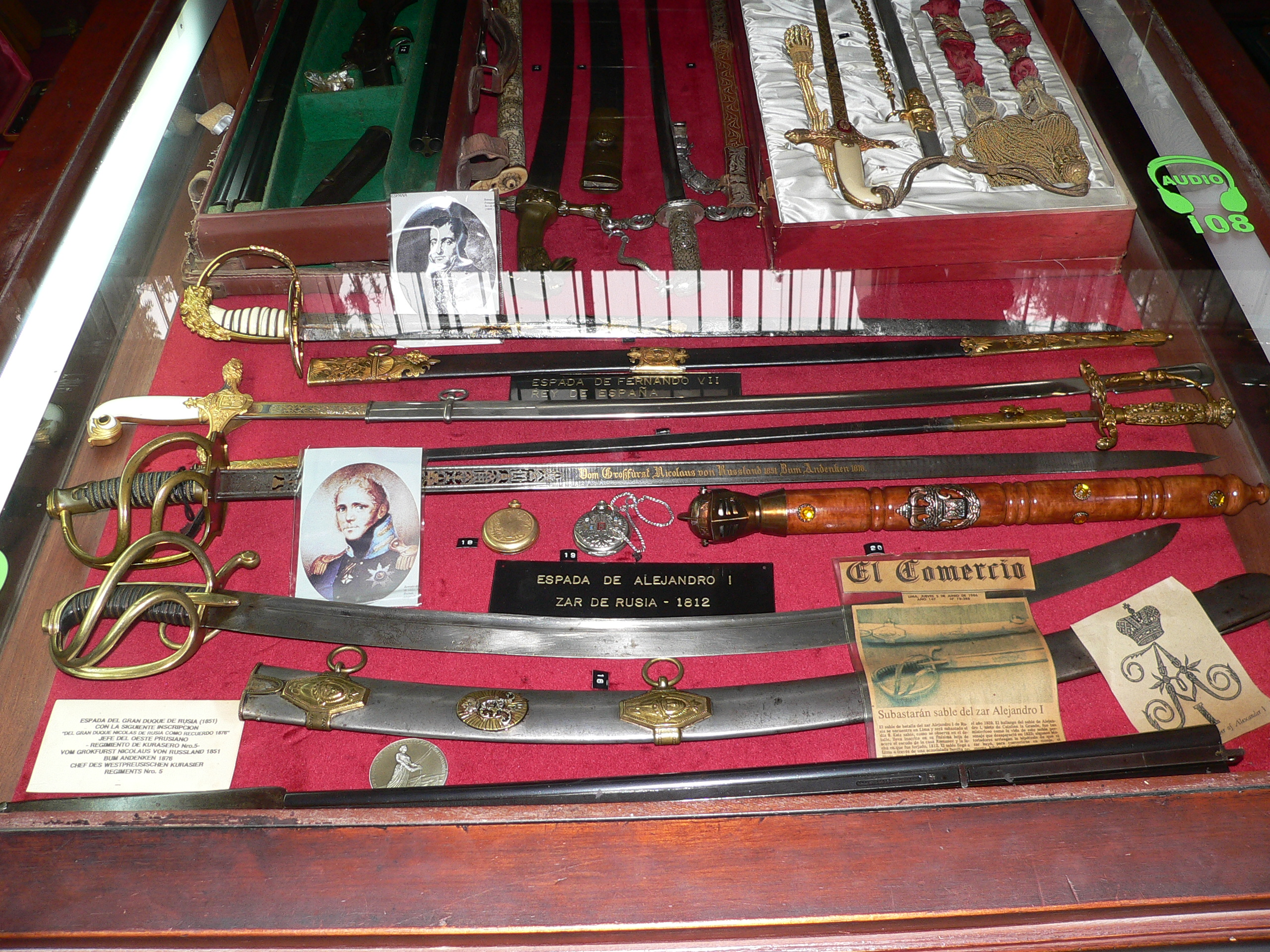
Swords of Alexander I and Ferdinand VII

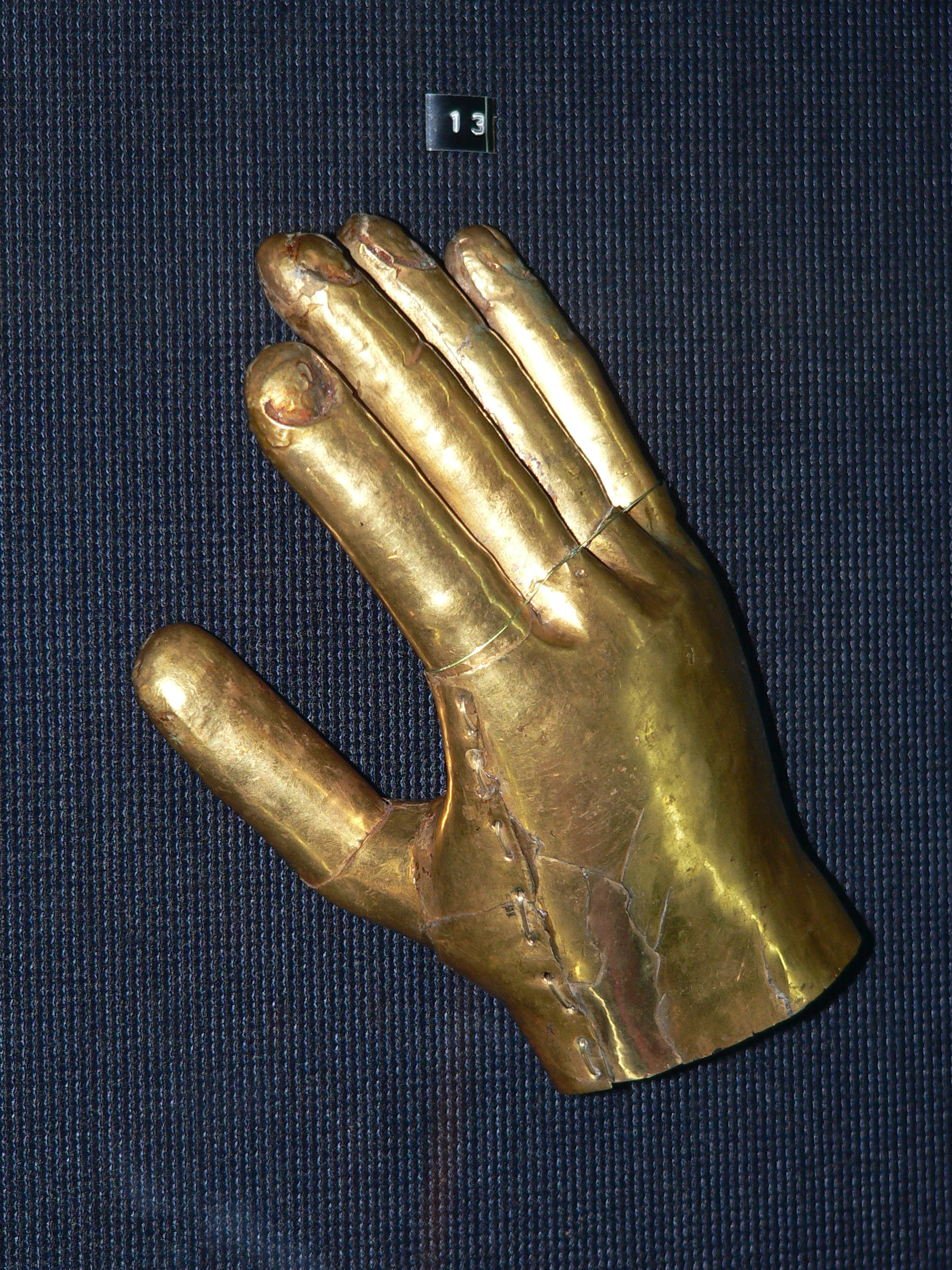
Golden Glove of the Sican culture

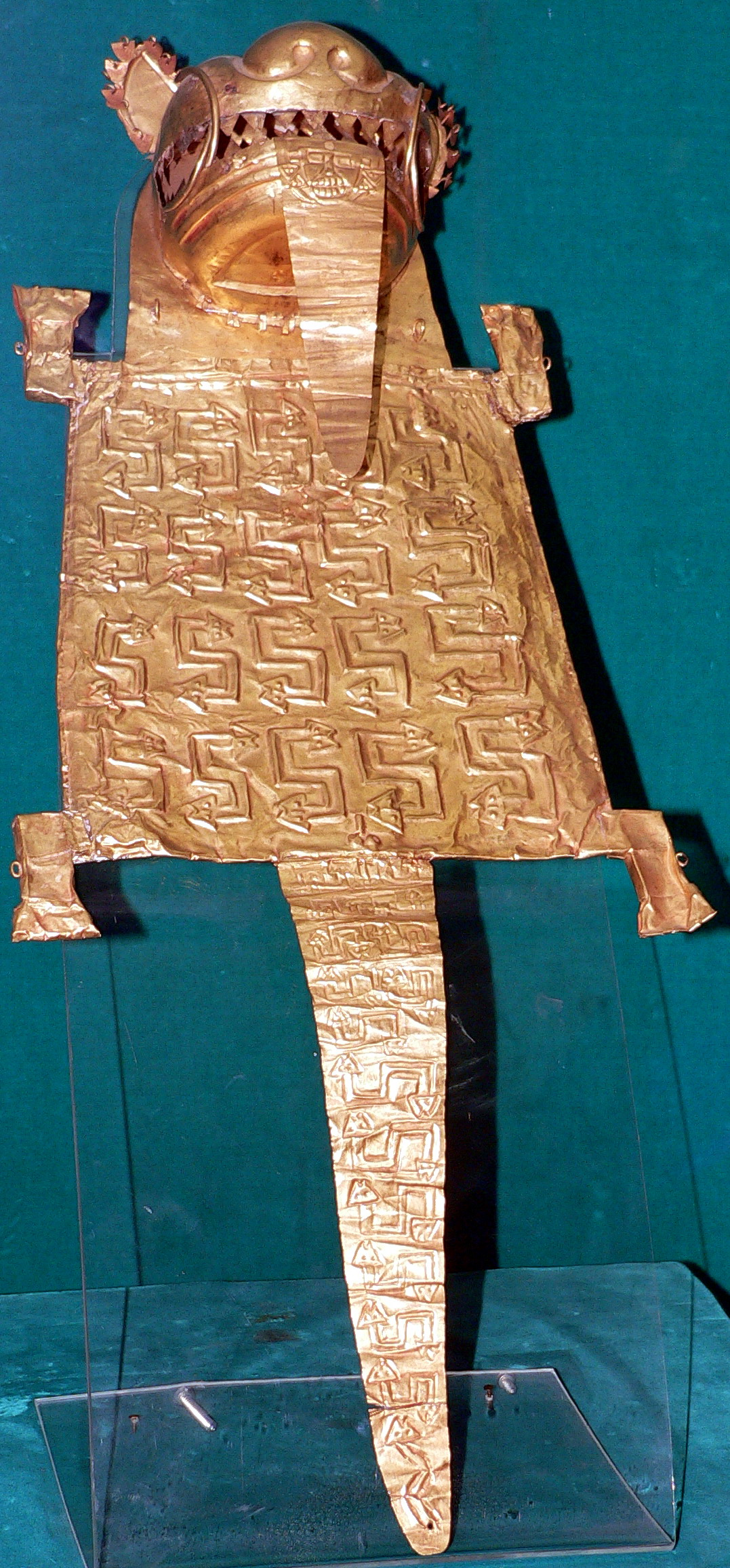
Ceremonial bag of the Frías culture

== See also ==
- Santiago de Surco
