= 1811 Tacna rebellion =

1811 rebellion in Peru

- Part of the Peruvian War of Independence
Date	June 1811
Location	Tacna, Intendancy of Arequipa, Viceroyalty of Peru (now Peru)
Result	Royalist victory; Outbreak of the Peruvian War of Independence and the autonomous intendancies revolts throughout the Viceroyalty of Perú

Belligerents
Tacnian rebels Co-belligerents: United Provinces of the Río de la Plata	Spain: (Spain) Peru

Commanders and leaders
Francisco Antonio de Zela	José Fernando de Abascal

The First Tacna uprising or Tacna insurrection of 1811 was an autonomist movement that occurred in Tacna in June 1811 that proclaimed the freedom of Peru against the Spanish government of Viceroy José Fernando de Abascal y Sousa, with Tacna being the first and the only city that rose in 1811, anticipating the advance of the Argentine armies in Upper Peru. Although the patriots were defeated, this marked the outbreak of the Peruvian War of Independence—a conflict that would lead to Peru’s independence in 1821 and conclude in 1826 with the fall of the San Felipe fortress in Callao.

== History ==
It did not have its own flag nor did it use the Argentine flag. Furthermore, unlike the movement led by Francisco Antonio de Zela, it assumed an autonomist character, that is, it faced the Viceroy, but not the King of Spain. This is partly because when Zela rose, the Junta of Buenos Aires decided not to break with Spain yet (due to the Ferdinand VII strategy), based on the legal theory outlined by Mariano Moreno and followed by Juan José Castelli.

Castelli had sent emissaries and agents to Arequipa and Tacna communicating the news of his advance to the independentists of both cities in the hope of receiving their support while General Manuel Belgrano sent the chief Ramón Copaja to establish communications with Francisco Antonio de Zela, a criollo from Lima, to start an uprising. The plan was that while the main royalist forces fought Castelli's advance, Zela would raise the southern region of Peru, leaving them isolated and without support. He, together with the tacneño José Gómez, the priest Juan José de la Fuente and the chief Toribio Ara organised a small troop that deposed the local royalist subdelegate without shedding blood. It was then that Zela declared his adherence to the government of Buenos Aires and his desire for Peru's independence. The objective was clear, to contribute to the consolidation of the government of the United Provinces of the Río de la Plata to confront in better conditions the Royal Army of Peru based in Lima under the command of Viceroy Abascal.

The programme and the edicts published by Zela excluded from its political and social objectives the demands and interests of the indigenous and black sectors of the city. Thus, it can be said that the rebellion was based on a small sector of local criollo merchants and landowners linked to the mule industry with Upper Peru (Zela, Siles, Argandoña, Herrera, etc.) who led the movement, but who needed mestizo allies: merchants and muleteers, like the Ara family, many of these merchants having family ties with each other. A minority indigenous peasant or community sector was camped on the Caramolle pampa only on the fourth day of the uprising. These objectives were based on Mariano Moreno's republican political programme of 1810 and the agreements of the constituent assembly in the following years. This plan contained the legal principle of the retroversion of sovereignty to the people due to the absence of the king.

But on June 20, Castelli was defeated by José Manuel de Goyeneche in the battle of Guaqui, forcing him to retreat, which meant the condemnation of the republican movement since he was thus isolated. While Zela, on the same day and unaware of what happened, attacked with his men the two military barracks of Tacna, proclaiming himself military commander of the square and Rabino Gabino Barrios, colonel of infantry militias, and curaca Toribio Ara, commander of the cavalry division. Four days later, they had more than 1,000 men from Tarata, Sama, Ylabaya and Locumba.

But on the 25th of the same month, news of the royalist victory in Guaqui reached Tacna, which caused great confusion among the rebels. The royalists took advantage of the situation to disrupt the movement and arrest Zela, who was taken to Lima where he was sentenced to life imprisonment in the prison at Chagres, Panama, where he died on July 18, 1819, at 50 years of age.

The uprisings demonstrated that they were only instigated by the Junta of Buenos Aires in order to facilitate its military campaigns in Upper Peru, while the attitude assumed by the main merchants of the square was, initially, one of prudent indifference, and then they joined the triumphant royalist restoration, without there being any greater initiative among the population.

== See also ==
- Peruvian War of Independence

== Bibliography ==
- Cúneo-Vidal, Rómulo (1921). Historia de las insurrecciones de Tacna por la independencia del Perú. Lima: Librería e Imprenta Gil.
- Vicuña Mackenna, Benjamín (1860). La revolución de la independencia del Perú desde 1809 a 1819 (in Spanish). Lima: Imprenta del Comercio de J. M. Monterola.
- Moreno, Mariano (2007). Plan de operaciones. Buenos Aires: Biblioteca Nacional.
