= Canal Uchusuma =

Chilean canal

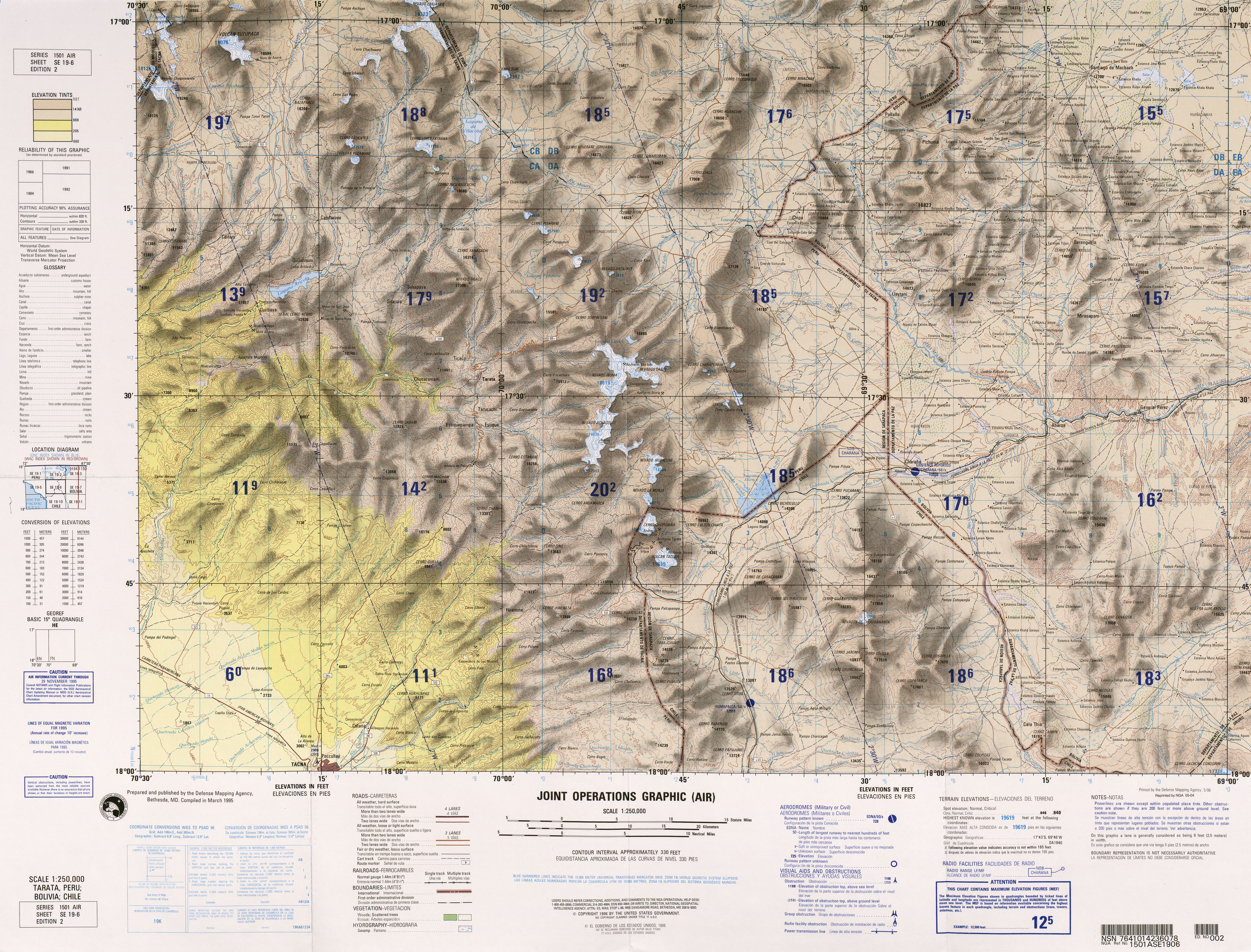
- Map of the general region, with the canal shown in the centre
- Country: Peru, Chile

Geography
- Direction: Southwest
- Start point: Uchusuma River
- End point: Rio Yungane
- Beginning coordinates: 17°34′00″S 69°43′48″W
- Ending coordinates: 17°46′04″S 69°50′33″W

Canal Uchusuma is a canal in Chile.

== Geography ==
The canal begins at the northeastern foot of Cerro Huancune on the Uchusuma River, a principal tributary of the Mauri River; the diversion occurs at the locality Ancochaullanta at 4,460 metres (14,630 ft) elevation. The path of the canal takes it southeastward through Peruvian territory until the Peru-Chile border at Laguna Blanca. It continues through Chilean territory from Laguna Blanca along the Arica–La Paz railway southwestward between the mountains Tacora and Caracarani, close to the Canal Mauri. It turns around Tacora's southern flank to its western side while following a low-altitude moraine, crosses the Rio Azufre westward and then the border between Chile and Peru. In Peru it continues southwestward and ends between the mountains of Cerro Huaylillas and Cerro Chulluncane into the Rio Yungane. It does so by crossing the mountains through the Huaylillas Norte tunnel. The Rio Yungane subsequently joins the Quebrada Vilavilani. The Quebrada Vilavilani descends the Andes in southwestward direction, where it has several different names, and ends close to the city of Tacna into the Caplina River.

== History ==
This canal was constructed in 1820. There were numerous projects to expand the canal system to more water sources in the Mauri, and the Canal Mauri was constructed in 1954. According to a report in 1977, the Canal Uchusuma is still used when the other canal is under maintenance.
