= Iñuma =

Mountain in Peru

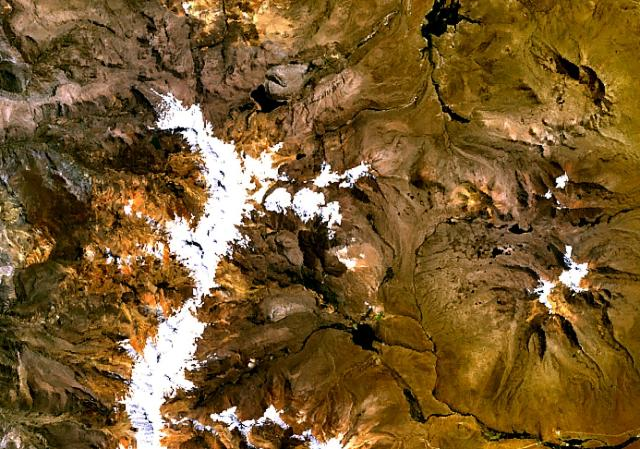
- Barroso mountain range (on the left) as seen from space (NASA Landsat). Iñuma is visible in the upper part of the range.

Highest point
- Elevation: 5,675 m (18,619 ft)
- Coordinates: 17°27′38″S 69°50′18″W

Geography
- Location within Peru
- Location: Peru, Tacna Region
- Parent range: Andes, Barroso

Iñuma (Aymara, Hispanicized spelling Inuma) is a mountain in the Barroso mountain range in the Andes of Peru, about 5,675 metres (18,619 ft) high. It is situated in the Tacna Region, Tacna Province, Palca District, and in the Tarata Province, Tarata District. Iñuma lies northeast of Coruña, north of Awki Taypi and northwest of the Casiri massif.

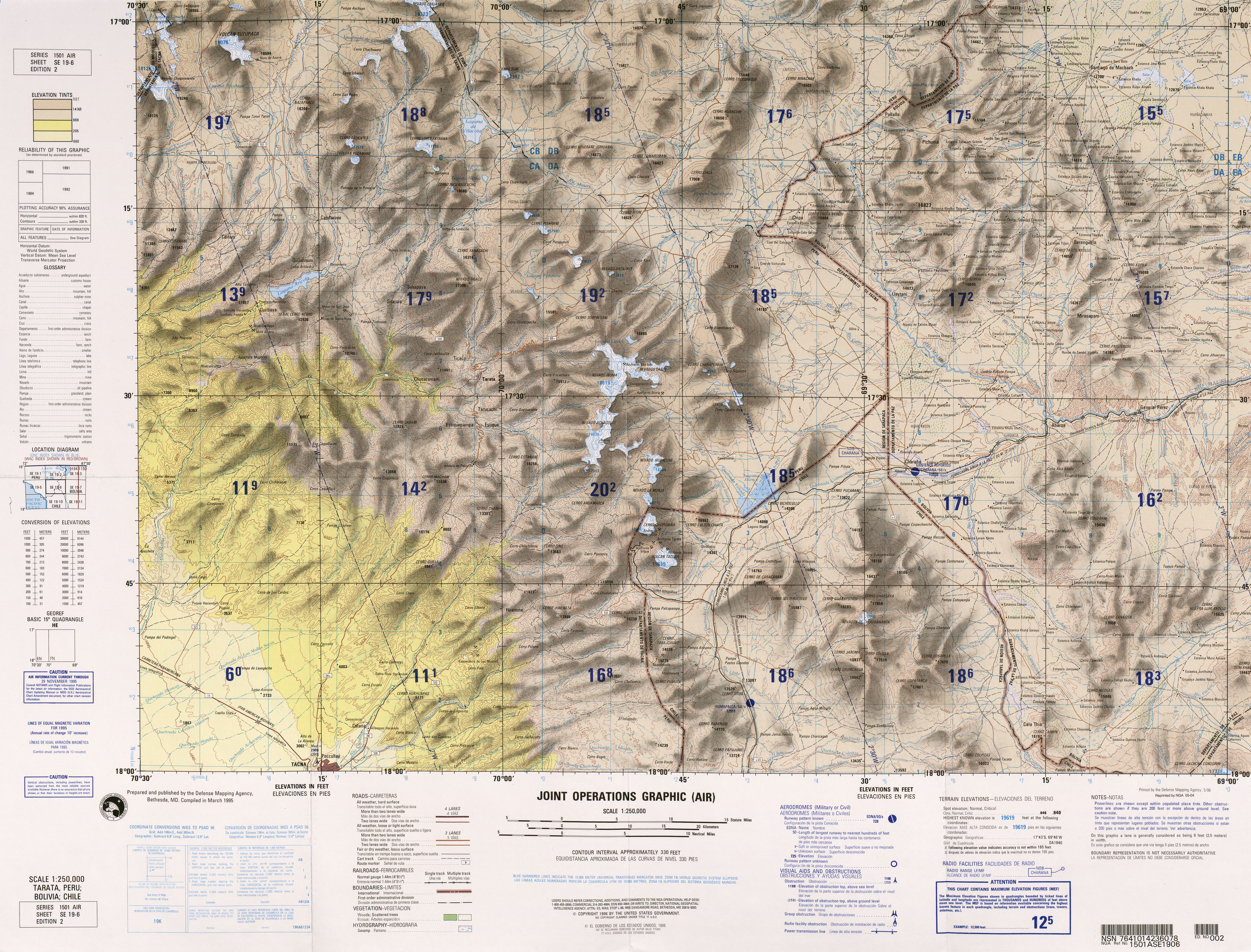
Map of the area showing the location of Iñuma

== See also ==
- Achacollo
- Huancune
