= Canal Mauri =

Canal in Peru and Chile

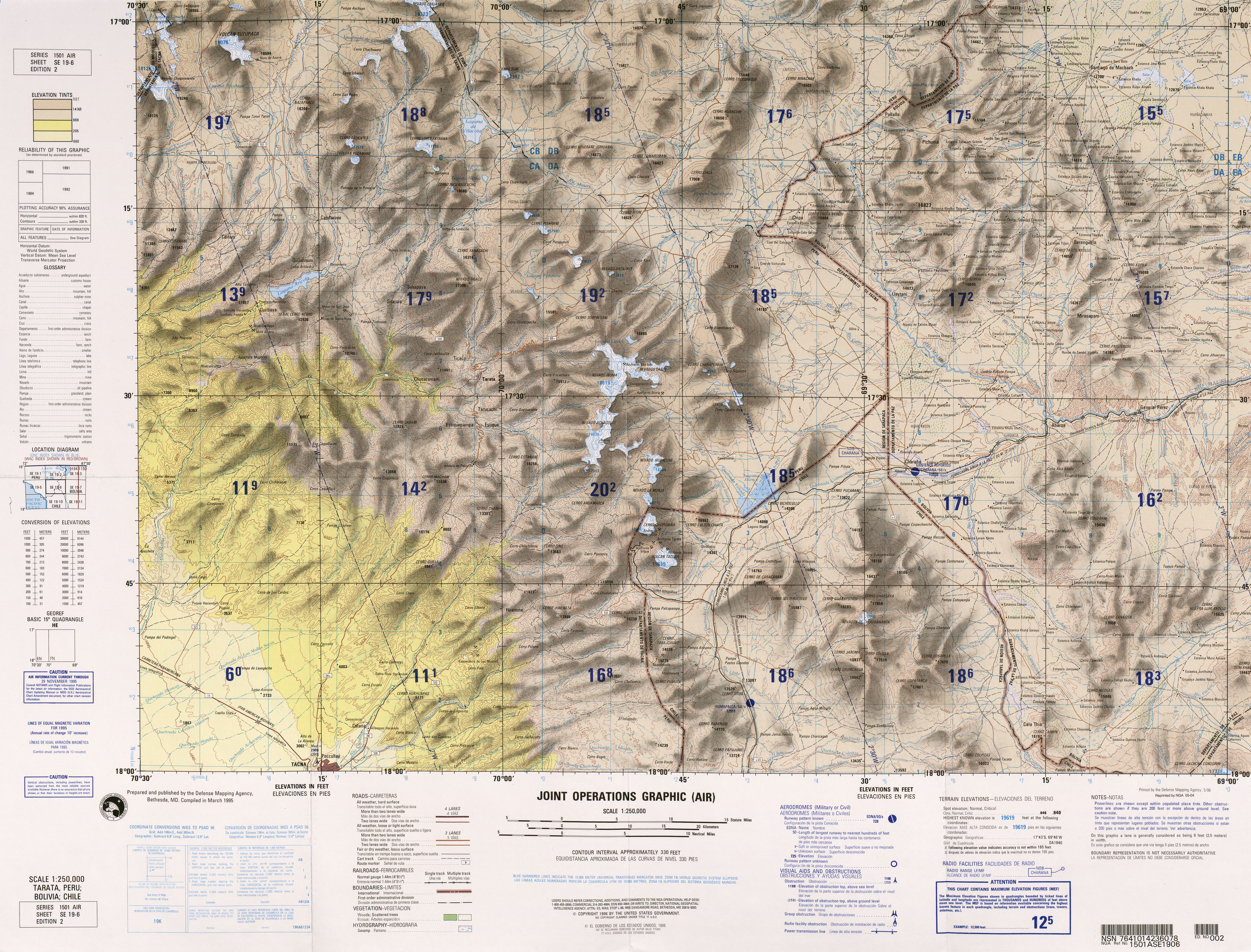
- Map of the general region, with the canal shown in the centre
- Interactive map of Canal Mauri
- Country: Peru, Chile

Specifications
- Length: 47.5 km (29.5 miles)

Geography
- Direction: Southwest
- Start point: Uchusuma River
- End point: Quebrada Vilavilani
- Beginning coordinates: 17°34′33″S 69°38′10″W
- Ending coordinates: 17°48′40″S 69°49′16″W

Canal Mauri is a canal in Peru and Chile. It transfers water from the Mauri River watershed and transfers it into the Caplina River for irrigation purposes. An earlier canal Canal Uchusuma was constructed in the early 19th century and was replaced by the Canal Mauri. This canal collects water from several tributaries of the Mauri River (notably the Uchusuma River) and diverts it through Chilean territory into the Quebrada Vilavilani, a tributary of the Caplina River; from there it is later diverted for irrigation purposes in the Tacna region.

The diversion has damaged wetlands in the region and consequently the expansion project "Vilavilani II" - which would take additional water directly from the Mauri River - has engendered opposition.

== Name ==
The canal is known in Peruvian sources as Canal Uchusuma, but also as Azucarero, Alto Uchusuma or Canal Uchusuma Alto. Canal Uchusuma is also the name of a canal near Tacna, which starts on the Quebrada Vilavilani at Chuschuco; this canal is also known as Canal Uchusuma Bajo. The Patapujo Canal is for parts of its path also known as Chuapalca-Uchusuma.

== Hydrology ==
According to measurements taken in the years 1936–1956, the amount of water transferred was about 13,581,269 cubic metres per year (0.430 m^{3}/s) through both the Canal Mauri and Canal Uchusuma; further measurements in 1952-1972 indicated a yield of 27,800,000 cubic metres per year (0.880 m^{3}/s). A publication in 2012 estimated a yield of 42,000,000 cubic metres per year (1.34 m^{3}/s).

The amount of water withdrawn from the Uchusuma River is large enough that the river only reaches the Mauri during wet periods when the capacity of the diversion is exceeded. This has also resulted in damage to the wetlands that are located along the Uchusuma, as well as complaints by the Bolivian government.

== Path ==
Canal Mauri is a transbasin diversion that transports water from the Lake Titicaca watershed to the Pacific slope. The construction of the canals was facilitated by the gentle terrain of the Mauri River valley. Other infrastructure associated with the Canal Mauri are the reservoirs Paucarani (8,500,000 cubic metres (6,900 acre⋅ft)) and Condorpico (800,000 cubic metres (650 acre⋅ft)); they store water for Tacna and the valley and regulate water flows in the Uchusuma River. Laguna Casiri is an additional reservoir in the system.

A series of diversion dams on the Quebrada Casillaco, Quebrada Chungará, Quebrada Iñuma of the Kallapuma River basin (a tributary of the Mauri) are the source of the 44.5 kilometres (27.7 mi) long Patapujo II canal, whose final part has a construction aimed to dissipate water energy. This canal in turn becomes the 5 kilometres (3.1 mi) Patapujo I canal, which also receives water from groundwater sources. These canals have capacities of 0.8 cubic metres per second (28 cu ft/s), they collect water from tributaries of the Mauri River to transfer it to the Uchusuma. In 2016 another canal named Calachaca was put into service for the same purpose, since the Patapujo canal was leaky. Another diversion on the Quebrada Queñuta collects its water separately in the Canal Queñuta and diverts it to the Uchusuma River.

The canal proper starts at a diversion dam on the Uchusuma River and runs for 47.5 kilometres (29.5 mi) (25 kilometres (16 mi) of it through Chilean territory) in a rectangular canal. The Patapujo I canal joins it soon afterwards, and there are two gauging stations there. The path of the canal takes it through Chilean territory from Laguna Blanca along the Arica–La Paz railway southwestward between the mountains Tacora and Caracarani, close to the Canal Uchusuma. It turns around Tacora, crosses the Rio Azufre and ends close to the Peru-Chile border between the mountains Cerro Huaylillas and Cerro Tabajchuno (Paso Huaylillas Sur) into the Quebrada Vilavilani. It crosses the Cordillera Barroso through the 2.2 kilometres (1.4 mi) long Huaylillas Sur tunnel, the water then enters the Quebrada Vilavilani proper. The Canal Mauri has a capacity of 2 cubic metres per second (71 cu ft/s).

The Quebrada Vilavilani descends the Andes in southwestward direction, where it has several different names, and ends close to the city of Tacna into the Caplina River. There is a diversion on the Quebrada Vilavilani before it reaches the Caplina at Chuschuco, which gives rise to another canal also known as Canal Uchusuma. The water is taken from the Caplina at the Piedras Blancas and Calientes water intakes.

== History ==
Already during Spanish colonial time plans were developed to use the waters of the Uchusuma for irrigation. After Chile had occupied what is now its northern territory and Peru's Tacna Department during the War of the Pacific, it examined the possibility of transferring water from the Mauri River into Tacna to enable irrigated agriculture. Construction of the canal finally began in 1921, over the objection of Bolivia which was concerned about navigation on the Desaguadero River (where the Mauri ends into) being impeded by the loss of water and water supply issues; Bolivia however succeeded insofar as the Mauri River itself was not diverted. In 1929, the Treaty of Lima transferred the canal and Tacna back to Peru, which thus became the owner of the system; further the treaty established that Peru had a right to maintain the parts of the canal that still laid in Chile.

An early proposal by the engineer Jorge Vargas Salcedo envisaged transferring 5.8 cubic metres per second (200 cu ft/s) of water 65 kilometres (40 mi) from the Mauri to the Laguna Blanca northwest of General Lagos on the present-day Peru-Chile border. Laguna Blanca would operate as a reservoir and receive additional waters through 45 kilometres (28 mi) and 27 kilometres (17 mi) long canals from the Uchusuma and Putani rivers, respectively. The plan projected that about 14,000 hectares (35,000 acres) of land could be irrigated at a capital cost of US$4,443,020; the revenue from the irrigated land would be sufficient to offset the investment.

The Canal Uchusuma already existed since 1820; it intercepted water from the Uchusuma River. The Canal Mauri replaces the Uchusuma canal, but according to a report in 1977, the Canal Uchusuma is still used when the other canal is under maintenance. Groundwater wells were added to the system in 1970 and 1995. The Canal Patapujo became operative in 1992. In 2001 the canal Canal Mauri was modified to reduce seepage losses. Plans to expand the diversion system to the Mauri River itself hit opposition by Bolivia in 2009 and 2010.

In 1977 it was suggested that creating a reservoir in the Uchusuma River would increase the availability of water for the system, since the capacity of the Uchusuma diversion is limited and excess water flows past the diversion. The Electric Power Development Company as a consequence of a contract with the Peruvian government concluded in 1960 devised a plan to extend that canal to the Mauri by pumping water from a reservoir that was to be built on the Mauri, close to the border with Bolivia. The plan was shelved owing to the lack of information on the area and the opposition of the Bolivian government (the reservoir would have extended into Bolivian territory).

== Current status ==
The Canal Mauri is currently a major source of water for the Tacna valley, and most of its water is used for irrigation. The regional aquifer is also recharged from the groundwater. Further plans published in 2015 envisaged the transfer of water directly from the Mauri River (at Villachaullani) to the Calachaca canal and from the Ojos de Copapujo springs by 2017 and from the Chiliculco River by 2019; this concept is known as "Vilavilani II".

Hydrological analysis of this concept (along with two planned reservoirs at Chuapalca and Chilicollpa) suggest that the Mauri River would lose about 50% of its flow through such diversions and even more during drought periods. Additional wetlands would be impacted. This has resulted in opposition by inhabitants of affected areas and by the Puno Region. Such water disputes about reservoirs and river diversions have become common in Peru.

Minsur's Pucamarca gold mine lies close to the canal, raising concerns about water in the canal becoming polluted and causing an interstate dispute in 2007. The mine with reserves estimated to be 555,000 ounces gold as of 2015 is 0.5 kilometres (0.31 mi) from the canal. Minsur as a compromise undertook a project to cover part of the canal to resolve issues. The first part of this project was completed in 2014 and covered about 840 metres (2,760 ft) of the canal.
