= Wila Qullu (Palca) =

Mountain in Peru

- Location within Peru

Highest point
- Elevation: 4,600 m (15,100 ft)
- Coordinates: 17°39′36″S 69°52′25″W

Geography
- Location: Peru, Tacna Region, Tacna Province, Palca District
- Parent range: Andes

Wila Qullu (Aymara wila blood, blood-red, qullu mountain, "red mountain", also spelled Huilacollo) is a mountain south of the Barroso mountain range in the Andes of Peru which reaches a height of approximately 4,600 m (15,100 ft). It is located in the Tacna Region, Tacna Province, Palca District. Wila Qullu lies west of Chupikiña.
