= Palca District, Tacna =

Coordinates: 17.7780°S 69.9597°W

Palca P'allqa
- District
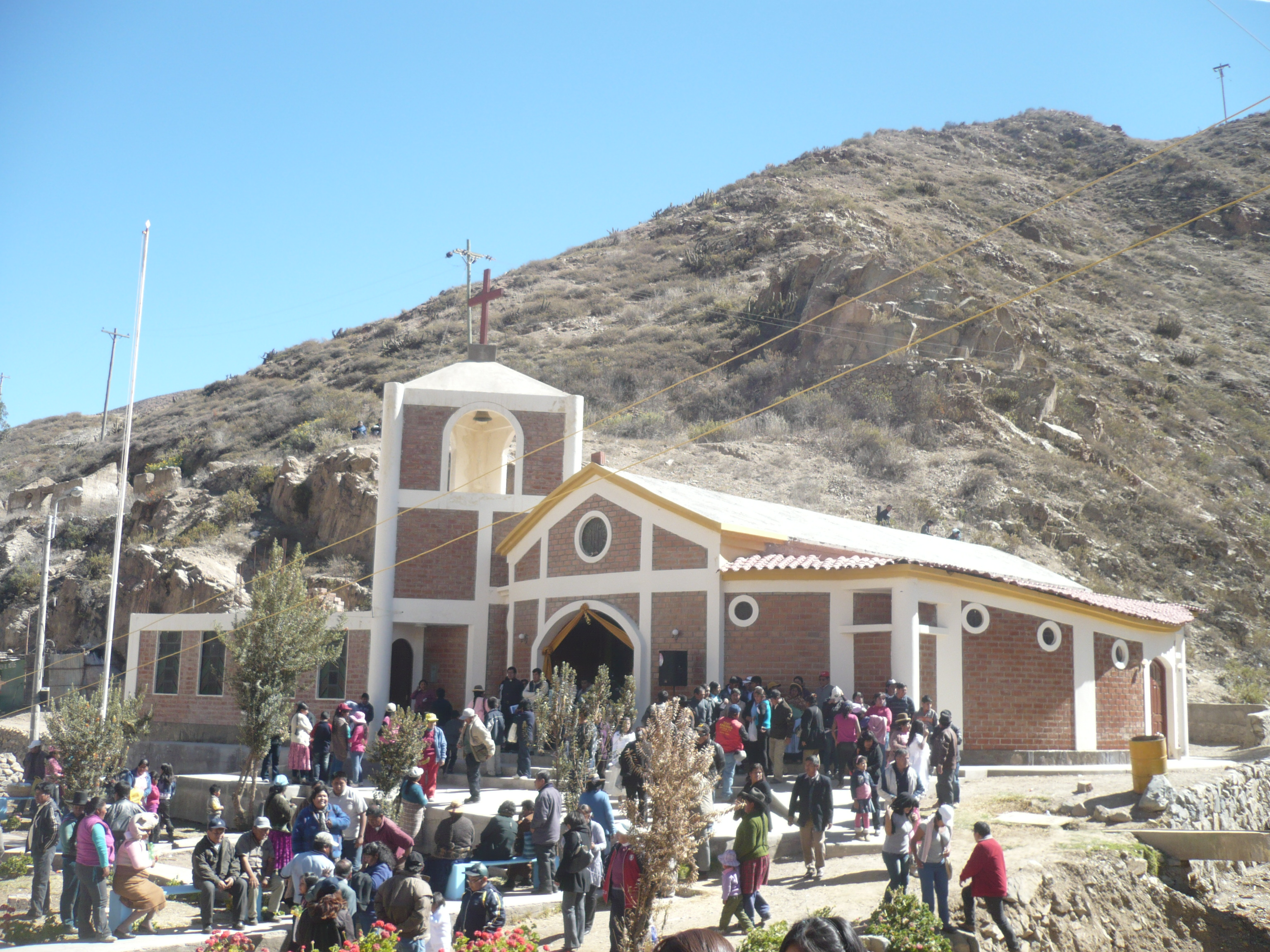
- Church of Causuri near the village of Palca

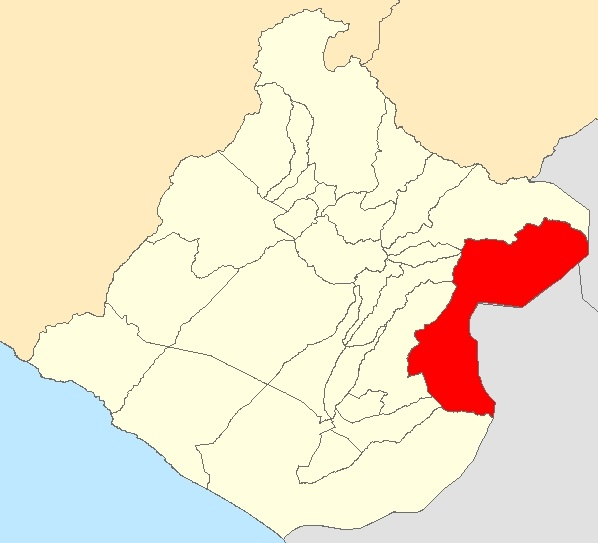
- Location of Palca in the Tacna province
- Country: Peru
- Region: Tacna
- Province: Tacna
- Founded: June 8, 1959
- Capital: Palca

Government
  - Mayor: Hector Mamani Canaviri

Area
  - Total: 1,417.86 km^{2} (547.44 sq mi)
- Elevation: 2,935 m (9,629 ft)

Population (2005 census)
  - Total: 1,106
  - Density: 0.7800/km^{2} (2.020/sq mi)
- Time zone: UTC-5 (PET)
- UBIGEO: 230107

Palca District is one of ten districts of the province Tacna in Peru.

== Geography ==
The Barroso mountain range traverses the district. Some of the highest mountains of the district are listed below:

- Awki Taypi
- Chachakumani
- Chullunkhäni
- Chunta Qullu
- Chupikiña
- Ch'alluta
- Iñuma
- Jach'a Pata
- Jach'a Qullu
- Janq'u Chawllani
- Janq'u Qalani
- Karpani
- Khuruña
- Kunturini
- Lluqu Qullu
- Piqu
- Pukata
- Pupusani
- Phaq'u Q'awa
- Qiwñani
- Qiwñuta
- Q'uli Q'ulini
- Quri Qurini
- Q'asiri
- Wanq'uni
- Wanuni
- Waña Q'awa
- Warawarani
- Wayna Pawqarani
- Wila Wilani
- Wila Qullu
- Wila Willk'i
- Wiqu

== Climate ==
Climate data for Palca, elevation 3,023 m (9,918 ft), (1991–2020)
Month	Jan	Feb	Mar	Apr	May	Jun	Jul	Aug	Sep	Oct	Nov	Dec	Year
Mean daily maximum °C (°F)	17.9 (64.2)	17.8 (64.0)	18.4 (65.1)	19.3 (66.7)	19.4 (66.9)	19.7 (67.5)	19.3 (66.7)	19.8 (67.6)	19.8 (67.6)	19.6 (67.3)	19.0 (66.2)	18.3 (64.9)	19.0 (66.2)
Mean daily minimum °C (°F)	8.9 (48.0)	8.9 (48.0)	8.7 (47.7)	7.8 (46.0)	6.8 (44.2)	6.3 (43.3)	5.8 (42.4)	6.6 (43.9)	7.4 (45.3)	8.2 (46.8)	8.2 (46.8)	8.6 (47.5)	7.7 (45.8)
Average precipitation mm (inches)	25.6 (1.01)	30.9 (1.22)	12.7 (0.50)	0.1 (0.00)	0.4 (0.02)	0.1 (0.00)	0.8 (0.03)	0.5 (0.02)	0.3 (0.01)	0.2 (0.01)	0.1 (0.00)	7.2 (0.28)	78.9 (3.1)
Source: National Meteorology and Hydrology Service of Peru

Climate data for Paucarani, Palca, elevation 4,625 m (15,174 ft), (1991–2020)
Month	Jan	Feb	Mar	Apr	May	Jun	Jul	Aug	Sep	Oct	Nov	Dec	Year
Mean daily maximum °C (°F)	13.1 (55.6)	12.9 (55.2)	13.4 (56.1)	13.3 (55.9)	11.7 (53.1)	11.2 (52.2)	10.9 (51.6)	11.9 (53.4)	13.2 (55.8)	14.6 (58.3)	15.4 (59.7)	14.7 (58.5)	13.0 (55.5)
Mean daily minimum °C (°F)	−1.5 (29.3)	−0.9 (30.4)	−2.3 (27.9)	−4.0 (24.8)	−5.8 (21.6)	−6.6 (20.1)	−7.4 (18.7)	−7.8 (18.0)	−6.3 (20.7)	−5.4 (22.3)	−5.0 (23.0)	−3.2 (26.2)	−4.7 (23.6)
Average precipitation mm (inches)	97.0 (3.82)	91.0 (3.58)	58.1 (2.29)	13.7 (0.54)	1.8 (0.07)	3.4 (0.13)	1.2 (0.05)	2.2 (0.09)	1.2 (0.05)	4.9 (0.19)	11.2 (0.44)	40.8 (1.61)	326.5 (12.86)
Source: National Meteorology and Hydrology Service of Peru
