= Cosapilla River =

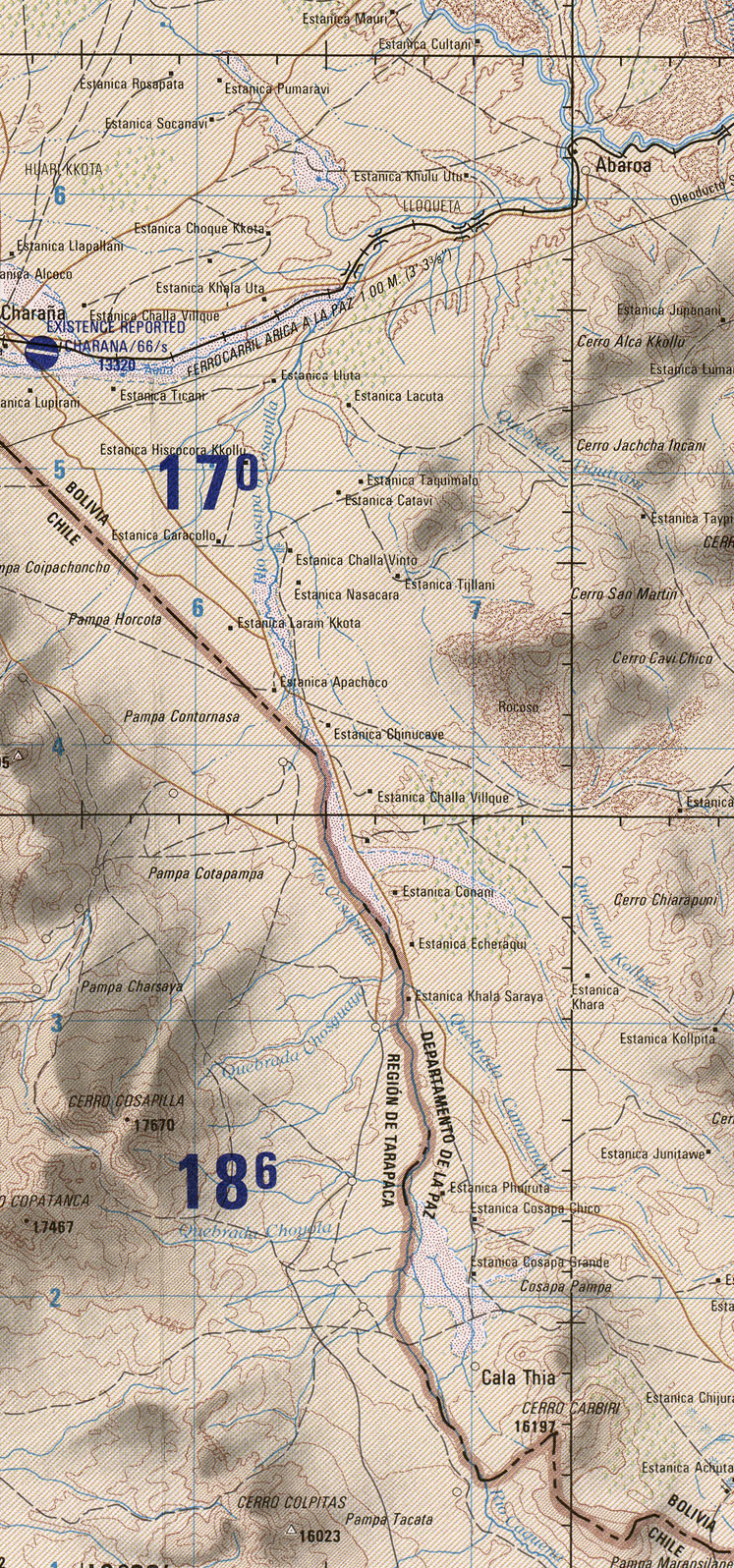
- Cosapilla River, from Chile to Bolivia and also as boundary

Location
- Country: Chile

Physical characteristics
- Mouth: Uchusuma River
  - location: East of Charaña, Bolivia
  - coordinates: 17°34′52″S 69°19′47″W

The Cosapilla River is a river of Chile and Bolivia and is part of the boundary. It is also called Caquena and, in Bolivia, Cosapa (see map). From its source in the Parinacota Province, the river flows north, is part of the Chile-Bolivia boundary and then flows in the Bolivian Department of Oruro.

The Caquena river has its source at the Payachata volcanic group, flows to north, it is part of the Chile-Bolivia boundary, and meets the Cosapilla and takes this name. After about 20 kilometres (12 mi) in Bolivian territory, it empties into the Uchusuma River.

== See also ==
- Bolivia–Chile border
- List of rivers of Chile
