= Wila Willk'i =

Wila Willk'i (Aymara wila blood, blood-red, willk'i gap, "red gap", also spelled Huillahuillque, Vila Vilque, Vilavilque, Wila Villque, Wila Willkhi, Wila Willqui, Wila Wilqui) may refer to:

- Wila Willk'i (Cairoma), a mountain in the Cairoma Municipality, Loayza Province, La Paz Department, Bolivia
- Wila Willk'i (La Paz), a mountain in the Malla Municipality, Loayza Province, La Paz Department, Bolivia
- Wila Willk'i (Oruro), a mountain in the Oruro Department, Bolivia
- Wila Willk'i (Pando), a mountain in the Pando Province, La Paz Department, Bolivia
- Wila Willk'i (Chile and Peru), a mountain in the border between Chile and Peru
