= Queñuta =

Mountain in Peru

- Location within Peru

Highest point
- Elevation: 5,200 m (17,100 ft)
- Coordinates: 17°37′19″S 69°45′13″W

Geography
- Location: Peru, Tacna Region
- Parent range: Andes

Queñuta (possibly from Aymara qiwña a kind of tree (polylepis), uta house, "qiwña house") is a mountain in the Andes of southern Peru, about 5,200 metres (17,060 ft) high. It is located in the Tacna Region, Tacna Province, Palca District, near the Chilean border. The mountain lies southeast of Ancochaullane and Huancune.

Queñuta is also the name of an intermittent stream north of the mountain. It flows to Laguna Blanca in the east along an unpopulated place of that name (Queuñuta).
