= Waña Q'awa (Tacna) =

Mountain in Peru

- Location within Peru

Highest point
- Elevation: 4,000 m (13,000 ft)
- Coordinates: 17°50′19″S 69°53′15″W

Geography
- Location: Peru, Tacna Region, Tacna Province, Palca District
- Parent range: Andes

Waña Q'awa (Aymara waña dry, q'awa little river, ditch, crevice, fissure, gap in the earth, "dry brook" or "dry ravine", also spelled Guañacahua) is a mountain in the Andes of Peru which reaches a height of approximately 4,000 m (13,000 ft). It is located in the Tacna Region, Tacna Province, Palca District. Waña Q'awa lies northeast of the archaeological site of Wila Wilani.
