= Casiri (Tacna) =

Volcano in Peru

- Paucarani, Paugarani
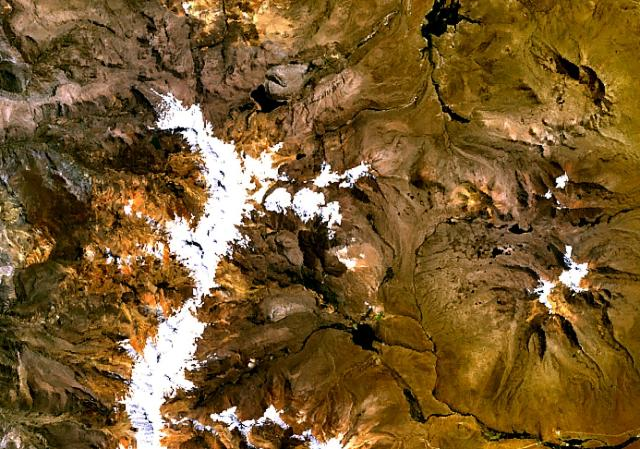

Highest point
- Elevation: 5,650 m (18,540 ft)
- Coordinates: 17°28′S 69°48′W

Geography
- Location within Peru

Casiri, also known as Paucarani, is an about 5,650 metres (18,537 ft) high complex volcano in the Barroso mountain range of the Andes, in the Tacna Region of Peru. It consists of four individual volcanic edifices with lava domes; the southeasternmost edifice has been active during the Holocene, producing thick lava flows that have overrun moraines of Pleistocene age. The youngest lava flow has been dated to 2,600 ± 400 years ago. Although no historical eruptions are known, the volcano is considered to be potentially active and is monitored.

The volcano features geothermal manifestations and is linked to a larger geothermal field that has been prospected for geothermal power generation. There are two sulfur mines on the volcano, and the Paucarani reservoir that contains the bulk of Tacna's water supply is associated with Casiri: The Rio Uchusuma that flows through the reservoir originates on the volcano and the reservoir is located on the foot of Casiri.

== Name and vegetation ==
The name "Casiri" might mean "bawler" in Aymara. Casiri is also known as Paucarani or Paugarani, although Casiri and Paucarani are sometimes treated as distinct volcanoes. A lake with the name "Casiri" lies about 5 kilometres (3.1 mi) north from the volcano; it is a glacial lake and a reservoir which drains into the Mauri River through the Quebrada Chungara and Rio Kallapuma. Polylepis woods occur in the area.

== Geography and geomorphology ==
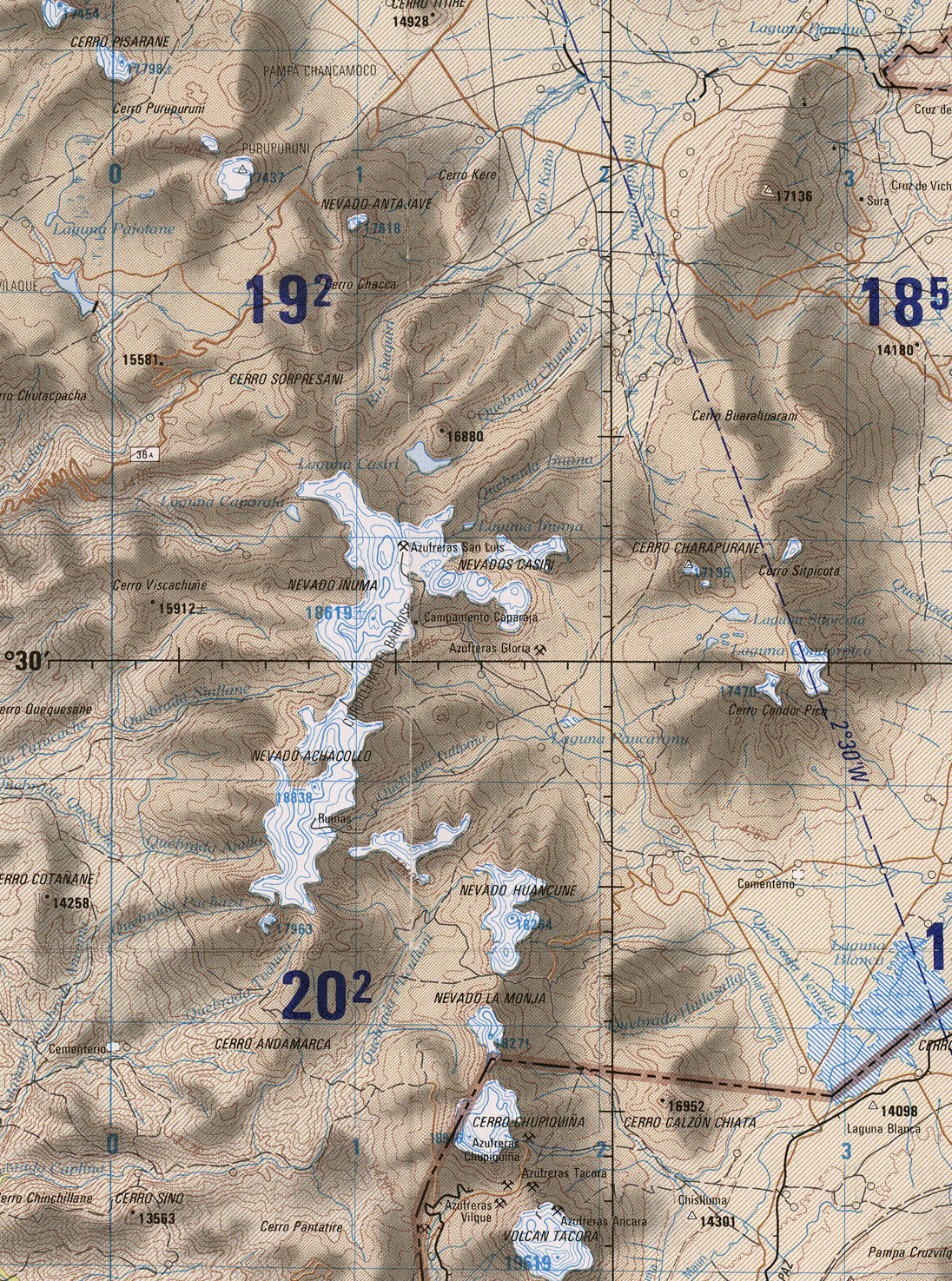

Casiri is a 5,650 metres (18,540 ft) high stratovolcano with lava domes in the Palca district of Peru, close to the border with Chile. There are five or four individual volcanic edifices at Casiri: three older ones that form a 5 kilometre-long chain, and a southeasterly younger edifice with a well preserved lava dome in its crater which is breached to the south. An older lava dome lies in the western part of the complex. The whole Casiri volcano grew on the southern flanks of older volcanoes and rises about 1,050 metres (3,440 ft) above the surrounding terrain. The edifice has a volume of about 7 cubic kilometres (1.7 cu mi), with a diameter of 5 kilometres (3.1 mi). A cirque with a rock glacier is developed on a summit northeast from the main Casiri complex. Close to the Paucarani reservoir is a debris avalanche deposit.

Lava flows, stubby and 50–100 metres (160–330 ft) thick owing to viscosity, originate on the younger edifice and spread in several directions. The flows reach widths of 50–500 metres (160–1,640 ft), lengths of 2 kilometres (1.2 mi) and are well preserved, displaying flow lines, levees and lobes; on images taken from space they have dark colours. Some parts of the volcano underwent hydrothermal alteration, producing gray-white rocks and clay, and wind-blown ash covers part of the lava flows.

Casiri is part of the Cordillera del Barroso mountain range; generally, the terrain around Casiri is dominated by various volcanic and fluvioglacial formations along with some moraines. The mountain chains Barroso and Huancune lie southwest and south from Casiri, respectively, and the neighbouring mountains Auquitapie and Iñuma are covered with snow. Geologically, Casiri is considered to be part of the so-called "Paucarani Volcanics".

=== Hydrology and Paucarani reservoir ===
The Rio Uchusuma, a tributary of the Rio Mauri, originates on Casiri. A natural lake called Paucarani or Paucarini is on the southeastern foot of Casiri, and is an important bird site. The Quebrada Achuco valley is located south of Casiri, accompanied by wetlands. On the other side, the southeastward-flowing Quebrada Mamuta lies to the north and northeast of the volcano, and to the northwest lie streams which flow through the lake Casiri and the lake Liñuma into the Rio Mauri. Volcanic activity has influenced the drainages through the formation of lava dams, altering watersheds.

An earth dam on the Rio Uchusuma was built in 1982-1986 and forms a reservoir also called Paucarani on the southeastern foot of the volcano just southwest from the natural lake Paucarani. This reservoir, which is run by the Junta de Usuarios del Valle de Tacna, has a capacity of 10,500,000 cubic metres (370,000,000 cu ft) of water and is a key part of the water supply of Tacna; water is transferred from the Paucarani reservoir through the Canal Uchusuma to Tacna, covering 90% of Tacna's water consumption for both irrigation and human use.

The Paucarani reservoir is also involved in the regulation of the Rio Caplina. In 2012, a broken floodgate caused a damaging flood. Alterations in the reservoir that increased its storage volume may be responsible for water leaks in the dam; additional problems reported at Paucarani are contamination with heavy metals - especially arsenic.

=== Human geography ===
Casiri is located in the Tarata Province of the Tacna Region of Peru; it lies about 100 kilometres (62 mi) northeast from the city of Tacna and close to the border with Chile and Bolivia. The volcano is situated north of the town of Paucarani; other human structures in the area south of Casiri are Calachata and Tulipiña. There are also numerous roads in the area, including one which runs south of the volcano and reaches the Capaja camp to its west. The town of Paucarani can be reached from the highway that connects Tacna with Charaña in Bolivia and Villa Industrial in Chile, through a secondary road. The region is thinly populated. A rain gauge of the Servicio Nacional de Meteorología e Hidrología del Perú was in use on the volcano at 4,600 metres (15,100 ft) elevation from 1946 to 2003.

The volcano is considered a potential tourist attraction owing to its scenery. It is also part of the Monumento Natural de Paucarani geopark and has been proposed to become a protected area. The Paucarani reservoir also could be exploited for tourism purposes as well.

== Geology ==
The Nazca Plate subducts beneath the South America Plate at a rate of 7–9 centimetres per year (2.8–3.5 in/year) and causes volcanism along the western margin of South America. This volcanism is distributed over three volcanic belts, the Northern Volcanic Zone, the Central Volcanic Zone and the Southern Volcanic Zone. The Central Volcanic Zone includes the volcanoes of southern Peru, a country with over 300 volcanoes. Of these, El Misti, Huaynaputina, Sabancaya, Ticsani, Tutupaca, Ubinas and Yucamane have been active during historical time. There are also geothermal manifestations such as fumaroles, geysers and hot springs in the country. Despite the activity, volcanism in Peru is poorly known.

The regional geology around Casiri features the Pleistocene Barroso volcanic rocks, which overlie older rocks of Jurassic to Cretaceous age. Examples of rock formations are the Capillune, Huilacollo, Sencca and Tarata Formations and the Maure Group, all of Eocene to Pleistocene age. Several fault systems, like the Incapuquio fault, separate the individual rock units.

=== Composition ===
Based on rock types that the Casiri volcano has erupted, it can be determined that it is composed of andesite, basaltic andesite and trachyandesite with a porphyric texture; the rocks contain biotite, hornblende, plagioclase and sanidine crystals. Deposition of sulfur from gases has formed sulfur deposits.

=== Eruption history ===
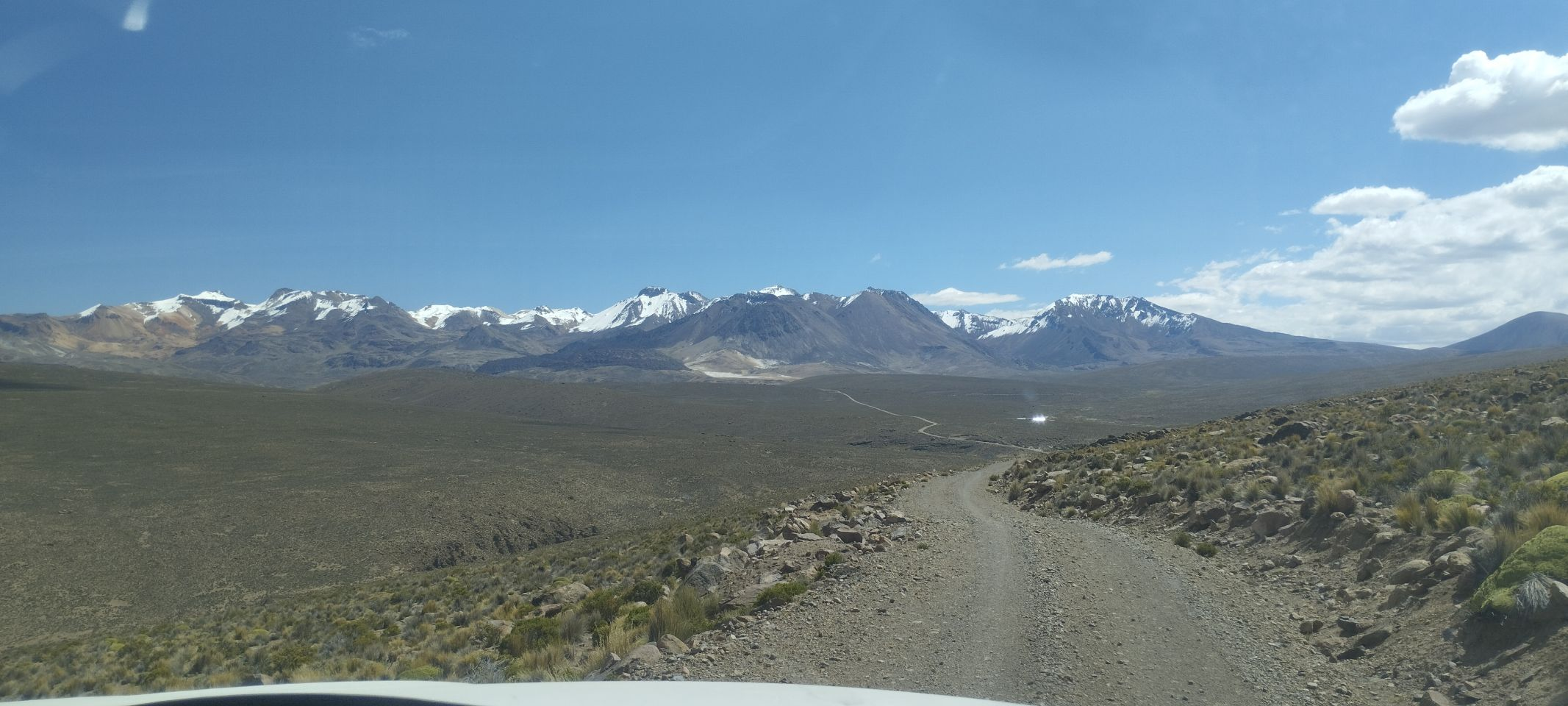
South view of Casiri. The dark rocks are the result of the most recent eruption.

The Quaternary-age Casiri is one of the youngest volcanic systems in southern Peru with postglacial activity, and Peru's southernmost Holocene volcano. Holocene lavas sourced from fissure vents overlie Pleistocene-age moraines and are uneroded; radiometric dating on the volcano has yielded ages of 50,000 years and surface exposure dating has found ages of 6,000 ± 900 and 2,600 ± 400 years for two dark lava flows southwest and south of Casiri's main summit, respectively.

There are no reported eruptions, but activity may or may not have occurred in historical time; there are hot springs and solfataras that are probably powered by Casiri's magmatic system. Casiri has been classified as a latent or potentially active volcano with a moderate threat level. Earthquakes in 2020 and 2021 in the area do not appear to relate to volcanic activity.

In 2012, the Geophysical Institute in Peru announced that it would begin monitoring Casiri, along with two other volcanoes in southern Peru, with seismometers. They consider it a "low hazard" volcano. As of 2021, there are two seismometers and one instrument measuring the deformation of the volcano at Casiri. The installation of a network to detect deformation of the volcano is supposed to begin in 2022.

== Human use ==
The Casiri volcanic complex and surrounding mountains have been prospected for potential geosites.

=== Mining ===
The Gloria sulfur mine lies on Casiri – specifically, on the foot of Paucarani and southeast from the lava flows. The sulfur is contained in heavily altered rocks covering an area of about 1 square kilometre (0.39 sq mi) and is genetically related to the activity of Casiri. It has been excavated through trenches and wells; some installations could still be exploitable. Another mine known as San Luis may also be associated with Paucarani; it is located on the northwestern flank. Precious metals might occur in the hydrothermally altered areas at Casiri.

=== Geothermal power ===
The area of Casiri features the Chungará-Kallapuma geothermal field, where about 50 separate vents occur along the path of the Quebrada Chungará and the Kallapuma River; they reach temperatures of 83.4 °C (182.1 °F). These phenomena appear to relate to the activity of neighbouring volcanoes, which supply the heat to the geothermal field, while rainfall supplies the water and faults the paths for the ascending water; the hot springs are currently used as spas by the local population.

The geothermal power potential of the Tacna Region has been researched, partly because the Tacna Region covers its electricity demand with either nonrenewable oil or with hydropower (which is subject to climate variations). Mining is both an important economic resource in Tacna and a major consumer of electricity. In the case of the Chungará-Kallapuma geothermal field, the capacity of a 75 megawatt power plant exists; however, despite ongoing research since 1974 and a high geothermal potential, no geothermal power production has taken place in Peru as of 2013.
