= Chullunkhäni (disambiguation) =

Chullunkhäni (Aymara chullunkhä icicle, -ni a suffix, "the one with icicles", also spelled Chulluncane, Chulluncani) may refer to:

- Chullunkhäni, a mountain in the Potosí Department, Bolivia
- Chullunkhäni (Chuquisaca), a mountain in the Chuquisaca Department, Bolivia
- Chullunkhäni (La Paz), a mountain in the La Paz Department, Bolivia
- Chullunkhäni (Peru), a mountain in the Tacna Region, Peru
