= Hot springs, Pachia =

Thermal springs in Peru

Hot springs, Pachia is a hot spring in Tacna, Peru. It's located 22.8 km away from Tacna to the east, placed on the shores of the Caplina River, and 1,400m above sea level.

It believed that this hot spring affects people suffering from neuro-arthritic and skin disorders.

The temperatures fluctuate between 36C (96.8F) and 39C (102.2F).

There is a hotel and a restaurant beside the hot spring.

== Access ==
You can go to the hot spring via Pocollay, Calana, and Pachia by local bus.
