= Wila Wilani =

Wila Wilani (Aymara for "the one with a complex of red color", Hispanicized spellings Huila Huilani, Huilahuilane, Vela Velane, Velarelane, Velaveiane, Vila Vilani, Vilavilani, also Wilawilani) may refer to:

- Wila Wilani (Larecaja), a mountain in the Larecaja Province, La Paz Department, Bolivia
- Wila Wilani (Los Andes), a mountain in the Los Andes Province, La Paz Department, Bolivia
- Wila Wilani (Moquegua-Tacna) or Ch'ankha Qullu, a mountain in the Moquegua Region and in the Tacna Region, Peru
- Wila Wilani (Tacna), an archaeological site in the Tacna Province, Tacna Region, Peru
