= Coruña (mountain) =

Mountain in Peru

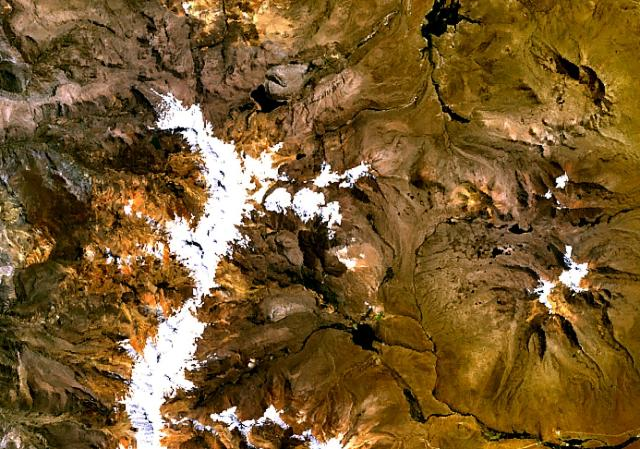
- Barroso mountain range (on the left) as seen from space (NASA Landsat). Coruña is visible in the upper part of the range.

Highest point
- Elevation: 5,453 m (17,890 ft)
- Coordinates: 17°29′15″S 69°51′14″W

Geography
- Location within Peru
- Location: Peru, Tacna Region
- Parent range: Andes, Barroso

Coruña (possibly from Aymara for "to eat greedily") is a mountain in the Barroso mountain range in the Andes of Peru, about 5,453 metres (17,890 ft) high. It is situated in the Tacna Region, Tacna Province, Palca District, and in the Tarata Province, in the districts of Tarata and Tarucachi. Coruña lies southwest of Auquitaipe.

== See also ==
- Achacollo
- Huancune
