= Chontacollo =

Mountain in Peru

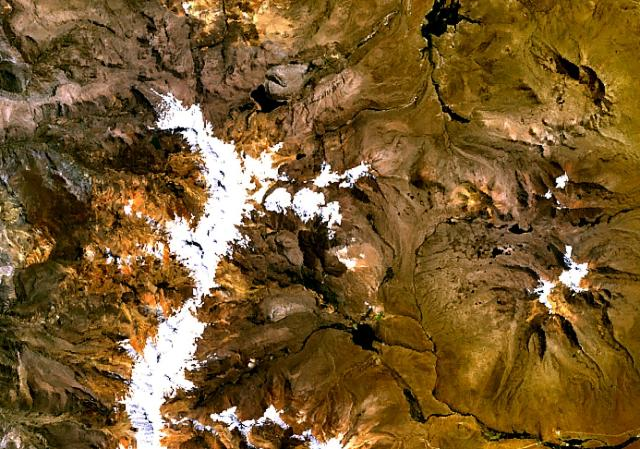
- Barroso mountain range (on the left) as seen from space (NASA Landsat) with Chontacollo in the upper part of the range

Highest point
- Elevation: 5,300 m (17,400 ft)
- Coordinates: 17°26′10″S 69°51′12″W

Geography
- Location within Peru
- Location: Peru, Tacna Region
- Parent range: Andes

Chontacollo (possibly from Aymara chunta prolonged, lengthened, qullu mountain, "prolonged mountain") is a mountain in the north of the Barroso mountain range in the Andes of Peru, about 5,300 metres (17,388 ft) high. It is situated in the Tacna Region, Tarata Province, Tarata District. Chontacollo lies northwest of the mountain Iñuma.
