= Alameda Bolognesi =

Avenue in Tacna

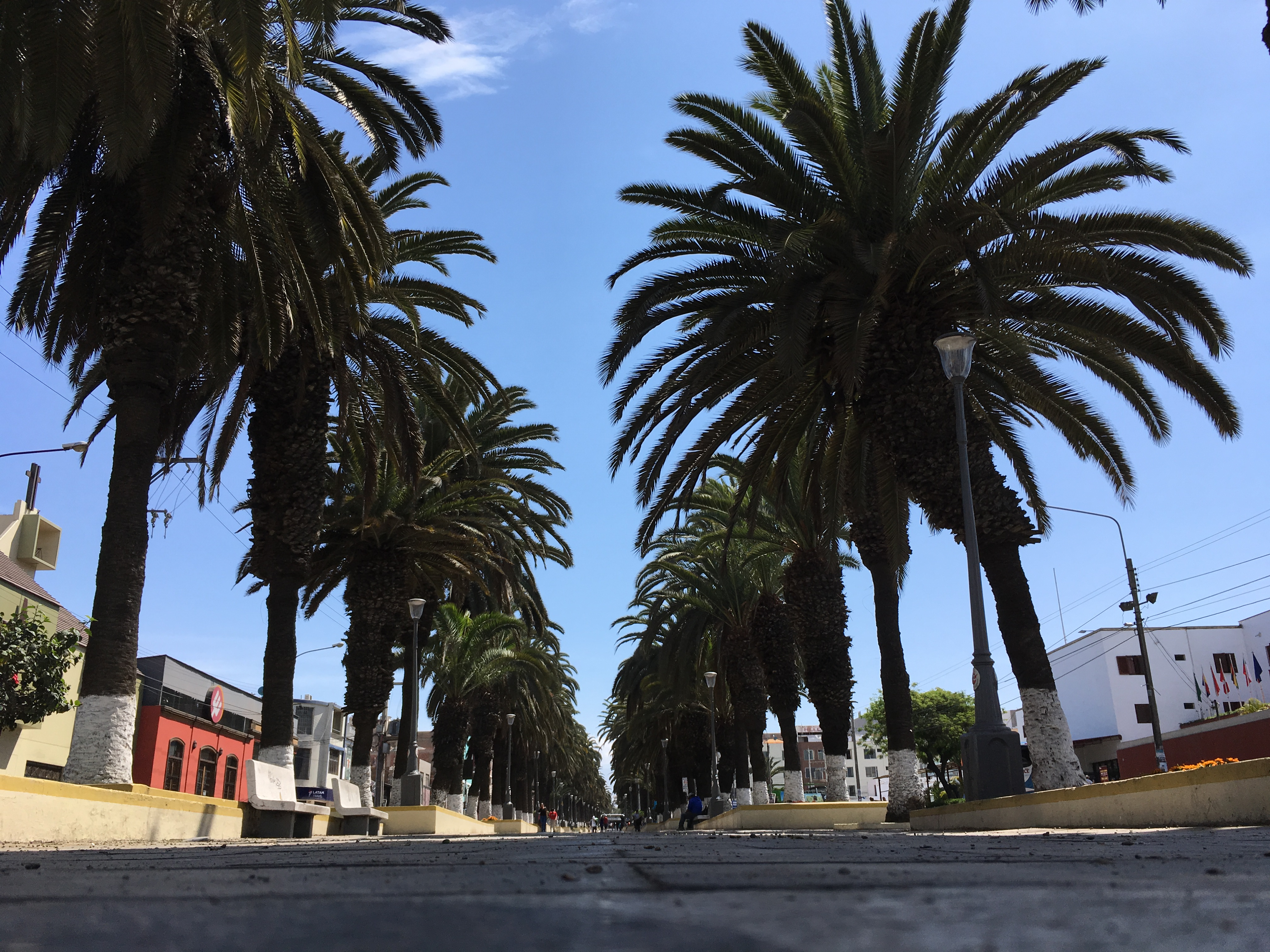
- Namesake: Francisco Bolognesi; Manuel Baquedano (until 1929)
- From: Avenida Celestino Vargas
- To: Avenida Grau

Construction
- Inauguration: 1840

Alameda Bolognesi, formerly known as Alameda Baquedano during the city's Chilean administration, is the main avenue of the city of Tacna, Peru. It was built over the streambed of Caplina River, which still runs under its path. It was built by Manuel de Mendiburu when he was prefect of Tacna in 1840, subsequently modernised by the local government.

== History ==
Formerly the Caplina River ran in the open, on both sides of the river there were acacias and willows; There were also bridges of solid construction, statues that represented the four seasons, stone benches and arbors with a vaulted base with a circular platform and lateral stands. During the Chilean administration in 1880 during the War of the Pacific, those marble statues disappeared, as well as the willows and palm trees were planted. In the Chilean period of Tacna, the mall was called Baquedano Avenue, after General Manuel Baquedano.

In the last years of the 1960s, a large part of the avenue was paved, it was modernized, keeping the first blocks almost as they were originally (Plaza Colón).

It is currently one of the arterial roads of the city of Tacna, where transportation, commerce and tourism is constant and connects directly with the roads to Chile and Bolivia. The population density is high due to the great movement generated by shopping centers, hotels, restaurants, tourism agencies, markets, etc. And because it is central to different and nearby tourist spots in Tacna. It is a regular venue for public events such as the Book Fair, exhibitions, craft fairs and festivals.

== See also ==
- Tacna Historical Museum
- Tacna Locomotive park
