= Ancochaullane =

Mountain in Peru

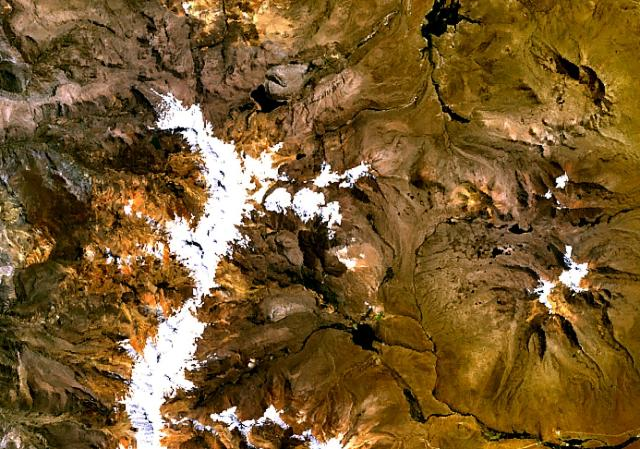
- Barroso mountain range as seen from space (NASA Landsat) with the northern slopes of Ancochaullane shown in the lower center

Highest point
- Elevation: 5,300 m (17,400 ft)
- Coordinates: 17°34′59″S 69°47′24″W

Geography
- Location within Peru
- Location: Peru, Tacna Region
- Parent range: Andes

Ancochaullane (possibly from Aymara janq'u white, chawlla, challwa, fish, -ni a suffix to indicate ownership, "the one with white fish" or "the white one with fish") is a mountain in the Barroso mountain range in the Andes of Peru, about 5,300 metres (17,388 ft) high. It is located in the Tacna Region, Tacna Province, Palca District. Ancochaullane lies north of the mountain Huancune.

Ancochaullane is also the name of a little populated place northeast of the mountain. It lies at 17°34′07″S 69°45′03″W.
