= Tacna Locomotive park =

Park in Tacna, Peru

Coordinates: 18.0163°S 70.2524°W

- Interactive map of Tacna Locomotive park
- Type: Public park
- Location: Tacna, Peru
- Created: 1977
- Operator: Municipality of Tacna

Tacna Locomotive park, (Parque de la Locomotora) is a park, located at the Alameda Bolognesi, in the centre of the city of Tacna, Peru. It features a 19th-century train that carried Francisco Bolognesi and his troops to the defence of the Morro de Arica during the War of the Pacific.

== History ==
This plaza was built to house the centennial Locomotive No. 3 Model 1859, built in Pennsylvania and which led Colonel Francisco Bolognesi and his Peruvian troops to defend the Morro de Arica during the War with Chile. During the Chilean occupation, the locomotive continued linking Tacna with Arica. In 1940 it stopped working and was later repaired and moved to the park in 1977. The park features two statues of Bolognesi and of Alfonso Ugarte.

This park is usually visited by local and foreign residents and tourists. It is usually used at night as a rehearsal centre for various dance groups in the city and as a practice center for skateboarding and roller skating. There are also usually art and recycling fairs and exhibitions in the park commissioned by the Municipality of Tacna.

When the Huaycos disaster occurred in Mirave and the mountain sectors in Tacna in February 2019, the Locomotive Park became one of the collection points for food and help for the victims in charge of the Third Cavalry Brigade of the city.

== See also ==
- Tacna–Arica railway
