= Chupiquiña =

Mountain in Peru

- Location within Arica y Parinacota

Highest point
- Elevation: 5,805 m (19,045 ft)
- Coordinates: 17°39′56″S 69°47′58″W

Geography
- Location: Chile, Arica y Parinacota Region; Peru, Tacna Region
- Parent range: Andes, Barroso

Chupiquiña (possibly from Aymara Chupikiña) is a volcano on the border of Chile and Peru, about 5,805 metres (19,045 ft) high. On the Chilean side it is situated in the Arica y Parinacota Region, Parinacota Province, and on the Peruvian side it lies in the Tacna Region, Tacna Province, Palca District. Chupiquiña lies southeast of Achacollo and south of the Huancune volcano, near the Chilean volcano named Tacora.

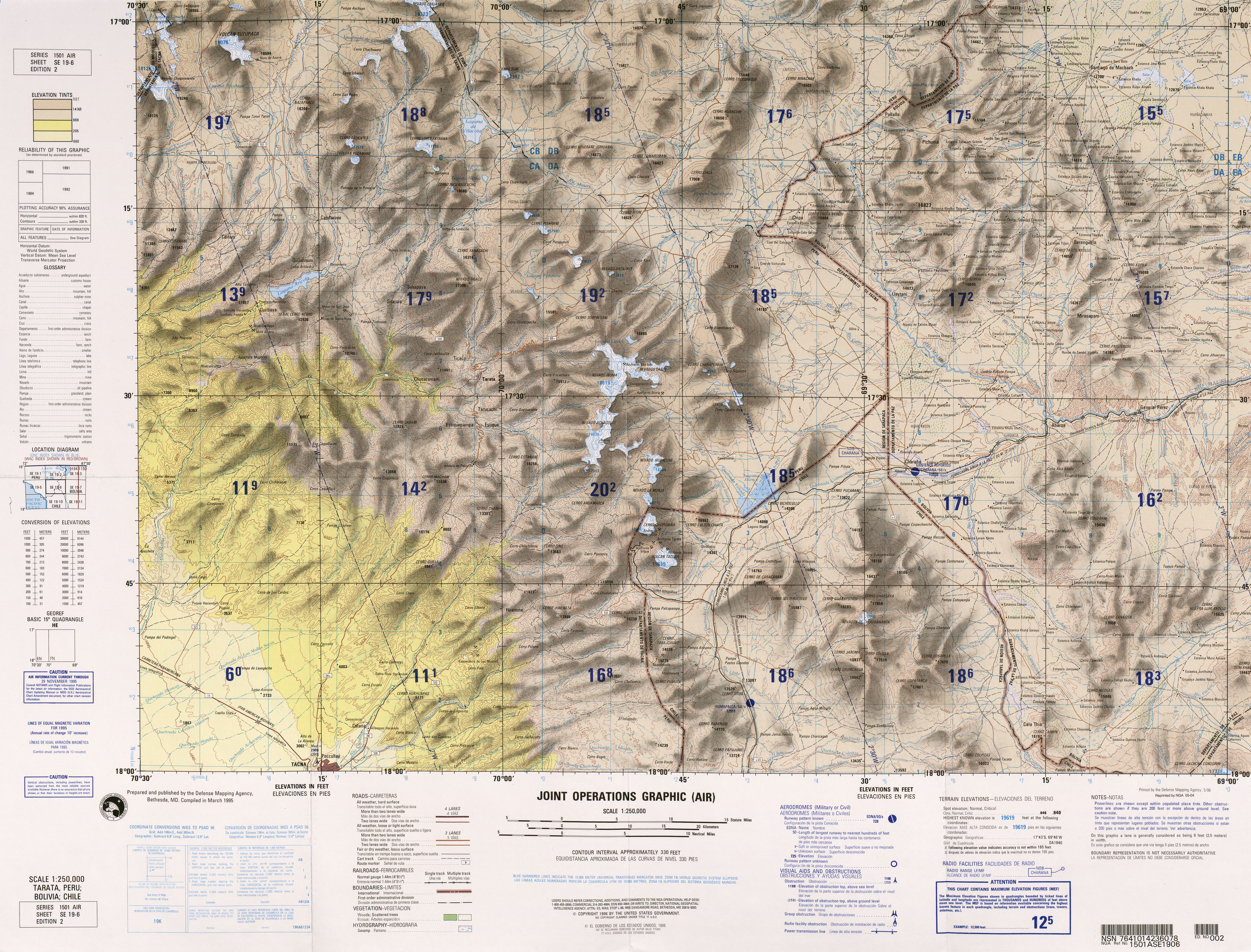
Map of the area showing the location of Chupiquiña
