= Tacna Historical Museum =

Museum in Tacna, Peru

Coordinates: 18.0133°S 70.2492°W

- Museo Histórico Regional de Tacna
- Established: 26 August 1957
- Location: Calle Apurimac N° 202

Tacna Historical Museum (Spanish: Museo Histórico Regional de Tacna) is a museum located in the center of the city of Tacna, Peru. The museum's displays feature documents and objects from the time of Peru's emancipation, independence, and the war with Chile.

The same building, located at Calle Apurimac 202, on the corner with Alameda Bolognesi, houses Tacna's Public Library. The building was designed in the Republican style and built in 1957.
