= Qiwñani =

Mountain in Peru

- Location within Peru

Highest point
- Elevation: 4,200 m (13,800 ft)
- Coordinates: 17°33′40″S 69°35′00″W

Geography
- Location: Peru, Tacna Region
- Parent range: Andes

Qiwñani (Aymara qiwña a kind of tree (polylepis), -ni a suffix, "the one with the qiwña", hispanicized spelling Queuñane) is a mountain in the Andes of southern Peru, about 4,200 metres (13,780 ft) high. It is located in the Tacna Region, Tacna Province, Palca District, near the Chilean border. Qiwñani lies north of Phaq'u Q'awa.
