= Vilavilque (Chile and Peru) =

- Location within Arica y Parinacota

Highest point
- Elevation: 5,000 m (16,000 ft)
- Coordinates: 17°38′43″S 69°44′11″W

Geography
- Location: Chile, Arica y Parinacota Region; Peru, Tacna Region
- Parent range: Andes

Vilavilque (possibly from Aymara wila blood, blood-red, willk'i gap, "red gap") is a mountain in the Andes, about 5,000 metres (16,404 ft) high. On the Chilean side it is situated in the Arica y Parinacota Region, Parinacota Province, and on the Peruvian side it lies in the Tacna Region, Tacna Province, Palca District. Vilavilque lies southeast of Queñuta.
