= Auquitaipe =

Mountain in Peru

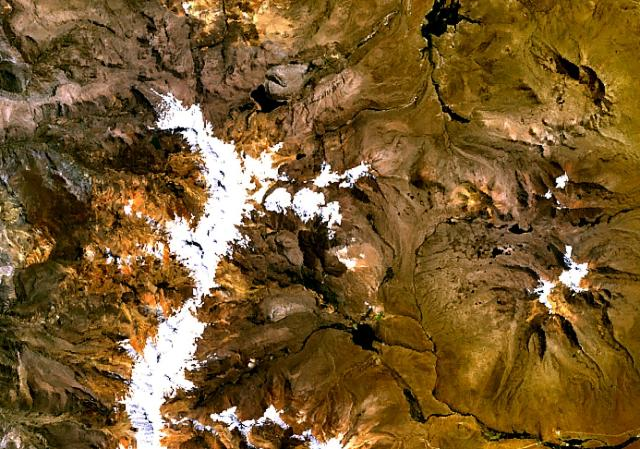
- Barroso mountain range (on the left) as seen from space (NASA Landsat). Auquitaipe is visible in the upper part of the range.

Highest point
- Elevation: 5,600 m (18,400 ft)
- Coordinates: 17°28′58″S 69°50′32″W

Geography
- Location within Peru
- Location: Peru, Tacna Region
- Parent range: Andes, Barroso

Auquitaipe (possibly from Aymara awki father; gentleman, taypi center, middle) is a mountain in the Barroso mountain range in the Andes of Peru, about 5,600 m (18,400 ft) high. It is located in the Tacna Region, Tacna Province, Palca District, and in the Tarata Province, Tarata District. It lies northeast of Coruña.
