= Tacora =

Stratovolcano in Parinacota Province, Chile

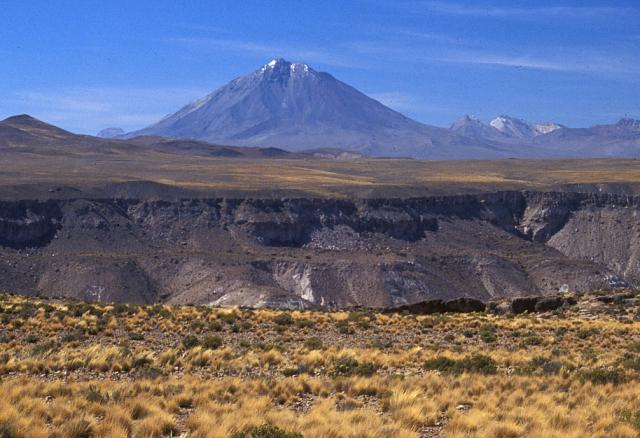
- Tacora in 2004

Highest point
- Elevation: 5,980 m (19,620 ft)
- Prominence: 1,721 m (5,646 ft)
- Parent peak: Nevado Sajama
- Listing: Ultra
- Coordinates: 17°43′14″S 69°46′22″W

Geography
- Location within Chile
- Location: Chile
- Parent range: Andes

Geology
- Mountain type: Stratovolcano
- Volcanic zone: Central Volcanic Zone
- Last eruption: Unknown

Tacora is a stratovolcano located in the Andes of the Arica y Parinacota Region of Chile. Near the border with Peru, it is one of the northernmost volcanoes of Chile. It is part of the Central Volcanic Zone in Chile, one of the four volcanic belts of the Andes. The Central Volcanic Zone has several of the highest volcanoes in the world. Tacora itself is a stratovolcano with a caldera and a crater. The youngest radiometric age is 50,000 years ago and it is heavily eroded by glacial activity.

Volcanism in the Central Volcanic Zone results from the subduction of the Nazca Plate beneath the South America Plate. Tacora is constructed on the so-called "Arica Altiplano" and is part of a north–south alignment of volcanoes. Tacora itself has uncertain reports of historical eruptions and there are active fumaroles.

The fumarolic activity has resulted in the emplacement of substantial deposits of sulfur, which were already mentioned centuries ago. Towards the latter 19th century, systematic mining of the sulfur deposits of Tacora occurred and substantial mining infrastructure was constructed on the mountain.

== Etymology ==
The origin of the toponym Tacora, according to what was stated in 1899 by the lawyer and diplomat Astaburuaga Cienfuegos, comes from the term tacuri, of Quechua origin, meaning restlessness or commotion. However, more recently, the scholar Mamani has argued that Tacora derives from the term taqura, of Aymara origin, referring to a loom instrument and a type of totora reed.

== Geography and geomorphology ==
Tacora lies in the Arica y Parinacota Region of Chile, about 100 kilometres (62 mi) northeast of Arica. It is among the northernmost volcanoes of Chile and poorly known.

Tacora is part of the Central Volcanic Zone, one out of several volcanic belts of the Andes. The Central Volcanic Zone is one of the world's major volcanic provinces and features both a high density of volcanoes and some of the tallest volcanic edifices in the world. Volcanoes in the Central Volcanic Zone include Sabancaya, El Misti and Ubinas in Peru and Tacora, Isluga, Irruputuncu, Ollague, San Pedro, Putana, Alitar, Lascar and Lastarria in Chile, Bolivia and Argentina; there are about 34 volcanoes in the Chilean portion of the Central Volcanic Zone alone. Of these Lascar is considered to be the most active, with a large eruption in 1993. Aside from volcanoes, the Central Volcanic Zone also features geothermal fields such as El Tatio.

The volcano is a 5,980 metres (19,620 ft) high cone with a summit caldera that opens northwest and a 500-metre (1,600 ft) wide crater below the summit within the caldera scarp. Steep lava flows form the bulk of the edifice, along with lava domes and pyroclastic material, and rise about 1.7 kilometres (1.1 mi) above the surrounding terrain. The edifice is heavily eroded with about 32 metres (105 ft) of rocks gone but still has a circular shape. There are traces of a sector collapse scar and of the resulting debris avalanche on the southeastern flank.

According to some reports glaciers occur within the caldera at elevations above 5,500 metres (18,000 ft), while other reports indicate the absence of perennial snow on the mountain. Glacial valleys and moraines have been recognized on the eastern, southeastern and southern slopes of the volcano, and cirques have been found at 5,000 metres (16,000 ft) elevation. These landforms suggest that the mountain was formerly glaciated. Three sets of moraines have been described, one at 4,400 metres (14,400 ft) elevation possibly linked to the Last Glacial Maximum, an older one at 4,500 metres (14,800 ft) elevation and a third at 4,900 metres (16,100 ft) elevation which may have formed during the Little Ice Age; moraines reach thicknesses of 200 metres (660 ft). There is an additional set of moraines at 4,350–4,300 metres (14,270–14,110 ft) elevation that has been correlated to pre-last glacial maximum glaciations, as well as traces of ice cored moraines and rock glaciers. Some rock glaciers still exist; unlike other glacial bodies in Chile the fronts of rock glaciers on Tacora are not retreating.

The mountain is an important source of water for the region. The Azufre River, a major tributary of the Lluta River, originates on Tacora, and its waters are highly salty owing to their origin on the volcano. The Chislluma River flows past the northeastern flank of Tacora and the Rio Caracarani past the southeastern one; finally, the Mauri Canal and Uchusuma Canal run along the southeastern slopes.

On the western and northwestern flanks, solfataras are present both in the form of fumaroles and of steaming ground, and the Aguas Calientes de Tacora hot springs are located 2 kilometres (1.2 mi) southwest of the volcano. Further, geyserite cones indicate that geysers were formerly active on the volcano. Seismic tomography has been used to image both the hydrothermal systems and magma systems of the volcano. Prospecting for geothermal power generation concluded it is a "highly favourable area". In 2009, the Chilean Ministry of Mining recorded bids for geothermal development at Tacora, and one bid was approved by the Ministry in early 2010.

=== Fumaroles ===
Fumarole gases are dominated by water vapour with other components including carbon dioxide, hydrogen chloride, hydrogen fluoride, hydrogen sulfide, nitrogen and sulfur dioxide. Hydrogen, methane and other hydrocarbons are also common in the exhalations. The temperatures of the fumaroles reach 82–93 °C (180–199 °F) and daily sulfur dioxide emissions have been estimated to be 0.01–0.02 tonnes per day (0.12–0.23 g/s) in the major fumaroles.

The fumarolic gases are interpreted to originate by the evaporation of an aquifer that is saturated by solfataric components, resulting both in the exhalation of gases and the development of acid hot springs. This aquifer is mostly replenished by precipitation and to a lesser degree by magmatic water. Further, there appears to be a hydrothermal system with temperatures of 270–310 °C (518–590 °F) under the volcano that fumarolic gases pass through, and a magma system between sea level and 2 kilometres (1.2 mi) of depth. Overall, fumarolic gases at Tacora undergo substantial interaction with rocks and hydrothermal systems before they reach the surface. A cluster of seismic activity below the eastern flank may also be correlated to a fluid system at depth.

== Geology ==
Subduction of the Nazca Plate beneath the South America Plate is responsible for the volcanism of the Andes. This volcanism does not occur along the entire strike of the Andes, but in three selected volcanic belts, the Northern Volcanic Zone, the Central Volcanic Zone and the Southern Volcanic Zone. A fourth volcanic zone, the Austral Volcanic Zone, lies south of the Southern Volcanic Zone. These volcanically active belts are separated by gaps where recent volcanism is absent and the subducting plate descends in a much shallower angle.

Volcanoes of the Peruvian Central Volcanic Zone generally occur within a narrow belt and are usually associated with normal faults. Most edifices are between 1,500–3,000 metres (4,900–9,800 ft) high above their basement and consist of lava flows and pyroclastics. Old edifices are far more common in Chile than in Peru, and are especially rare in the northwestern part of Peru's volcanic zone; this may be the consequence of climatic factors or a later start of volcano-building activity in Peru. About 17 volcanoes are fumarolically active in northern Chile, with igneous activity limited to about 6.

The earliest volcanic activity in northern Chile occurred between 41 and 66 million years ago, and is linked to an ancient volcanic arc. Later during the Miocene two separate but partially overlapping volcanic episodes occurred, the first of which was dominated by the emplacement of ignimbrites and the second by the growth composite volcanoes, with vigorous activity during the Pliocene and Pleistocene.

=== Local ===
The basement beneath Tacora is formed by the Arica Altiplano, a formation lying at about 4,200 metres (13,800 ft) altitude that consists of various sedimentary and volcanic rocks of Pliocene to Pleistocene age. Tacora together with Chupiquiña, Nevado El Fraile and Nevado La Monja forms a 10 kilometres (6.2 mi) long alignment of volcanoes that crosses into Peru and extends from south to north. In addition, a fault system known as the Challaviento reverse fault passes underneath the volcano; it also extends into Peru where it belongs to the active Incapuquio–Challaviento fault system.

=== Composition ===
The volcano is composed of dacite and lesser amounts of andesite in the form of pyroclastic material and lava flows; the latter are predominantly andesitic to basaltic andesite. Minerals contained in the lava flows are biotite, hornblende, olivine, plagioclase and both orthopyroxene and clinopyroxene; alteration has led to the formation of clays. The volcanic rocks are subdivided into two units, an andesitic-dacitic one that forms the bulk of the volcano dacitic lava dome.

== Eruptive history ==
Tacora was active during the Pleistocene and Holocene epochs less than 700,000 years ago, with one rock sample dated by potassium-argon dating giving an age of 490,000 years before present, an age often given to the entire volcano, as well as another of 50,000 years before present on the upper western flank. Other dating efforts have yielded ages of 340,000 ± 60,000 and 363,000 ± 7,000 years ago. The crater and lava flows on the southern flank are probably the most recent manifestations of volcanic activity. Tacora is a possible source of the AD 400-720 Khonkho tephra.

The volcano supposedly "collapsed" in the 1877 Iquique earthquake, according to secondhand information in a 1903 report on earthquakes in Chile. Single reports of activity in 1830, 1930, 1937, 1939 and 1950 exist, but the volcano is considered to have no historic eruptions, with fumaroles and seismicity the only ongoing activity. Renewed activity is likely to mostly affect the southern, eastern and western slopes of the volcano. In particular the town of Tacora would be threatened, while pyroclastic fallout could impact more distant towns such as Visviri.

== Mining and sulfur ==
Sulfur is found between Tacora and Chupiquiña, and it has been quarried on the northwestern flank. Sulfur deposits on Tacora are among the largest in Chile, with thick layers of sulfur covering surfaces of 0.2–0.3 square kilometres (0.077–0.116 sq mi) in the crater and on the northern and eastern slopes. Fumarolic activity is to this day producing new sulfur deposits, and some sulfur deposits may have been originally emplaced as liquid sulfur.

Such sulfur deposits are relatively common on volcanoes of northern Chile, with less common occurrence in the other volcanically active parts of the Chilean Andes; nearly all higher volcanoes in northern Chile are reported to host the mineral. The sulfur develops chiefly from hydrogen sulfide in steam, which precipitates the mineral in rock cavities. Sulfur deposits are typically accompanied by discoloured rocks, since the formation of the sulfur is usually associated with hydrothermal alteration of rock formations. These colours can be spotted from large distances. Aside from sulfur, such deposits commonly contain antimony, arsenic, selenium and tellurium; acid mine drainage occurs on the volcano and has resulted in pollution of the Azufre River within the Lluta River watershed.

The earliest records of the sulfur bodies on Tacora date back to 1637. Sulfur mining in Chile commenced in the late 19th century, driven by Peruvian, English and Chilean prospectors and because the world demand of sulfur by the chemical industry and for other uses increased substantially at that time. During the early 20th century, sulfur mining was widespread in northern Chile and of high global importance, a number of highly pure deposits of sulfur can be found in northern Chile from the Peruvian border south to the Puna de Atacama region.

A. Barrón, Filomeno Cerda, Luis Koch and Rosa Landaeta owned sulfur deposits on Tacora in 1897, and sulfur processing plants were installed in 1888 and 1900 close to Tacora. Several companies mined in the region, which later were sometimes taken over by foreign corporations. A number of mines were active on Tacora volcano, with much of the mining infrastructure being present on the upper northwestern slopes of the mountain; this infrastructure includes cableways, offices, workers' camps and treatment plants both on the mountain and on its foot. The deposits were named Aguas Calientes, Ancara, Chislluma, Santa Elena and Villa Industrial, and the total sulfur ore deposits of Tacora in 1952 were estimated to be 2,000,000 tonnes (2,000,000 long tons; 2,200,000 short tons) at a minimum; in 1922 Tacora was considered the most important sulfur deposit of the Andes.

Transport of sulfur occurred through a dedicated railroad down to Villa Industrial on the Arica-La Paz railway, which served the further transport of the sulfur to Arica, from where it was shipped to all of South America; only after the opening of this railway in 1913 was it possible to use the Tacora deposits to the fullest extent. It is worth noting that the 1929 border treaty between Peru and Chile had explicitly placed Tacora's sulfur deposits entirely within Chilean territory.

The workforce of the Tacora mines was largely indigenous in origin, seeing as only indigenous people were used to the extreme climate conditions on the upper slopes of Tacora. The mining operations also played an important political-cultural role, as they exemplified the imposition of a new, modern culture onto the region.

== Mythology ==
The religious worship of mountains is widespread in the Central Andes. In local belief, Tacora and Sajama were two mountains in competition for two women (the Nevados de Payachata). Depending on the specific myth either the two women drove Tacora off and removed the top of the mountain, or Sajama did and injured Tacora; Tacora subsequently fled, shedding blood and a piece of its heart.

== Botanics ==
The Astragalus species Astragalus tacorensis is named after the volcano, which is its type locality. The flowering plant Pycnophyllum macropetalum likewise has its type locality at Tacora.

== See also ==
- List of volcanoes in Chile
- List of Ultras of South America
