= Wila Wilani (Tacna) =

Archaeological site in Peru

- Interactive map of Wila Wilani
- 17°51′41.41″S 69°55′25.42″W
- Location: Peru
- Region: Tacna Region, Tacna Province, Palca District

Wila Wilani (Aymara wila blood, blood-red, the reduplication indicates that there is a group or a complex of something, -ni a suffix to indicate ownership, "the one with a complex of red color" or "the one with a lot of blood", hispanicized spelling Vilavilani) is an archaeological site with rock art in Peru. It is located in the Tacna Region, Tacna Province, Palca District, near Wila Wilani (Vilavilane, Vilavilani). The motives of the paintings are predominantly hunting scenes with camelids.
