= Chulluncane (Peru) =

Mountain in Peru

- Location within Peru

Highest point
- Elevation: 4,600 m (15,100 ft)
- Coordinates: 17°45′49″S 69°52′12″W

Geography
- Location: Peru, Tacna Region, Tacna Province, Palca District
- Parent range: Andes

Chulluncane (possibly from Aymara chullunkhä ('ä' stands for a long 'a') icicle, -ni a suffix, "the one with icicles") is a mountain in the Andes of Peru which reaches a height of approximately 4,600 m (15,100 ft). It is located in the Tacna Region, Tacna Province, Palca District.
