= Achacollo (Peru) =

Mountain in Peru

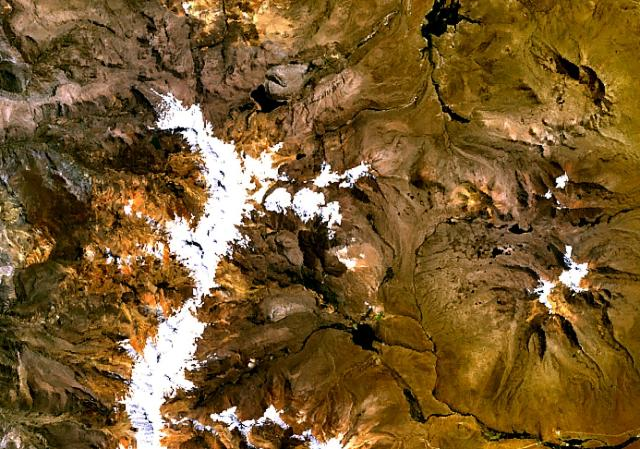
- Barroso mountain range (on the left) as seen from space (NASA Landsat). Achacollo is visible on the bottom of the image.

Highest point
- Elevation: 5,690 m (18,670 ft)
- Coordinates: 17°33′48″S 69°52′15″W

Geography
- Location within Peru
- Location: Peru, Tacna Region
- Parent range: Andes, Barroso

Achacollo (possibly from Aymara Jach'a Qullu, jach'a big, great, qullu mountain, "big mountain") is a mountain in the Barroso mountain range in the Andes of Peru, about 5,690 metres (18,668 ft) high. It is situated in the Tacna Region, Tacna Province, Palca District, and in the Tarata Province, Estique District, northwest of the Chupiquiña volcano and Huancune.

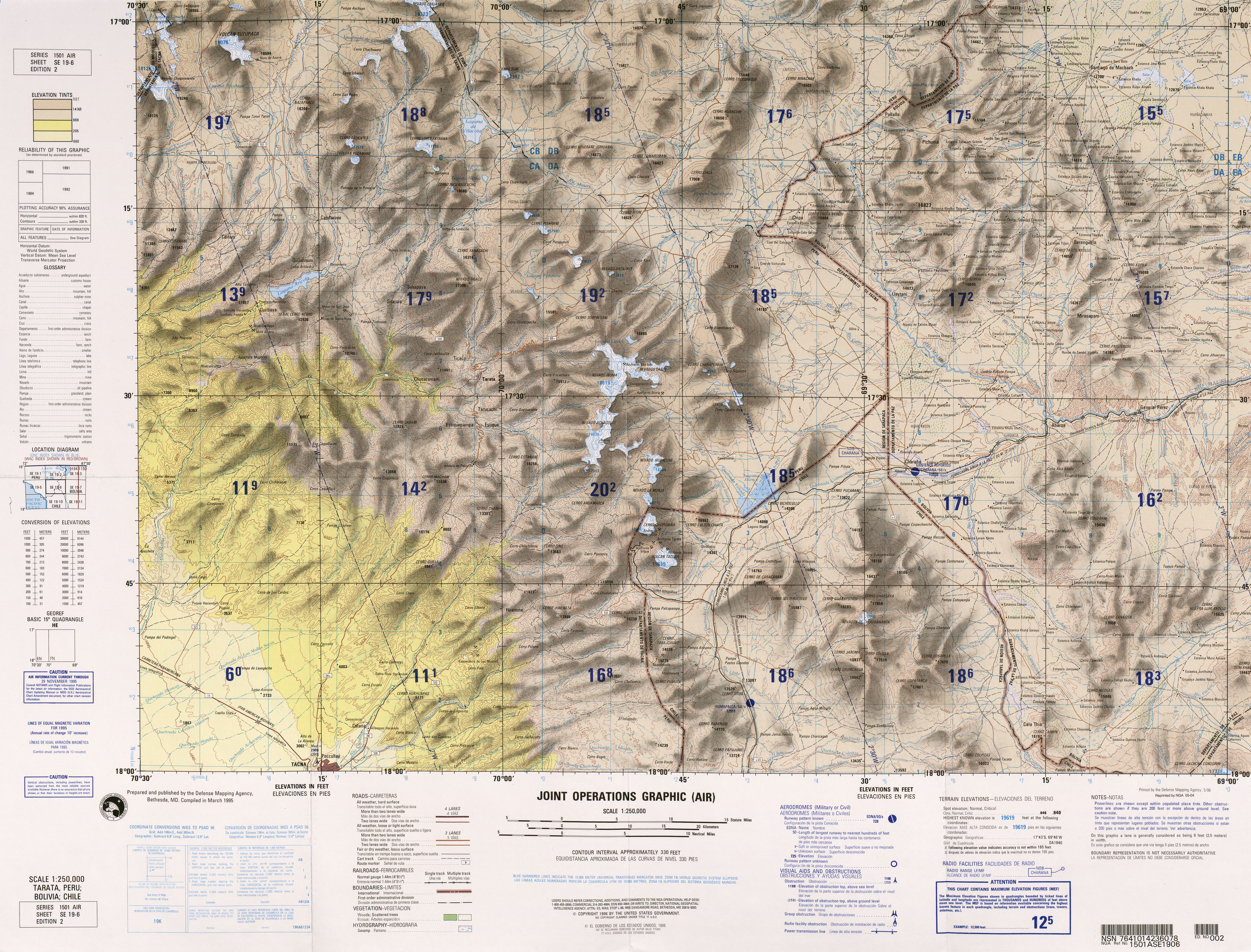
Map of the area showing Achacollo
