= Uchusuma River =

River in Peru, Chile, and Bolivia

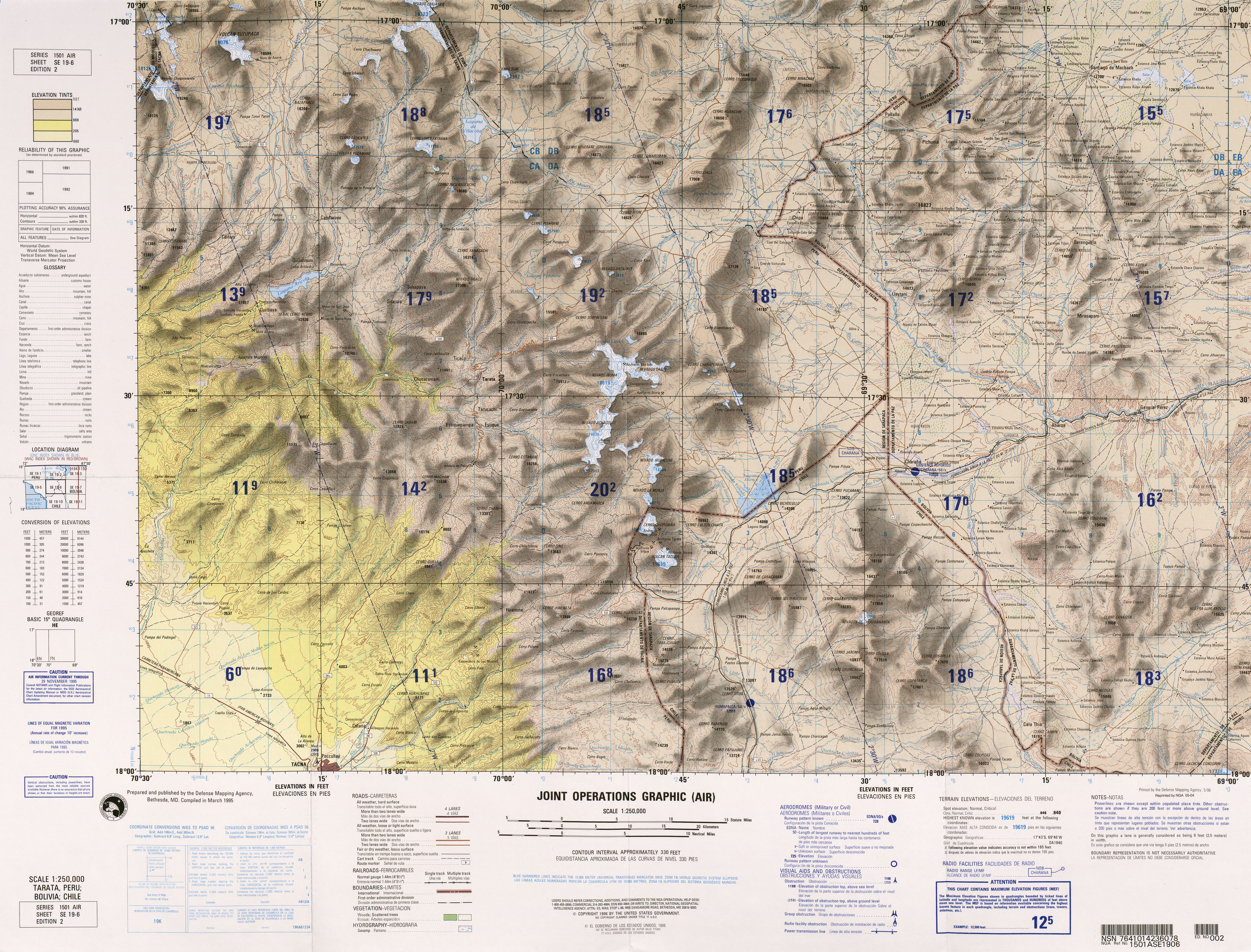
- Uchusuma River can be seen in the centre-right of the map

Location
- Countries: Bolivia; Chile; Peru

Physical characteristics
- Source
  - location: Peru
- Mouth
  - location: Mauri River

The Uchusuma River originates from the Peruvian Altiplano, crosses the northern tip of Chile and reaches Bolivia where empties into Mauri River.

== See also ==
- List of rivers of Bolivia
- List of rivers of Chile
- List of rivers of Peru
