= Mauri River =

Coordinates: 17.2961°S 68.6092°W

Location
- Country: Bolivia; Peru

The Mauri River is a river of Bolivia and Peru. It rises on the frontier between Chile and Bolivia near Charaña and flows east-northeast for about 100 km where it joins the Desaguadero. In fact the Mauri is much larger than the Desaguadero at this point, but below the confluence the name Desaguadero prevails.

== See also ==
- List of rivers of Bolivia
- List of rivers of Peru
