= Huancune (Peru) =

Mountain in Peru

- Location within Peru

Highest point
- Elevation: 5,567 m (18,264 ft)
- Coordinates: 17°35′42.7″S 69°47′21.3″W

Geography
- Location: Peru, Tacna Region
- Parent range: Andes, Barroso

Huancune (possibly from Aymara wanq'u guinea pig) is a volcano in the Barroso mountain range in the Andes of Peru, about 5,567 m (18,264 ft) high. It is situated in the Tacna Region, Tacna Province, Palca District, southeast of Achacollo and north of the Chupiquiña volcano.

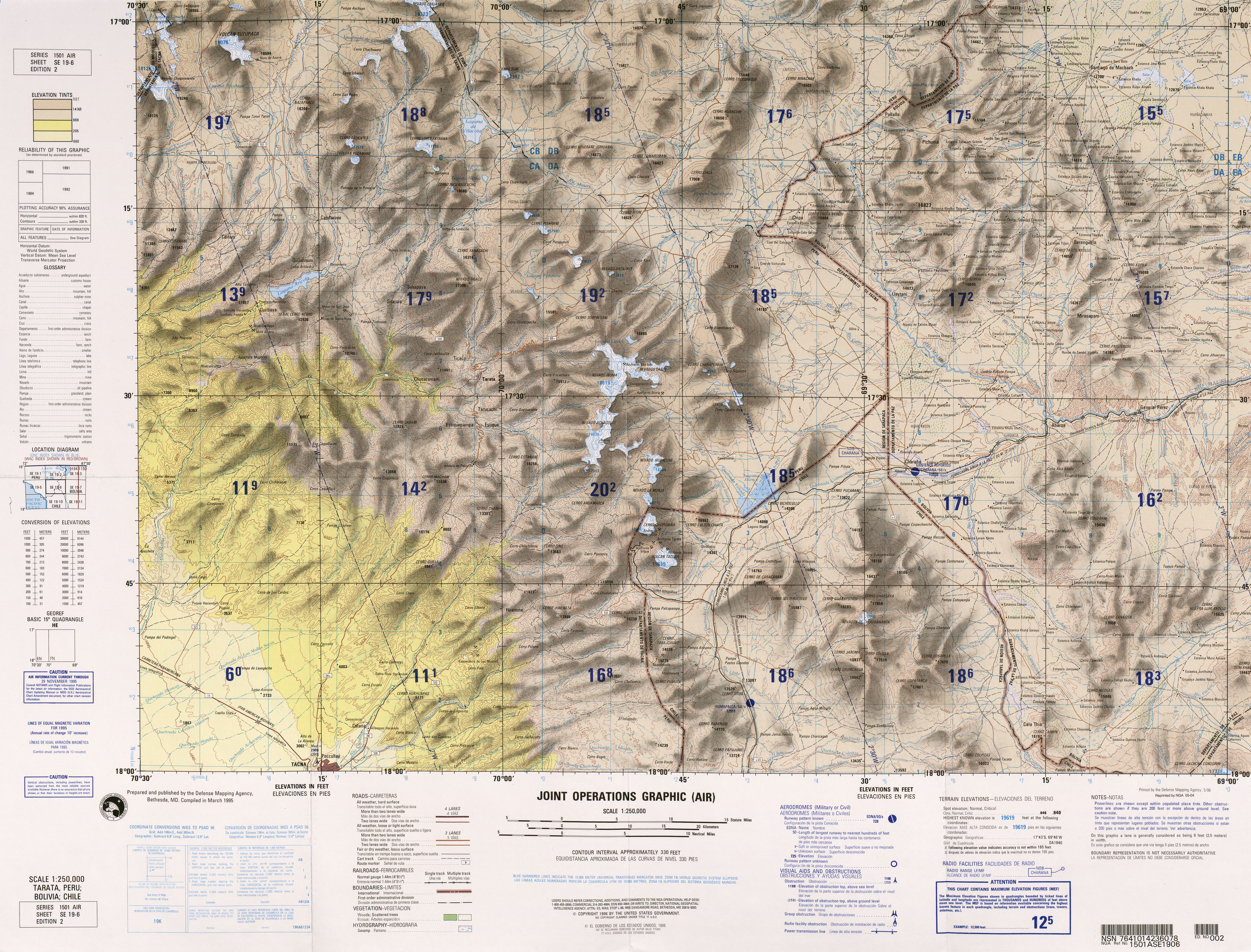
Map of the area showing Huancune
