= Caplina River =

River in Peru

Caplina River Rio Caplina
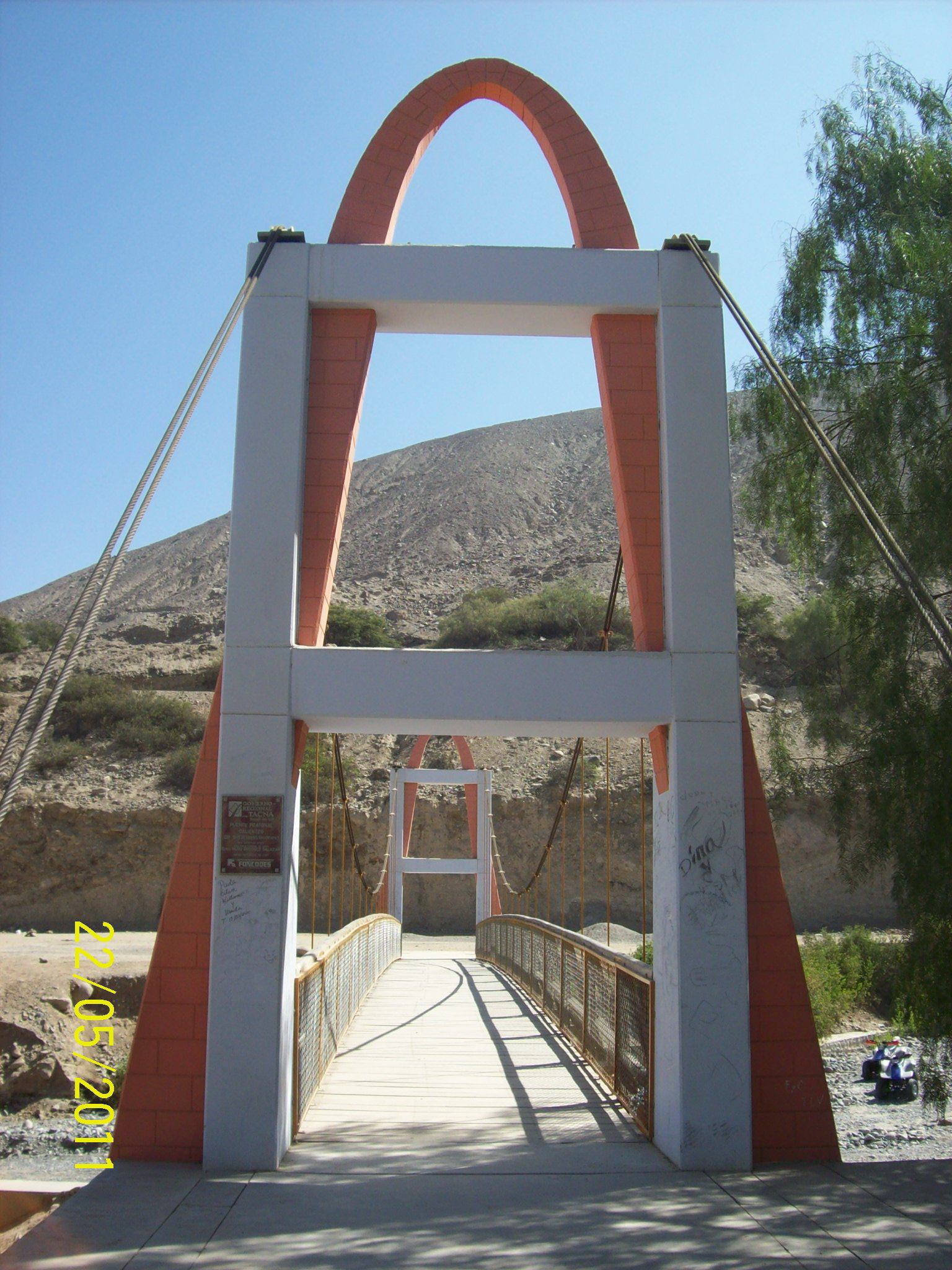

- Location of mouth

Location
- Country: Peru
- Region: Tacna Region

Physical characteristics
- Mouth
  - location: Pacific Ocean
  - coordinates: 18°14′00″S 70°33′00″W

The Caplina River (Rio Caplina) is a river in southern Peru. It runs through the city Tacna, after which it gets dry due to filtration, evaporation and extractive use of the water.
