= Principalía =

Ruling class in the Spanish Philippines

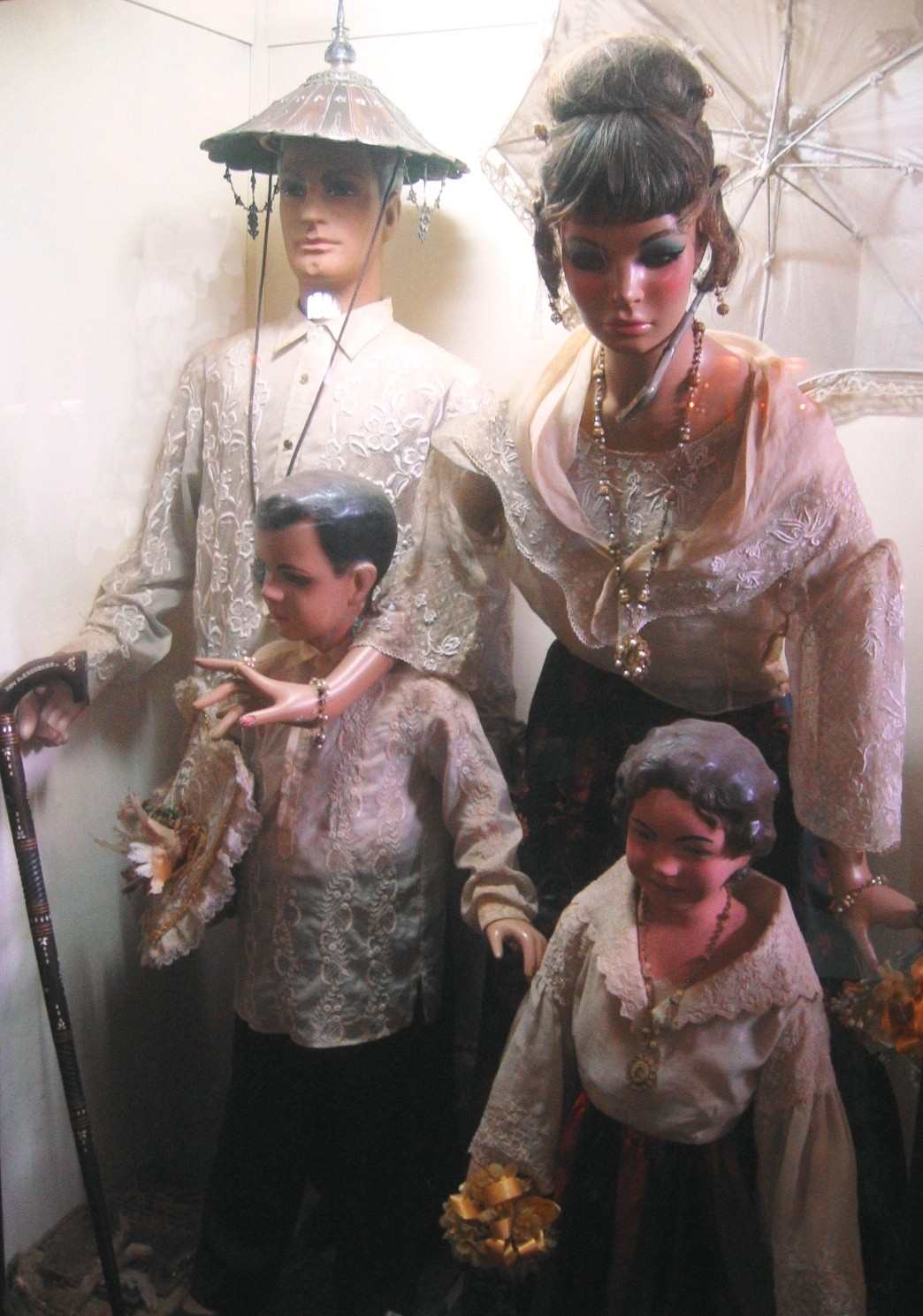
Typical costume of a family belonging to the principalía of the late 19th century Philippines. Exhibit in the Villa Escudero Museum, San Pablo, Laguna.

The principalía or noble class was the ruling and usually educated upper class in the pueblos of Spanish Philippines, comprising the gobernadorcillo (later called the capitán municipal and had functions similar to a town mayor), tenientes de justicia (lieutenants of justice), and the cabezas de barangay (heads of the barangays) who governed the districts. Also included in this class were former gobernadorcillos or municipal captains, and municipal lieutenants in good standing during their term of office. (Note: In 1893, the Maura Law was passed to reorganize town governments with the aim of making them more effective and autonomous, changing the designation of town leaders from gobernadorcillo to capitan municipal in 1893.)

The distinction or status of being part of the principalía was originally a hereditary right. (Note: Durante la dominación española, el 'cacique', jefe de un barangay, ejercía funciones judiciales y administrativas. A los tres años tenía el tratamiento de 'don' y se reconocía capacidad para ser 'gobernadorcillo', con facultades para nombrarse un auxiliar llamado 'primogenito', siendo hereditario el cargo de jefe.) However, a royal decree dated December 20, 1863 (signed in the name of Queen Isabella II by the Minister of the Colonies, José de la Concha), made possible the creation of new principales under certain defined criteria, among which was proficiency in the Castilian language. (Note: Article 16 of the Royal Decree of December 20, 1863, says: After a school has been established in any village for fifteen years, no natives who cannot speak, read and write the Castilian language shall form part of the principalía unless they enjoy that distinction by right of inheritance. After the school has been established for thirty years, only those who possess the above‑mentioned condition shall enjoy exemption from the personal service tax, except in the case of the sick. Isabel II) (Note: The royal decree was implemented in the Philippines by the Governor‑General through a circular signed on August 30, 1867. Section III of the circular says: The law has considered them very carefully and it is fitting for the supervisor to unfold before the eyes of the parents so that their simple intelligence may well understand that not only ought they, but that it is profitable for them to send their children to school, for after the schools have been established for fifteen years in the village of their tribes those who cannot speak, read, or write Castilian: cannot be gobernadorcillos; nor lieutenants of justice; nor form part of the principalía; unless they enjoy that privilege because of heredity... General Gándara, Circular of the Superior Civil Government Giving Rules for the Good Discharge of School Supervision) (Note: The increase of population during the colonial period consequently needed the creation of new leaders, with this quality. The emergence of the mestizo culture (both Filipinos of Spanish descent and Filipinos of Chinese descent) had also necessitated this, and even the subsequent designation of separate institutions or offices of gobernadorcillos for the different mestizo groups and for the indigenous tribes living in the same territories or cities with large population.) Later, wider conditions that defined the principalía were stipulated in the norms provided by the Maura Law of 1893, which was in force until Spain lost the Philippines to the United States in 1898. The Maura Law also redefined the title of the head of municipal government from gobernadorcillo to capitán municipal, and extended the distinction as principales to citizens paying 50 pesos in land tax.

Prior to the Maura Law, this distinguished upper class included only those exempted from tribute (tax) to the Spanish crown. (Note: The cabezas, their wives, and first‑born sons enjoyed exemption from the payment of tribute to the Spanish crown.) Colonial documents would refer to them as "de privilegio y gratis", in contrast to those who pay tribute ("de pago"). It was the true aristocracy and nobility of the Spanish colonial Philippines, (Note: L'institution des chefs de barangay a été empruntée aux Indiens chez qui on la trouvée établie lors de la conquête des Philippines; ils formaient, à cette époque une espèce de noblesse héréditaire. L'hérédité leur a été conservée aujourd hui: quand une de ces places devient vacante, la nomination du successeur est faite par le surintendant des finances dans les pueblos qui environnent la capitale, et, dans les provinces éloignées, par l'alcalde, sur la proposition du gobernadorcillo et la présentation des autres membres du barangay; il en est de même pour les nouvelles créations que nécessite de temps à autre l'augmentation de la population. Le cabeza, sa femme et l'aîné de ses enfants sont exempts du tributo) (Note: Esta institucion (Cabecería de Barangay), mucho más antigua que la sujecion de las islas al Gobierno, ha merecido siempre las mayores atencion. En un principio eran las cabecerías hereditarias, y constituian la verdadera hidalguía del país; mas del dia, si bien en algunas provincias todavía se trasmiten por sucesion hereditaria, las hay tambien eleccion, particularmente en las provincias más inmediatas á Manila, en donde han perdido su prestigio y son una verdadera carga. En las provincias distantes todavía se hacen respetar, y allí es precisamente en donde la autoridad tiene ménos que hacer, y el órden se conserva sin necesidad de medidas coercitivas; porque todavía existe en ellas el gobierno patriarcal, por el gran respeto que la plebe conserva aún á lo que llaman aquí principalía.) roughly analogous to the patrician class in Ancient Rome. The principales (members of the principalía) traced their origin to the pre‑colonial maginoo ruling class of established kingdoms, rajahnates, confederacies, and principalities, as well as the lordships of the smaller, ancient social units called barangays (Note: "There were no kings or lords throughout these islands who ruled over them as in the manner of our kingdoms and provinces; but in every island, and in each province of it, many chiefs were recognized by the natives themselves. Some were more powerful than others, and each one had his followers and subjects, by districts and families; and these obeyed and respected the chief. Some chiefs had friendship and communication with others, and at times wars and quarrels. These principalities and lordships were inherited in the male line and by succession of father and son and their descendants. If these were lacking, then their brothers and collateral relatives succeeded... When any of these chiefs was more courageous than others in war and upon other occasions, such a one enjoyed more followers and men; and the others were under his leadership, even if they were chiefs. These latter retained to themselves the lordship and particular government of their own following, which is called barangay among them. They had datos and other special leaders [mandadores] who attended to the interests of the barangay.") in the Visayas, Luzon, and Mindanao. (Note: Por otra parte, mientras en las Indias la cultura precolombiana había alcanzado un alto nivel, en Filipinas la civilización isleña continuaba manifestándose en sus estados más primitivos. Sin embargo, esas sociedades primitivas, independientes totalmente las unas de las otras, estaban en cierta manera estructuradas y se apreciaba en ellas una organización jerárquica embrionaria y local, pero era digna de ser atendida. Precisamente en esa organización local es, como siempre, de donde nace la nobleza. El indio aborigen, jefe de tribu, es reconocido como noble y las pruebas irrefutables de su nobleza se encuentran principalmente en las Hojas de Servicios de los militares de origen filipino que abrazaron la carrera de las Armas, cuando para hacerlo necesariamente era preciso demostrar el origen nobiliario del individuo.)

The members of this class enjoyed exclusive privileges: only members of the principalía were allowed to vote, be elected to public office, and bear the titles Don or Doña. (Note: Durante la dominación española, el cacique, jefe de un barangay, ejercía funciones judiciales y administrativas. A los tres años tenía el tratamiento de don y se reconocía capacidad para ser gobernadorcillo.) The use of the honorific addresses "Don" and "Doña" was strictly limited to what many documents during the colonial period would refer to as "vecinas y vecinos distinguidos". (Note: "También en este sector, el uso de las palabras doña y don se limito estrechamente a vecinas y vecinos distinguidos.")

For the most part, the social privileges of the nobles were freely acknowledged as befitting their greater social responsibilities. The gobernadorcillo during that period received a nominal salary and was not provided a public services budget by the central government. In fact, the gobernadorcillo often had to govern his municipality by looking after the post office and the jailhouse, alongside managing public infrastructure, using personal resources.

Principales also provided assistance to parishes by helping in the construction of church buildings, and in the pastoral and religious activities of the clergy who, being usually among the few Spaniards in most colonial towns, had success in earning the goodwill of the natives. More often, the clergy were the sole representatives of Spain in many parts of the archipelago. (Note: There was only a very small standing army to protect the Spanish government in the Philippines. This ridiculous situation made an old viceroy of New Spain say: "En cada fraile tenía el Rey en Filipinas un capitán general y un ejército entero." ("In each friar in the Philippines the King had a captain general and a whole army.")) Under the patronato real of the Spanish crown, Spanish churchmen were also the king's de facto ambassadors, (Note: "Of little avail would have been the valor and constancy with which Legaspi and his worthy companions overcame the natives of the islands, if the apostolic zeal of the missionaries had not seconded their exertions, and aided to consolidate the enterprise. The latter were the real conquerors; they who without any other arms than their virtues, gained over the good will of the islanders, caused the Spanish name to be beloved, and gave the king, as it were by a miracle, two millions more of submissive and Christian subjects.") and promoters (Note: "C'est par la seule influence de la religion que l'on a conquis les Philippines, et cette influence pourra seule les conserver." ("It is only by the influence of religion that Philippines was conquered. Only this influence could keep them.")) of the realm.

With the end of Spanish sovereignty over the Philippines after the Spanish–American War in 1898 and the introduction of a democratic, republican system during the American colonial period, the principalía and their descendants lost legal authority and social privileges. Many were, however, able to integrate into the new socio-political structure, retaining some degree of influence and power. (Note: The American Era in the Philippines provides a unique opportunity to explore concepts that shaped American imperialism. The nature of imperialism in the Philippines is understood not only in the policy decisions of governments but also in the experience of particular social groups who lived there. Therefore, this study emphasizes the cultural and economic interchange between American colonists and Filipinos from 1901 until 1940. American colonialism in the Philippines fostered complex cultural relationships as seen through individual identity. To some extent Americans developed a transnational worldview by living within the Philippines while maintaining connections to America. Filipinos viewed American colonialism from the perspective of their Spanish traditions, a facet often undervalued by the new regime... Many Americans who lived in the Islands engaged in commerce. Trade served as a natural domain for foreigners as it had over the centuries. Filipinos retained ownership of large tracts of the countryside supported by Washington's policies that limited American investments, especially through tariff structures. The emphasis on business in the Islands followed a broader trend during the 1920s of rejecting progressive regulation in favor of the free market. These men and women developed a mentality of Americans in the Philippines, an important distinction. They lived in the Islands while confining social contacts to their peers by means of restrictive clubs and associations.)

== Historical background ==
=== Pre-colonial principalities ===
From the beginning of the colonial period in the Philippines, the Spanish government built on the traditional pre‑conquest socio‑political organization of the barangay and co‑opted the traditional indigenous princes and their nobles, thereby ruling indirectly. (Note: For more information regarding the social system in barangays of the Indigenous Philippine society before the Spanish colonization, see Enciclopedia Universal Ilustrada Europeo-Americana, Vol. VII. The article also says: Los nobles de un barangay eran los más ricos ó los más fuertes, formándose por este sistema los dattos ó maguinoos, principes á quienes heredaban los hijos mayores, las hijas á falta de éstos, ó los parientes más próximos si no tenían descendencia directa; pero siempre teniendo en cuenta las condiciones de fuerza ó de dinero...Los vassalos plebeyos tenían que remar en los barcos del maguinoo, cultivar sus campos y pelear en la guerra. Los siervos, que formaban el término medio entre los esclavos y los hombres libres, podían tener propriedad individual, mujer, campos, casa y esclavos; pero los tagalos debían pagar una cantidad en polvo de oro equivalente á una parte de sus cosechas, los de los barangayes bisayas estaban obligados á trabajar en las tieras del señor cinco días al mes, pagarle un tributo anual en arroz y hacerle un presente en las fiestas. Durante la dominación española, el cacique, jefe de un barangay, ejercía funciones judiciales y administrativas. A los tres años tenía el tratamiento de don y se reconocía capacidad para ser gobernadorcillo, con facultades para nombrarse un auxiliar llamado primogenito, siendo hereditario el cargo de jefe.) (Note: It should also be noted that the more popular and official term used to refer to the leaders of the district or to the cacique during the Spanish period was Cabeza de Barangay.) The coastal barangays of Panay, (Note: In Panay, the existence of highly developed and independent principalities of Ogtong (Oton) and that of Araut (Dumangas) were well known to early Spanish settlers in the Philippines. The Augustinian historian Gaspar de San Agustin, for example, wrote about the existence of an ancient and illustrious nobility in Araut, in his book he said: "También fundó convento el Padre Fray Martin de Rada en Araut – que ahora se llama el convento de Dumangas – con la advocación de nuestro Padre San Agustín...Está fundado este pueblo casi a los fines del río de Halaur, que naciendo en unos altos montes en el centro de esta isla (Panay)...Es el pueblo muy hermoso, ameno y muy lleno de palmares de cocos. Antiguamente era el emporio y corte de la más lucida nobleza de toda aquella isla.") Manila, Bohol, Cebu, Jolo, and Butuan, with cosmopolitan cultures and trade relations with other countries in Asia, were already established principalities (kinadatuan) before the coming of the Spaniards. In other regions, even though the majority of these barangays were not large settlements, yet they had organized societies dominated by the same type of recognized aristocracy and lordships (with birthright claim to allegiance from followers), as those found in more established, richer and more developed principalities. (Note: "There were no kings or lords throughout these islands who ruled over them as in the manner of our kingdoms and provinces; but in every island, and in each province of it, many chiefs were recognized by the natives themselves. Some were more powerful than others, and each one had his followers and subjects, by districts and families; and these obeyed and respected the chief. Some chiefs had friendship and communication with others, and at times wars and quarrels. These principalities and lordships were inherited in the male line and by succession of father and son and their descendants. If these were lacking, then their brothers and collateral relatives succeeded... When any of these chiefs was more courageous than others in war and upon other occasions, such a one enjoyed more followers and men; and the others were under his leadership, even if they were chiefs. These latter retained to themselves the lordship and particular government of their own following, which is called barangay among them. They had datos and other special leaders [mandadores] who attended to the interests of the barangay.") The aristocratic group in these pre‑colonial societies was called the datu class. Its members were presumably the descendants of the first settlers on the land or, in the case of later arrivals, of those who were datus at the time of migration or conquest. (Note: "There were no kings or lords throughout these islands who ruled over them as in the manner of our kingdoms and provinces; but in every island, and in each province of it, many chiefs were recognized by the natives themselves. Some were more powerful than others, and each one had his followers and subjects, by districts and families; and these obeyed and respected the chief. Some chiefs had friendship and communication with others, and at times wars and quarrels. These principalities and lordships were inherited in the male line and by succession of father and son and their descendants. If these were lacking, then their brothers and collateral relatives succeeded... When any of these chiefs was more courageous than others in war and upon other occasions, such a one enjoyed more followers and men; and the others were under his leadership, even if they were chiefs. These latter retained to themselves the lordship and particular government of their own following, which is called barangay among them. They had datos and other special leaders [mandadores] who attended to the interests of the barangay.")

The duty of the datus was to rule and govern their subjects and followers, and to assist them in their interests and necessities. What the chiefs received from their followers was: to be held by them in great veneration and respect; and they were served in their wars and voyages, and in their tilling, sowing, fishing, and the building of their houses. The natives attended to these duties very promptly, whenever summoned by their chief. They also paid their chief tribute (which they called buwis) in varying quantities, in the crops that they gathered. The descendants of such chiefs, and their relatives, even though they did not inherit the lordship, were held in the same respect and consideration, and were all regarded as nobles and as persons exempt from the services rendered by the others, or the plebeians (timawas). The same right of nobility and chieftainship was preserved for the women, just as for the men.

Some of these principalities and lordships have remained, even until the present, in un-Hispanicized (Note: Historians classify four types of unHispanicized societies in the Philippines, some of which still survive in remote and isolated parts of the country: Classless societies; Warrior societies: characterized by a distinct warrior class, in which membership is won by personal achievement, entails privilege, duty and prescribed norms of conduct, and is requisite for community leadership; Petty Plutocracies: which are dominated socially and politically by a recognized class of rich men who attain membership through birthright, property and the performance of specified ceremonies. They are "petty" because their authority is localized, being extended by neither absentee landlordism nor territorial subjugation; Principalities:) and mostly Lumad and Muslim parts of the Philippines, in some regions of Mindanao.

==== Pre-colonial principalities in the Visayas ====
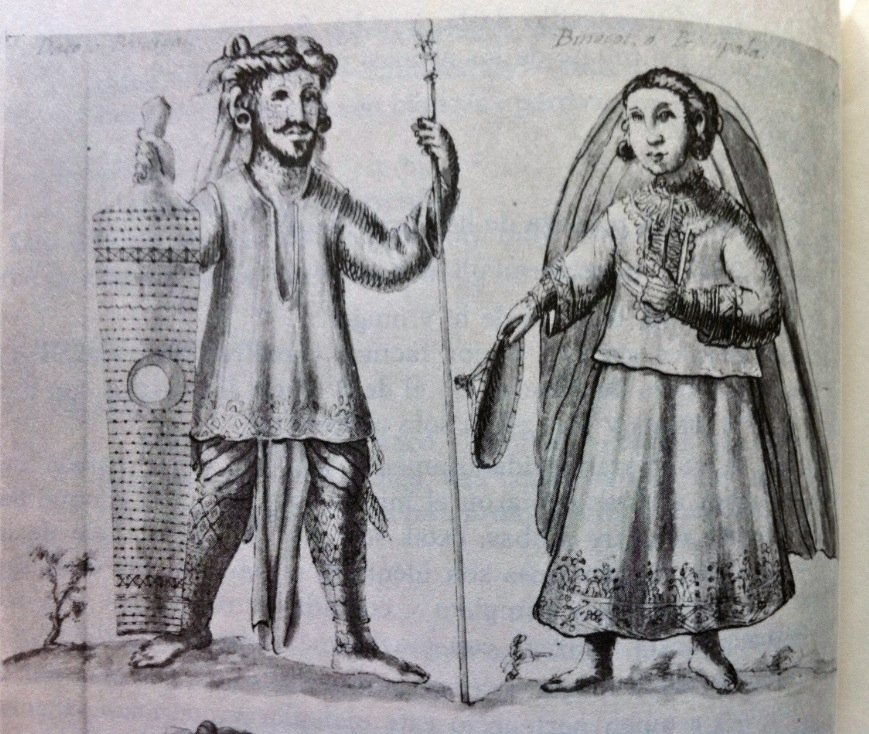
An illustration from Historia de las Islas e Indios de Bisayas (1668) by Francisco Ignacio Alcina depicting a Visayan datu and a binukot noblewoman.

In more developed barangays in Visayas, e.g., Bohol, Cebu, Butuan, and Panay (which were never conquered by Spain but were incorporated into the Spanish sphere of influence as vassals by means of pacts, peace treaties, and reciprocal alliances), (Note: "En las Visayas ayudaba siempre a los amigos, y sujetaba solamente con las armas a los que los ofendian, y aun despues de subyugados no les exigia mas que un reconocimiento en especie, a que se obligan. " ("In the Visayas [Legaspi] always helped friends, and wield weapons only against those who offended them (his friends), and even after he subjugated them (those who offended his friends), he did not demand more than some kind of acknowledgment from those whom he conquered.")) the datu class was at the top of a divinely sanctioned and stable social order in a territorial jurisdiction called in the local languages as sakop or kinadatuan (kadatuan in ancient Malay; kedaton in Javanese; and kedatuan in many parts of modern Southeast Asia), which is elsewhere commonly referred to also as barangay. (Note: The word "sakop" means "jurisdiction", and "kinadatuan" refers to the realm of the datu – his principality.) This social order was divided into three classes. The kadatuan, which is also called tumao (members of the Visayan datu class), were compared by the Boxer Codex to the titled lords (señores de titulo) in Spain. As agalon or amo (lords), (Note: In Panay, even at present, the landed descendants of the principales are still referred to as agalon or amo by their tenants. However, the tenants are no longer called oripun (in Karay‑a, i.e., the Ilonggo sub‑dialect) or olipun (in Sinâ, i.e., Ilonggo spoken in the lowlands and cities). Instead, the tenants are now commonly referred to as tinawo (subjects).) the datus enjoyed an ascribed right to respect, obedience, and support from their oripun (commoner) or followers belonging to the third order. These datus had acquired rights to the same advantages from their legal "timawa" or vassals (second order), who bind themselves to the datu as his seafaring warriors. "Timawas" paid no tribute, and rendered no agricultural labor. They had a portion of the datu's blood in their veins. The Boxer Codex calls these "timawas" knights and hidalgos. The Spanish conquistador, Miguel de Loarca, described them as "free men, neither chiefs nor slaves". In the late 1600s, the Spanish Jesuit priest Fr. Francisco Ignatio Alcina, classified them as the third rank of nobility (nobleza).

To maintain purity of bloodline, datus marry only among their kind, often seeking high ranking brides in other barangays, abducting them, or contracting brideprices in gold, slaves and jewelry. Meanwhile, the datus kept their marriageable daughters secluded for protection and prestige. These well‑guarded and protected highborn women were called "binokot", the datus of pure descent (four generations) were called "potli nga datu" or "lubus nga datu", while a woman of noble lineage (especially the elderly) was addressed by the Visayans (of Panay) as "uray" (meaning: pure as gold), e.g., uray Hilway.

==== Pre-colonial principalities in the Tagalog region ====
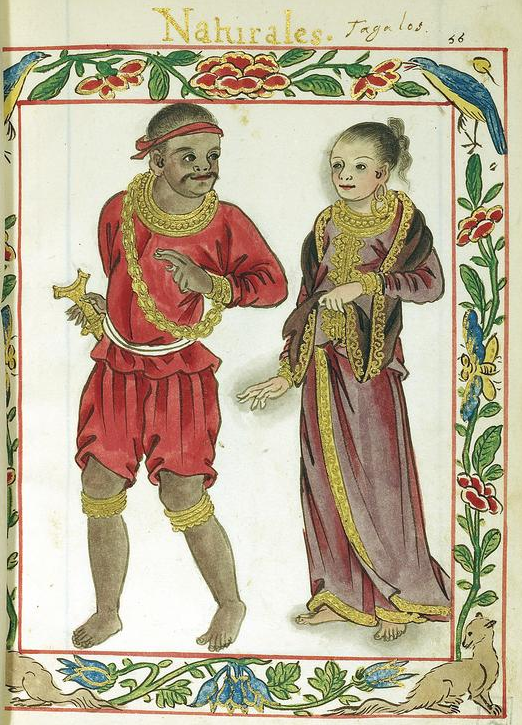
Portrait of an early Spanish era Tagalog noble couple depicted in Boxer Codex. 1590

The different type of culture prevalent in Luzon gave a less stable and more complex social structure to the pre‑colonial Tagalog barangays of Manila, Pampanga and Laguna. Enjoying a more extensive commence than those in Visayas, having the influence of Bornean political contacts, and engaging in farming wet rice for a living, the Tagalogs were described by the Spanish Augustinian Friar Martin de Rada as more traders than warriors.

The more complex social structure of the Tagalogs was less stable during the arrival of the Spaniards because it was still in a process of differentiating.

==== Comparison ====
The Jesuit priest Francisco Colin made an attempt to give an approximate comparison of it with the Visayan social structure in the middle of the seventeenth century. The term datu or lakan, or apo refers to the chief, but the noble class to which the datu belonged or could come from was the maginoo class. One may be born a maginoo, but he could become a datu by personal achievement. In the Visayas, if the datu had the personality and economic means, he could retain and restrain competing peers, relatives, and offspring. The term timawa came into use in the social structure of the Tagalogs within just twenty years after the coming of the Spaniards. The term, however, was being applied to former alipin (third class) who have escaped bondage by payment, favor, or flight. The Tagalog timawas did not have the military prominence of the Visayan timawa. The warrior class in the Tagalog society was present only in Laguna, and they were called the maharlika class. At the early part of the Spanish regime, the number of their members who were coming to rent land from their datus was increasing.

Unlike the Visayan datus, the lakans and apos of Luzon could call all non‑maginoo subjects to work in the datu's fields or do all sorts of other personal labor. In the Visayas, only the oripuns were obliged to do that, and to pay tribute besides. The Tagalog who works in the datu's field did not pay him tribute, and could transfer their allegiance to another datu. The Visayan timawa neither paid tribute nor performed agricultural labor. In a sense, they were truly aristocrats. The Tagalog maharlika did not only work in his datu's field, but could also be required to pay his own rent. Thus, all non‑maginoo formed a common economic class in some sense, though this class had no designation.

The civilization of the pre‑colonial societies in the Visayas, northern Mindanao, and Luzon were largely influenced by Hindu and Buddhist cultures. As such, the datus who ruled these principalities (such as Butuan, Cebu, Panay, Mindoro and Manila) also shared the many customs of royalties and nobles in southeast Asian territories (with Hindu and Buddhist cultures), especially in the way they used to dress and adorn themselves with gold and silk. The Boxer Codex bears testimony to this fact. The measure of the prince's possession of gold and slaves was proportionate to his greatness and nobility. The first westerners who came to the archipelago observed that there was hardly any "Indian" who did not possess chains and other articles of gold.

=== Filipino nobility during the colonial period ===
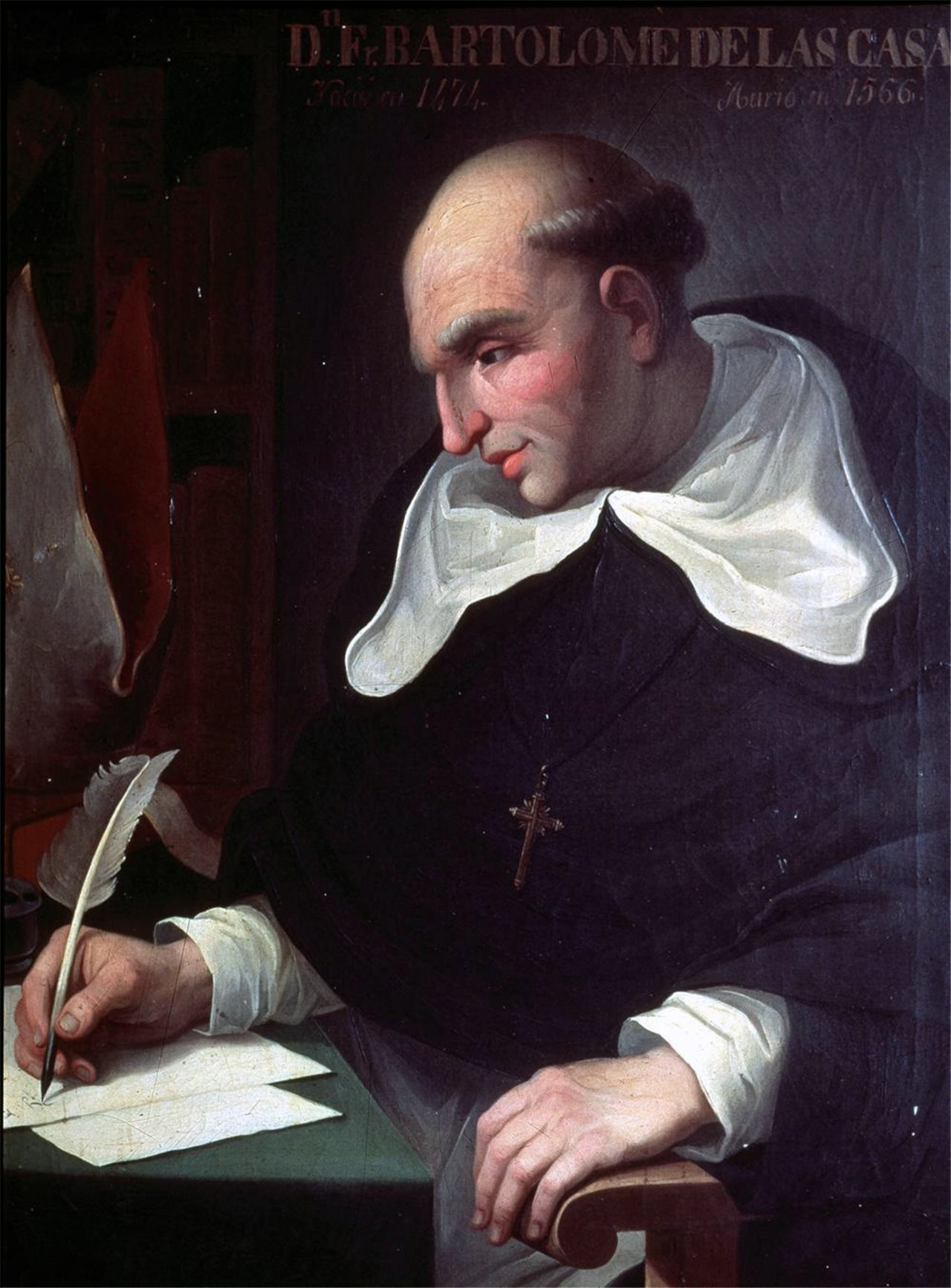
Fray Bartolomé de las Casas

When the Spaniards expanded their dominion to the Americas and later on to the East Indies, they encountered different cultures that existed in these territories, which possessed different social structures (more or less complex) where as a common trait among them, there was a ruling class that held power and determined the destinies of peoples and territories under its control. These elites were those that the Spaniards discovered and conquered in the New World. It was these Spanish conquerors, using European terminology, who correlated the identity of classes of the pre-Hispanic elites, along with the royalty or with the nobility of Europe at the time according to appropriate categories, e.g., emperor, king, etc.

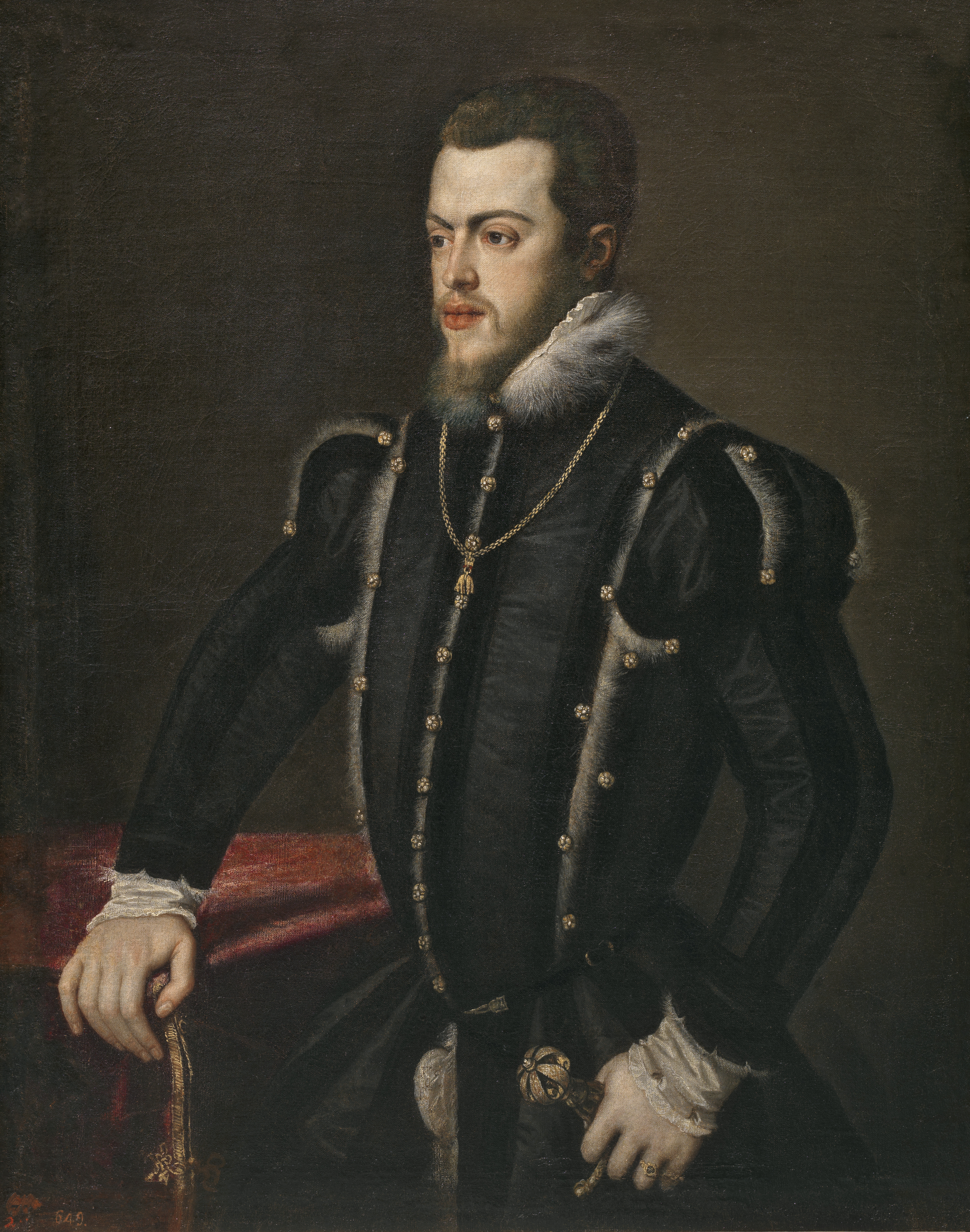
King Philip II of Spain by Titian.

The thoughts of the more notable among them give useful insights on how the first European settlers regarded the rulers of Indians in the New World. Fray Bartolomé de las Casas, for example, would argue that indigenous nobles were "(...) as Princes and Infantes like those of Castile." Juan de Matienzo, during his rule of Peru, said that the "Caciques, curacas and principales are the native princes of the Indians." In the Lexicon of Fray Domingo de Santo Tomás and Diego González Holguín as well as in the work of Ludovico Bertonio, several entries included were devoted to identify the pre-Hispanic society, comparing their old titles to those of their counterpart in the Iberian peninsula. The same approach to the local society in the East Indies was used by the Spaniards.

The principalía was the first estate of the four echelons of Filipino society at the time of contact with Europeans, as described by Fr. Juan de Plasencia, a pioneer Franciscan missionary in the Philippines. Loarca and the Canon Lawyer Antonio de Morga, who classified society into three estates (ruler, ruled, slave), also affirmed the pre‑eminence of the principales. All members of this first estate (the datu class) were principales (Note: Tous les descendants de ces chefs étaient regardés comme nobles et exempts des corvées et autres services auxquels étaient assujettis les roturiers que l'on appelait "timaguas". Les femmes étaient nobles comme les hommes.) whether they were actually occupying positions to rule or not. The Real Academia Española defines principal as, "A person or thing that holds first place in value or importance, and is given precedence and preference before others". This Spanish term best describes the first estate of the society in the archipelago, which the Europeans came in contact with. San Buenaventura's 1613 Dictionary of the Tagalog language defines three terms that clarify the concept of principalía:

1. Poon or punò (chief, leader) – principal or head of a lineage.
2. Ginoo – a noble by lineage and parentage, family and descent.
3. Maguinoo – principal in lineage or parentage.

The Spanish term señor (lord) is equated with all these three terms, which are distinguished from the nouveau riche imitators scornfully called maygintao (man with gold or hidalgo by wealth, and not by lineage). The first estate was the class that constituted a birthright aristocracy with claims to respect, obedience, and support from those of subordinate status.

==== Christianization under the Spanish Crown ====
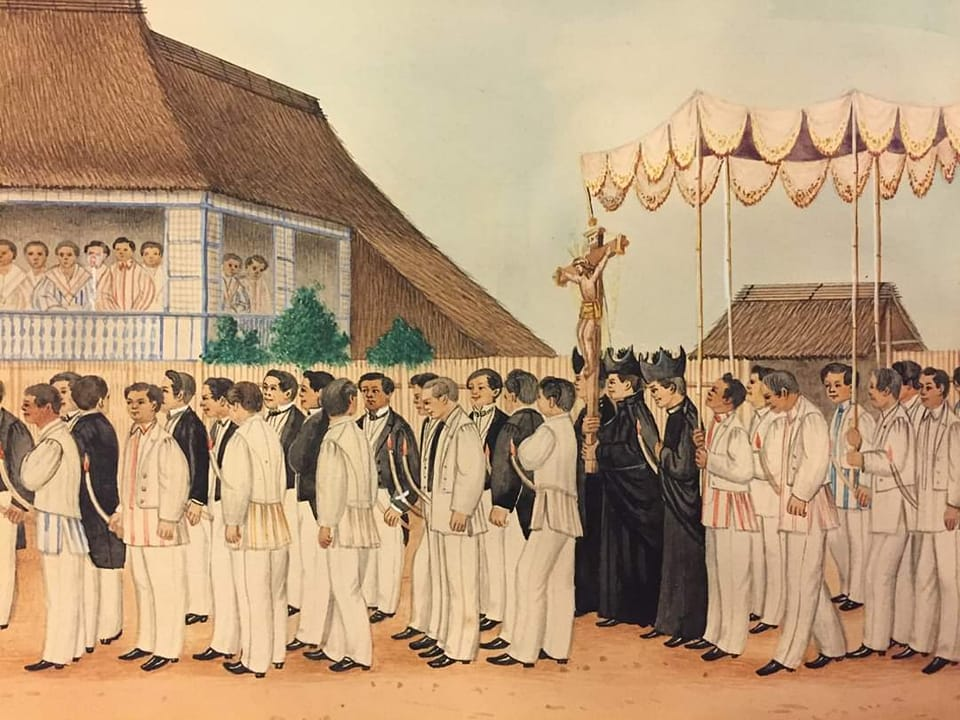
The Principalía of a rural parish in the Philippines, walking in rows in front of the parish priest during the Holy Week procession, c. 1870. Some are carrying the canopy for the crucifix being held by the priest.

With the recognition of the Spanish monarchs came the privilege of being addressed as Don or Doña. (Note: Durante la dominación española, el cacique, jefe de un barangay, ejercía funciones judiciales y administrativas. A los tres años tenía el tratamiento de don y se reconocía capacidad para ser gobernadorcillo.) – a mark of esteem and distinction in Europe reserved for a person of noble or royal status during the colonial period. Other honors and high regard were also accorded to the Christianized datus by the Spanish Empire. For example, the gobernadorcillos (elected leader of the cabezas de barangay or the Christianized datus) and Filipino officials of justice received the greatest consideration from the Spanish Crown officials. The colonial officials were under obligation to show them the honor corresponding to their respective duties. They were allowed to sit in the houses of the Spanish provincial governors, and in any other places. They were not left to remain standing. It was not permitted for Spanish parish priests to treat these Filipino nobles with less consideration.

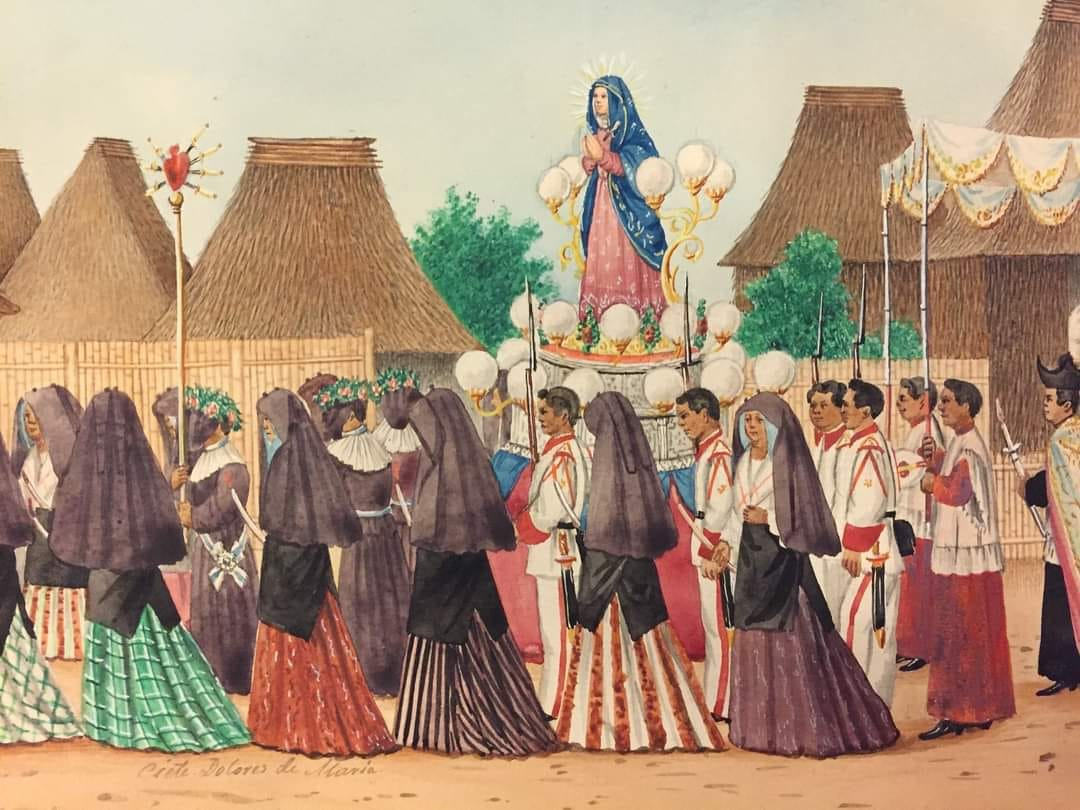
Mater Dolorosa santo (religious image) owned by a principalía family in a rural parish in the Philippines, being used during a Holy Week procession, c. 1870.

The gobernadorcillos exercised the command of the towns. They were port captains in coastal towns. They also had the rights and powers to elect assistants and several lieutenants and alguaciles, proportionate in number to the inhabitants of the town.

On the day on which the gobernadorcillo would take on government duties, his town would hold a grand celebration. A festive banquet would be offered in the municipal or city hall where he would occupy a seat, adorned by the coat of arms of Spain and with fanciful designs, if his social footing was of a respectable antiquity. (Note: The fanciful designs referred to by Blair and Robertson hint of the existence of some family symbols of the Datu Class, which existed before the Spanish conquest of the islands. Unfortunately, there has been no study of these symbols, which might be equivalent to what heraldry is in western countries.)

On holy days the town officials would go to the church, together in one group. The principalía and cuadrilleros (police patrol or assistance) formed two lines in front of the gobernadorcillo. They would be preceded by a band playing the music as they process towards the church, where the gobernadorcillo would occupy a seat in precedence among those of the chiefs or cabezas de barangay, who had benches of honor. After the mass, they would usually go to the parish rectory to pay their respects to the parish priest. Then, they would return to the tribunal (municipal hall or city hall) in the same order, and still accompanied by the band playing a loud double quick march called paso doble.

The gobernadorcillo was always accompanied by an alguacil or policia (police officer) whenever he went about the streets of his town.

==== Local nobility and the Laws of the Indies ====
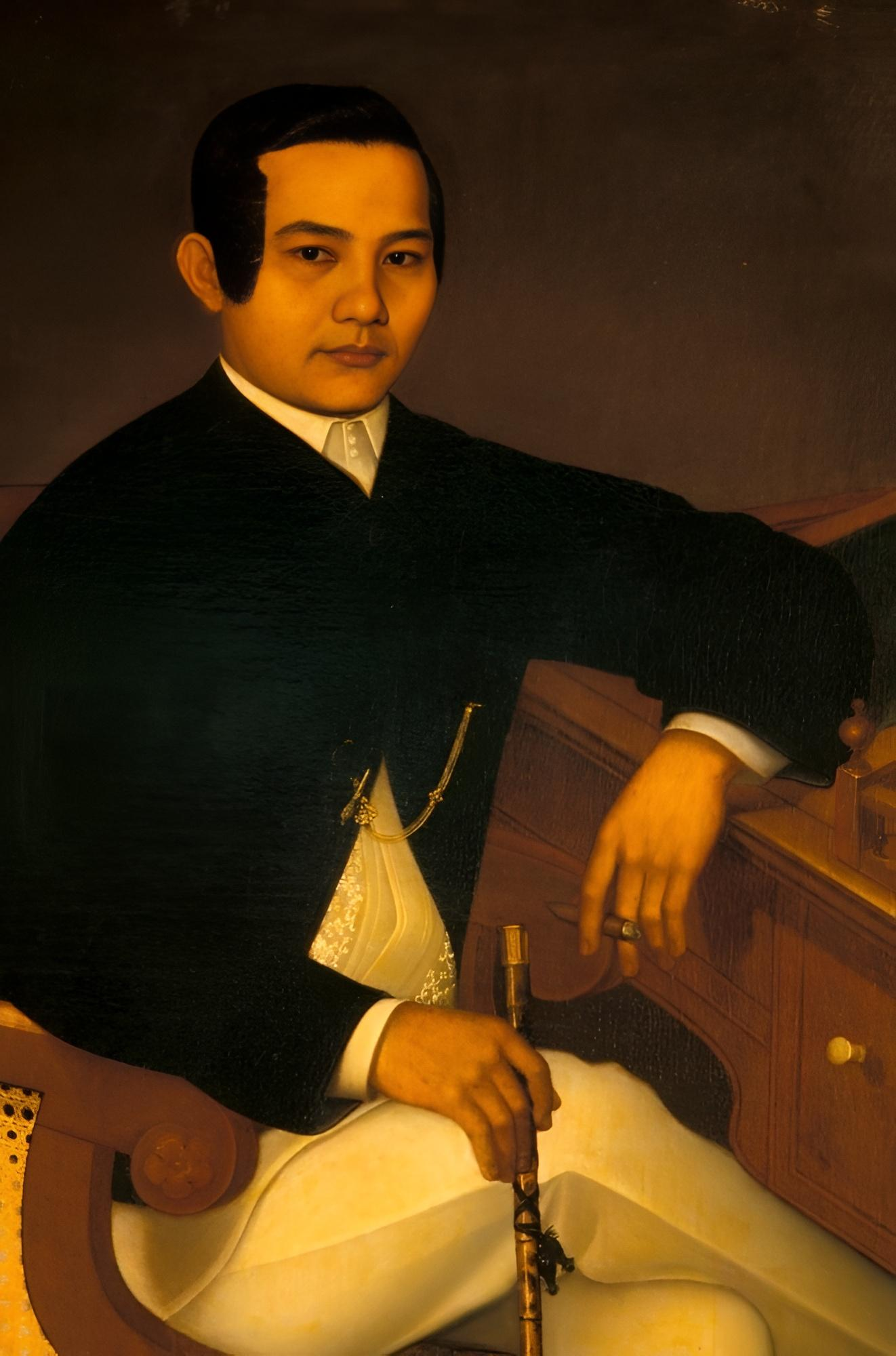
Portrait of a Principale from the 1800s

After conquering Manila and making it the capital of the colonial government in 1571, Miguel López de Legazpi noted that aside from the rulers of Cebu and of the capital, the other principales existing in the archipelago were either heads or datus of the barangays allied as nations; or tyrants, who were respected only by the law of the strongest. From this system of the law of the strongest sprung internal wars with which certain dominions annihilate one another. Attentive to these existing systems of government without stripping these ancient sovereigns of their legitimate rights, Legazpi demanded from these local rulers vassalage to the Spanish Crown. On June 11, 1594, shortly before confirming Legazpi's erection of Manila as a city on June 24 of the same year, King Philip II issued a royal decree institutionalizing the recognition of the rights and privileges of the local ruling class of the Philippines, which was later included in the codification of the Recopilación de las leyes de los reynos de Las Indias. (Note: 2= Y a la Ley 16, instituida por Felipe II el 11 de junio de 1594 -a similitud de las anteriores-, con la finalidad de que los indios principales de las islas Filipinas fuesen bien tratados y se les encargase alguna tarea de gobierno. Igualmente, esta disposición hacía extensible a los caciques filipinos toda la doctrina vigente en relación con los caciques indianos.)

In Book VI, Title VII (dedicated to the caciques) of the Recopilación de las leyes de los reynos de Las Indias (Laws of the Indies), there are three very interesting laws insofar as they determined the role that the caciques were to play in the Indian new social order under the colonial rule. With these laws, the Spanish Crown officially recognized the rights of these principales of pre-Hispanic origin. Specifically, Laws 1, 2 (dedicated to American territories) and; Law 16, instituted by Philip II, on June 11, 1594, which is similar to the previous two, with the main purpose of assuring that the principales of the Philippines would be treated well and be entrusted with some government charge. Likewise, this provision extended to the Filipino caciques all policies concerning the Indian caciques under the Spanish rule. (Note: En el Título VII, del Libro VI, de la Recopilación de las leyes de los reynos de Las Indias, dedicado a los caciques, podemos encontrar tres leyes muy interesantes en tanto en cuanto determinaron el papel que los caciques iban a desempeñar en el nuevo ordenamiento social indiano. Con ellas, la Corona reconocía oficialmente los derechos de origen prehispánico de estos principales. Concretamente, nos estamos refiriendo a las Leyes 1, 2, dedicadas al espacio americano . Y a la Ley 16, instituida por Felipe II el 11 de junio de 1594 -a similitud de las anteriores-, con la finalidad de que los indios principales de las islas Filipinas fuesen bien tratados y se les encargase alguna tarea de gobierno. Igualmente, esta disposición hacía extensible a los caciques filipinos toda la doctrina vigente en relación con los caciques indianos...Los principales pasaron así a formar parte del sistema político-administrativo indiano, sirviendo de nexo de unión entre las autoridades españolas y la población indígena. Para una mejor administración de la precitada población, se crearon los «pueblos de indios» -donde se redujo a la anteriormente dispersa población aborigen-.)

To implement a system of indirect rule in the Philippines, King Philip II ordered, through this law of June 11, 1594, that the honors and privileges of governing, which were previously enjoyed by the local royalty and nobility in formerly sovereign principalities who later accepted the Catholic faith and became subject to him, should be retained and protected. He also ordered the Spanish governors in the Philippines to treat these native nobles well. The king further ordered that the natives should pay to these nobles the same respect that the inhabitants accorded to their local lords before the conquest without prejudice to the things that pertain to the king himself or to the encomenderos.

The royal decree says: "It is not right that the Indian chiefs of Filipinas be in a worse condition after conversion; rather they should have such treatment that would gain their affection and keep them loyal, so that with the spiritual blessings that God has communicated to them by calling them to His true knowledge, the temporal blessings may be added, and they may live contentedly and comfortably. Therefore, we order the governors of those islands to show them good treatment and entrust them, in our name, with the government of the Indians, of whom they were formerly lords. In all else the governors shall see that the chiefs are benefited justly, and the Indians shall pay them something as a recognition, as they did during the period of their paganism, provided this is without prejudice to the tributes that are to be paid us, or to that which pertains to their encomenderos."

Through this law, the local Filipino nobles (under the supervision of the Spanish colonial officials) became encomenderos (trustees) also of the king of Spain, who ruled the country indirectly through these nobles. Corollary to this provision, all existing doctrines and laws regarding the Indian caciques were extended to Filipino principales. (Note: 2= Y a la Ley 16, instituida por Felipe II el 11 de junio de 1594 -a similitud de las anteriores-, con la finalidad de que los indios principales de las islas Filipinas fuesen bien tratados y se les encargase alguna tarea de gobierno. Igualmente, esta disposición hacía extensible a los caciques filipinos toda la doctrina vigente en relación con los caciques indianos.) Their domains became self‑ruled tributary barangays of the Spanish Empire.

The system of indirect government helped in the pacification of the rural areas, and institutionalized the rule and role of an upper class, referred to as the "principalía" or the "principales", until the fall of the Spanish regime in the Philippines in 1898.

The Spanish dominion brought serious modifications to the life and economy of the indigenous society. The shift of emphasis to agriculture marginalized, weakened, and deprived the hildalgo‑like warriors of their significance in the barangays, especially in the trade‑raiding societies in the Visayas (which needed the Viking‑like services of the "timawas"). By the 1580s, many of these noblemen found themselves reduced to leasing land from their datus. Their military functions were eclipsed by farming. Whatever remained would quickly be disoriented, deflected, and destroyed by the superior military power of Spain.

By the end of the 16th century, any claim to Filipino royalty, nobility or hidalguía had disappeared into a homogenized, Hispanicized and Christianized nobility – the principalía. This remnant of the pre‑colonial royal and noble families continued to rule their traditional domain until the end of the Spanish regime. However, there were cases when succession in leadership was also done through election of new leaders (cabezas de barangay), especially in provinces near the Manila where the ancient ruling families lost their prestige and role. It appears that proximity to the seat of colonial government diminished their power and significance. In distant territories, where the central authority had less control and where order could be maintained without using coercive measures, hereditary succession was still enforced, until Spain lost the archipelago to the Americans. These distant territories remained patriarchal societies, where people retained great respect for the principalía. (Note: Esta institucion (Cabecería de Barangay), mucho más antigua que la sujecion de las islas al Gobierno, ha merecido siempre las mayores atencion. En un principio eran las cabecerías hereditarias, y constituian la verdadera hidalguía del país; mas del dia, si bien en algunas provincias todavía se tramiten por sucesion hereditaria, las hay tambien eleccion, particularmente en las provincias más inmediatas á Manila, en donde han perdido su prestigio y son una verdadera carga. En las provincias distantes todavía se hacen respetar, y allí es precisamente en donde la autoridad tiene ménos que hacer, y el órden se conserva sin necesidad de medidas coercitivas; porque todavía existe en ellas el gobierno patriarcal, por el gran respeto que la plebe conserva aún á lo que llaman aquí principalía.)

==== Emergence of the mestizo class ====
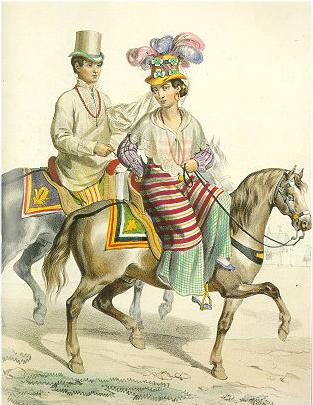
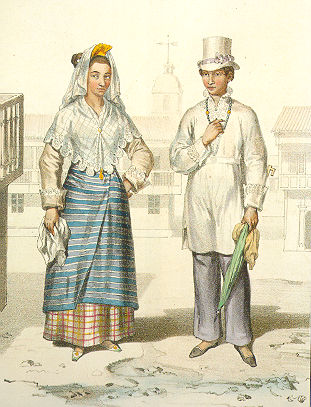
Left to right: [1] French illustration of a Spanish Filipino mestizo couple c. 1846; [2] Chinese mestizo couple c.1846.

The principalía was larger and more influential than the pre‑conquest indigenous nobility. It helped create and perpetuate an oligarchic system in the Spanish colony for more than three hundred years, serving as a link between the Spanish authorities and the local inhabitants.

The Spanish colonial government's prohibition for foreigners to own land in the Philippines contributed to the evolution of this form of oligarchy. In some provinces of the Philippines, many Spaniards and foreign merchants intermarried with the rich and landed local nobilities. From these unions, a new cultural group was formed, the mestizo class. (Note: also v.encomienda; hacienda) Their descendants emerged later to become an influential part of the government, and of the principalía.

The increase of population in the archipelago, as well as the growing presence of Chinese and mestizos also brought about social changes that necessitated the creation of new members of the principalía for these sectors of Filipino colonial society. (Note: (The creation of new principales, i.e., cabezas de barangay, was done by the Superintendent of Finance in cases of those towns near Manila. For those in distant provinces, the alcaldes named the new leader, proposed by the gobernadorcillo of the town where the barangay is located. The candidate proposed by the gobernadorcillo is the person presented by the members of the barangay.)) In this regard, pertinent laws were promulgated, such as the above-mentioned royal decree issued on December 20, 1863 (signed in the name of Queen Isabella II by the minister of the colonies, José de la Concha), which indicate certain conditions for promotion to the principalía class, among others, the capacity to speak the Castilian language. (Note: Article 16 of the Royal Decree of December 20, 1863, says: After a school has been established in any village for fifteen years, no natives who cannot speak, read and write the Castilian language shall form part of the principalía unless they enjoy that distinction by right of inheritance. After the school has been established for thirty years, only those who possess the above‑mentioned condition shall enjoy exemption from the personal service tax, except in the case of the sick. Isabel II) (Note: The royal decree was implemented in the Philippines by the Governor‑General through a circular signed on August 30, 1867. Section III of the circular says: The law has considered them very carefully and it is fitting for the supervisor to unfold before the eyes of the parents so that their simple intelligence may well understand that not only ought they, but that it is profitable for them to send their children to school, for after the schools have been established for fifteen years in the village of their tribes those who cannot speak, read, or write Castilian: cannot be gobernadorcillos; nor lieutenants of justice; nor form part of the principalía; unless they enjoy that privilege because of heredity... General Gándara, Circular of the Superior Civil Government Giving Rules for the Good Discharge of School Supervision) The reform also paved way to the creation of authorities among the Chinese guilds in enclaves of big settlements like Manila, on condition that these leaders were Christianized. (Note: Los chinos forman grémio en Manila regido por autoridades de su seno á condicion de ser cristianos.) Furthermore, Chinese gobernadorcillos were not given jurisdiction over municipal districts. Their jurisdiction was exceptional and they only exercised this over persons belonging to their guilds. (Note: Los Gobernadorcillos de chinos no tiene distrito municipal. Su jurisdiccion es privilegiada ó escepcional y solo la ejerce sobre los individuos del grémio...)

==== Royal Cedula of Charles II ====
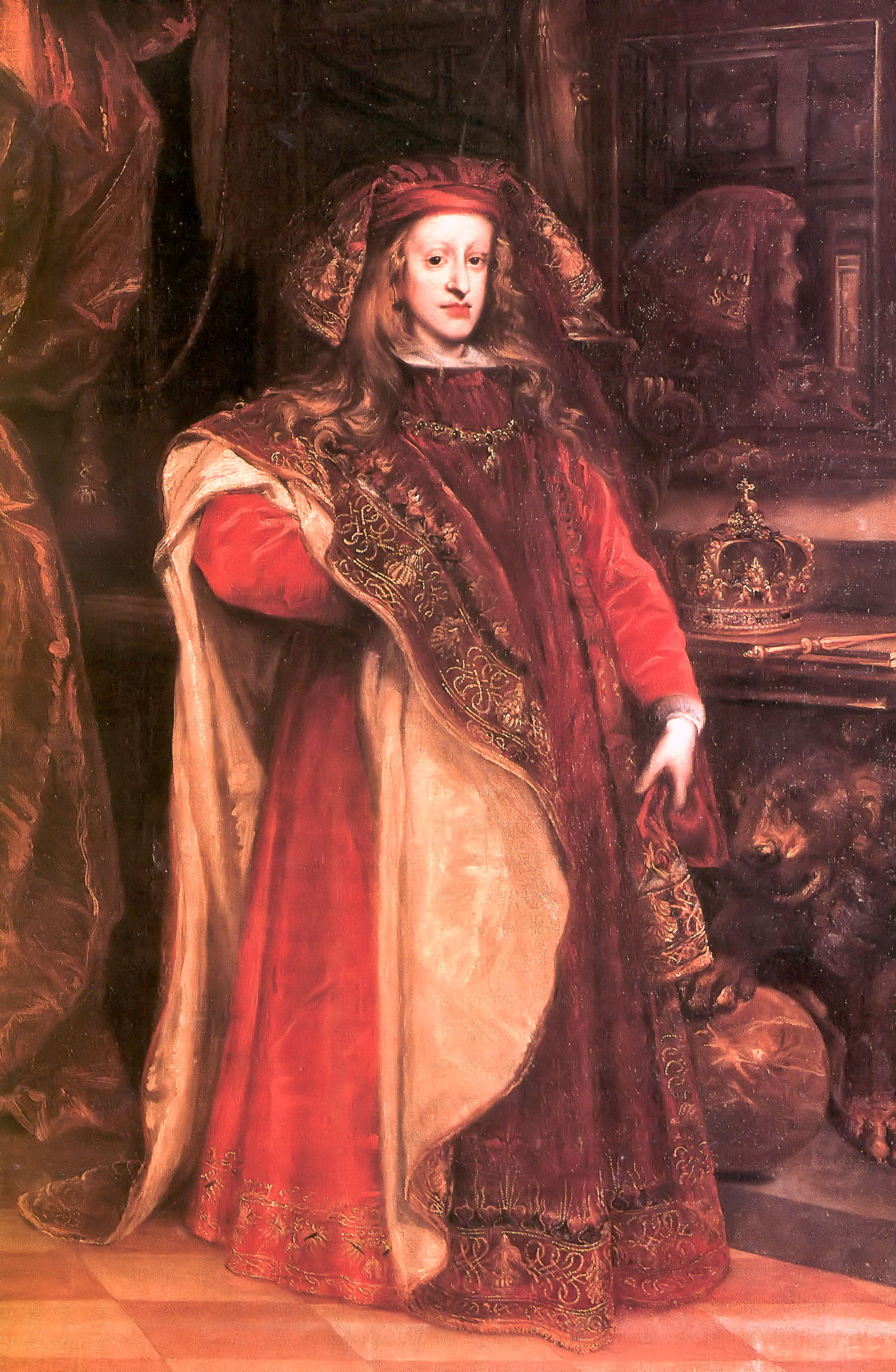
Charles wearing the robes of the Order of the Golden Fleece, in about 1673, by Juan Carreño de Miranda

The emergence of the mestizo class was a social phenomenon not localized in the Philippines, but was also very much present in the American continent. On March 22, 1697, Charles II of Spain issued a royal cedula, related to this phenomenon. The cedula gave distinctions to classes of persons in the social structure of the Crown colonies, and defined the rights and privileges of colonial functionaries. In doing so, the Spanish monarch touched another aspect of the colonial society, i.e., the status of indigenous nobles, extending to these indigenous nobles, as well as to their descendants, the preeminence and honors customarily attributed to the hidalgos of Castile. The royal cedula stipulates:

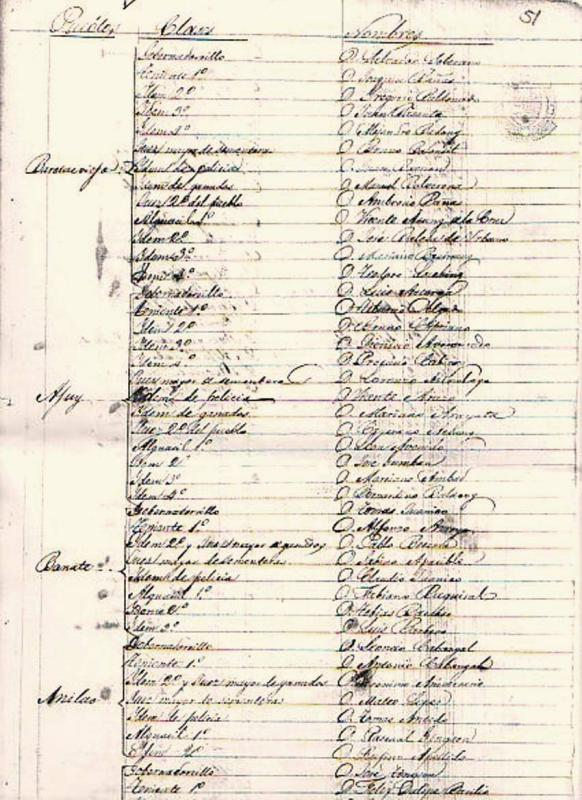
An 1855 municipal election report in the towns of Banate, Ajuy, Barotac Viejo and Anilao, Iloilo, which the principales exclusively participated in.

"Bearing in mind the laws and orders issued by my Progenies, Their Majesties the Kings, and by myself, I order the good treatment, assistance, protection and defense of the native Indians of America, that they may be taken cared of, maintained, privileged and honored like all other vassals of my Crown and that, in the course of time, the trial and use of them stops. I feel that its timely implementation is very suitable for public good, for the benefit of the Indians and for the service of God and mine. That, consequently, with respect to the Indian mestizos, the Archbishops and Bishops of the Indias are charged by Article 7, Title VII, Book I of the Laws of the Indies, for ordaining priests, being attentive to the qualities and circumstances present, and if some mestizas ask to be religious, they (Bishops) shall give support to those whom they admit in monasteries and for vows. But in particular, with regard to the requirements for Indians in order to accede to ecclesiastical or secular, governmental, political and military positions, which all require purity of blood and, by its Statute, the condition of nobility, there is distinction between the Indians and mestizos, inasmuch as there is between the [1] descendants of the notable Indians called caciques, and [2] those who are issues of less notable Indian tributaries, who in their pagan state acknowledged vassalage. It is deemed that all preeminence and honors, customarily conferred on the Hijosdalgos of Castile, are to be attributed to the first and to their descendants, both ecclesiastical and secular; and that they can participate in any communities which, by their statutes require nobility; for it is established that these, in their heathenism, were nobles to whom their subordinates acknowledged vassalage and to whom tributes were paid. Such kind of nobility is still retained and acknowledged, keeping these as well as their privileges wherever possible, as recognized and declared by the whole section on the caciques, which is Title VII, Book VI of the Laws of the Indies, wherein for the sake of distinction, the subordinate Indians were placed under (these noble's) dominion called «cacicazgo», transmissible from elder to elder, to their posteriority..." (Note: Por cuanto teniendo presentes las leyes y cédulas que se mandaron despachar por los Señores Reyes mis progenitores y por mí, encargo el buen tratamiento, amparo, protección y defensa de los indios naturales de la América, y que sean atendidos, mantenidos, favorecidos y honrados como todos los demás vasallos de mi Corona, y que por el trascurso del tiempo se detiene la práctica y uso de ellas, y siento tan conveniente su puntual cumplimiento al bien público y utilidad de los Indios y al servicio de Dios y mío, y que en esta consecuencia por lo que toca a los indios mestizos está encargo a los Arzobispos y Obispos de las Indias, por la Ley Siete, Título Siete, del Libro Primero, de la Recopilación, los ordenen de sacerdotes, concurriendo las calidades y circunstancias que en ella se disponen y que si algunas mestizas quisieren ser religiosas dispongan el que se las admita en los monasterios y a las profesiones, y aunque en lo especial de que quedan ascender los indios a puestos eclesiásticos o seculares, gubernativos, políticos y de guerra, que todos piden limpieza de sangre y por estatuto la calidad de nobles, hay distinción entre los Indios y mestizos, o como descendentes de los indios principales que se llaman caciques, o como procedidos de indios menos principales que son los tributarios, y que en su gentilidad reconocieron vasallaje, se considera que a los primeros y sus descendentes se les deben todas las preeminencias y honores, así en lo eclesiástico como en lo secular que se acostumbran conferir a los nobles Hijosdalgo de Castilla y pueden participar de cualesquier comunidades que por estatuto pidan nobleza, pues es constante que estos en su gentilismo eran nobles a quienes sus inferiores reconocían vasallaje y tributaban, cuya especie de nobleza todavía se les conserva y considera, guardándoles en lo posible, o privilegios, como así se reconoce y declara por todo el Título de los caciques, que es el Siete, del Libro Seis, de la Recopilación, donde por distinción de los indios inferiores se les dejó el señorío con nombre de cacicazgo, transmisible de mayor en mayor, a sus posterioridades...)

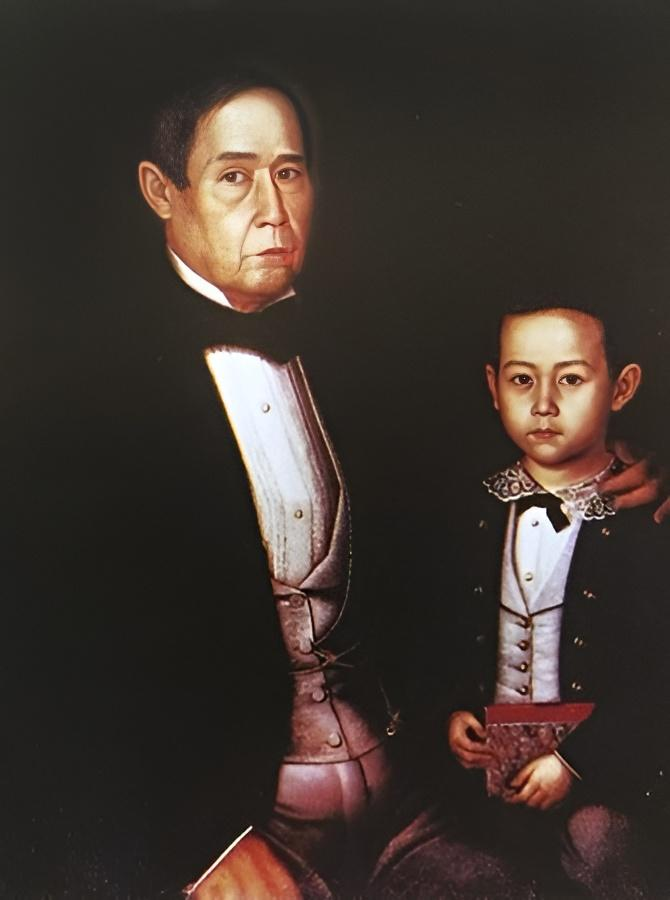
Principalia Don Narciso Padilla lawyer, merchant, shipowner, and regidor of the Royal Audencia of the Philippines and his grandson, the future great painter Félix Resurrección Hidalgo at four years old

The royal cedula was enforced in the Philippines and benefited many indigenous nobles. It can be seen very clearly and irrefutably that, during the colonial period, indigenous chiefs were equated with the Spanish hidalgos, and the most resounding proof of the application of this comparison is the General Military Archive in Segovia, where the qualifications of "nobility" (found in the Service Records) are attributed to those Filipinos who were admitted to the Spanish military academies and whose ancestors were caciques, encomenderos, notable Tagalogs, chieftains, governors or those who held positions in the municipal administration or government in all different regions of the large islands of the archipelago, or of the many small islands of which it is composed. (Note: Por ella se aprecia bien claramente y de manera fehaciente que a los caciques indígenas se les equiparada a los Hidalgos españoles y la prueba más rotunda de su aplicación se halla en el Archivo General Militar de Segovia, en donde las calificaciones de «Nobleza» se encuentran en las Hojas de Servicio de aquellos filipinos que ingresaron en nuestras Academias Militares y cuyos ascendientes eran caciques, encomenderos, tagalos notables, pedáneos, por los gobernadores o que ocupan cargos en la Administración municipal o en la del Gobierno, de todas las diferentes regiones de las grandes islas del Archipiélago o en las múltiples islas pequeñas de que se compone el mismo.) In the context of the ancient tradition and norms of Castilian nobility, all descendants of a noble are considered noble, regardless of fortune.

At the Real Academia de la Historia ('Royal Academy of History') in Spain, there is also a substantial amount of records giving reference to the Philippine Islands, and while most part corresponds to the history of these islands, the academia did not exclude among its documents the presence of many genealogical records. The archives of the academia and its royal stamp recognized the appointments of hundreds of natives of the Philippines who, by virtue of their social position, occupied posts in the administration of the territories and were classified as "nobles". (Note: Por otra parte, mientras en las Indias la cultura precolombiana había alcanzado un alto nivel, en Filipinas la civilización isleña continuaba manifestándose en sus estados más primitivos. Sin embargo, esas sociedades primitivas, independientes totalmente las unas de las otras, estaban en cierta manera estructuradas y se apreciaba en ellas una organización jerárquica embrionaria y local, pero era digna de ser atendida. Precisamente en esa organización local es, como siempre, de donde nace la nobleza. El indio aborigen, jefe de tribu, es reconocido como noble y las pruebas irrefutables de su nobleza se encuentran principalmente en las Hojas de Servicios de los militares de origen filipino que abrazaron la carrera de las Armas, cuando para hacerlo necesariamente era preciso demostrar el origen nobiliario del individuo.) The presence of these notables demonstrates the cultural concern of Spain in those Islands to prepare the natives and the collaboration of these in the government of the archipelago. This aspect of Spanish rule in the Philippines appears much more strongly implemented than in the Americas. Hence in the Philippines, the local nobility, by reason of charge accorded to their social class, acquired greater importance than in the Indies of the New World. (Note: También en la Real Academia de la Historia existe un importante fondo relativo a las Islas Filipinas, y aunque su mayor parte debe corresponder a la Historia de ellas, no es excluir que entre su documentación aparezcan muchos antecedentes genealógicos... El Archivo del Palacio y en su Real Estampilla se recogen los nombramientos de centenares de aborígenes de aquel Archipiélago, a los cuales, en virtud de su posición social, ocuparon cargos en la administración de aquellos territorios y cuya presencia demuestra la inquietud cultural de nuestra Patria en aquéllas Islas para la preparación de sus naturales y la colaboración de estos en las tareas de su Gobierno. Esta faceta en Filipinas aparece mucho más actuada que en el continente americano y de ahí que en Filipinas la Nobleza de cargo adquiera mayor importancia que en las Indias.)

== Class symbols ==
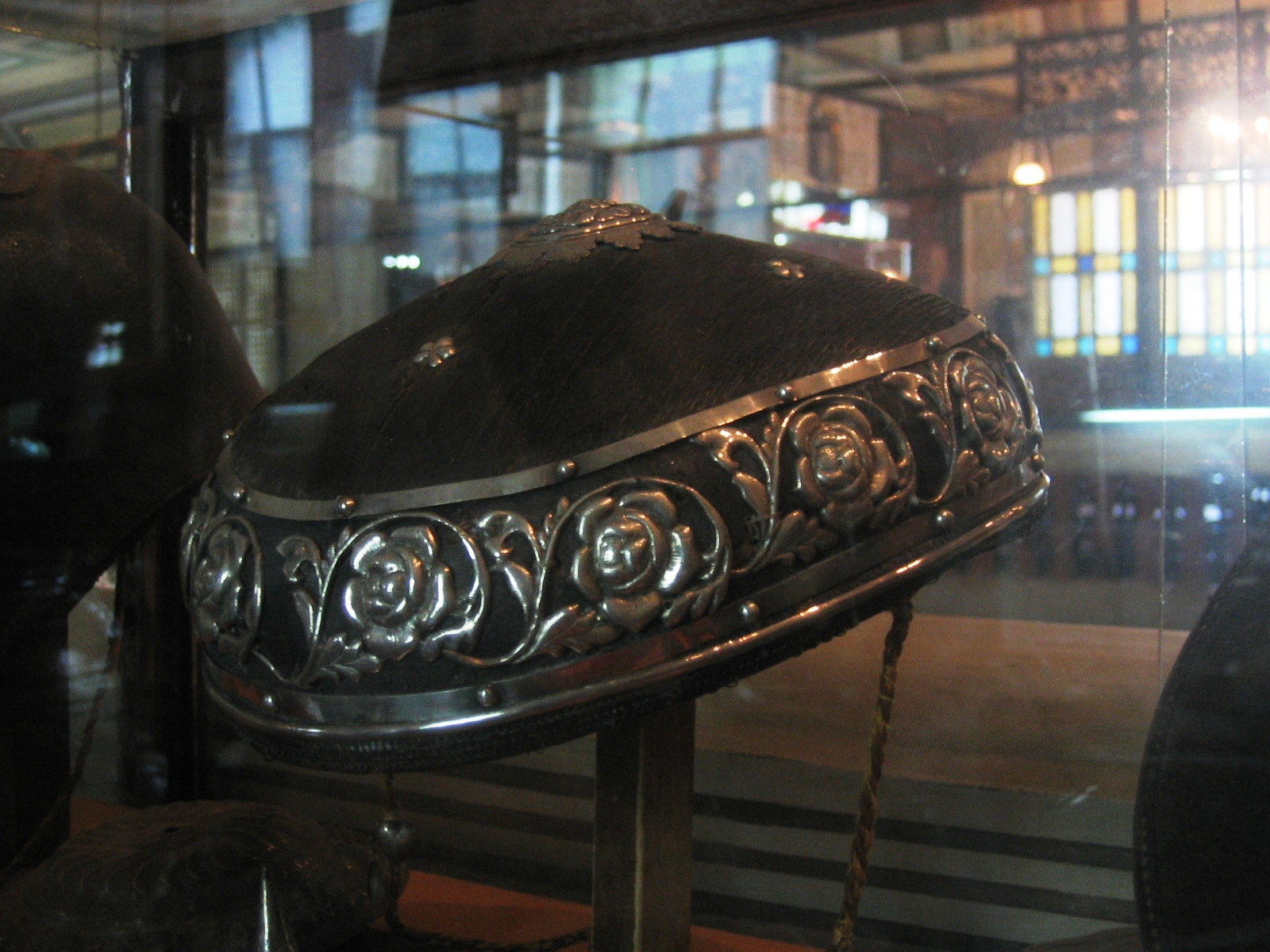
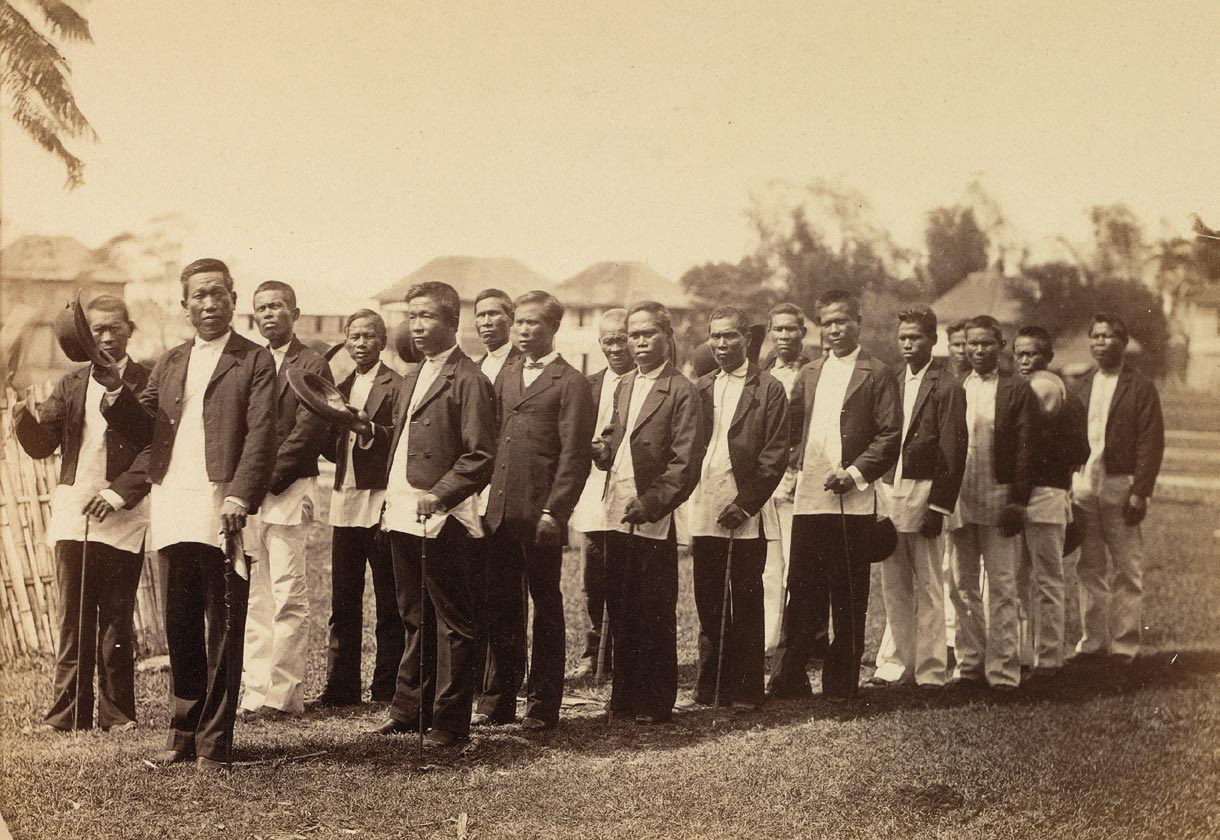
Left to right: [1] Silver‑inlaid salakot on display in Villa Escudero Museum, San Pablo, Laguna; [2] Native principales of Leganes, Iloilo c. 1880, in formal attire complete with their bastones and varas, and in marching formation, on a special occasion.

At the later part of the Spanish period, this class of elite Christian landowners started to adopt a characteristic style of dress and carry regalia. They wore a distinctive type of salakot, a Philippine headdress commonly used in the archipelago since the pre‑colonial period. Instead of the usual headgear made of rattan, of reeds called nitó, or of various shells such as capiz shells, which common Filipinos would wear, the principales would use more prized materials like tortoise shell. The special salakot of the ruling upper class was often adorned with ornate capping spike crafted in metals of value like silver, or, at times, gold. This headgear was usually embossed also with precious metals and sometimes decorated with silver coins or pendants that hung around the rim.

It was mentioned earlier that the royalties and nobilities of the pre-colonial societies in the Visayas, Northern Mindanao, and Luzon (Cebu, Bohol, Panay, Mindoro and Manila) also shared the many customs of royalties and nobles in Southeast Asian territories (with Hindu and Buddhist cultures), especially in the generous use of gold and silk in their costumes, as the Boxer Codex demonstrate. The measure of the prince's possession of gold and slaves was proportionate to his greatness and nobility. When the Spaniards reached the shores of the archipelago, they observed that there was hardly any "indian" who did not possess chains and other articles of gold.

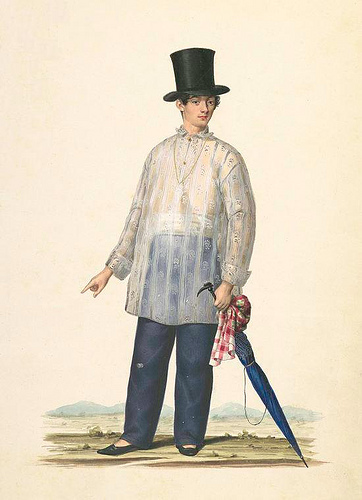
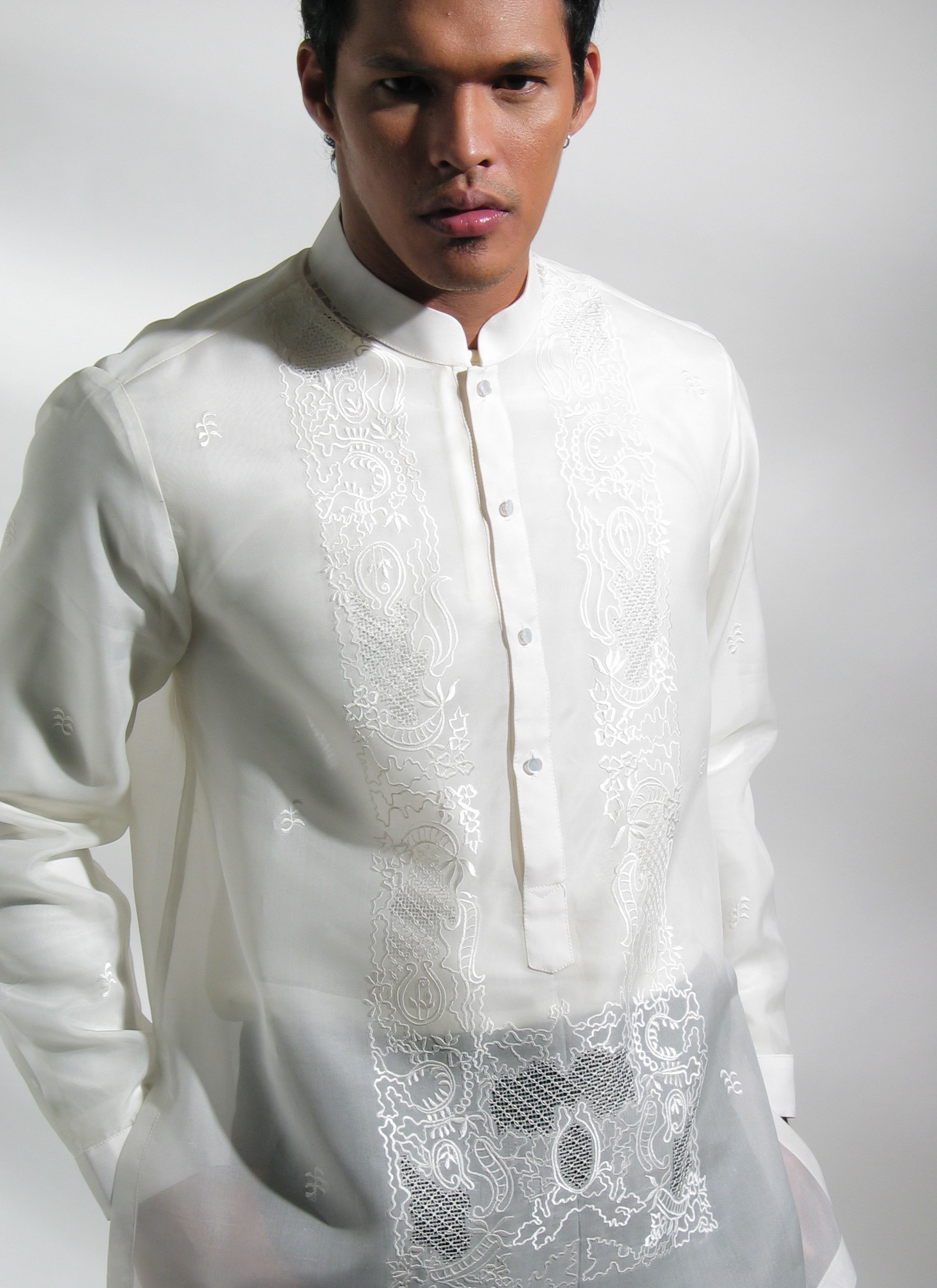
Left to right: [1] Illustration of a Spanish Filipino mestizo dressed in "barong tagalog" c. 1841; [2] The contemporary "barong tagalog" fashion;

However, this way of dressing was slowly changed as colonial power took firmer grips of the local nobilities and finally ruled the Islands. By the middle of the 19th century, the usual attire of the principalía consisted of a black jacket, European trousers, salakot, and colored (velvet) slippers. Many would even wear varnished shoes, such as high quality leather shoes. Their shirt was worn outside the trousers. Some sources claim that the Spaniards did not allow the native Filipinos to tuck their shirts under their waistbands, nor were they allowed to have any pockets. It is said that the intention of the colonizers was to remind the natives that they remain indios regardless of the wealth and power they attain. It is claimed that this was a way for discriminating the natives from their Spanish overlords. The locals also used native fabrics of transparent appearance. It is believed that transparent, sheer fabric were mainly for discouraging the indios from hiding any weapons under their shirts. However, the native nobles did not wish to be outdone in the appearance of their apparel. And so, they richly embroidered their shirts with somewhat baroque designs on delicate Piña fabric. This manner of sporting what originally was a European attire for men led the way to the development of the Barong, which later became the national costume for Filipino men.

Distinctive staffs of office were associated with the Filipino ruling class. The gobernadorcillo would carry a tasseled cane (baston) decorated with precious metals, while his lieutenants would use some kind of wands referred to as vara (rama). On occasions and ceremonies of greater solemnity, they would dress formally in frock coat and high crowned hat.

One distinctive status symbol of the principalía families of the rural pueblos, which remain handed down to their descendants until the present time, is the ownership of a santo or religious statue. Principalía families in provinces were mostly hacienderos, who had the means and manpower to maintain and decorate carrozas or floats of sacred images, which are often processed during various religious occasions, most importantly the town fiesta and Holy Week. Those who were endowed with more material possessions and power would own images with ivory heads and hands, and crowned with gold or silver halos. From the 17th to the 19th century, Spanish missionaries established a system of sponsorship for religious images. Those who sponsored santos were called "camareros". The prestige associated with being camareros influenced the contemporary trend among well-to-do Filipino Catholic families to sponsor carrozas for processions organized during various religious festivities in the country.

== Race and status ==
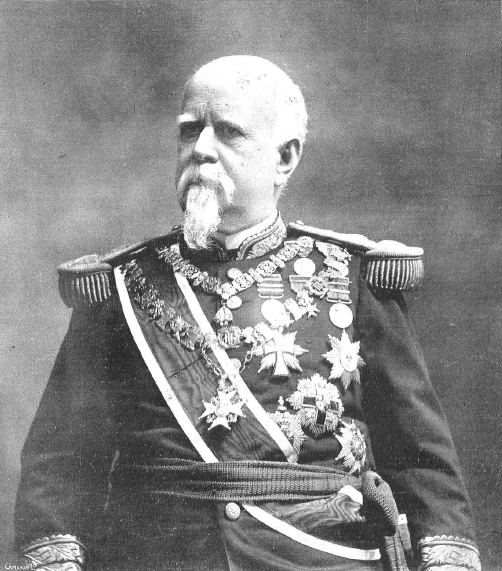
Marcelo Azcárraga Palmero, the only Spanish prime minister of Filipino descent.

Although the principalía had many privileges, there were limitations to how much power they were entitled to under Spanish rule. A member of the principalía could never become the governor‑general (gobernador y capitán general), nor could he become the provincial governor (alcalde mayor). Hypothetically, a member of the principalía could obtain the position of provincial governor if, for example, a noblewoman of the principalía married a Spanish man born in the Philippines (an Insular) of an elevated social rank. In which case her children would be classified as white (or blanco). However, this did not necessarily give a guarantee that her sons would obtain the position of provincial governor. Being mestizos was not an assurance that they would be loyal enough to the Spanish Crown. Such unquestionable allegiance was necessary for the colonizers in retaining control of the archipelago.

The children born of the union between the principales and the insulares, or better still, the peninsulares (a Spanish person born in Spain) are neither assured access to the highest position of power in the colony. Flexibility is known to have occurred in some cases, including that of Marcelo Azcárraga Palmero who even became interim prime minister of Spain on August 8, 1897, until October 4 of that same year. Azcárraga also went on to become Prime Minister of Spain again in two more separate terms of office. In 1904, he was granted knighthood in the very exclusive Spanish chilvalric Order of the Golden Fleece—the only mestizo recipient of this prestigious award.

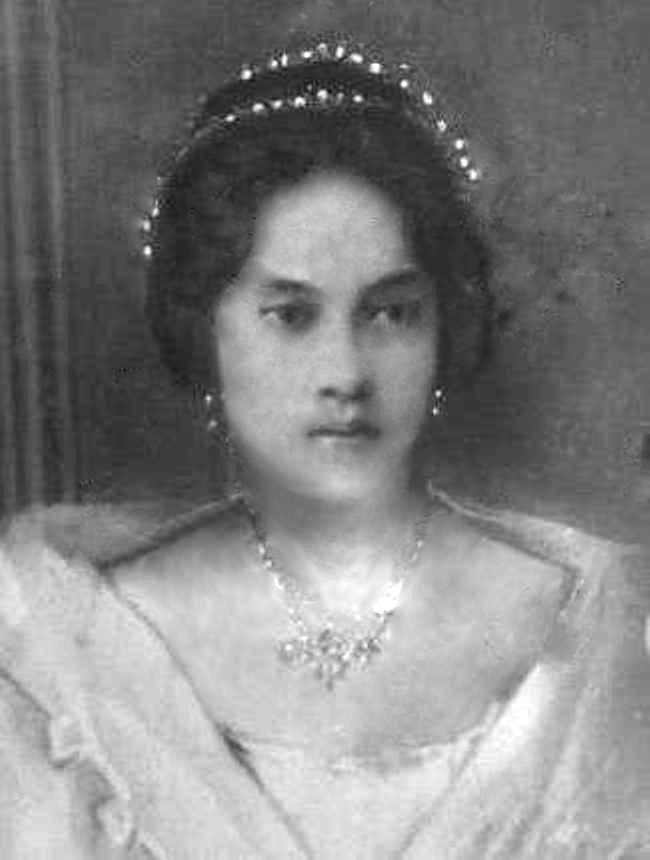
An Ilongga-Spanish mestiza (mixed‑race) woman belonging to the principalía.

In the archipelago, however, most often ethnic segregation did put a stop to social mobility, even for members of the principalía – a thing that is normally expected in a colonial rule. It was not also common for principales to be too ambitious so as to pursue very strong desire for obtaining the office of Governor-General. For most part, it appears that the local nobles were inclined to be preoccupied with matters concerning their barangays and towns.

The town mayors received an annual salary of 24 pesos, which was nothing in comparison to the provincial governor's 1,600 pesos and the Governor‑General's 40,000 pesos. Even though the salary of a gobernadorcillo was not subject to tax, it was not enough to carry out all the required duties expected of such a position. This explains why among the principales, those who had more wealth were likely to be elected to the office of gobernadorcillo (municipal governor).

Principales tend to marry those who belong to their class, to maintain wealth and power. However, unlike most European royalties who marry their close relatives, e.g. first cousins, for this purpose, Filipino nobles abhorred incestuous unions. In some cases, members of the principalia married wealthy and non‑noble Chinese (Sangley) merchants, who made their fortune in the colony. Principales born of these unions had possibilities to be elected gobernadorcillo by their peers.

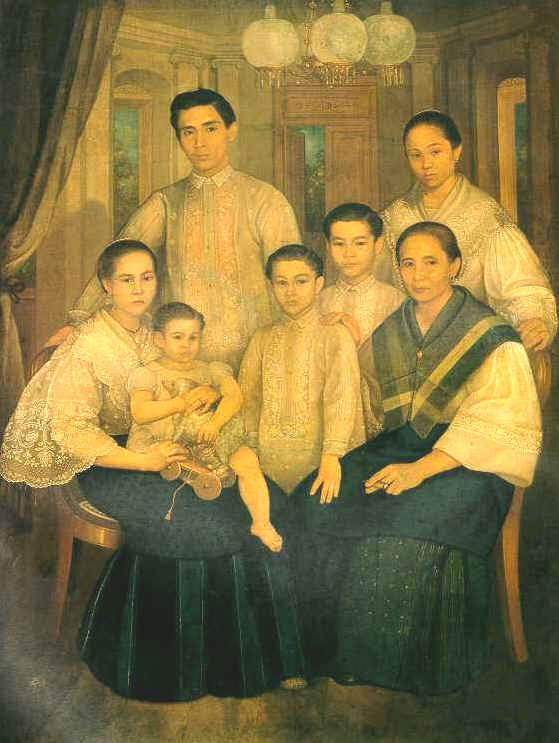
Portrait of a Filipino Chinese family, c. 1880.

Wealth was not the only basis for inter‑marriage between the principales and foreigners, which were commonly prearranged by parents of the bride and groom. Neither did having a Spaniard as one of the parents of a child ennobles him. In a traditionally conservative Catholic environment with Christian mores and norms strictly imposed under the tutelage and prying eyes of Spanish friars, marriage to a divorcée or secondhand spouse (locally referred to as "tirá ng ibá", literally "others' leftovers") was scornfully disdained by Filipino aristocrats. Virgin brides were a must for the principalía, as well as for the Filipinos in general. (Note: "The question of the validity of marriages performed by other persons than the parish priests has been much discussed in the Philippines. There have been many marriages of American citizens between themselves and of Americans to Spanish and Filipino women. The subject is of vast importance, involving, as it does, the legitimacy of issue and the validity of marriage. The law of marriage in the Philippines is a canonical law and nothing else. When a man wishes to get married he goes to the parish priest and the parish priest examines the woman and finds out whether she wishes to marry the man and what her race is – whether Spanish, Mestizo, Chinese, or any other – and then ascertains whether the fathers of both parties are willing that the marriage should be solemnized. The law which is in force in Spain and also in the Philippines in regard to marriages of natives, Spaniards, and Spanish half- castes, is that they can not marry without the consent of their parents or family unless they are 23 years of age; but this is not true in the case of Chinese Mestizos, who can marry at the age of 16 without the family's consent. This applies to both sexes. This privilege of the Mestizo Chinese, which was granted by the Pope had this object in view: The increase of this race, which is the race considered to be the most industrious. The priest then finds out if there is any impediment to the marriage and if he finds none he calls the banns openly in the church for three Sundays, and if no one makes any objection to the marriage the contractants are allowed to marry on the day following the third Sunday.")

Children who were born outside of marriage, even of Spaniards, were not accepted in the circle of principales. These were severely ostracized in the conservative colonial society and were pejoratively called an "anák sa labás", i.e., "child from outside" (viz., outside marriage), a stigma that still remains part of the contemporary social mores.

During the last years of the regime, there were efforts to push for a representation of the archipelago in the Spanish Cortes among a good number of principales. This move was prevalent especially among those who have studied in Spain and other parts of Europe (ilustrados). That initiative, however, was met with snobbery by the colonizers, who denied the natives of equal treatment, in any way possible.

Towards the end of the 19th century, civil unrest occurred more frequently. This situation was exposed by the writer and leader of the Propaganda Movement, José Rizal, in his two novels: Noli Me Tángere, and El Filibusterismo (dedicated to the three Filipino Catholic priests, who were executed on February 17, 1872, by Spanish colonial authorities, on charges of subversion arising from the 1872 Cavite mutiny). Because of this growing unrest that turned into an irreversible revolution, the position of provincial governor became awarded more and more often to the peninsulares. In the ecclesiastical sector, a decree was made, stating there were to be no further appointments of Filipinos as parish priests.

== Status quaestionis ==
Heraldic Crown of Hispanic Hidalgos.

The recognition of the rights and privileges of the Filipino principalía as equivalent to those of the hidalgos of Castile appears to facilitate entrance of Filipino nobles into institutions under the Spanish Crown, either civil or religious, which required proofs of nobility. However, such approximation may not be entirely correct since in reality, although the principales were vassals of the Spanish Crown, their rights as sovereign in their former dominions were guaranteed by the Laws of the Indies, more particularly the royal decree of Philip II of 11 June 1594, which Charles II confirmed for the purpose stated above, to satisfy the requirements of the existing laws in the peninsula. (Note: Por cuanto teniendo presentes las leyes y cédulas que se mandaron despachar por los Señores Reyes mis progenitores y por mí, encargo el buen tratamiento, amparo, protección y defensa de los indios naturales de la América, y que sean atendidos, mantenidos, favorecidos y honrados como todos los demás vasallos de mi Corona, y que por el trascurso del tiempo se detiene la práctica y uso de ellas, y siento tan conveniente su puntual cumplimiento al bien público y utilidad de los Indios y al servicio de Dios y mío, y que en esta consecuencia por lo que toca a los indios mestizos está encargo a los Arzobispos y Obispos de las Indias, por la Ley Siete, Título Siete, del Libro Primero, de la Recopilación, los ordenen de sacerdotes, concurriendo las calidades y circunstancias que en ella se disponen y que si algunas mestizas quisieren ser religiosas dispongan el que se las admita en los monasterios y a las profesiones, y aunque en lo especial de que quedan ascender los indios a puestos eclesiásticos o seculares, gubernativos, políticos y de guerra, que todos piden limpieza de sangre y por estatuto la calidad de nobles, hay distinción entre los Indios y mestizos, o como descendentes de los indios principales que se llaman caciques, o como procedidos de indios menos principales que son los tributarios, y que en su gentilidad reconocieron vasallaje, se considera que a los primeros y sus descendentes se les deben todas las preeminencias y honores, así en lo eclesiástico como en lo secular que se acostumbran conferir a los nobles Hijosdalgo de Castilla y pueden participar de cualesquier comunidades que por estatuto pidan nobleza, pues es constante que estos en su gentilismo eran nobles a quienes sus inferiores reconocían vasallaje y tributaban, cuya especie de nobleza todavía se les conserva y considera, guardándoles en lo posible, o privilegios, como así se reconoce y declara por todo el Título de los caciques, que es el Siete, del Libro Seis, de la Recopilación, donde por distinción de los indios inferiores se les dejó el señorío con nombre de cacicazgo, transmisible de mayor en mayor, a sus posterioridades...)

From the beginning of the Spanish colonial period, Miguel López de Legazpi retained the hereditary rights of the local ancient sovereigns of the archipelago who vowed allegiance to the Spanish Crown. Many of them accepted the Catholic religion and became Spanish allies at this time. He only demanded from these local rulers vassalage to the Spanish Crown, (Note: "En las Visayas ayudaba siempre a los amigos, y sujetaba solamente con las armas a los que los ofendian, y aun despues de subyugados no les exigia mas que un reconocimiento en especie, a que se obligan. " English translation: "In the Visayas [Legaspi] always helped friends, and wield weapons only against those who offended them (his friends), and even after he subjugated them (those who offended his friends), he did not demand more than some kind of acknowledgment from those whom he conquered.") replacing the similar overlordship, which previously existed in a few cases, e.g., Sultanate of Brunei's overlordship of the Kingdom of Maynila. Other independent polities, which were not vassals to other states, e.g., the Confederation of Madja-as and the Rajahnate of Cebu, were de facto protectorates/suzerainties having had alliances with the Spanish Crown before the kingdom took total control of most parts of the archipelago.

A question remains after the cessession of Spanish rule in the Philippines regarding any remaining rank equivalency of Filipino principalía. Reassuming their ancestral titles as datus while retaining the hidalgos of Castile (their former protector state), as subsidiary title, is the logical consequence of the above-mentioned recognition by Charles II of Spain. As guaranteed by this Spanish monarch's royal decree, the ancient nobility of the casiques within his realm (which includes the Filipino principales) "is still retained and acknowledged".

Besides, the principales retained many of the ordinary obligations of local rulers as manifested in constructing local infrastructures and in maintaining the government offices without funds from Spain. Expenditures of the local government came from the private and personal resources of the principales. These were not taxes that citizens were obliged to pay as tributes required by their Spanish Crown from its subjects. In many ways, the principales retained much of the responsibilities, powers and obligations of the pre-colonial datus – their predecessors, except for the right to organize their own armed forces. Only the right of gobernadorcillos to appoint alguacils and "cuadrilleros" (police patrol or assistance) seem to point out to some kind of vestige of this pre-colonial sign of the datu's coercive power and responsibility to defend his domain.

Like deposed royal families elsewhere in the world, which continue to claim hereditary rights as pretenders to the former thrones of their ancestors, the descendants of the principalía have similar claims to the historical domains of their forebears. Many were, however, able to integrate into the new socio-political structure, retaining some degree of influence and power.

== See also ==
- Filipino styles and honorifics
- Gobernadorcillo
- Cabeza de Barangay
- Precolonial barangay
- Datu
- Lakan
- Maginoo
- Maharlika
- Timawa
- Babaylan
- History of the Philippines (1521–1898)
- Confederation of Madja-as
- Maragtas
- Sultanate of Maguindanao
- Sultanate of Sulu
- List of political families in the Philippines
- Culture of the Philippines
- Cacique, equivalent in colonial Latin America
  - Caudillo, another type of strongman leader in colonial and postcolonial Latin America
- Priyayi, Javanese equivalent of the Dutch East Indies
