= Fernando González de la Cuesta =

Most Reverend Fernando González de la Cuesta
- Bishop-Elect of La Plata o Charcas
- Church: Catholic Church
- Diocese: Diocese of La Plata o Charcas
- In office: 1561
- Predecessor: Tomás de San Martín
- Successor: Domingo de Santo Tomás

Personal details
- Died: 24 September 1561

Fernando González de la Cuesta (died 1561) was a Roman Catholic prelate who served as Bishop-Elect of La Plata o Charcas (1561).

== Biography ==
On 25 Jun 1561, Fernando González de la Cuesta was appointed during the papacy of Pope Pius IV as Bishop of La Plata o Charcas. He died before his consecration as Bishop-Elect of La Plata o Charcas until his death on 24 Sep 1561.

== External links and additional sources ==
- Cheney, David M. "Archdiocese of Sucre". Catholic-Hierarchy.org. (for Chronology of Bishops) ^{[self-published]}
- Chow, Gabriel. "Metropolitan Archdiocese of Sucre (Bolivia)". GCatholic.org. (for Chronology of Bishops) ^{[self-published]}

Catholic Church titles
| Preceded by Tomás de San Martín | Bishop-Elect of La Plata o Charcas; 1561 | Succeeded by Domingo de Santo Tomás |
