= Hidalgo (nobility) =

Members of the Spanish and Portuguese nobility; a nobleman without a hereditary title

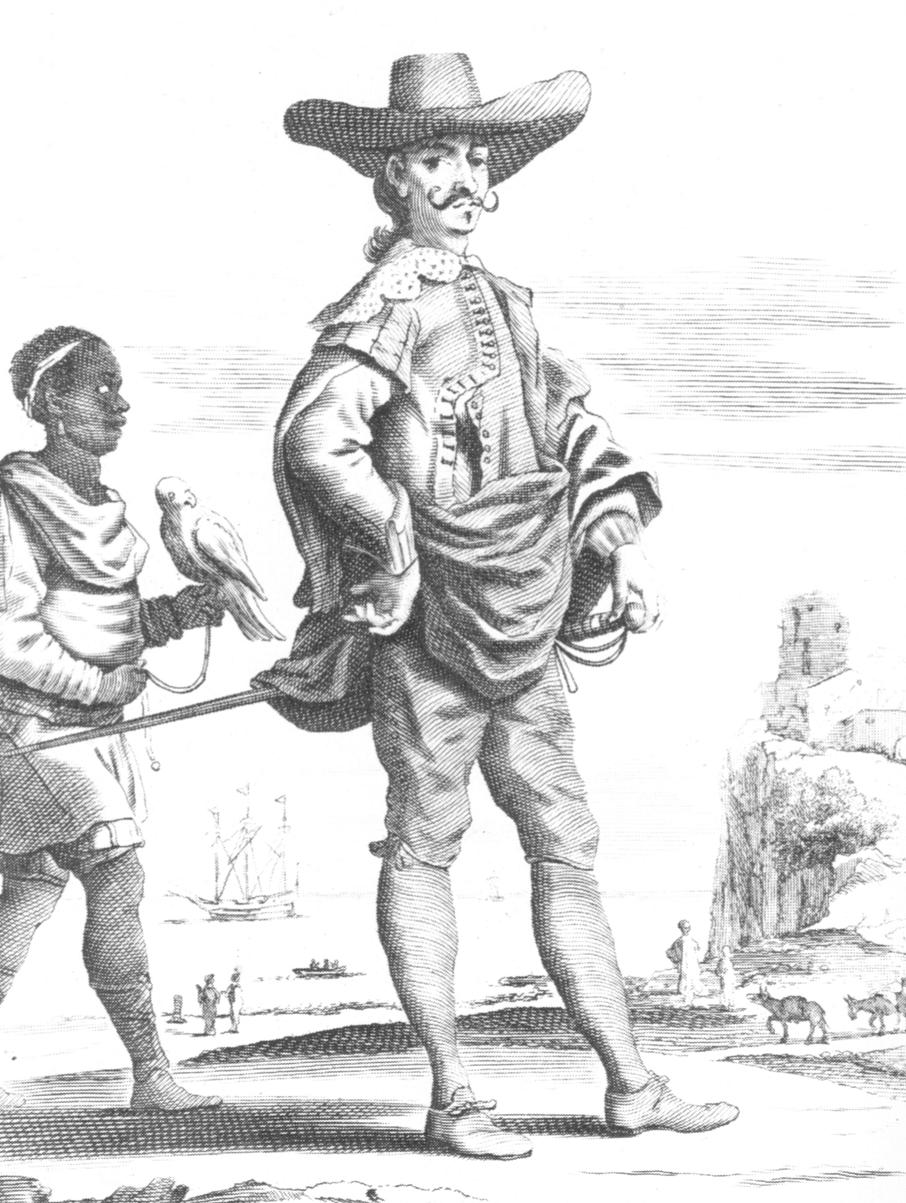
17th-century French illustration of a hidalgo in Spanish America with a Black servant

The heraldic crown of Spanish hidalgos

A hidalgo (/hɪˈdælɡoʊ/; Spanish: [iˈðalɣo]) is a hereditary member of the Spanish nobility, as opposed to someone who acquired his nobility by royal grace. Historically, hidalgos enjoyed important privileges, such as being exempt from paying taxes, having the right to bear arms, having a coat of arms, having a separate legal and court system whereby they could only be judged by their peers, not being subject to the death sentence unless it was authorized by the king, etc.

Contrary to popular belief, hidalguía (i.e. the condition of being a hidalgos) is not a nobility rank, but rather a type of nobility. Not all hidalgos lacked nobility titles, and not all members of the titled nobility were hidalgos. For example, the Kings of Spain are hidalgos, because their nobility is acquired by blood, but the 1st Marquess of Del Bosque would not be considered a conventional hidalgo because he was granted his title as a personal reward. In modern times, hidalgos enjoy no legal privilages although they are represented through various organizations, such as the Real Asociación de Hidalgos, the Real Cuerpo de la Nobleza de Madrid, and orders of chivalry.

== Etymology ==
From the twelfth century, the phrase fijo d'algo (lit. son of something) and its contraction, fidalgo, were used in the Kingdom of Castile and in the Kingdom of Portugal to identify a type of nobility. In Portugal, the cognate remained fidalgo, which identified nobles of a similar status to a hidalgo in Spain. The pronunciation changes in Spanish occurred during the late Middle Ages, the f- sound in the word-initial position developed into a h-sound, leading to the spelling of hidalgo (see History of the Spanish language) or “hijo-dalgo” in some formal contexts, etc.

In time, the term included the lower-ranking gentry, the untitled, lower stratum of the nobility who were still exempted from taxation. The Siete Partidas (Leyes de Partidas) suggests that the word hidalgo derives from itálico ("italic"), a man with full Roman citizenship.

In the previous Visigoth monarchies, the condition of the hidalgo was that of a freeman without land wealth, but with the nobleman's rights to bear arms and to be exempt from taxation, in compensation for military service; the military obligation and the social condition remained in force by the Fuero Juzgo law.

== Origins ==
The hidalguía has its origins in fighting men of the Reconquista.

By the tenth century, the term infanzón appears in Asturian-Leonese documents as a synonym for the Spanish and Medieval Latin terms caballero and miles (both, "knight"). This term was used through Iberia to refer to vassals of the great magnates and prelates and who ran their estates for them as petty nobility. In these first centuries it was still possible to become a miles simply by being able to provide, and afford the costs of, mounted military service.

Only by the mid-twelfth century did the ranks of the knights begin to be—in theory—closed by lineage. In the frontier towns that were created as the Christian kingdoms pushed into Muslim land, the infanzones, and not the magnates who often were far away, came to dominate politics, society and cultural patronage. From their ranks were also drawn the representatives of the towns and cities when the cortes were convened by kings. It was in the twelfth century that this class, along with the upper nobility, began to be called hidalgos, refering to their status as the "son of something" (the infanzones).

In the Kingdom of Aragón, the term infanzón contuined to refer to the hereditary noble class. The term hidalgo largely replaced infanzón in the Kingdom of Castile. In 1707, King Phillip V issued the Nueva Planta decrees, legally incorporating all the Spanish kingdoms into the Crown of Castile. The term infanzón began to disappear from legal records afterwards, although it was still used unofficially.

== Types ==
Hidalguía was broken into several catagoties. Many of these were informal and created by the hidalgos themselves to deferinate themselves from others who they considered as less noble. These catagoties often overlapped and sometimes included other individuals who had the right not to pay taxes but would not normally be considered hidalgos as their status was not herditary.

An exemptation from paying taxes was a hidalgo's defining privlage. Many non-noble, non-hereditary, tax exempt invidudials often group themselves with the hidalguía in an attempt to gain status for themselves. They were often considered noble by their local community, even if they were not legally hidalgos.

Hidalgo de bragueta ("fly-of-the-trousers hidalgo") obtained tax exemption for having seven sons in lawful wedlock. This status was not legally hereditary, although said son often benefited from being the son of a hidalgo or calmed to be hidalgos themselves.

Hidalgos de privilegio (by virtue of royal privilege) and hidalgos de Real Provision (by virtue of meritorious acts) entail a grant of nobility from the monarch of Spain. Hidalgos de privilegio could pass on their heridary status to their children, who would also be considered hidalgos de privilegio dispite not earning the grant themsellves. This is not to be confused with Knighhood, which is not hereditary.

Hidalgos de sangre (by virtue of blood) are nobles who status comes from time immemorial. The origins of these families were lost to time and there were no surving documents mentioning a specific royal grant. Hidalgos de sangre were regonized as nobles simply because their families always have been. The majority of Hidalgos de sangre claimed decent from the origional infanzones, although the exact records were lost. When challenged, a hidalgo de sangre may obtain a judicial sentence validating his nobility from the Royal Chancillería of Valladolid or Granada, if he can prove that it has been accepted by local society and custom. In this case, the resulting legal document that verifies his nobility is called a carta ejecutoria de hidalguia (letters patent of nobility). Hidalgos de sangre status was often considered the baseline for hidalguía.

Hidalgo de solar conocido ("by virtue of known linage"), are nobles whose families own or have owned a solar or ancestral seat. A solar is generally an important building like a castle or a mansion, but it can extend to entire towns. Hidalgos de solar conocido were considered the highest tier of hidalguía, excluding the traditional noble titles. It is also the only type of hidalguía with a form of legal regonition in modern day Spain. The Lordship of the Solar de Tejada, and other historic estates, are divided among various desedants who have the right to title themselves "Lord" or hidalgo. This can be seen in King Juan Carlos grandon's Felipe de Marichalar y Borbón's extended title Caballero Divisoro Hijodalgo of the Illustrious Solar de Tejada. However, these are unique cases with a solar attached to a fuedal lordship.

Hidalgo de cuatro costados ("four-sided noble"), are nobles who could prove that all four of their grandparents were hidalgos. Historically, this was a requirement to join some chavalric orders.

Hidalgos de las Indias ("of the Indies) are a class of nobles created by King Philip II in 1573 to encourage the settlement of the Americas. Under the Laws of the Indies, settlers and their legitimate desedants who fulfilled specific contracts were granted the status of a hidalgo de solar conocido. However, this type of nobility was strictly limited to the Americas and the Philippines to encourage settlers to stay. If a hidalgo de las Indias traveled to Spain itself, they would have no noble privlages. Charles II of Spain issued a similar decree on March 22, 1697 that, among other matters, extended to the indigenous nobles of the Philippines, the principalía, as well as to their descendants, the preeminence and honors customarily attributed to the hidalgos of Castile. (Note: Por cuanto teniendo presentes las leyes y cédulas que se mandaron despachar por los Señores Reyes mis progenitores y por mí, encargo el buen tratamiento, amparo, protección y defensa de los indios naturales de la América, y que sean atendidos, mantenidos, favorecidos y honrados como todos los demás vasallos de mi Corona, y que por el trascurso del tiempo se detiene la práctica y uso de ellas, y siento tan conveniente su puntual cumplimiento al bien público y utilidad de los Indios y al servicio de Dios y mío, y que en esta consecuencia por lo que toca a los indios mestizos está encargo a los Arzobispos y Obispos de las Indias, por la Ley Siete, Título Siete, del Libro Primero, de la Recopilación, los ordenen de sacerdotes, concurriendo las calidades y circunstancias que en ella se disponen y que si algunas mestizas quisieren ser religiosas dispongan el que se las admita en los monasterios y a las profesiones, y aunque en lo especial de que quedan ascender los indios a puestos eclesiásticos o seculares, gubernativos, políticos y de guerra, que todos piden limpieza de sangre y por estatuto la calidad de nobles, hay distinción entre los Indios y mestizos, o como descendentes de los indios principales que se llaman caciques, o como procedidos de indios menos principales que son los tributarios, y que en su gentilidad reconocieron vasallaje, se considera que a los primeros y sus descendentes se les deben todas las preeminencias y honores, así en lo eclesiástico como en lo secular que se acostumbran conferir a los nobles Hijosdalgo de Castilla y pueden participar de cualesquier comunidades que por estatuto pidan nobleza, pues es constante que estos en su gentilismo eran nobles a quienes sus inferiores reconocían vasallaje y tributaban, cuya especie de nobleza todavía se les conserva y considera, guardándoles en lo posible, o privilegios, como así se reconoce y declara por todo el Título de los caciques, que es el Siete, del Libro Seis, de la Recopilación, donde por distinción de los indios inferiores se les dejó el señorío con nombre de cacicazgo, transmisible de mayor en mayor, a sus posterioridades...)

== Dissolution ==
In Asturias, Cantabria and other regions of Spain every seven years the King ordered the creation of padrones ("registers") where the population was classified either as hidalgos nobles, and therefore, exempt from taxation due to their military status or pecheros (from an archaic verb, pechar, "to pay") who comprised the estado llano ("lower ranks") and were excluded from military service and had to pay taxes. These padrones constitute nowadays a source of information about population genealogy and distribution as well as proof of nobility in certain cases.

Over the years the title lost its significance, especially in Spain where some regions practiced "universal hidalguía," granting noble status to anyone born in certain territories. Additionally, Kings routinely awarded the title in exchange for personal favors. By the time of the reign of the House of Bourbon, over half a million people enjoyed tax exemptions, putting tremendous strain on the royal state which wasn't calling their services to arms but relied more on professional armies and costly mercenaries.

Attempts were made to reform the title and by the early nineteenth century with the forced levies to military service of all citizens by conscription without any minimum requirements of nobility or pay or loyalty by honour but by coercion on desertion, it had entirely disappeared, along with the social class it had originally signified and most of its centuries-old developed code of honour in the nation's social culture.

Influenced by policies in France, hidalgos all became pecheros (taxpayers), without the privileges of the former title, and along with all citizens were also subject to conscription. Both estates of the realm (social classes) became combined, compulsorily contributing to the nation in service and taxes without exemption, while the titled nobility and royalty kept their former privileges and exemptions. Hidalguía was never formally abolished and some indvidials still claim this status, although the vast majority of untitled noble families make no claim on their historic status.

== Literature ==
The prototypical fictional hidalgo is Don Quixote, who was given the sobriquet 'the Ingenious Hidalgo' by his creator, Miguel de Cervantes. In the novel Cervantes has Don Quixote satirically present himself as a hidalgo de sangre and aspire to live the life of a knight-errant despite the fact that his economic position does not allow him to truly do so. Don Quixote's possessions allowed to him a meager life devoted to his reading obsession, yet his concept of honour led him to emulate the knights-errant.

The picaresque novel Lazarillo features a hidalgo so poor that he spreads breadcrumbs on his clothes, to simulate having eaten a meal. His hidalgo honour forbids him manual work but does not provide him with subsistence.

Henry Wadsworth Longfellow's Tales of a Wayside Inn includes "The Theologian's Tale" which recounts the tragedy of Hidalgo who betrays his two daughters to the Grand Inquisitor. Hidalgo himself lights the fires, then from a tower casts himself into the depths of despair.

== See also ==
- Fidalgo
- Gentleman
- Cuban nobility
- Principalía

== Bibliography ==
- Claude, Dietrich (1980), "Freedmen in the Visigothic Kingdom", in Edward James (ed.), Visigothic Spain: New Approaches, Oxford University Press, pp. 159–188, ISBN 0-19-822543-1
- MacKay, Angus (1977), Spain in the Middle Ages: From Frontier to Empire, 1000–1500, New York: St. Martin's Press, ISBN 0-312-74978-3
- Menéndez Pidal, Ramón (1967), La España del Cid (in Spanish) (6th ed.), Madrid: Espasa-Calpe
- Pérez de Tudela y Velasco, M. I. (1979), Infanzones y caballeros: su proyeccion en la esfera nobiliaria castellano-leonesa, Madrid
- Sánchez-Albornoz, Claudio (1965), "España y el feudalismo carolingio", Estudios sobre las instituciones medievales españolas, Serie de Historia General (in Spanish), Mexico: Universidad Nacional Autónoma de México, Instituto de Investigaciones Históricas, OCLC 951198
- Suárez Fernández, Luis (1970), Historia de España: Edad media (in Spanish), Madrid: Editorial Gredos, OCLC 270090
- Thompson, E. A (2000) [1969], The Goths in Spain, Oxford: Clarendon Press, ISBN 978-0-19-814271-3
