= Domingo de Santo Tomás =

Spanish Dominican missionary, bishop, and grammarian

Most Reverend Domingo de Santo Tomás
- Bishop of La Plata o Charcas
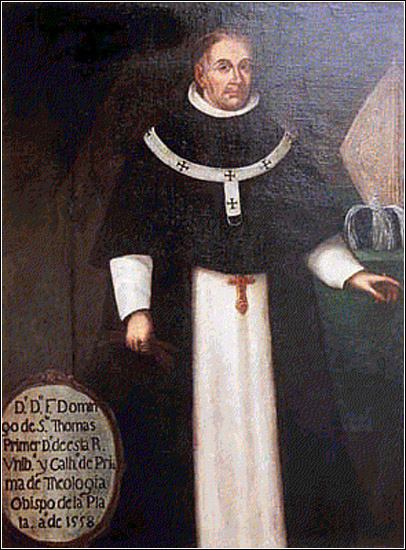
- Fray Domingo de Santo Tomás (''Museo de Arte de San Marcos collection)
- Church: Catholic Church
- Diocese: Diocese of La Plata o Charcas
- In office: 1562–1570
- Predecessor: Fernando González de la Cuesta
- Successor: Fernando Santillana Figueroa

Orders
- Consecration: 26 Dec 1562 by Jerónimo de Loaysa

Personal details
- Born: 1499 Seville, Spain
- Died: December 1570 (age 71) La Plata (Sucre)

Fray Domingo de Santo Tomás, O.P. (1499 – December 1570) was a Spanish Dominican missionary, bishop, and grammarian in the Viceroyalty of Peru. He compiled the first Quechua language grammar and dictionary, both published in 1560.

His grammar contained also the earliest known Quechua written text, as a catechetic appendix, and the first known linguistic description of clusivity.

A critic of Spanish treatment of the indigenous in Peru, he has been described as "greatest spokesman for native interests in Peru".

== Early life ==
Santo Tomás was born in Seville, Spain in 1499. He was educated in local church schools and entered the Dominican Order as a youth. After he was ordained as a priest and had served in Spain for years, he was assigned as a missionary to the Spanish colonial Viceroyalty of Peru in 1540, soon after the initial conquest of 1533. He founded the convent (monastery) and city of Yungay on 4 August 1540 to evangelize to the Inca.

== Missionary work ==
For the purpose of Indian Reductions, by which the Spanish brought natives together around missions for teaching and work, Domingo learned the Quechua dialect that was spoken along the Peruvian coast near Lima. The coastal dialect of Quechua was significantly different from the one in Cuzco, as was detailed by Diego González Holguín in the early 17th century. In 1545, Domingo was elected prior of the Convento del Santísimo Rosario in Lima. In 1549, he created the "Tasa" of Lima, with Fray Jeronimo de Loayza and Fray Tomás de San Martín. In 1560 he published his Grammatica o arte de la lengua general de los Indios de los Reynos del Peru (a Quechua grammar) in Valladolid, Spain. In the same year, he published his Lexicon, o Vocabulario de la lengua general del Peru.

On 6 July 1562, he was appointed by Pope Pius IV as Bishop of La Plata o Charcas. On 26 December 1562, he was consecrated bishop by Jerónimo de Loaysa, Archbishop of Lima. He served as Bishop of La Plata o Charcas until his death in December 1570 in La Plata (Sucre), the Bolivia region of the Viceroyalty of Peru.

== Works ==
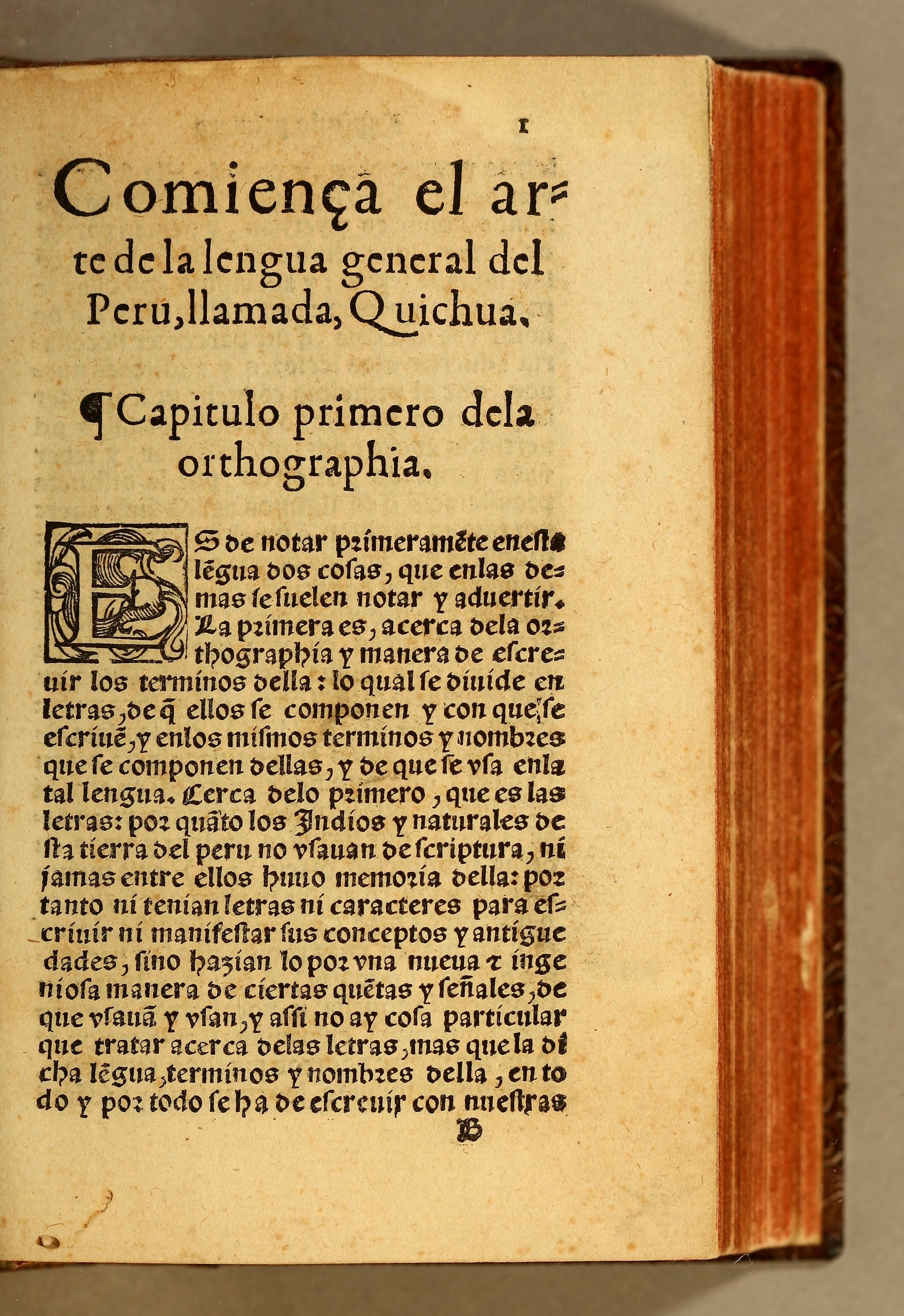
Chapter one of Grammatica, o Arte de la lengua general de los Indios de los reynos del Peru (Valladolid, 1560)

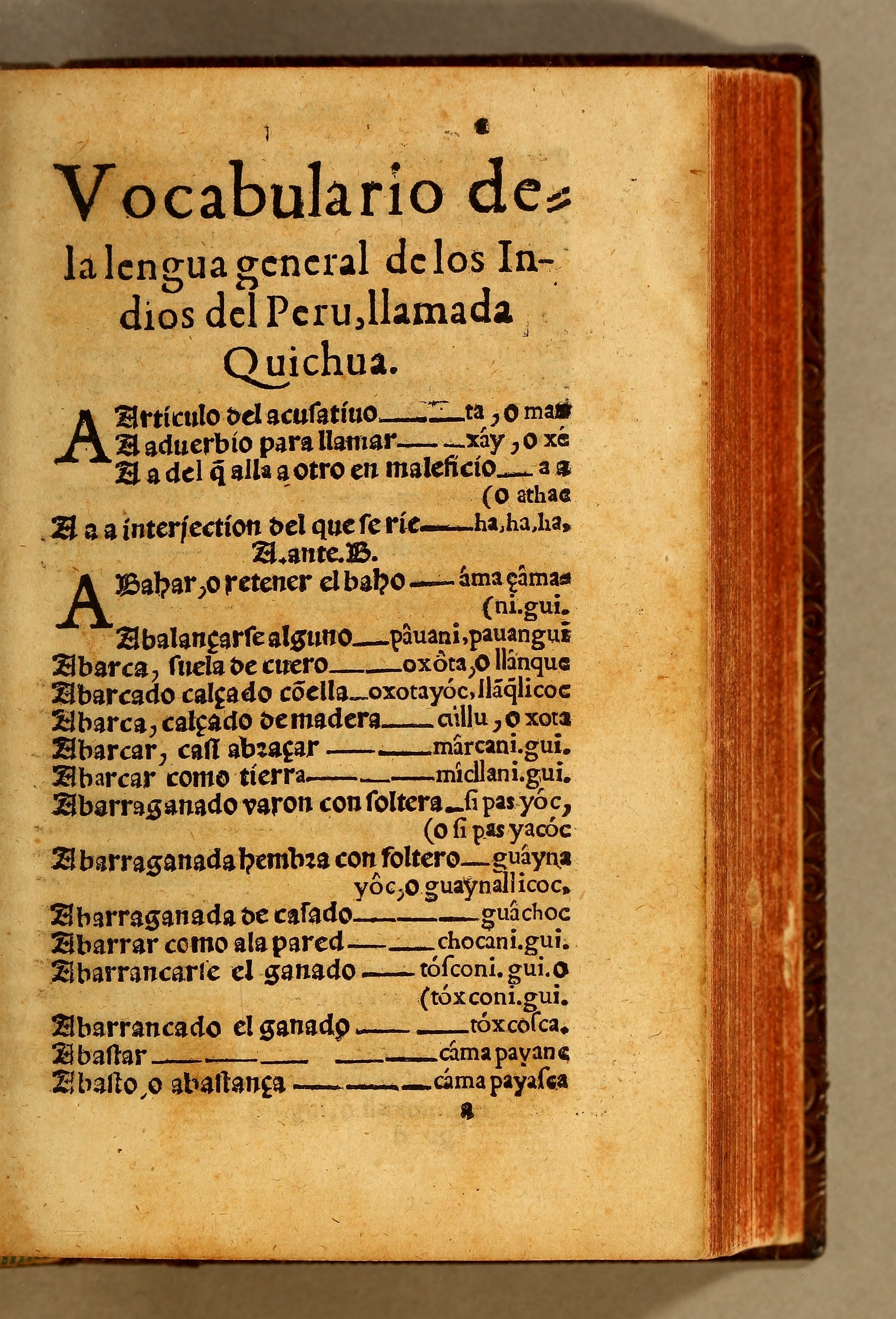
Vocabulary list from Lexicon, o Vocabulario de la lengua general del Peru (Valladolid, 1560)

- Grammatica o arte de la lengua general de los Indios de los Reynos del Peru (Valladolid, 1560).
- Lexicon, o Vocabulario de la lengua general del Peru (Valladolid, 1560).
- Plática para todos los Indios (1560).

== External links and additional sources ==
- Cheney, David M. "Archdiocese of Sucre". Catholic-Hierarchy.org. (for Chronology of Bishops) ^{[self-published]}
- Chow, Gabriel. "Metropolitan Archdiocese of Sucre (Bolivia)". GCatholic.org. (for Chronology of Bishops) ^{[self-published]}
- Digital facsimiles of works by Domingo de Santo Tomás from the John Carter Brown Library on Internet Archive

Catholic Church titles
| Preceded by Fernando González de la Cuesta | Bishop of La Plata o Charcas; 1562–1570 | Succeeded by Fernando Santillana Figueroa |
