= Grammar or Art of the General Language of the Indians of the Kingdoms of Peru =

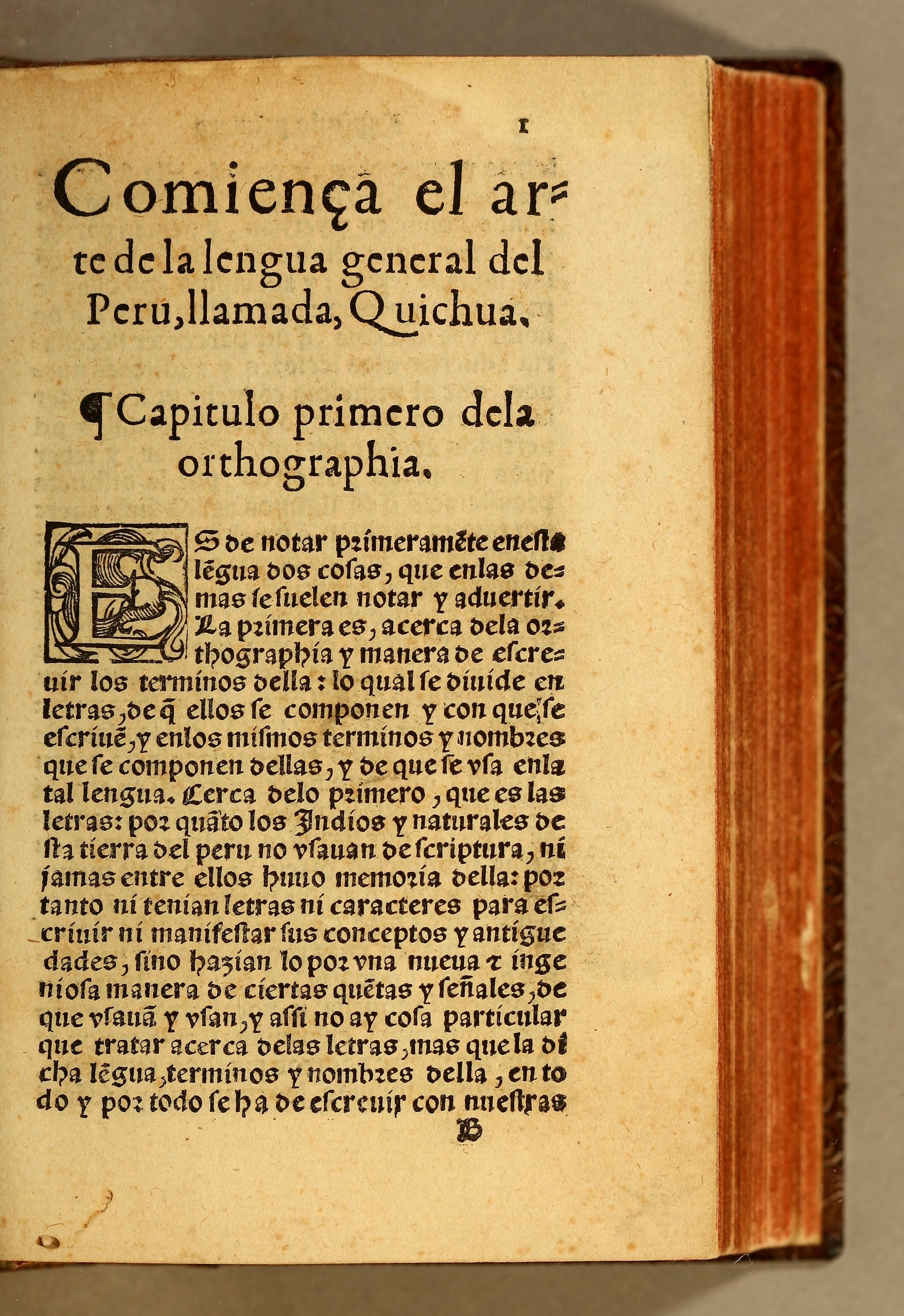
First chapter of Grammatica, o Arte de la lengua general de los Indios de los reynos del Perú (" ). Valladolid, 1560.

The Grammatica o arte de la lengua general de los indios de los reynos del Perú ("Grammar or Art of the general language of the Indians of the Kingdoms of Peru") was the first work on the grammar of Quechua. It was written and published by the Spanish priest and missionary Domingo de Santo Tomás in Valladolid, Spain, in 1560.

According to the author, the work was written for two reasons: to teach Quechua to other missionaries so that the languages could be used in the evangelization in the Americas, and to demonstrate that indigenous Peruvians had a "language of civilization", that is to say, that the language was comparable in complexity to that of other languages considered to be cultivated by his contemporaries, such as Latin and Greek.

The variety of Quechua described by Tomás is now known as Classical Quechua in its coastal variant.

This work was written while the author was the parish priest responsible for religious instruction at the parish of Santo Domingo de Real Aucallama in the Chancay Valley, in the present-day province of Huaral.
