= Fray Thomas de San Martín =

Roman Catholic prelate and bishop

Most Reverend Thomás de San Martín
- Bishop of La Plata o Charcas
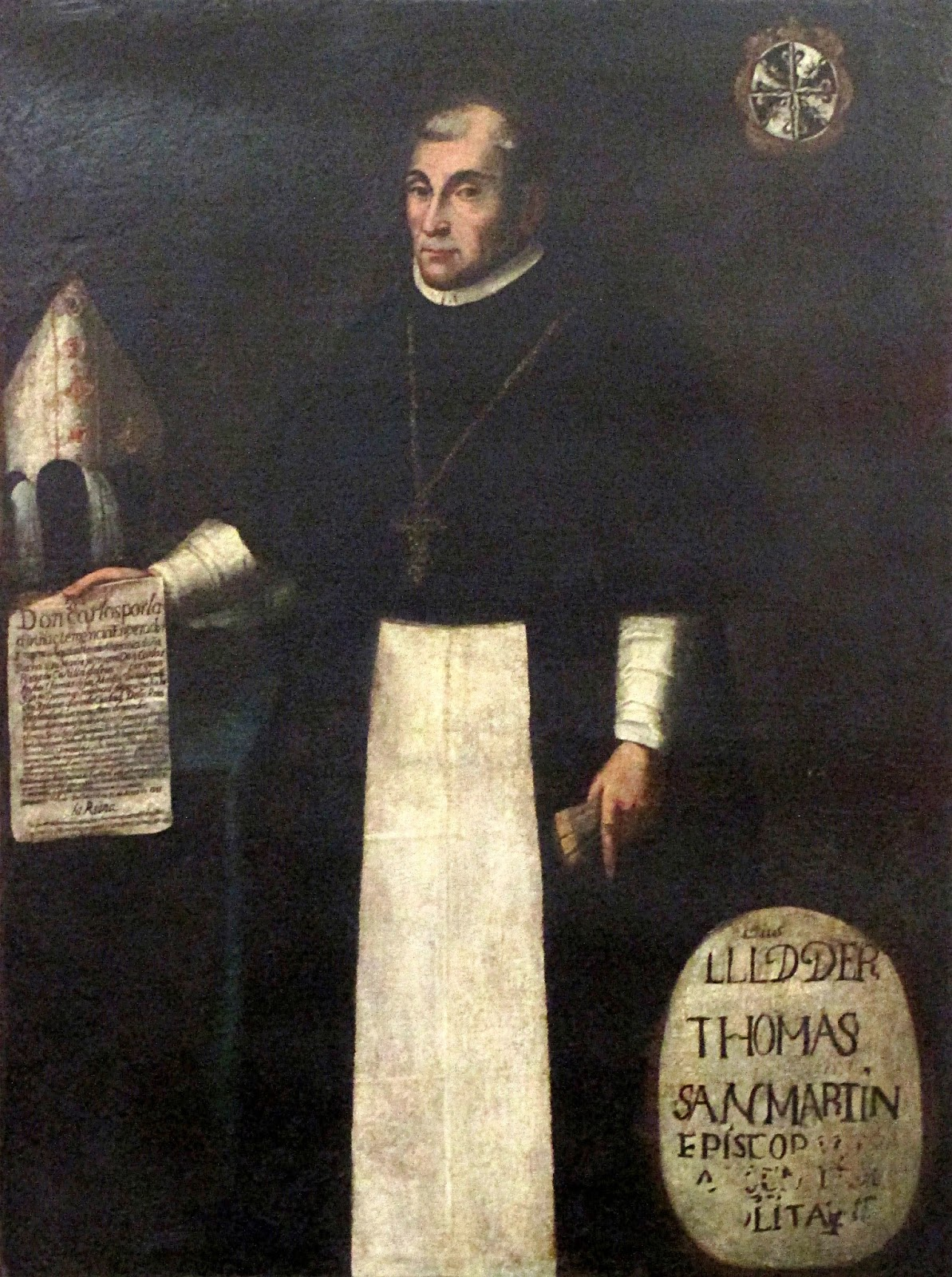
- Church: Catholic Church
- Diocese: Diocese of La Plata o Charcas
- In office: 1552–1559
- Predecessor: None
- Successor: Fernando González de la Cuesta

Personal details
- Born: March 7, 1482 Córdoba, Spain
- Died: 1559 (aged 76–77)

Fray Thomas de San Martín (March 7, 1482 – August 31, 1555) was the founder of the National University of San Marcos in Lima, Peru, a notable Spanish scholar, and was appointed the first Bishop of La Plata o Charcas (1552–1559).

== Biography ==
=== Early life ===
San Martín was born in Palencia (in modern-day Castile-Leon). In his youth, he was inspired by the ideals of medieval chivalry. Later he entered in the convent of San Pablo de Córdoba and became professor of arts and theology where he gained the reputation as a prolific scholar. He was sent to Seville to attend the Saint Thomas College.

=== Achievements in the New World ===
His work in Peru began as a priest and physician during the Spanish conquest of the Americas in the 1530s. Together with Pizarro and the other conquistadors he brought Catholicism to the New World. Cristóbal Vaca de Castro, who was sent by the Spanish crown to impose order on the newly conquered territories, asked Fray Tomás to establish a provisional government in Peru. It is said that he was selected by Vaca de Castro for the task because of his moral authority and the prestige he enjoyed.

On June 27, 1552, he was appointed by Pope Julius III as Bishop of La Plata o Charcas. He served as Bishop La Plata o Charcas until his death in 1559. During this period, he was highly critical of the brutality of the conquistadors towards the indigenous peoples of the Americas. While Bishop, he was the principal co-consecrator of Bernardino de Carmona, Auxiliary Bishop of Santiago de Compostela.

After his work as priest and scholar over 25 years, he was appointed the first rector magnificus of National University of San Marcos.

=== Final days ===
He died at his home in the Convent of Rosario in Lima on August 31, 1555 at the age of 72.

== External links and additional sources ==
- Cheney, David M. "Archdiocese of Sucre". Catholic-Hierarchy.org. (for Chronology of Bishops) ^{[self-published]}
- Chow, Gabriel. "Metropolitan Archdiocese of Sucre (Bolivia)". GCatholic.org. (for Chronology of Bishops) ^{[self-published]}
- "Brief information from UNMSM and Historical Records from the 16th Century and colonial times". National University of San Marcos Central Library Files.
- "National University of San Marcos: Rector Gallery". National University of San Marcos Official Website. Archived from the original on February 20, 2007.
- Luis Antonio Eguiguren (1951). La universidad en el siglo XVI. Tomo I. National University of Saint Mark Editorial fund.
