= Diego González Holguín =

Spanish Jesuit priest and linguist

Diego González Holguín (1560 – c. 1620) was a Spanish Jesuit priest and missionary, as well as a scholar of the Quechua languages during the era of the Viceroyalty of Peru.

González Holguín was born in the Extremadura region of western Spain in 1560. He arrived in Peru as a missionary in 1581. He undertook a study of Quechua, and in 1607 published a grammar that documented "Classical Quechua", a dialect of Southern Quechua that was spoken in the contemporary Incan court. The complete title of the work is Gramatica y arte nueva dela lengva general de todo el Perv, llamada lengva Quichva, o Lengva del Inca).

In 1608 he published a dictionary, Vocabulario de la lengva general de todo el Perv llamada lengva Qquichua o del Inca El Quechua Cortesano del Cuzco, the first dictionary of the Cusco dialect. According with the numbers registered by Domingo de Santo Tomás (author of the first Quechua grammar and dictionary), it was the second most important work about the Quechua language. He is also the author of Privileges Granted to the Indians (Spanish: Privilegios concedidos a los Indios), published the same year.

He died in Lima c. 1620.

== Works ==
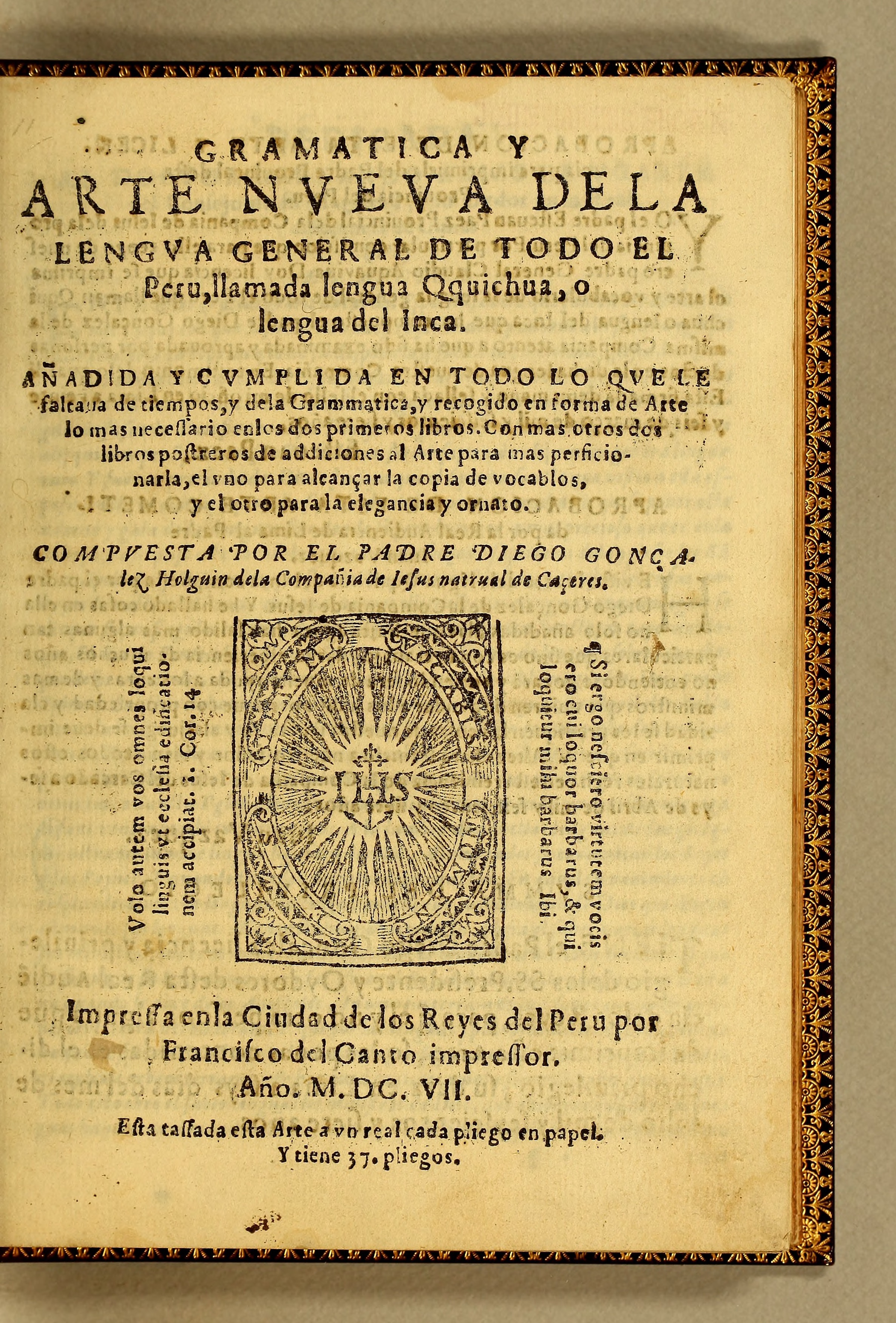
Title page, Gramatica y arte nueua de la lengua general de todo el Peru, llamada lengua Quichua, o lengua del Inca (Lima, 1607)

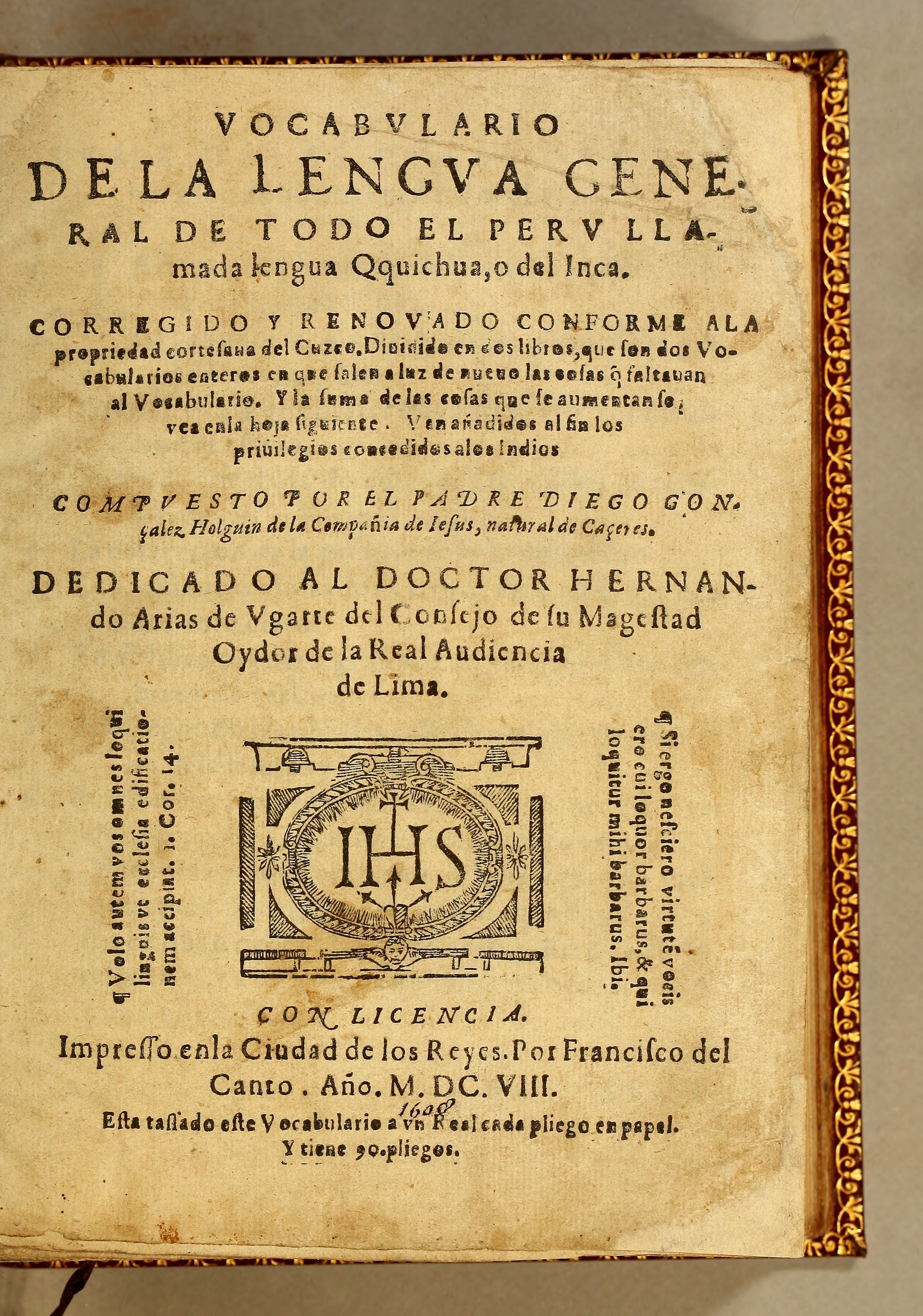
Title page, Vocabulario de la lengua general de todo el Peru llamada lengua Qquichua, o del Inca (Lima, 1608)

- Gramatica y arte nueua de la lengua general de todo el Peru, llamada lengua Quichua, o lengua del Inca (Lima, 1607)
- Vocabulario de la lengua general de todo el Peru llamada lengua Qquichua, o del Inca (Lima, 1608)
- Privilegios concedidos a los Indios (Lima, 1608)
