= Anchanchu =

Legendary creature of Bolivia

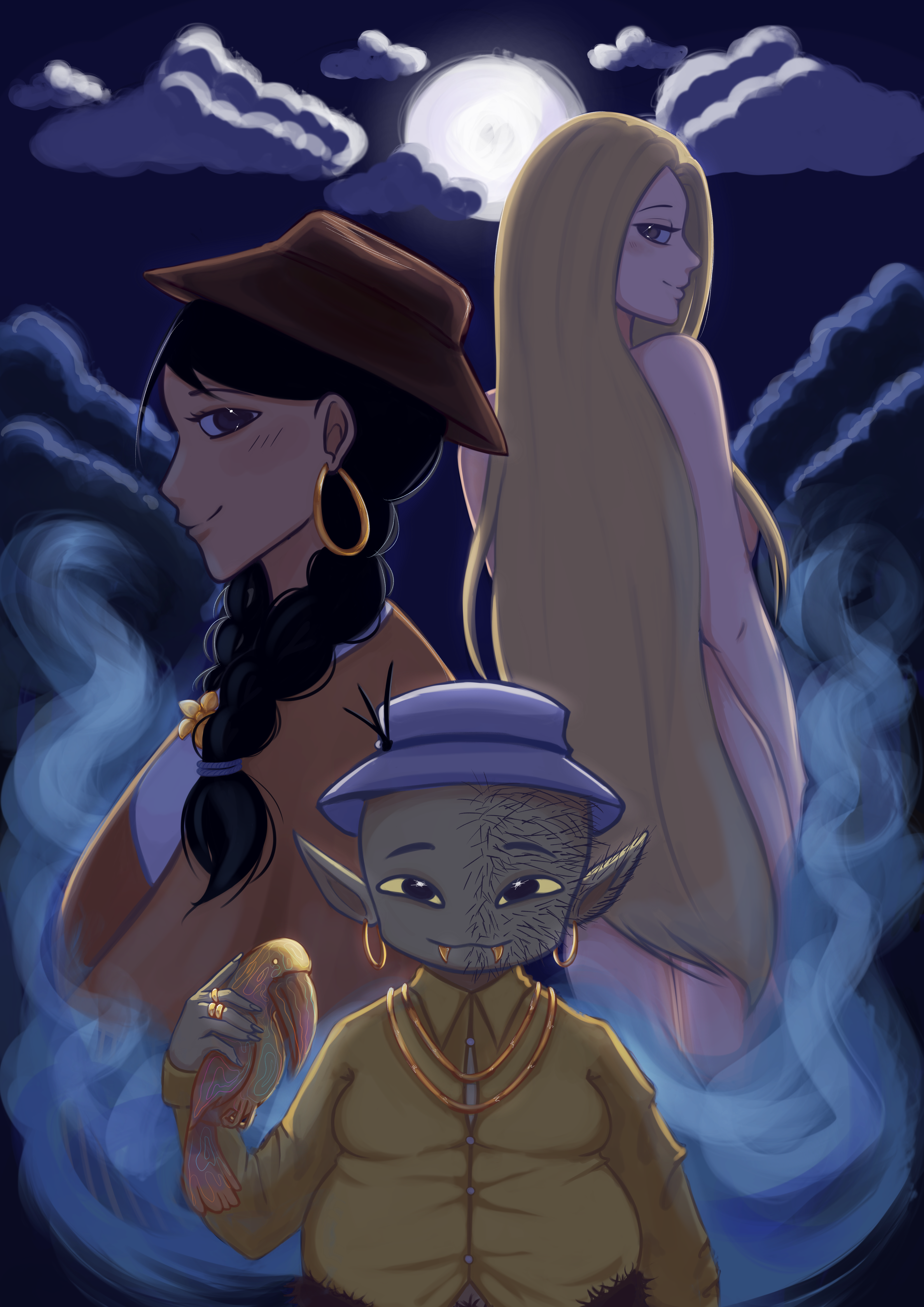
Illustration of an anchanchu and its different forms

The anchanchu, abchanchu or anchancho is a legendary Andean vampire largely originating from the Aymara region of Bolivia. It shapeshifts into the form of a helpless, elderly traveler, a rich Aymara woman with gold teeth, a seductive gringa, or a monstrous animal. When a passerby offers to help, the anchanchu victimizes them and drinks their blood, causing them to die of blood loss or disease. The anchanchu is the most feared evil being among the Aymara people due to its lethality.

The anchanchu legend is also shared among the Peruvian Aymara community, though the Peruvian version is considerably different. In Peru, the anchanchu is a duende, similar to a dwarf. Called Muki or Muqui, it lives underground and has a penchant for gold.

An analogous deity is the Uru god Tiw, the protector of mines, rivers and lakes. This deity's name was transformed to El Tío in Spanish.

== Description ==
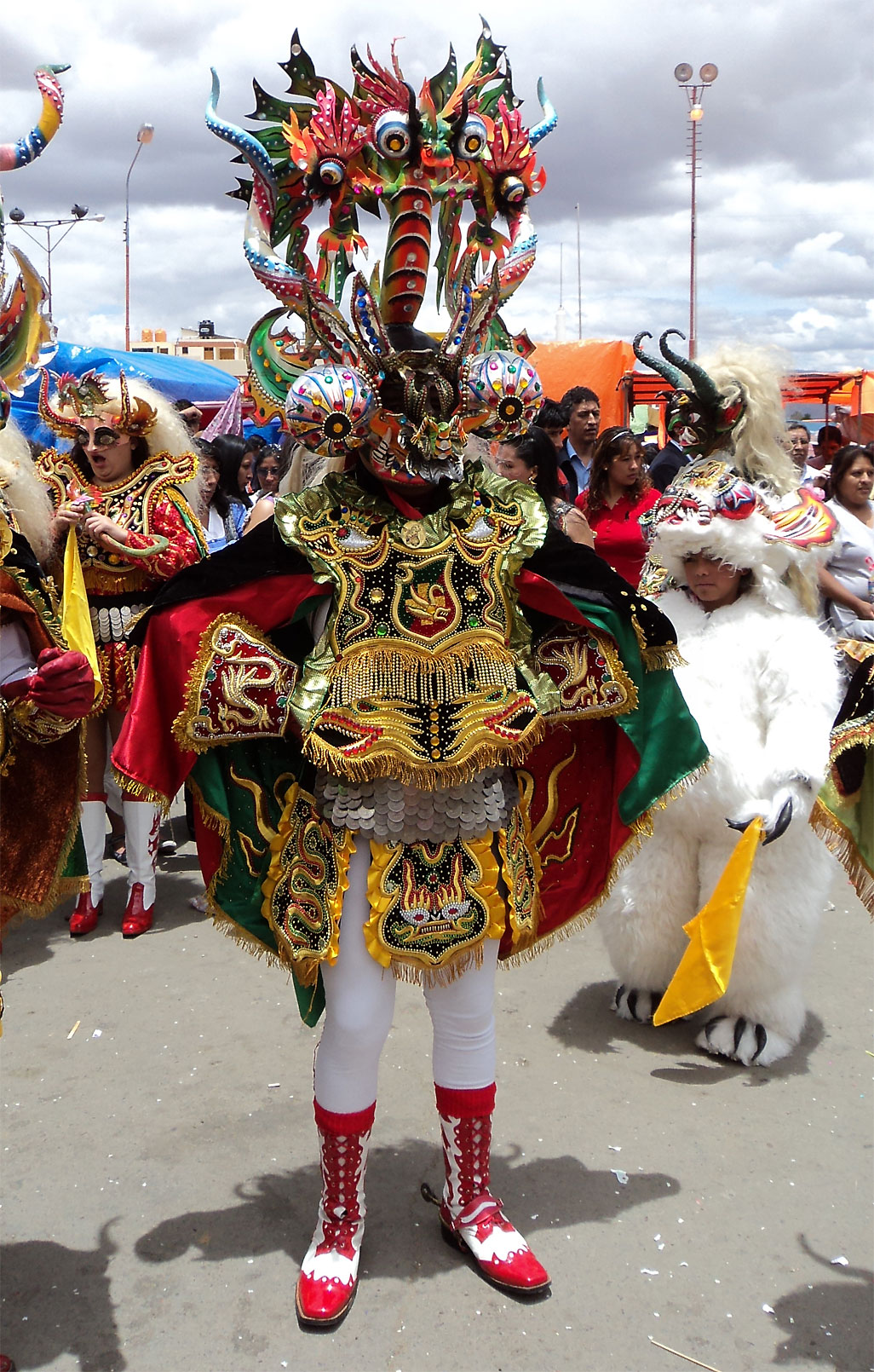
Character from the Diablada, at the carnival at Oruro, Bolivia. The dance has roots in the legend of anchanchu.

The anchanchu lives in the most desolate caves and grottoes of the altiplano, a plateau in the Andes Mountains. It has an insatiable desire and frequents mountain paths and the edges of grazing grounds at night, leaving behind whirlwinds. Anchanchus may take several forms. According to some accounts, it disguises itself as an old man, sometimes hunchbacked or with a pot-belly, and an enormous penis. They may also appear as a wealthy cholita, or Aymara woman, with gold teeth, or a seductive gringa, usually in the nude. Anchanchus may appear wearing luxurious garments and are often found near archeological sites. In other places, they take the form of a monstrous animal, a half-animal/half-human, or a giant arachnid; they are also associated with animals such as the fox, whose dung and organic remains are considered effective remedies for conditions caused by the Anchanchu. Anchanchus take advantage of peoples' compassion to suck blood from their lips or heart. Since people are most prone to anchanchu attacks when they are walking alone, some believe that when doing so, it is best to pray or talk to oneself; placing a small rock underneath the tongue may also have a protective effect.

Those who are attacked by the anchanchu die from loss of blood or strange diseases. Anchanchus usually drive their victims to insanity. According to tradition, anchanchu victims must be treated quickly with the help of yatiris or amautas, who make an offering known as ch'iyara misa ("black table"), made up of hard, dry food waste, which resembles anchanchu feces (anchanchus also eat their own excrement). After making the black table offering, special rituals are performed, followed by spiritual healing. If the anchanchu is not satisfied by this offering, it means death is imminent; it will instead drink the person's warm blood and eat their flesh.

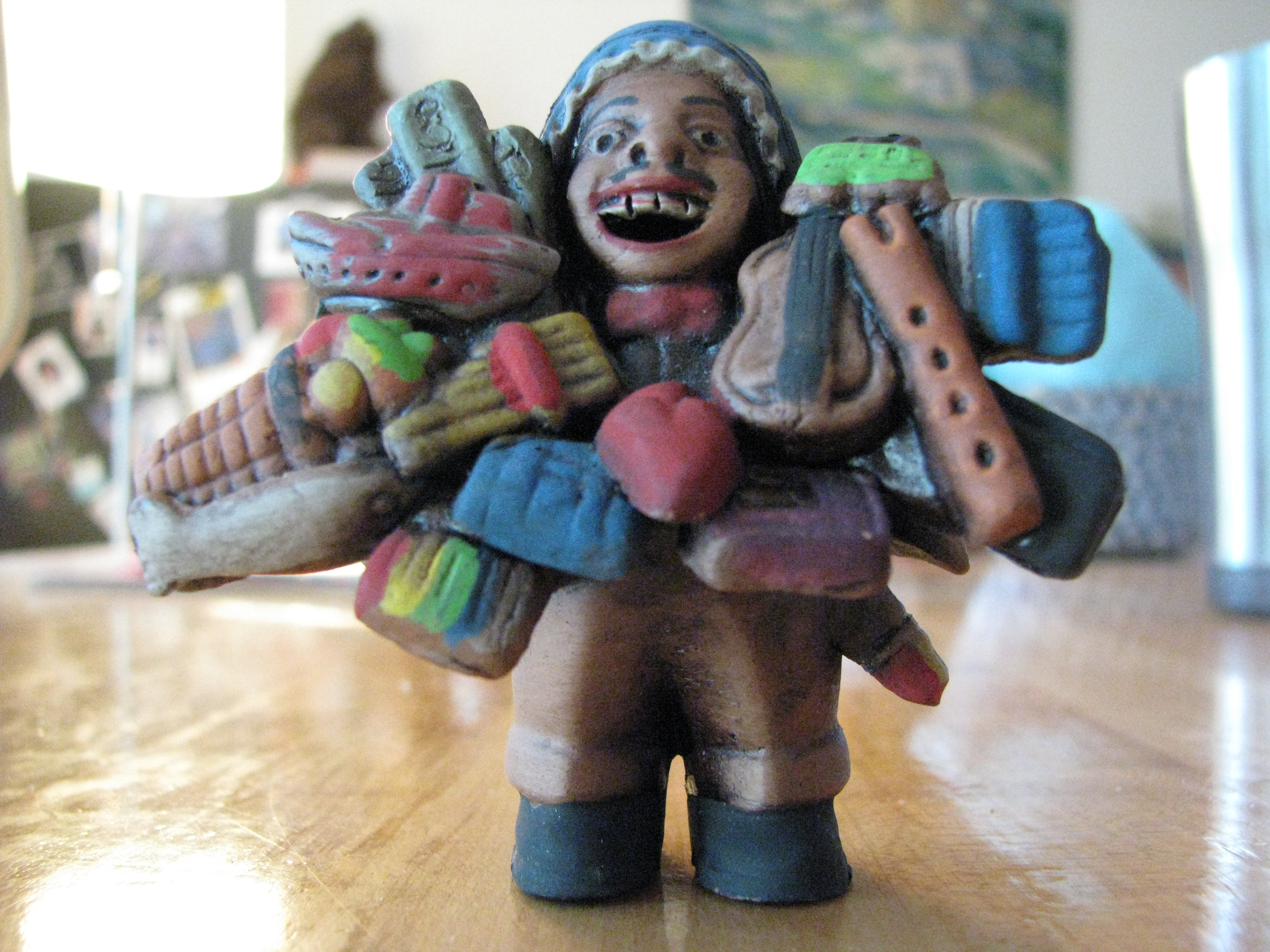
Ekeko figurine. Anchanchu is the illegitimate brother of Ekeko.

Along with other feared creatures such as the kharisiri, anchanchus inhabit the world "of below and inside," known as mankhapacha. (Note: also Manqhapacha, in Spanish: the world "de abajo y de adentro")

According to tradition, the anchanchu is the illegitimate brother of Ekeko (Iqiqu) and was born as a result of an extramarital affair of the Mallku of Chakamita with his concubines. Ekeko is the central figure of the Alasitas festival in La Paz, Bolivia, which takes place every January 24.

== Alternate versions ==
There is a wide variation in its description. While many popular online sources depict anchanchu as a demonic figure, Aymara mythology casts him as a gatekeeper of the underground mineral world, and homage must be paid to anchanchu before mining the Earth's resources. This homage includes the sacrifice of a llama, burnt with dry dung fuel, as well as a dance to the accompaniment of an Andean pan flute called a siku, with dancers wearing ceramic masks with taruca horns, representing anchanchu. After the sacrifice, a layqa reads the ashes of the burnt animal to understand anchanchu's will. As a result of this imagery, the Spanish associated anchanchu with the devil. A related dance known as the Diablada, which has evolved since the 1600s to combine Spanish, Christian and Aymara elements, is performed in Bolivia.

In Peru, the anchanchu is a duende, similar to a dwarf. Called Muki or Muqui, it lives underground and has a penchant for gold. Anchanchu is also related to the Uru god Tiw, the protector of mines, rivers and lakes. The deity's name is El Tío in Spanish.
