= Supay =

Inca and Andean underworld deity or spirit, later associated with the Christian Devil

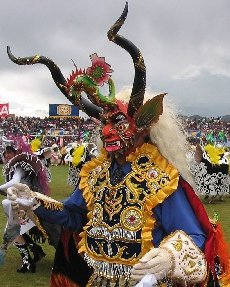
- Supay, as interpreted in a Peruvian festival

Creature information
- Folklore: Quechua, Aymara, and Inca mythologies

Origin
- Region: Andes
- Habitat: Hurin Pacha (Andean underworld)

In the Quechua, Aymara, and Inca mythologies, Supay (from Quechua: supay "shadow"; Aymara: Supaya) was originally an ambivalent spirit, both benevolent and harmful, a denizen of the Incan netherworld (Hurin Pacha). He is a central figure in the Andean worldview, particularly in the Inca and Quechua-Aymara traditions. He is not a simple "demon" in the Christian sense, but rather an ambivalent deity embodying the positive and negative forces of the universe.

Supay was the supreme lord of Uku Pacha (the Inca underworld). He was a primordial and multifaceted force that represented shadow, night, darkness, chaos, and the inevitable transition of death. According to the 1560 Quechua-Spanish dictionary by Friar Domingo de Santo Tomás, the term in its original form was neutral and could be used to refer to a morally good spirit (allisupa, 'good angel') or a morally bad spirit (manaallisupa, 'bad angel'). Later, the term was used to refer to the Christian devil.

Either way, in the Spanish Christianized conception the Supay was turned more or less into the Devil or demons living in Hell.

== Etymology ==
The anonymous dictionary of 1586, as do Father Diego González Holguín (1608), Jorge A. Lira (1945) and Jesús Lara (1971), the name Supay comes from the Quechua word "Supa", which translates as shadow, illness, death, possessed, or crazy. In early Quechua-Spanish usage, the sense of "shadow" or "soul" or "anima" is followed.

Other forms include: zupay, çupay, hupai, hupee.

== Features ==
According to Inca mythology, the term Supay refers to an entire race of demons, as well as the god of death, ruler of the underworld and of a race of abyssal warriors.

Supay is commonly described as having a "demonic" appearance, with long horns, glassy, star-like eyes, and a feline face adorned with long fangs and ears. Like other Andean gods, Supay is a multiform deity, capable of manifesting in any form. Combining this with his conflicted and unpredictable personality, Supay is classified as a trickster, as he can both protect humanity on its journey to the afterlife and has the power to deceive and/or urge humanity to reveal its most twisted side. These characteristics and abilities made him a very dangerous being to those who did not show him respect.

Even so, there were and still are people who firmly believe in his power to the point of worshipping him, so that the god might grant them favors, whether for good or for evil. His worship took the form of offerings, altars, and rituals.

Supay is commonly regarded as the personification of all evil. Despite this, the original concept of Supay portrays him as an ambivalent god who could be considered both good and evil. Ancient legends mentioned that Supay went beyond the evil he evoked, as he is described as the protector and guide of the path taken by the dead.

Supay was created by Viracocha to show humanity that there will always be evil in the world, but not enough of it. Because of this, the Incas believed he was a being who balanced the scales between good and evil. The fact that Viracocha created him makes him the brother of the gods Inti, Illapa, and Mama Quilla.

He could be benevolent toward the living whom he favored and those who had died a dignified death, but he was terrible and evil toward the rest, both in the underworld and on earth, because he could tip the scales of misfortune simply by thinking about it.

The Incas believed that Supay was the deity who maintained the balance between positive and negative supernatural forces.

Supay was a Machiavellian deity who mocked the suffering of others, their beliefs, and even their knowledge, for he cast doubt on everything and was capable of altering ideas and thoughts, turning a holy man into a villain and a wise man into a madman devoid of conscience or understanding.

Hurin Pacha was his natural home, but he could come and go between Earth and Heaven as he pleased. This established him as an unpredictable, capricious deity with a ubiquitous nature (he could be benevolent or Machiavellian; he could manifest in any form and in any place, proving himself to be omnipresent and showing that the laws were not entirely subject to him). Wherever he manifested, Supay spread a cloak of terror and despair. Likewise, this deity reminded each and every one (gods or humans) that they were always under the threat of destruction, disappearance, and death. This applied to anything they believed to be beautiful or secure, since it could vanish in an instant and forever, thwarting all the dreams and plans of gods and men (as the personification of death, Supay and his ubiquitous nature evoke the omnipresent and inevitable reality of death itself, which lies in wait at every corner of the universe).

Supay was also the creator of men, but they were made in his image and likeness, eventually becoming terrible demons of the depths, the roads, the mountains, the waters, the jungle, and the caves.

The Spanish equated him with the Devil because, according to Andean traditions and legends, Supay appears as a huaca (deity) of good and bad luck, of sexual love or infatuation, of transgression and adventure, of excesses and fun that does not take life seriously, because life is fleeting and nothing is serious.

== Supay according to chroniclers ==
Like the early evangelists, many chroniclers have described and portrayed the divinity Supay in the same erroneous manner.

The most atavistic reference to Supay is found in the lexicon of Fray Domingo de Santo Tomás. In it, he alleges the nature of Supay as follows:

"And these evil angels (Supays) were cast out of heaven by God for their sins, and banished here below to earth, to hell in great fire, darkness, and stench, where they remain to this day, and will remain forever imprisoned, suffering for their sins. And these are the ones you call ‘manaalliçupay’ in your language."

(«Y a estos ángeles malos (Supays) por sus pecados los echó Dios del cielo, y desterró acá baxo de la tierra, al infierno en gran fuego, oscuridad, y hedor, donde hasta agora están, y estarán para siempre encerrados, padesciendo por sus pecados. Y estos son los que en vuestra lengua llamays "manaalliçupay"»)

~ Léxicon, o Vocabulario de la lengua general del Perú

In this testimony, Supay is equated with evil angels, who are considered manaalliçupay. The quote falsely suggests that the souls of those who became ancestors and went to Uku Pacha were demons. This was done to forcibly equate Andean concepts associated with death with the devil and hell. This equation of Supay with the devil was questioned by some, including the clergyman Bartolomé Álvarez. He questioned the aforementioned equation, recognizing that doing so would confirm that the devil could only be the dead individual.

Another interpretation is the description of Supay as a dual-aligned deity. Dualism in Inca gods is very common, since gods can be benevolent or, due to their fury, cause misfortune.

Regarding the link between souls and Supay, Guamán Poma de Ayala also highlights this relationship in his work Nueva corónica y buen gobierno (New Chronicle and Good Government). The chronicler states that:

"Idols, Uacas of the Inga of the others in this kingdom, which was in the time of the Inga of how it was first followed, of how Topa Inga Yupanqui spoke with the uacas and stones and demons, and knew by luck from them the past and the future of them and of the whole world, and of how the Spaniards were to come to rule; and so because of this the Inga was called Uiracocha Inga. But he did not teach them anything else about God, although they say that they said there was another Lord greater than them, they were devils, and so they said Supay, which is how they knew him as Supay."

(«Ídolos, Uacas del Inga de los demás de este reino, que fue en tiempo del Inga de cómo se siguió primero, de cómo Topa Inga Yupanqui hablaba con las uacas y piedras y demonios, y sabía por suerte de ellos lo pasado y lo venidero de ellos y de todo el mundo, y de cómo habían de venir los españoles a gobernar; y así por ello el Inga se llamó Uiracocha Inga. Pero lo demás de cosa de Dios no le enseñó a saber, aunque dicen que decían que había otro Señor muy grande más que ellos, eran diablos, y así decían Supay, que por tal conocían por Supay».)

~ Nueva corónica y buen gobierno, capitulo 12, pagina 264

Two important aspects stand out in this quote: the first refers to the origin of idolatry in the Andes, associated with the Inca ruler. The second refers to the term Supay, which is again translated as devil, to indicate that the Incas already had knowledge of the devil. The Supay presented by Guamán is related to the authority of the Inca and his transformation after death into a "demon," who demanded veneration and sacrificial offerings from the natives.

As is axiomatic, not all deceased persons could be considered Supay or ancestors, since only those who had had a certain prestige, that is, those who had been political leaders or prominent figures whose investiture allowed them, even after death, to demand the fulfillment of the rituals that corresponded to them.

It is worth mentioning that when the Inca died, he passed into his state as an ancestor, in which he was mummified in a fetal position and offered as a sign of support for his soul to cross over into the afterlife. The mallqui (mummy or body of the ancestors) of the ruler and/or ethnic leader was placed in tombs called machays (caves). In various ceremonies and special events, the mummy was displayed outside its enclosure and carried around to various sites.

The work also alludes to Supay in a non-explicit way, using the terms devil and/or demon to replace it. However, in a quote from his work, he writes the following:

"When snakes appear or enter their homes, and owls and little owls sing, bats that they call tuco, chuchic, pacpac, pecpe, chicollom, cayaycuuan. Taparanco yaycuuan. Uro nina, ayacta ayzaycuuan. Ycjapas maycan uanoson. Atocmi "zupayta" ayzan uarmitam ychapas carita. [The owl, the barn owl, the paq paq, p'iqpi, chiqallu (species of owls) have called me. A moth has entered inside me. The will-o'-the-wisps have dragged my corpse away. When will we die? By the way, the fox has dragged away the demon, a woman, or perhaps a man.]"

(«Quando le paresen o se les entran en sus casas las culebras y cantar de lechuzas y muchuelos, murciélagos que los llaman tuco, chuchic, pacpac, pecpe, chicollom, cayaycuuan. Taparanco yaycuuan. Uro nina, ayacta ayzaycuuan. Ycjapas maycan uanoson. Atocmi "zupayta" ayzan uarmitam ychapas carita. [El búho, la lechuza, el paq paq, p'iqpi, chiqallu (especie de búhos) me han llamado. Una mariposa nocturna ha entrado dentro de mí. Los fuegos fatuos me han arrastrado el cadáver. ¿Quizá cuándo vamos a morir? Por cierto, el zorro ha arrastrado al demonio, a una mujer o quizás a un hombre.]»

~ Nueva corónica y buen gobierno, capitulo 12, pagina 284

This quote is complemented by the illustration in the section Abuciones y agüeros (Omens and Portents) of his work, as the illustration depicts what appears to be an Inca sorcerer surrounded by various animals, including a fox in the foreground. In the drawing, the fox is dragging something in its mouth that appears to be a small reptile or a large insect. This act alludes to a superstition of that time, an omen that was, in turn, interpreted by the Inca sorcerer.

After the aforementioned quote, the chronicler mentions: "hearing the howling of foxes or some other animal." This is interpreted as an example of an announcement of death. In relation to the above, some Andean legends associate the fox with harm and misfortune. Likewise, the animal maintains a relationship of perpetual enmity with man. However, the figure of the fox has an ambivalent meaning. In the Manuscript of Huarochirí, the fox knows the secrets of the hero Tantañamca, but refuses to help the huaca Cuniraya Huiracocha and, as a result, is cursed to be at odds with men. In Andean areas, peasants associate the fox with the "dog of Mallku" (the spirit of the mountain that protects the community) and/or the "dog of the gentiles" that protects the houses of deceased ancestors and the chullpas (funeral monuments) where they are buried.

The word Supay can be seen a second time in the chapter on idols as the main element of a curse among sorcerers:

"Both spoke of this same Pachacámac, although, not knowing the true meaning of the word, they attributed it to the devil. In saying that the God of the Christians and Pachacámac were one and the same, he spoke the truth, because the intention of those Indians was to give this name to the supreme God, who gives life and being to the universe, as the name itself signifies. And in saying that he was Pachacámac, he lied, because the Indians never intended to give this name to the devil, whom they called nothing but Zupay, which means devil, and to name him, they first spat as a sign of curse and abomination, and they named Pachacámac with the worship and demonstrations we have mentioned. However, as this enemy had so much power among those infidels, he made himself God, entering into everything that the Indians venerated and regarded as sacred. He spoke in their oracles and temples and in the corners of their houses and other places, telling them that he was Pachacámac and that he was all the other things to which the Indians attributed divinity, and because of this deception, they worshipped those things in which the devil spoke to them, thinking that it was the deity they imagined. If they understood that it was the devil, they would burn them, as they do now, by the mercy of the Lord, who wanted to communicate this to them."

(«Hablando ambos de este mismo Pachacámac, aunque por no saber la propia significación del vocablo se lo atribuyeron al demonio. El cual, en decir que el Dios de los cristianos y el Pachacámac era todo uno, dijo verdad, porque la intención de aquellos indios fue dar este nombre al sumo Dios, que da vida y ser al universo, como lo significa el mismo nombre. Y en decir que él era el Pachacámac mintió, porque la intención de los indios nunca fue dar este nombre al demonio, que no le llamaron sino Zupay, que quiere decir diablo, y para nombrarle, escupían primero en señal de maldición y abominación, y al Pachacámac nombraban con la adoración y demostraciones que hemos dicho. Empero, como este enemigo tenía tanto poder entre aquellos infieles, haciase Dios, entrándose en todo aquello que los indios veneraban y acataban por cosa sagrada. Hablaba en sus oráculos y templos y en los rincones de sus casas y otras partes, diciéndoles que era el Pachacámac y que era todas las demás cosas a que los indios atribuían deidad, y por este engaño adoraban aquellas cosas en que el demonio les hablaba, pensando que era la deidad que ellos imaginaban, que si entendieran que era el demonio las quemaran entonces como ahora lo hacen por la misericordia del Señor, que quiso comunicarlas».)

~ Comentarios Reales de los Incas, Libro Segundo, Capítulo II

In this quote, Pachacámac is referred to as God, while Supay is relegated to the role of the Christian devil. Supay is also attributed with evil characteristics, such as entering and possessing the objects of veneration and worship of the natives in order to deceive them. At this point, it seems that Garcilaso emphasizes the huacas (sacred sites), which, as is well known, were a set of elements sacred to the Inca people. Within these huacas were idols and representations of various gods, which were highly venerated. To prove their veracity, the huacas had to communicate with the Inca rulers to manifest their power and, therefore, be objects of veneration and respect. If the huaca did not speak, it was a false huaca and should not be given prestige as such. In relation to these elements and Supay, Garcilaso alludes to Supay's possession of these elements to deceive and disorient the population. Multiple chroniclers have associated huacas with idolatrous acts and, therefore, with the devil. Inca Garcilaso is no exception in this regard. Continuing with Garcilaso, in another quote from his aforementioned work, he equates Uku Pacha with hell and/or the underworld. The respective quote is as follows:

"They believed that there was another life after this one, with punishment for the wicked and rest for the good. They divided the universe into three worlds: they called heaven Hanan Pacha, which means high world, where they said the good went to be rewarded for their virtues; they called this world of generation and corruption Hurin Pacha, which means lower world; they called the center of the earth Ucu Pacha, which means lower world down there, where they said the wicked went, and to make it clearer they gave it another name, which is Zupaipa Huacin, which means House of the Devil."

(«Creían que había otra vida después de esta, con pena para los malos y descanso para los buenos. Dividían el universo en tres mundos: llaman al cielo Hanan Pacha, que quiere decir mundo alto, donde decían que iban los buenos a ser premiados de sus virtudes; llamaban Hurin Pacha a este mundo de la generación y corrupción, que quiere decir mundo bajo; llamaban Ucu Pacha al centro de la tierra, que quiere decir mundo inferior de allá abajo, donde decían que iban a parar los malos, y para declararlo más le daban otro nombre, que es Zupaipa Huacin, que quiere decir Casa del Demonio».)

~ Comentarios Reales de los Incas, Libro Segundo, Capítulo VII

In Garcilaso's quote, he explains that, for the natives, the world was divided into three universal planes. It is also worth noting that the comparison between these elements and the Christian trinity (Father, Son, and Holy Spirit) is palpable. This is even more evident when comparing Uku Pacha and its ruler, Supay, with hell and the devil, respectively. In fact, it was Inca Garcilaso who gave Uku Pacha a meaning similar to what many know as the "underworld."

Another point worth noting is the way Garcilaso describes what could be Kay Pacha (this world), as he calls it Hurin Pacha, which is commonly taken as a synonym for Uku Pacha. However, this would present a greater complexity than some scholars maintain.

== Underworld ==
The people of ancient Peru perceived a "second life" after death, which took place in the Hurin Pacha. Within the Andean worldview, the Hurin Pacha is an essential part of the cosmic structure, the inner plane of the earth, located below the Kay Pacha. Almost all accounts, both from the colonial period and the present day, also associate it with Supay, the devil, and darkness.

Accounts from the colonial period allow us to understand the Hurin Pacha as composed not of a single underworld, but of two. This monolithic perception is due, among other things, to the fact that the Hurin Pacha was identified with the Catholic concept of Hell. It has been suggested that assimilation, aside from being carried out by indigenous parish priests for a better understanding of Catholic doctrine, was studied in this way because the Hurin Pacha (underworld) is associated with chaos and disorder, in contrast to the forces of order and light. The Hurin Pacha was not conceived as a dwelling place for malevolent forces, but rather as a representation of fertility, wealth, and death, or a part of the whole. In some cases, due to the potential of the underworld, these forces could cause harm.

According to various sources, there was a bipartite perception of Hurin Pacha (the Andean underworld). On one side was an intra-terrestrial plane, a place of fertility, the Sun (as punchao), the Moon, and the animals of the night. This plane, in turn, was crossed by a sea. It is called Hurin Pacha in the chronicles. The first section of the underworld territory we can talk about was understood as a place of prosperity; moreover, thanks to the work of José María Arguedas, we know that there is a tree with "sweets" for deceased children. Taking this information into account, it is possible that children could have made a "journey" of sorts, accessing only the area where the tree was located, and then accessing the sky. On the other hand, there would be the plane of eternal darkness, where the greatest exponent of the night is located, the antagonistic form of celestial power and germinative power: the Uku Pacha.

Both terms, it seems, were confused in the chronicles and were possibly two terms that referred to parts of an intra-terrestrial world, but the data is unclear.

Likewise, there could have been many other names and elements that have been lost over time and through evangelization campaigns. An example of this is the fourth world called Hawa Pacha (outer world). This world would have been eradicated by the Spanish in their eagerness to standardize the cosmological conception of the Andean worlds with the aforementioned Christian trilogy.

=== The Journey Through the Underworld ===
In the texts, it is noted that Hurin pacha was dark, humid, but, moreover, it was an extension of the earthly plane, with which it was intimately connected.

With these denominations, we can observe that the interior of the earth was, in a way, linked to the interior of a body. That is to say, normally the segmentation of the universe, of any form-being-object that inhabits it, is linked to the segmentation of a living body: with its mouth, its limbs, etc. Similarly, the interior of the earth was perceived as a divided region. On one hand, there was an understood nearby, intrauterine region, which could be accessed from a cave, crack, or point of connection of the kay pacha. Place of transit for the deceased. And a more distant, abyssal region, where darkness and sterility reigned.

To access eternal rest, one had to cross a large body of water, a sea, lake, or river, a detail that matches in almost all the information from the colony. The lake that the deceased crosses possibly refers to the primordial water from which the Ordainer emerged, and by which it disappeared. In this way, the deceased undertook the same journey toward the amniotic fluid of the universe's placenta.

Likewise, it was understood that the deceased returned to the primordial waters, to the waters from which they were born, for, "...the amniotic waters that contain the fetus are cosmic, mystical, oceanic waters..."

In this way, it could be understood that the mythical primordial ocean is inside the earth, above the underworld. On the subject, Pedro Cieza de León noted the following:

"...And these Indians say that in the past they firmly believed that the souls that left the bodies went to a great lake, where their vain belief made them understand it was their beginning, and that there they entered the bodies of those who were born..." ("...Y cuentan estos indios que tuvieron en los tiempos pasados por cosa cierta que las ánimas que salían de los cuerpos iban a un gran lago, donde su vana creencia les hacía entender haber sido su principio, y que allí entraban en los cuerpos de los que nacían…")

— Crónica del Perú, Capitulo XCVII, página 307

There were several ways to cross, for example, some chroniclers noted that it was crossed by a bridge, a very narrow bridge of hair. The chronicler Pablo José de Arriaga wrote that in the mountains, the souls of the dead headed toward a land called Ypamarca:

"they say that before reaching a great river, they must cross a very narrow bridge made of hair, others say they must pass thru black dogs, and in some places they raised them, and they had the intention with this superstitious apprehension, and they all killed themselves." Others have the tradition that the souls of the deceased go where their Huacas are. The people of the town of Huacho and others from the coast say that they go to the Island of Huano and that they are taken there by sea lions, which they call tumi". ("dizen y que antes de llegar, a un grande río, que an de pasar por una puente de cabellos, muy estrecha, otros dizen que los an de pasar vnos perros negros, y en algunas partes los criavan, y tenían de propósito con esta supersticiosa aprehensión, y se mataron todos. Otros tiene por tradición que las almas de los defuntos van donde están sus Huacas. Los del pueblo de Huacho y los otros de la costa, dizen, que van a la Isla del Huano y que los llevan los lobos marinos, que ellos llaman tumi".)

— La extirpación de la idolatría en el Perú, Capitulo VII, página 41

Other chroniclers understood that the souls were helped by a caiman, others by a spider, in the information collected on the coast they say that the souls were helped by sea lions that transported them to a nearby island, the island of Huano. But, without a doubt, the animal that offered the greatest devotion for its help to the deceased was the dog.

=== Destinies of the deceased ===
In the dictionaries of Jesús Lara, Fray Diego González de Holguín, Lira, and Anonymous, the word supay is translated as shadow, illness, death, possessed, or crazy; among many other things. G. Taylor understands that Zamay, Supay, or Shapi has been misinterpreted since the colonial period, as it does not mean demon. The data points toward an argument different from the one established so far. The word would correspond to the definition of shadow. The information that has been deduced, with this new interpretation, is very valuable, as it is understood that the underworld was the world of darkness, of shadows. This information aligns with the hypothesis we are proposing, in which it was understood that one of the spiritual components that made up the human being was the shadow, without which a person would die, or rather, would depart to the world of shadows. It is also a definition that fits the text of Pablo José de Arriaga, who wrote that Zamay could be interpreted as the tomb of rest, and zamarcan was interpreted as dying. But, above all, with the definition of Zamayhuaci, "house of rest," the place where P. Arriaga places the eternal rest of souls. This "house," thru the writings of P. Arriaga, was located in the land of Ypamarca, Upaimarca, or Huarochaca, of which he wrote: "....that we can explain as the mute land or the land of the mute...". G. Taylor understands that Upaimarca derives from Supaymarca, therefore, it is not correct to interpret this word as the land of silence, but rather as the land of Supay, the land of the souls of the deceased, the shadows.

The data indicate that the deceased from the Lake Titicaca region headed toward Upaimarca and Yaromarca, the place of origin of the Sun and Liviac. Upaimarca, points out G. Taylor, corresponds to the "quechua I" of the Central Sierra, which is the same as Zamayhuaci, "house of rest," where P. Arriaga places the eternal rest of the souls. José M. Arguedas indicated that it was believed the dead went to the tops of the mountains, to the summit of Qoropuna.

In the writings of Huamán Poma de Ayala, it appears that five days after the deceased's death, their souls in the region of Chinchaysuyu and Andesuyu would head toward Caray Pampa, while the souls of Collasuyu and Condesuyu would head toward Caro Puna and Puquina pampa.

There are numerous allusions to the different representations that were established after death. Fernando Avendaño, for example, wrote the following:

"... the Hircas or high peaks are not gods... the sorcerers taught the Indians that upon reaching these Hircas, they should say: your Hirca defend me from the Fifth, which are the souls of the Indians who were killed in wars long ago; because the sorcerers said that these souls wander around there, and they also taught them to say: those who want to kill me do not pass here, and as a sign of worship, they offered the Hirca a twisted ichu rope with the left hand." ("… las Hircas o cumbres altas cerros no son dios...los hechiceros enseñaban a los indios, que en llegando a estas Hircas, les dijesen: tu Hirca defendedme de la Quinta, que son las almas de los indios, que antiguamente mataron en las guerras; porque decían los hechiceros, que estas almas andan por allí, y también enseñaban que les dijesen: los que me quieren matar no pasen de aquí, y en señal de adoración ofrecían a la Hirca una soga de ichu torcida con la mano izquierda".)

— Sermones de los misterios de nuestra santa fe catolica, en lengua castellana, y la general del Inca, Sermón V, página 56

The deceased bore the destiny granted to him according to his deeds, thus conceiving a highly complex relationship between life and death. If the deceased had been a warrior, it was understood that his soul dwelled in the mountain peaks.

It has been understood that there is a division regarding the fate of the deceased. The first division is based on the deeds and actions that the individual had performed in their life. If he had been an individual who contributed to the well-being of his family and community, he would have a better journey in the underworld. On the contrary, if this person had developed bad behavior, with evil and selfish acts, their fate would be dire.

"Some believed that, once the soul left the body, if it had lived well, it became a star, and that all the stars in the sky came from there, and that they enjoyed glory there. And if the life had been bad, it went to a certain place where it had perpetual punishment; where and how it was given also differed, and each one imagined what they wanted: because they had nothing fixed, settled, or obligatory in this, but, like people without light, they wandered and invented new things every day, according to human frailty". ("Algunos creían que, salida el alma del cuerpo, si había vivido bien, se hacía estrella, y que de allí procedían todas las del cielo, y que allí gozaban de gloria. Y si la vida había sido mala, Iba a cierto lugar donde tenía pena perpetua; la cual donde y como se la daban también discrepaban, y cada uno fingia lo que queria: porque no tenían en esto cosa fija ni asentada ni obligatoria, sino que, como gente sin lumbre, andaban vacilando e inventando cada día cosas nuevas, conforme a la flaqueza humana".)

— Historias del Nuevo Mundo: obras del padre Bernabé Cobo, Volumen II, capitulo III, página 154

The chronicler Bernabé Cobo in his chronicle History of the New World (1653), describes the beliefs of the Andean indigenous people about the fate of souls after death. He mentions the following:

"They were also convinced that there is a hell for the wicked, and that there the demons tormented them, whom they depicted as very ugly and terrifying. The place of hell, they said, is beneath the earth, and it is very narrow and cramped; and those who go there suffer from great hunger and thirst; and they make [those who are in hell] eat coals, snakes, toads, and other disgusting vermin, and drink murky and foul water; and that this alone sustains the souls of the damned, whose punishment they say is eternal". ("Asimismo estaban persuadidos a que hay infierno para los malos, y que alli los atormentaban los demonios, a quienes pintaban muy feos y espantables. El lugar del infierno decian estar debajo de tierra, y que es muy estrecho y apretado; y que los que alla van padecen mucha hambre y sed; y que les hacen [a los que están en el infierno] comer carbones, culebras, sapos y otras sabandijas asquerosas, y beber agua turbia y hedionda; y que de solo esto se mantienen las animas de los condenados, cuya pena dicen ser perpetua".)

— Historias del Nuevo Mundo: obras del padre Bernabé Cobo, Volumen II, capitulo III, página 154

According to the previous text, Bernabe Cobo would be describing the Uku Pacha (world of eternal darkness) and not the Hurin Pacha (Inca underworld) as such. The Spanish chroniclers (including Cobo) did not clearly distinguish and often confused these two terms, and they frequently used them interchangeably or simply translated them as "hell." However, according to modern research, ethnolinguistic and anthropological analyzes of the Andean worldview, this description is linked to Uku Pacha (the deepest and darkest part of the underworld) as the place of dire punishments, while Hurin Pacha encompasses a broader subterranean realm that includes positive aspects of fertility, transition, ancestors, and regeneration.

The data have shown us that the interior of the earth was perceived as a region with different zones; we do not know if it was divided into planes, or if, in a single zone, there were the underground passages, the rivers, the seas, etc.

On one hand, it was understood that the underworld had a strip that formed the sky of the Andean underworld. It was formed by lakes and bodies of water, it was a nearby region, accessible from a cave, crack, or point of connection of the kay pacha. This region-zone was a place of transit for the deceased. Another strip was composed of the space found between the underworld sky and the space thru which the deceased wandered. That is to say, in addition to the underworld sky, there was a place thru which the stars traveled in their underworld journey. Another region was the one that had roads, passages, bridges, and other dangers; it was the space traversed by the souls of the deceased. And a more distant, abyssal region, in which darkness and sterility reigned.

=== Upaymarka ===
In the Andean worldview, Upaymarka ("village of the shadows") is the world of the dead, an underworld where the shadows of the deceased begin a journey after death. This place is not one of total oblivion, but rather a space of transition and continuous reciprocity with the living.

The Upaymarka is an ancestral vision that transforms death into an active continuum, a profound recognition that the deceased have a life in the invisible, they have organization, inhabit another realm, and return in sacred moments to support and reunite with the living. It is not an eternal silence, but a different form of existence, full of meaning and connection.

"It is a arduous journey - says Dr. Rodolfo Sánchez - it requires the participation of a psychopomp (a being that guides souls to the afterlife) to take the souls to the boundaries of the village they belonged to." The shadows make a journey thru many towns until they reach the entrance to the underworld, which for many is found in the crater of the Qhoropuna volcano [Castilla province, Arequipa department], for others, in the Guaneras Islands. A mighty river often stands in the way of the shadows' journey. There is a point where one can cross with the help of a black dog, which is the alqochimpa. The animal that has been well treated recognizes the shadow and the help; otherwise, it lets it wander and cause distress to its loved ones.

When a person dies, they have to cross a bridge made of human hair which hangs over a great river of boiling blood to reach Upaymarka. The path they must take is inhabited by dangerous creatures that will attack the souls of the deceased to devour them. A dog (also called Tawi Ñawi) defends its owner from these creatures so that they can pass through peacefully until they reach the bridge that connects to Upaymarka.

The soul arrives at the village of the dogs (allqu llaqta), where it is believed that the spirits of the dogs live, some time after leaving the body. In some cases, but especially if the deceased mistreated dogs in life, they may receive the soul violently and try to attack it. If the soul is accompanied by the dog that was sacrificed at the funeral, it will try to protect it and help it cross to the other side of the river, lagoon, or sea that is next to the village.

However, if the soul arrives alone at the village of the dogs, it must obtain the help of one of the dogs there, which can pose some difficulty. Once a black dog willing to offer its help is found, it must carry the soul either on its back, or in its nose or ear, across the water. The preference for black dogs is mentioned in many of the stories because they are the ones who are usually willing to carry the soul across the river (Map’a mayo), while the white ones refuse to do so for fear of dirtying their fur.

== Mythology ==
=== Myth of Lago Titicaca ===
In this myth, Supay is responsible for causing the flood, which later gave rise to Lake Titicaca.

The myth tells that Lake Titicaca was once a fertile valley populated by people who lived happily in peace and harmony. They lacked nothing; the land was rich and provided them with everything they needed. Death, hatred, and ambition were unknown in this land. The Apus, the gods of the mountains, protected these human beings. They imposed only one condition: no one was allowed to climb to the top of the mountains where the Sacred Fire burned.

For a long time, the people who lived in the valley did not think of breaking this order from the gods. But the Supay (or Auka), an evil spirit condemned to live in darkness, could not bear to see these people living so peacefully in the valley. He devised a plan to divide the men by sowing discord. Using trickery, he managed to get the people to disobey their gods and follow the path of curiosity, to find the Sacred Fire at the top of the mountains.

Then one fine day, at dawn, these people disobeyed and began to climb to the top of the mountains, although halfway up they were surprised by the Apus.

The Apus realized that the men had disobeyed and decided to exterminate them. Thousands of pumas appeared, at the command of the Apus, to devour those who had attempted to reach the sacred fire. Fleeing in terror, they begged Supay for help, but he remained unmoved by their pleas. They all died for their audacity.

Seeing this, Inti, the sun god, began to cry. His tears were so abundant that they formed a flood that lasted forty days.

Only one man and one woman were saved on a reed boat. Once the flood was over, the man and woman could not believe their eyes. Under the pure blue sky, they were in the middle of an immense lake. Floating in the water were the pumas, drowned and transformed into stone statues.

This is where the name Lake Titicaca comes from, although the correct name would be "Titekjarka," which comes from Tite (puma) and Kjarka (rock), and which translated into Spanish means: The lake of the stone pumas. When the Spanish arrived at the lake, they couldn't pronounce its name correctly and called it Titicaca.

=== The Tawa Ñawi and the Journey to the Underworld ===
During the Inca Empire, there was a tradition known as Rutuy Chicuy (first haircut).

First, at the first haircut, the godparents kept the hair in a special place, as they believed that when the godson died, the hair would form a bridge so that the spirit, once it entered Hurin Pacha (the underworld), could cross a river called Yawar Mayu (river of blood) and thus reach Upay Marca (land or village of shadows), where the spirits dwelled. The soul of the deceased, in turn, is guided by an animal (it can be various, but it is usually a black dog) so that the soul can accomplish its purpose.

This belief has various interpretations and testimonies that allude to it. Likewise, the dog that guides these souls is known as Tawa Ñawi (four eyes) because of its eyebrows, which are perceived as if they were two additional eyes.

Currently, in certain Andean regions, this belief still prevails.

=== Kawsay and Supay ===
In the Andean world, the future is not something that simply arrives, and the past is not something that accumulates behind. In this sense, it is the runa (human being) who comes from the future and goes toward the past, where it is believed that the chaos that is at rest will resurface, and the present disorder will inevitably erupt, resulting in a new pachakutik (Andean cycle) that will restore cosmic balance. As a result, the Andean conception of cyclical time revives history as infinite reversals of power between kawsay (life) and supay (death). Five Andean cycles are known, each lasting 500 years. The fifth pachakutik (2000-2500) represents the hope for liberation and the restoration of the past cosmic order.

Another key principle of Andean philosophy is yanantin (complementary duality). According to this principle, life expands continuously and infinitely through the existence and interaction of two forces, which do not attempt to annul or eliminate one another, but rather encourage and propel their opposition, that is, their difference. It is precisely this opposition that energizes life. Positive and negative are necessary; it is not simply a matter of eradicating evil, but of maintaining balance. Cosmic order depends on the existence of this opposition, since for the Andean peoples, balance always occurs in the tinkuy (encounter) between two proportional and, therefore, complementary polarities. The constant exposure to the interplay of difference, that is, the mediation of the contradictions of complementary opposites, is integral to the productive and desirable condition of life. It is important to emphasize that the runa, the one guided by reason and emotion, cannot exist unless he or she is constructed by the other. This means that the runa (indigenous person) is not only a sentient being in relation to themselves, but also in relation to their yanantin (indigenous community), their ayllu (family), and their ayllullakta (community), for it is there that the social fabric is forged, linking them to the Andean cosmic network.

Furthermore, evidence of the yanantin concept is evident in various architectural structures (sunken plazas, circular and square enclosures, semi-underground temples) and symbols such as the chakana (stairway). Furthermore, there are numerous complementary dualities present in daily life, such as: male-female, sun-moon, day-night, tayta-mama, up-down, light-darkness, kawsay-supay, hanan-hurin, etc.

== Modern Andean-Christian belief ==
The name Supay is now roughly translated into diablo (Spanish for devil) in most Southern American countries.

Some commentary regards the Supay as a single God of Death of the Uku Pacha (inner world), the "god of the mountains", or "the spirit or god who lived in the earth".

What appears to be the case is there is conflation between the Supay, regarded as a trickster deity, and El Tío (q.v.), the Bolivian god of the underworld and the mines. While scholarly argument postulates Tío to have been a sort of Spanish invented frightening god/boogeyman and thus a corruption of Dios, the popular notion is that the miners avoid the derogatory supay and call him Tío, or "uncle". (Note: Urban and Sherzer 1991 apud Bonilla) The name is sometimes concatenated as "Tío Supay" or "Uncle Supay". (Note: Some miners who claimed to have seen him said he was a small man who smelled of sulfur, and accused him of pranks like hiding the miner's coca or his essentially tools.)

It has been commented that in the early 20th century, the Aymara were more prone to worship the Supay akin to old tradition, and the Quechua more likely to regard it as a disgusting creature.

In some areas of Peru, where the cult of the Virgin of Candelaria is celebrated, she became controller of lightning who frightens away the devilish Supay (early 20th century). This Catholic Virgin Mother is the Pachamama's counterpart, just as the Devil is the replacement for Supay.

== Mining communities ==
Supay is given original meaning in the miner's communities, with Tío or Supay recognized as the lord of the mines, sometimes conflated together into figure of Tío Supay, as already discussed. And the Virgin of the Mineshaft (Virgen del Socavón) is the mining communities' alias of the Virgin of Candelaria previously discussed.

In Oruro, Bolivia, the Carnaval de Oruro features the diablada dance with the Supay cast in the role of its most important devil (Note: It is not clear if the star of the dance really names himself the Supay as Perrin seems to suggest. Otherliterature refer to Lucifer and Satan appearing, both symbolizing El Tío.) The carnival dance may also feature the china supay or "she-devils" of overtly sexual nature that used to be performed by men.

In the miners' lore, Tío was the king of the underground (rey de lo subterráneo), and Chinasupay the she-devil his wife, according to Victor Montoya, and he sees some parallels with the Hades-Persephone myth here.

== Retablos ==
Vintage Andean household altars or retablos typically depicted two of the aforementioned three worlds, but more recent altars depict all three, with the lowest floor, Uku Pacha, of the lost souls of the deceased and demonical beings. The supay-devils are portrayed as goat-men with wings and long claws on hands and hind feet. There are also winged angels depicted, but the indigenous faith regards this not so much as the battle between good and evil but as striking balance between natural forces. (Note: Strong, citing Millones, Luis (2004), Dioses familiares p. 194.)

== In popular culture ==
In an early draft of the unproduced Disney animated film Kingdom of the Sun, the villainous witch Yzma intends to summon Supay and destroy the sun, so that she could stay young and beautiful forever, but her plans are thwarted at the end. This plot element was scrapped and the film was heavily rewritten, eventually becoming The Emperor's New Groove (2000).

== See also ==
- Huari (deity) - deity of the Huaris
- psychopomp
- Saqra
