= Diablada =

Andean folk dance

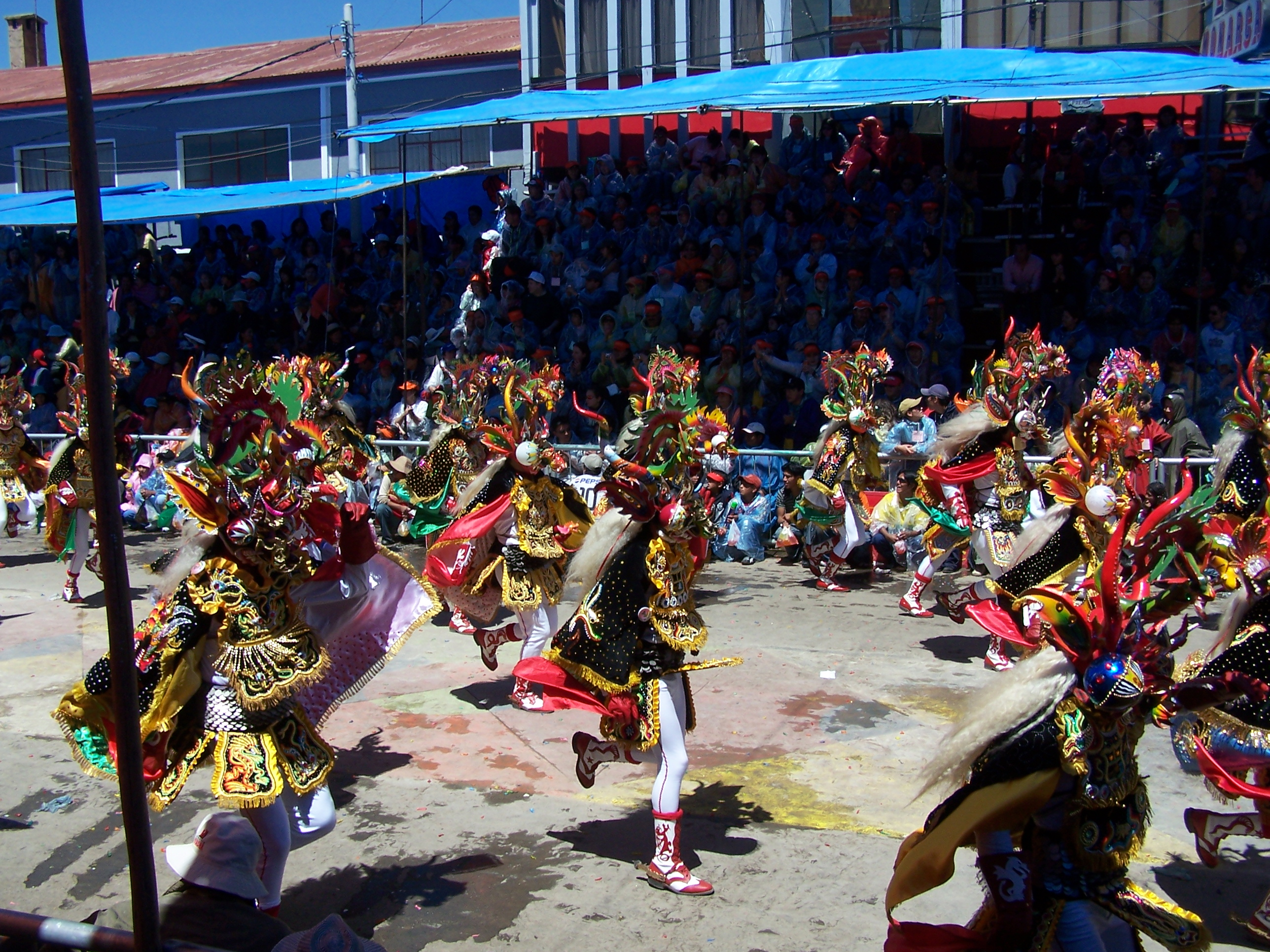
- A Diablada dance squad passing through the streets during the Oruro Carnival.
- Genre: Folk dance
- Inventor: Oruro, Bolivia Andean civilizations
- Year: 1500s
- Origin: Socavón mines Oruro, Bolivia, South America

The Diablada, also known as the Danza de los Diablos (English: Dance of the Devils) is a Bolivian folk dance, characterized by performers wearing masks and costumes representing the devil, and characters from post-colonial theology and mythology combined with Spanish and Christian elements added during the colonial era. Some scholars have concluded that the dance is descended from the Llama llama dance in honor of the Uru god Tiw, the Aymaran ritual to the demon Anchanchu and El Tío.

It originated in 1789 in the Oruro’s Socavón mines, where performers dressed like the devil in parades (led by San Miguel Archangel) called Diabladas. The first organized Diablada group with defined music and choreography appeared in Bolivia in 1904. There is also some evidence of the dance originating among miners in Potosí. Regional dances have been influenced in Peru and Chile’s modern versions.

== History ==
=== Pre-Columbian origins ===
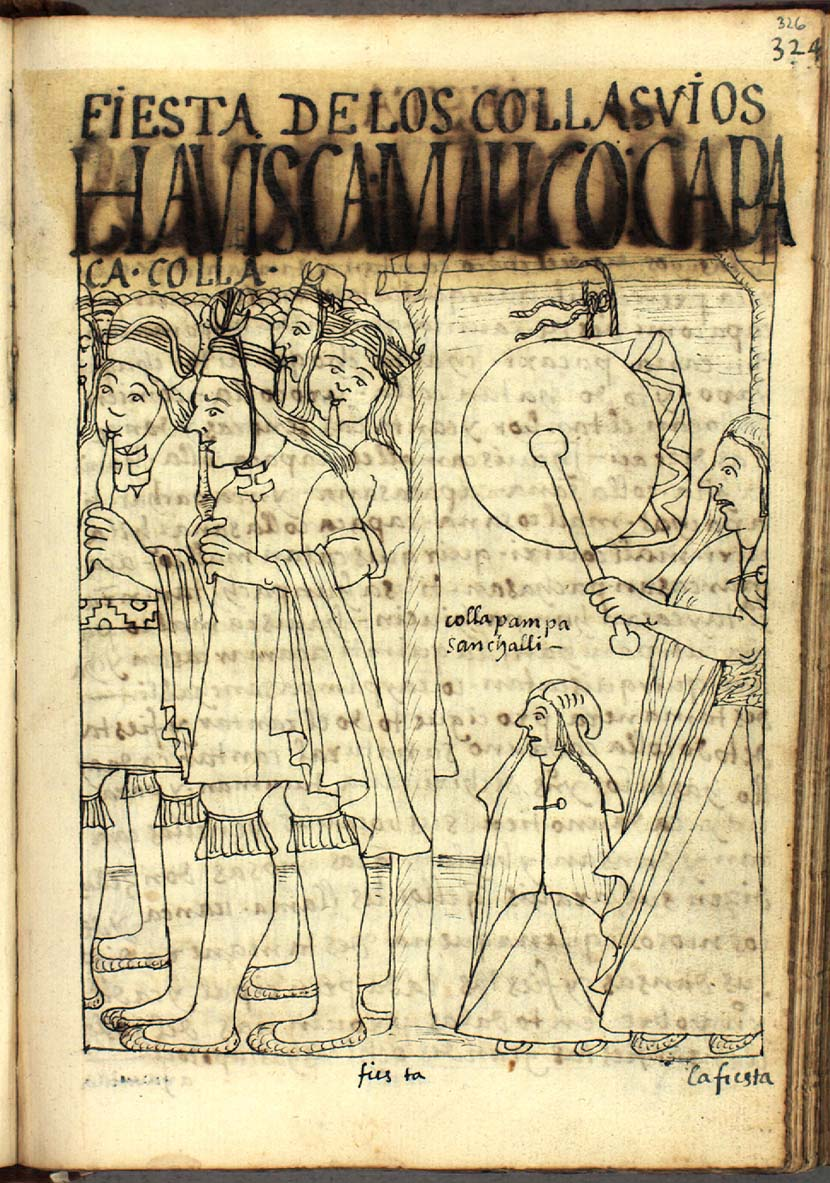
Depiction of a Collasuyu party in the 17th century book Primer Nueva Corónica y Buen Gobierno of Felipe Guamán Poma de Ayala.

Historians claim that the Diablada originated in Bolivia, and that should be named as its place of origin under the Masterpieces of the Oral and Intangible Heritage of Humanity policy promoted by UNESCO; has also claimed that performances of the dance in other countries are cultural appropriation. Bolivian historians currently maintain that the Diablada dates back 2000 years to the rituals of the Uru civilization dedicated to the mythological figure Tiw, who protected caves, lakes, and rivers as places of shelter. The dance is believed to have originated as the Llama llama in the ancient settlement of Oruro, which was one of the major centers of the Uru civilization. The dance includes references to animals that appear in Uru mythology such as ants, lizards, toads, and snakes. Bolivian anthropologist Milton Eyzaguirre adds that the ancient cultures of the Bolivian Andes practiced a death cult called cupay, with that term eventually evolving into supay or the devil figure in the modern Diablada.

Due to syncretism caused by Spanish influence in later centuries, Tiw was eventually associated with the devil “El Tío” (the Uncle) protects the underworld Socavón mines in Oruro; Spanish authorities also outlawed several of the ancient traditions but incorporated others into Christian theology. Local and regional Diablada festivals arose during the Spanish colonial period and were eventually consolidated as the Carnaval de Oruro in the modern city of that name.

...The Spanish banned these ceremonies in the seventeenth century, but they continued under the guise of Christian liturgy: the Andean gods were concealed behind Christian icons and the Andean divinities became the Saints. The Ito festival was transformed into a Christian ritual, celebrated on Candlemas (2 February). The traditional llama llama or diablada in worship of the Uru god Tiw became the main dance at the Carnival of Oruro....

— Proclamation of "Masterpiece of Oral and Intangible Heritage of Humanity" to the "Carnival of Oruro", UNESCO 2001

Chilean and Peruvian organizations suggest that since the dance has roots in Andean civilizations that existed before the formation of the current national borders, it should belong equally to the three nations. Some Chilean historians concede that the Diablada originated in Bolivia and was adopted for Chile's Fiesta de La Tirana in 1952, though it is also influenced by a similar 16th century Chilean tradition called Diablos sueltos.

Some Peruvian historians also concede that the dance originated in Bolivia but was influenced by earlier traditions practiced across the Altiplano region, including some specific to Peru. The Peruvian version, Diablada puneña, originated in the late 1500s among the Lupaka people in the Puno region, who in turn were influenced by the Jesuits; with that dance merging with the original Bolivian version. Scholars who defend the Diablada's origins in Peru cite Aymaran traditions surrounding the deity Anchanchu that had been documented by 16th century historian Inca Garcilaso de la Vega. There is also a version of the Diablada in Ecuador called the Diablada pillareña.

=== Spanish influence ===
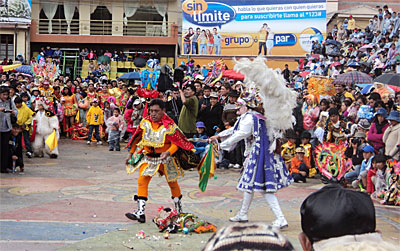
"Struggle of the Diablada" as performed during the Carnival of Oruro.

Some historians have theorized that the modern Diablada exhibits influences from Spanish dance traditions. In her book La danza de los diablos, Julia Elena Fortún proposed a connection with the Catalan entremés called Ball de diables as performed in the Catalonian communities of Penedès and Tarragona. That dance depicts a struggle between Lucifer and the archangel Saint Michael and is first known to have been performed in 1150. Catalan scholar Jordi Rius i Mercade has also found similarities between the Ball de diables and several Andean dances including the similarly themed Baile de Diablos de Cobán in Guatemala and Danza de los diablicos de Túcume in Peru.

Those theories contradict the more common theory that the modern Diablada is most influenced by the Spanish practice of autos sacramentales during which the colonizers introduced Christianity to the natives of the Andes, due to differing conceptions of the devil and his temptations. The autos sacramentales process has been cited as an influence on the emergence of the Diablada puneña in Peru, shortly after the Spanish conquest of the Inca Empire, as believed by Garcilaso de la Vega. Peruvian scholar Nicomedes Santa Cruz and Bolivian anthropologist Freddy Arancibia Andrade have suggested a similar process, with the dance originating among miners who rebelled against the Spanish at Potosi in 1538 while combining the ancient ritual of Tinku with Christian references. Andrade has also proposed a similar process among striking miners in 1904 as the origin of the modern version of the Diablada.

=== Post-independence period ===
Though the traditions of the Diablada were merged with Christianity during the colonial period, the meanings of the original traditions were revived and reassessed during the Latin American wars of independence. The Altiplano region, particularly around Lake Titicaca, became a center of appreciation for pre-Columbian dance and music. During the Bolivian War of Independence, the main religious festival honoring the Virgin of the Candlemas was replaced by Carnival, which allowed for greater acknowledgement of pre-Christian traditions including the Diablada. The present annual Diablada festival was established in Oruro by 1891.

The first institutionalized Diablada dance squad was the Gran Tradicional y Auténtica Diablada Oruro, founded in Bolivia in 1904 by Pedro Pablo Corrales. That squad established a counterpart called the Los Vaporinos in Peru in 1918. A squad from Bolivia was invited to travel to the Fiesta de la Tirana in Chile in 1956, and that country's first established squad was called Primera Diablada Servidores Virgen del Carmen, centered in Iquique. In 2001, the Carnaval de Oruro was declared one of the Masterpieces of the Oral and Intangible Heritage of Humanity, along with the Diablada and 19 other dances performed at the festival. In 2004, the Bolivian government awarded high national honors to the Gran Tradicional y Auténtica Diablada Oruro for its 100th anniversary.

== Choreography ==
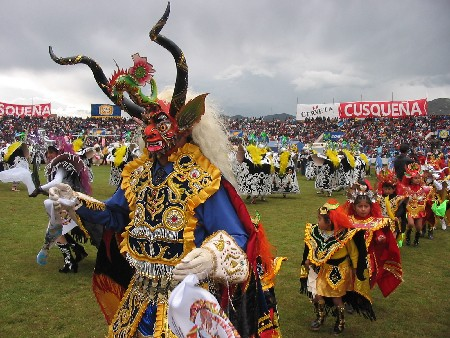
Diablada dancers in Puno, Peru.

In its original form, the dance was performed with music by a band of Sikuris, who played the siku. In modern times the dance is accompanied by an orchestra. Dancers often perform on streets and public squares, but the ritual can also be performed at indoor theaters and arenas. The ritual begins with a krewe featuring Lucifer and Satan with several China Supay, or devil women. They are followed by the personified seven deadly sins of pride, greed, lust, anger, gluttony, envy, and sloth. Afterwards, a troop of devils come out. They are all led by Saint Michael, with a blouse, short skirt, sword, and shield. During the dance, angels and demons move continuously. This confrontation between the two sides is eclipsed when Saint Michael appears and defeats the Devil. The choreography has three versions, each consisting of seven moves.

== Music ==
1862 partiture of a Diablada tune named Déjame by the composer Froilán Zevillano of the Poopó Province in Oruro, Bolivia.

The music associated with the dance has two parts: the first is known as the March and the second one is known as the Devil's Mecapaqueña. Some squads play only one melody or start the Mecapaqueña in the fourth movement "by four". Since the second half of the 20th century, dialogue is omitted so the focus is only on the dance.

== Regional variations ==
=== Diablada Puneña (Peru) ===
Diablos from Puno, Peru.

The Diablada Puneña originated in Peru with the in the Lupaka people in 1576, when they combined tenets of Christianity from the autos sacramentales with ancient Aymara traditions.[4][23] Some additional influences from the cult of the Virgin Mary were added in the following century.[22]

The costumes used in the Peruvian Diablata also include influences from Tibet as well as elements from pre-Columbian Peruvian cultures such as Sechin, Chavin, Nazca, and Mochica.[4] Homegrown masks were produced and sold in Peru starting in 1956.[40] Music for the dance was originally performed on the siku,[41] but that was later replaced by percussionists known as Sicu-Morenos.[39]>

=== Fiesta de La Tirana (Chile) ===
In Chile, the Diablada is performed during the Fiesta de La Tirana in the northern region of that country. The festival attracts more than 100,000 visitors annually to the small village of La Tirana. The festival is descended from the celebrations for the Virgin of Carmen that began in 1540.

=== Diablada de Pillaro (Ecuador) ===
One of the theories about the Diablada de Pillaro (loosely translated as the "Devilish meet of Pillaro") origin says that it was born as a rebellion from the lower classes against the ruling invaders and the Church.

== See also ==
- Carnaval de Oruro
- Fiesta de la Candelaria
- Fiesta de La Tirana
