= Tiw (Uru god) =

Pre-Incan deity

Tiw, in Uru mythology, is a protector of mines, lakes, and rivers. It is closely related to the Aymara deity of Anchanchu, a terrible demon which haunts caves, rivers, and other isolated places.

It was traditionally honored with the diablada.

== See also ==
- El Tío
