= Pedro Gamboni =

Chilean chemical engineer

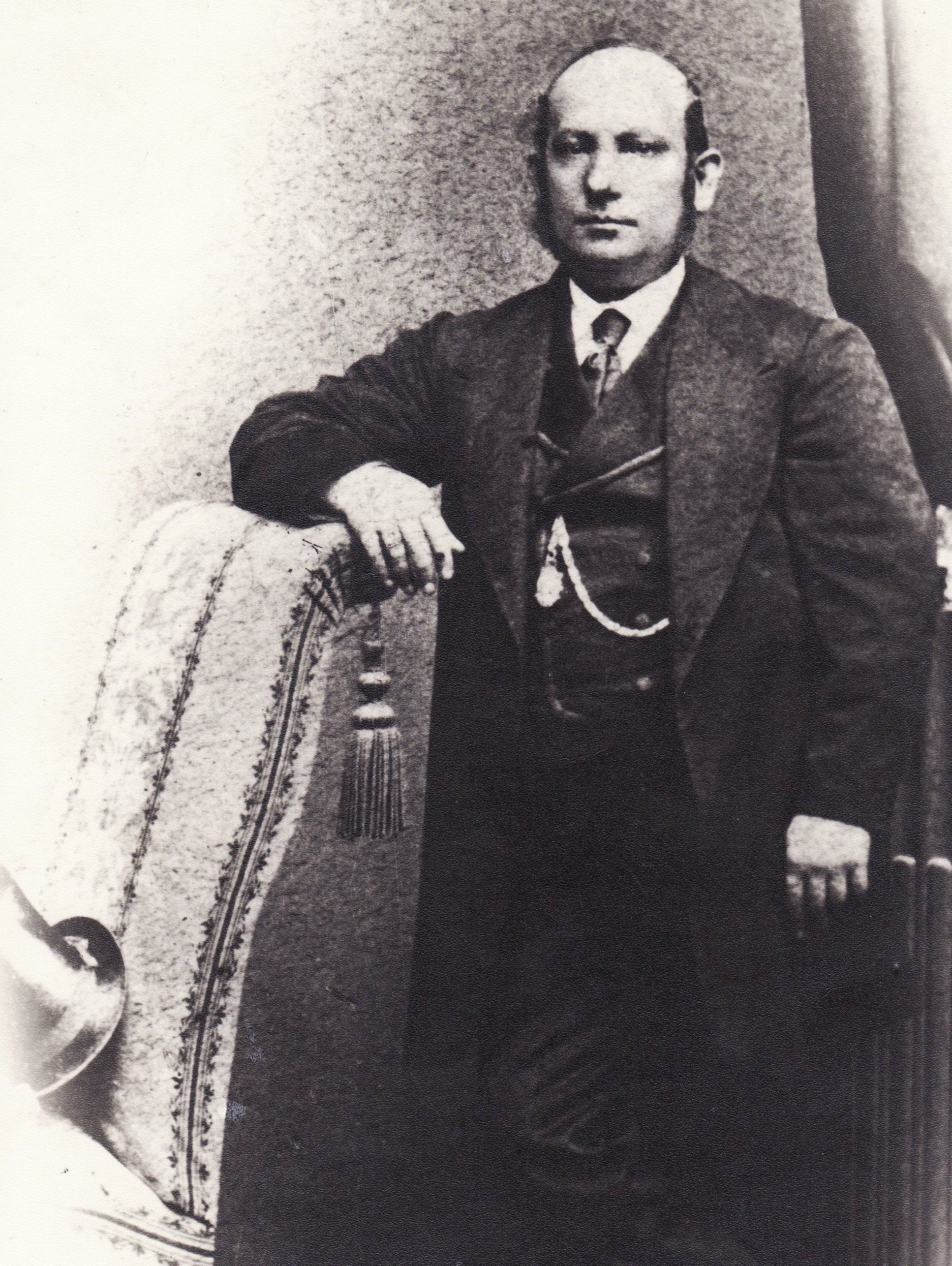
Pedro Gamboni

Pedro Gamboni (September 26, 1825 - December 27, 1895) was a Chilean chemical engineer who did important studies related to saltpeter and iodine in the regions of Tarapaca and Antofagasta.Gamboni invented a new method to extract nitrate from caliche leading to the phasing out of the older firewood and labour intensive paradas method in the 1850s.
