= Paradas method =

Process to extract nitrate from caliche by leaching

The paradas method (Spanish: método de paradas, sistema de paradas) was a process to extract nitrate from caliche by leaching. In this method caliche was boiled in water in large pans called "paradas". It was a firewood and labour-intensive process, and it required the frequent relocation of the mining camps. The paradas method was phased out in the 1850s by a new system invented by Pedro Gamboni which required less fuel and labour.

The paradas method led to a massive deforestation of Pampa del Tamarugal around La Tirana and Canchones and some areas to the south of these localities.
