= Yanantin =

Characteristic of Andean philosophy

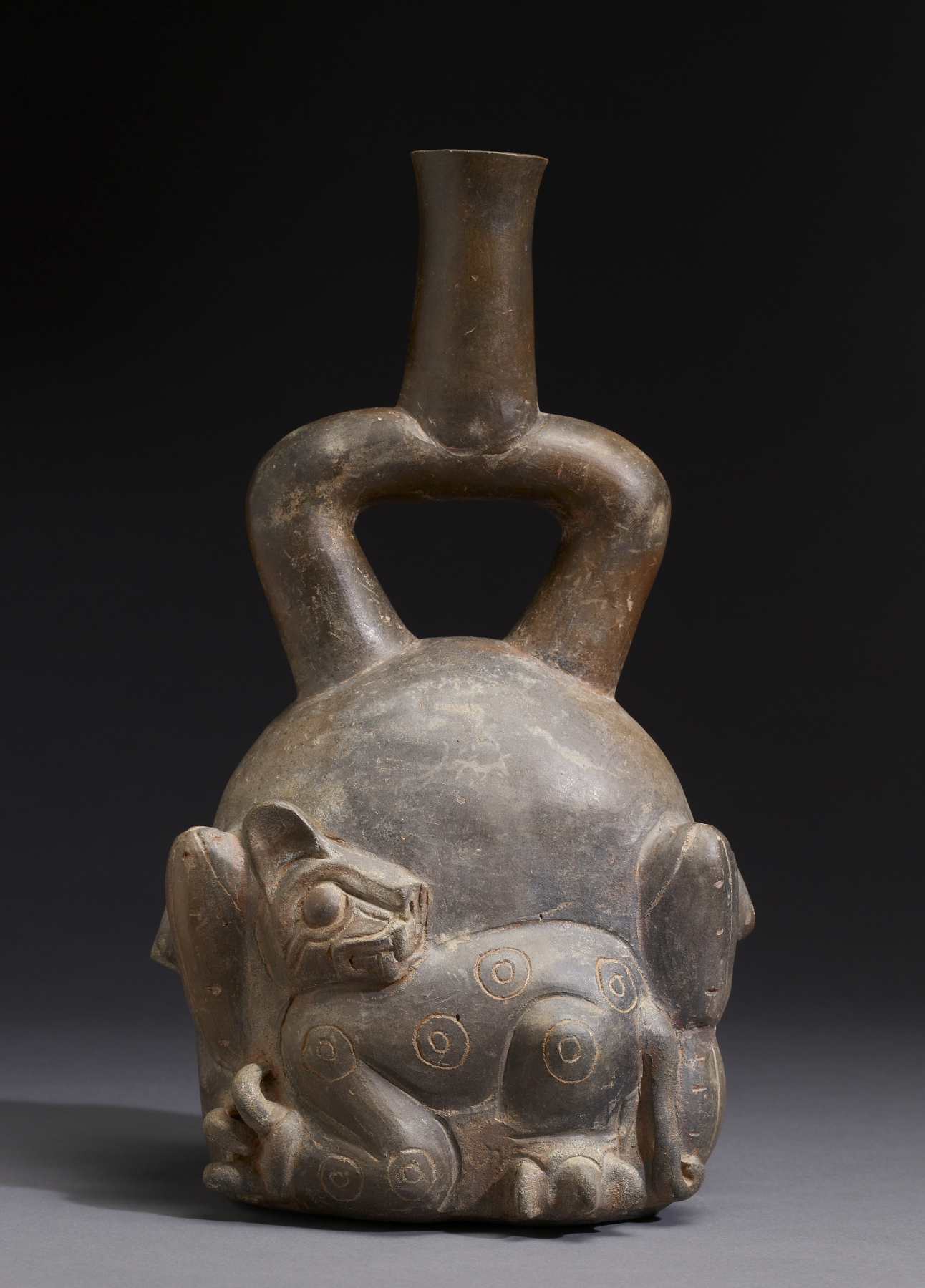
Visualization of dualism in Chavín culture

Yanantin is one of the defining characteristics of native Andean thought and exemplifies Andean adherence to a philosophical model based in what is often referred to as a "dualism of complementary terms" or, simply, a “complementary dualism". Much like in Chinese Taoism, Andean philosophy views the opposites of existence (such as male/female, dark/light, inner/outer) as interdependent and essential parts of a harmonious whole. Because existence itself is believed to be dependent upon the tension and balanced interchange between the polarities, there is a very definite ideological and practical commitment within indigenous Andean life to bringing the seemingly conflicting opposites into harmony with one another without destroying or altering either one. Among the Indigenous people of Peru and Bolivia, the union of opposing yet interdependent energies is called yanantin or "complementary opposites."

== Etymology ==
In the Quechua language, the prefix yana- means ”help,” while its suffix -ntin means “inclusive in nature, with implications of totality, spatial inclusion of one thing in another, or identification of two elements as members of the same category". Put together, yanantin has been translated as “the complement of difference.” However, according to some Andeans:

For us, yanantin doesn’t focus on the differences between two beings. That is what disconnects them. Instead, we focus on the qualities that brought them together. That is yanantin. We don’t really see the differences. That’s why we see them as not necessarily opposed, but as complementary. One on its own can’t hold everything, can’t take care of everything. Not only are they great together, but they need to be together. There is no other way. When there is another, it represents extra strength for both.

Some scholars break down the word yanantin slightly differently, translating yana- as “black” in the sense of “dark” or “obscure,” and contrast it to “light” (rather than in the sense of “black” as opposed to “white”).

== Relevance to indigenous Andean life ==
Because the relationship of opposites as a harmonious partnership is considered the primary organizing principle of creation, yanantin infuses all aspects of social and spiritual life within the indigenous Andean worldview. Platt (1986) cited two examples of yanantin from his work with the Macha of Bolivia. When drinks are served, the Macha pour a few drops on the ground as an offering, while at the same time speaking the name of the receiving divinity. This is done twice. “This is explained as being yanantin, for the conjugal pair”. When coca leaves (the most sacred plant of the Andes and an integral part of almost all indigenous ceremonies) are offered to a participant in a ritual, two handfuls are offered to each person, who receives them in two cupped hands. Platt (1986) wrote, “In all such cases, the pairing and the repetitions are explained as being yanantin." In Yanantin and Masintin in the Andean World, Hillary Webb notes that the relationship between entities or energies is the essential component within indigenous Andean worldview, involving, “the relationship, the alliance, the meeting, and the unity between two beings." Yanantin contrasts with chhulla, which refers to something that is unequal or odd—“one of things which should be twice." According to Vasquez (1998), the Quechua of Cajamarca say that something that is incomplete is referred to as chuya [alternate spelling], meaning “the one who is missing its other." Vasquez explained, ”In order to be whole, one has to pair up." Whether something is paired or unpaired is an important distinction within the Andean cosmovision. Regina Harrison noted, “Quechua speakers persistently distinguish objects which are not well matched or ‘equal’. According to Platt, yanantin is the act of rendering equal two things that were once unequal—what he calls “the correction of inequalities." Likewise, some indigenous Andeans believe the following.

… [U]npartnered people are missing an important part of them. They say that when you don’t have a partner, you are only half of a being. Alone, you are precious, you are unique, but you are only part. You are not whole yet. This is because when you are by yourself, you are either accumulating so much that it is overwhelming or you are draining yourself so much that you become weak. Because of that, you will feel fear or confused or lost. … you may know yourself, but you can never see yourself. For that you need another person. You need other eyes, another perspective to see that. When you are a child, you have your parents, but when you become older you no longer have your parents to see you, to recognize you. As an adult, your yanantin, your partner, is the person who is there to see what you don’t see in yourself, just as you are there to see in that person what he doesn’t see in himself. That is why it is easier to take care of another person than of yourself—because you are not supposed to take care of yourself! For that, there is the other person.

It has thus been implied that a perfect yanantin relationship is achieved when two energies are brought into harmony. Among the Macha, Platt explained, “The elements to be paired must first be ‘pared’ to achieve the ‘perfect fit.’ Here the crucial notion is that of the sharing of boundaries in order to create a harmonious co-existence."

== Masintin ==
The Quechua word masintin is often used in tandem with yanantin, as in yanantin-masintin. This indicates the process by which the yanantin pair becomes “pared” in Platt's terms, or harmonized to achieve a perfect fit. Webb's research participants described masintin as, “the process, the experience of that yanantin relationship.”

Masintin is what is materialized. It is what is self realized, not what stays in theory. Masintin is to enter into the spirit and the essence of anything, of the thing. Of what has been materialized. Of what has been imagined. You must enter into the spirit of it. Masintin is to create, recreate, and procreate.

== See also ==
- Pacha
- Quechua people
- Apachita (Puno)
