= El Tío =

Bolivian mine guardian deity

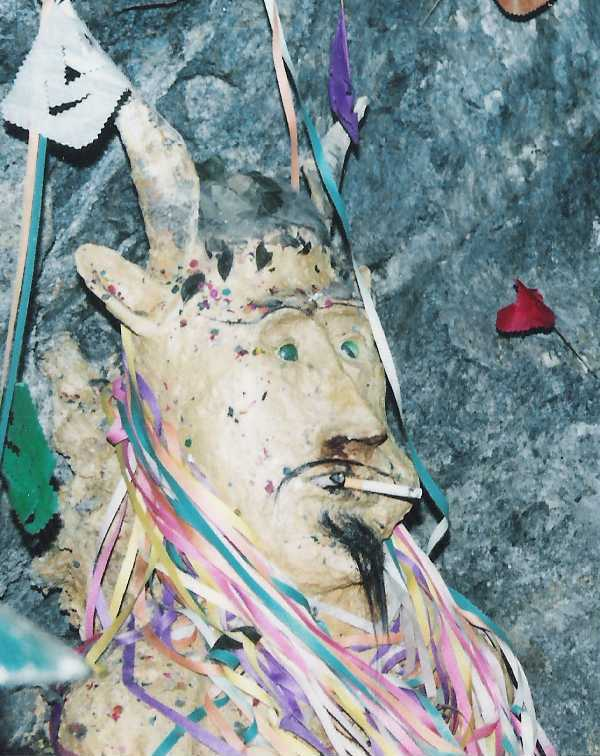
- A Figure of El Tío in Potosí mines, Bolivia, 1993

Creature information
- Grouping: Mining Spirit
- Similar entities: muki in the Central Andes

Origin
- Country: Bolivia
- Habitat: Mines

El Tío (Spanish for "The Uncle") is the legendary Lord of the Underworld and protector of the mine in the folklore and religion of the mining society of Bolivia, especially the silver mine of Cerro Rico, Potosí, Bolivia, but also the whole Altiplano region extending to neighboring countries.

== Nomenclature ==
The distinction between El Tío and the Supay (≒"devil" (Note: A supay, literally "shadow", originally designated the dead who wanders into the world of the living, and though it may be trying to "gather companions", is not seen as evil; and may possibly counsel the living on proper conduct in order to gain a peaceful death.)) of the mines is ambiguous. He is also called by the combined form "Tío Supay" or "Uncle Supay".

== Origins ==
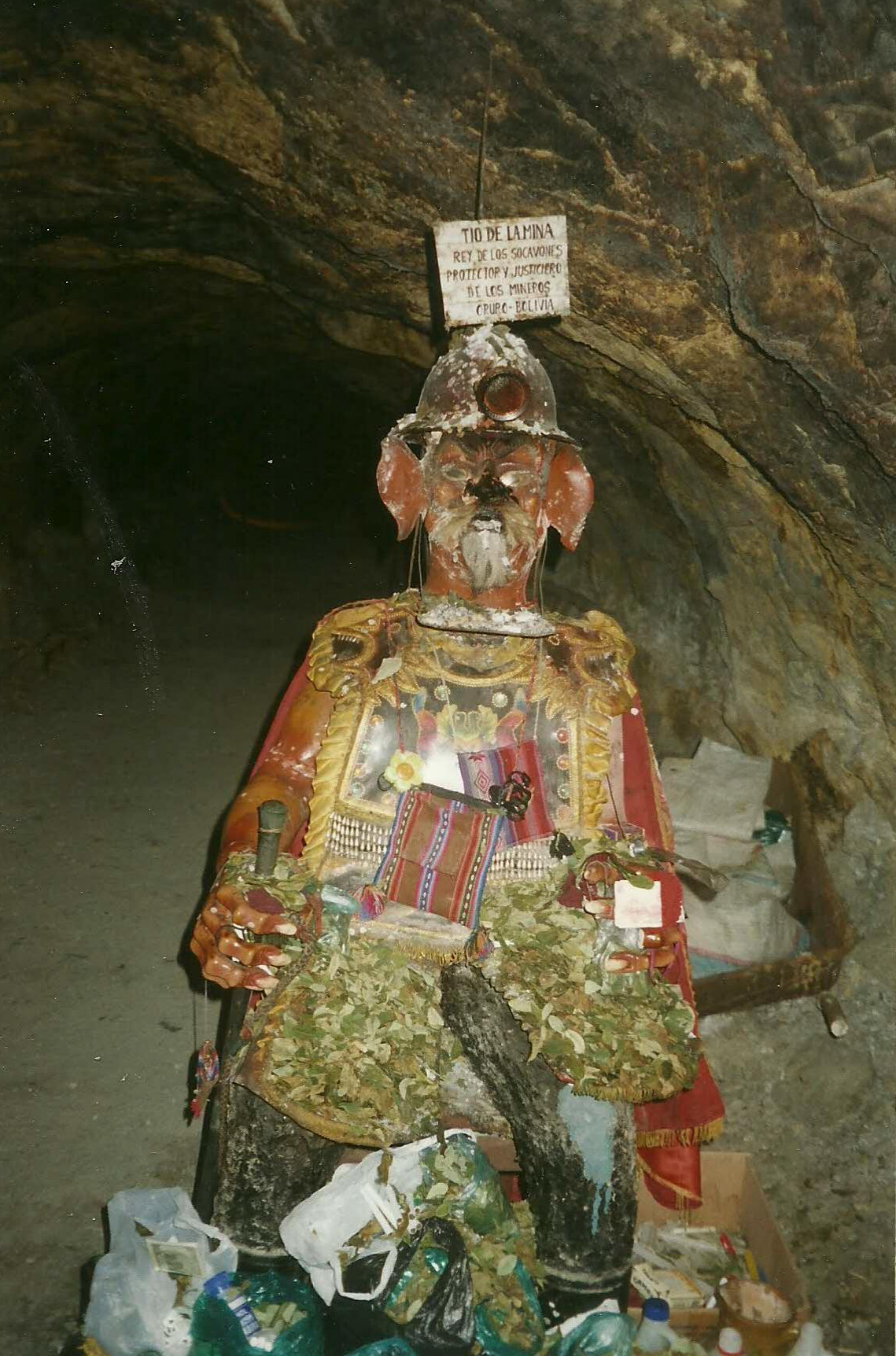
An idol to El Tio in Oruro, Bolivia

El Tío is the legendary religious figures held in awe in all the mines in Bolivia, a sort of demon and also a guardian spirit of the mines.

A simpler origin theory in terms of Supay is that the Spaniards, in order to discourage natives who kept venerating it, gave it sinister attributes of the devil, such as horns, but the natives adapted.

A different interpretation holds that it originated with the colonial Spaniards in order to motivate the mitayuq (conscripted laborers (Note: While Quechua: mit'a is glossed as "shift", other sources makes it clear it designates a corvée laborer who supplies the mita shift service.)) by threat of this devil-in-disguise deity (with horns and erect penis) overwatching them to work hard. Because the Quechua-Aymara languages had no "D", Spanish Dios for "God" got corrupted to Tío.

== General description ==
El Tío is described in shorthand as "lord of the underworld" or "king of the underground" (rey de lo subterráneo), and is the dispenser of both protection and destruction to the miners. The Supay of the mines is also described as "master/owner of the underground" (dueño de lo subterráneo).

In Potosí, the natives came to consider the cerro mine an apacheta lit. "stone cairn", where the gods manifest their power. The miners would not enter into the mineshafts until they performed a series of rituals, or were protected by all sorts of amulets. Miners put up rude statues of El Tío in front of the mineshafts, and make offerings and greet the statue before entering.

=== Offering ritual ===
There are now hundreds of such statues in the mines of Cerro Rico, the typical statue being a bulging-eyed and horned devil, or in the shape of a goat representing the Devil. Miners leave offerings of tobacco (cigars), liquor (bottles of aguardiente), or coca leaves to this devil, in hopes that he will spare their lives. In the present day, the miners give a different menu of offerings, of coca, hand-rolled cigarettes, and whiter rum on Tuesdays and Fridays. And on carnival Tuesday, the miners perform the challa ritual, spilling chicha or other liquor in the earth, and adorning the El Tío effigy with garlands of confetti (cf. photo above). (Note: Fernández Juárez, Gerardo (2000) "El culto al “tío” en las minas bolivianas". Cuadernos Hispanoamericanos (597), p. 30 apud Bonilla.)

The sacrifice to Supay, called k’araku falls on August, where a camelid (llama or alpaca) is sacrificed. In the version attended by June Nash in 1970, two llamas were slaughtered, the yatiri, pronounced prayers for safety over the blood caught in the basin, and buried the hearts. (Note: Nash comments that k’araku had been "in abeyance" since the military occupation of the mines (1965).) Later versions "blood is splashed on the threshold and walls of the mine" or, the fuel-drenched on a cart is set on fire.

El Tío was believed to reward those who paid homage to the statue, and to punish those who dared to mock the figure. The offerings and the men expending energy in the mine are understood to maintain its vital sources, otherwise, the mine will collapse; but it is also understood as a fact of life that El Tío will sometimes claim lives no matter what (through such collapse accidents) in order to restock this energy.

Or if something were to be blamed for a mine collapse, it would be a miner violating a taboo, such as the prohibition, such as eating in the mine, eating salty food before entering, or bringing a woman into the mines. For El Tío despised anyone wearing a skirt, whether it be clergymen or women. The practice of offering to El Tío extends throughout the Altiplano, which extends to neighboring Peru and Chile.

=== Related divinities ===
El Tío's wife is Chinasupay ("she-devil") his wife, according to Victor Montoya, who compares Tío to the Greek Hades and his wife to the abducted Persephone.

== Carnival and dance ==
Every year, the Carnaval de Oruro is held, with the main spectacle of the entrade parade occurring on the Saturday before the final Ash Wednesday, in which costumed people enacting the chief devil Lucifer (El Tío), devils and she-devils (china-supay[s]) and Archangel Michael, and perform the diablada dance in the streets. Here, the Lucifer and Satan dancers are known to represents El Tío. This Lucifer-Tío-Supay is certainly the star of the diablada program. (Note: "Supay, el diablo más importante de la danza Diablada" It is unclear if the character formally called a Supay (rather than Lucifer) officially participates.) (Note: "LUCIFER.- Figura central de la diablada") The china-supay "she-devils" were performed by men in drag dancing in ribald manner before they were replaced by female dancers.

There has been a history of strife between the Catholic Church and the native mining population from the late 18th century onwards as to which content should represent in the carnival. (Note: The natives who were allowed to participate in the Catholic carnival (1781) reacted to the naming of the Virgin of Candelaria as patroness of the Oruro Carnival (1789), and fearing the jealousy of El Tío/Supay introduced the Supay into the festival. The Church not wishing the Supay's participation, had labeled it Lucifer, and made it perform in a "Seven Deadly Sins" morality play to reinforce the idea in (1818), and the diablada dance was discontinued soon after, not to be revived until 1904.)

== Parallel ==
The muqui (muki) of Central Peru is an analogous being of the mines, from whom miners seek protection through offerings and ritual.

== In media ==
In the documentary movie The Devil's Miner, Potosi villagers ritually slaughter a llama and smear its blood at the entrance to the mines, in the adits, and on each other.
