= Fiesta de La Tirana =

Annual festival in La Tirana, Chile

Fiesta de la Tirana is an annual festival held in the locality of La Tirana in the Tarapacá Region of northern Chile. The celebration takes place on July 16 in honor of the Virgen del Carmen. La Tirana is the biggest geographically localized religious festivity in Chile and attracts between 200,000 and 250,000 visitors during the week of celebrations, while the village's permanent population normally numbers 5,000 inhabitants.

== Background ==
Dancing is a big part of the celebrations of Fiesta de La Tirana, and dance groups and pilgrims dance before the Virgin. "The doors of the “temple,” or sanctuary, at La Tirana, are formally opened on July 10, and Bailes make their entrada from July 11-14. Each baile is assigned a specific time for entry, and the same order applies for departure at the end of the week. The baile dances first at a plaza at the entrance to the town, in front of the statue of the Cruz del Calvario, or Calvary Cross. Normally a priest is there to welcome and bless the group at the Cruz Calvario formally."

== See also ==
- Marian Days
- Feast of Our Lady of Mount Carmel
