= Muki (mythology) =

Mythological figure in the Andes

The muki (Quechua for asphyxia, also for a goblin who lives in caves, also spelled muqui or mooqui) is a goblin-like creature in the mythology of the Central Andes in Bolivia, Peru, Ecuador and Colombia. He is known to be a miner and his existence is constrained to underground spaces: The muki lives inside the mines.

Despite the distance and the isolation of the mining camps, the belief and the description of the muki is consistent throughout Peru, from the highlands of Puno in the south to Cajamarca in the north. Nonetheless, the names differ: chinchiliku (Moquegua and Arequipa), anchanchu or janchanchu (Puno), jusshi (Cajamarca) and muki (Pasco and Andean regions of Bolivia).

== Appearance ==
The muki is considered to be a dwarf due to its height, since it is no taller than 2 feet (0.61 meters). In the traditions of Cerro de Pasco, the muki is a small brawny creature with a disproportionate body. His head is attached to his body, but he lacks a neck. His voice is deep and husky, not matching his appearance, his long hair is bright blonde, his face is hairy and reddish, with a long white beard. His look is deep, aggressive and hypnotic and his eyes reflect the light as if they were made of metal. In some mining traditions, he has two horns that are used to break the rocks and point at the mineral veins. His skin is very pale and he carries a mining lantern. Sometimes he is described as having pointy ears.

As noted above, there is more than one type of muki in the legends. Just like there is diversity in the mining elves at a universal level, there are many varieties of muki in the underground world of the Andes. They are known for the places where they became visible. The oral traditions of each mine help to identify them by region. Thus a muki can be from the Cerro de Pasco, Ticlio, Huacracocha , Morococha, and Casapalca (in Huarochirí, Department of Lima), Goyllar , in Central Peru, also more particularly El Diamante, Excélsior, Santander (of Cerro de Pasco, or Cerro de Pasco Mining Company); Mina Tentadora and Mina Julcani (Huancavelica region).

Following the safety regulations of his work, the muki wears a helmet, a miner's outfit and studded boots. In other traditions, he is described as a small elf with a green outfit, sometimes with a very fine vicuña cape or with the waterproof outfit proper of a miner. He usually carries a lantern or a flashlight, depending on the technological level of the mine. He also walks like a duck because his feet are of abnormal size, and sometimes his legs can take the shape of a goose or crow’s.

But the description of the muki changes with time. Around the 1930s, he was said to wander the mines while holding a gas lantern and wearing a vicuña poncho. He was described as having two small shiny horns and to speak with a soft voice. Nowadays he has a more updated look: mining outfit, rain boots and a battery flashlight. Sometimes he shape-shifts into an animal or a blond white man to appear to the miners and deceive them.

== Behavior ==
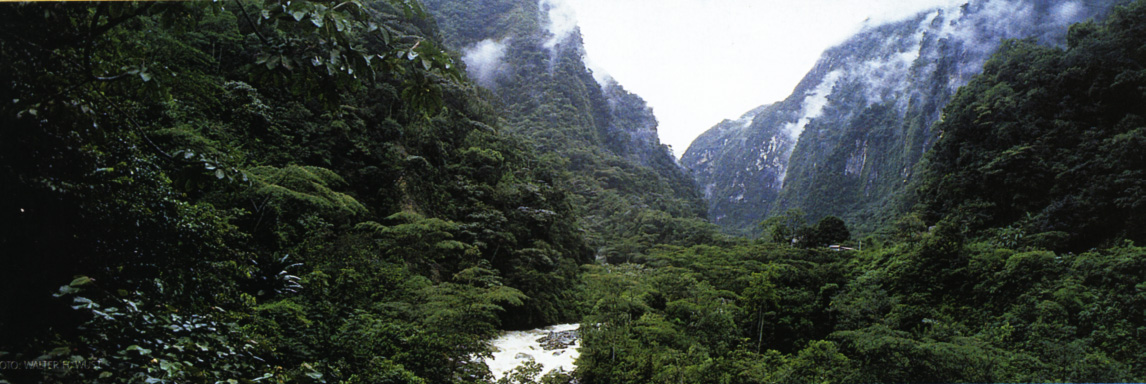
The muki inhabits the mines of the Andes.

The muki lives in lonely places, and its attacks inspire fear in victims and adversaries. They are known for stealing defenseless children. Elders advise that, when dealing with the muki, one should use his/her belt to battle him without succumbing to fear.

The fusion (syncretism) of the Andean and Christian cultures brought European beliefs into this myth, such that the main victims of these goblins were the morito (unbaptized) children. Or, as it is said in the southern regions of Peru, that these unbaptized children are the ones that become mukis themselves. In some tales, the unbaptized children are kidnapped by the goblins, who live in fig or banana trees, and kept until they turn into goblins too. The skin of the children who spend time with these creatures turns very pale and it is advised to take the victims to church at once so they can receive the sacrament.

The belief in the muki comes from old Andean traditions about demons and small creatures who inhabit the Ukhu Pacha (“world of below”) and the miners need to explain many of the extraordinary daily occurrences of their lives.

The muki can be by himself or in groups, but they are known to prefer living on their own. They live in a timeless world of eternal darkness and they don't age, as if they were not affected by the pass of time. The muki likes to whistle loudly, and thus warn of danger to the miners of their liking.

The muki can make the metal veins appear and disappear, sense the moods and emotions of the miners, help with the miner's work by softening or hardening the metal veins, etc. He is known to help miners and sometimes to make pacts with them. He gravitates towards discreet and honest people, who will fulfill their promises and not share the details of their interaction with him.

Many stories coincide on the fact that it is possible to capture the Mooqui and make a pact with him. Very often he offers to do the miners’ work for some coca, alcohol or the company of a woman, as that helps him feel less lonely. Yet, the outcome tends to be tragic due to the miner rarely being able to do as promised. When this occurs, the muki takes the miner's life.

== See also ==
- Anchanchu
