= Layqa =

Layqa (Aymara and Quechua) is a term employed prior to the Spanish Conquest to denote a ceremonial healer from the Quechua speaking central Peruvian highlands. After the arrival of the European Inquisitors, Catholic priests, began referring to all Quechua magico-religious practitioners by this title, equating the layqa with ‘sorcerer’ or ‘witch.’ Early references to the layqa appear in the Spanish Chronicles, as well as the Huarochirí Manuscript, commissioned in 1608 by a clerical prosecutor and Inquisitor, Father Francisco de Avila, who used it for the persecution of indigenous worships and beliefs.

Several contemporary investigators, including psychiatrist and anthropologist Ina Rösing, and medical anthropologist Alberto Villoldo have attempted to clarify that the layqa in the prehispanic world were not 'witches', but traditional healers and wisdom teachers.

In modern Quechuan culture, to call someone a layqa is considered a serious insult. A layqa is typically associated with harmful magic, spiritual attack, envy-based ritual aggression, curses, manipulation of spirits for selfish purposes, or imbalance and disorder. The issue is not merely the use of spiritual power, but the intention and social consequences behind its use.

The term is not always used literally; in some contexts it may function socially merely as an accusation or insult.

== See also ==
- Yatiri
