= Llama llama =

Andean dance

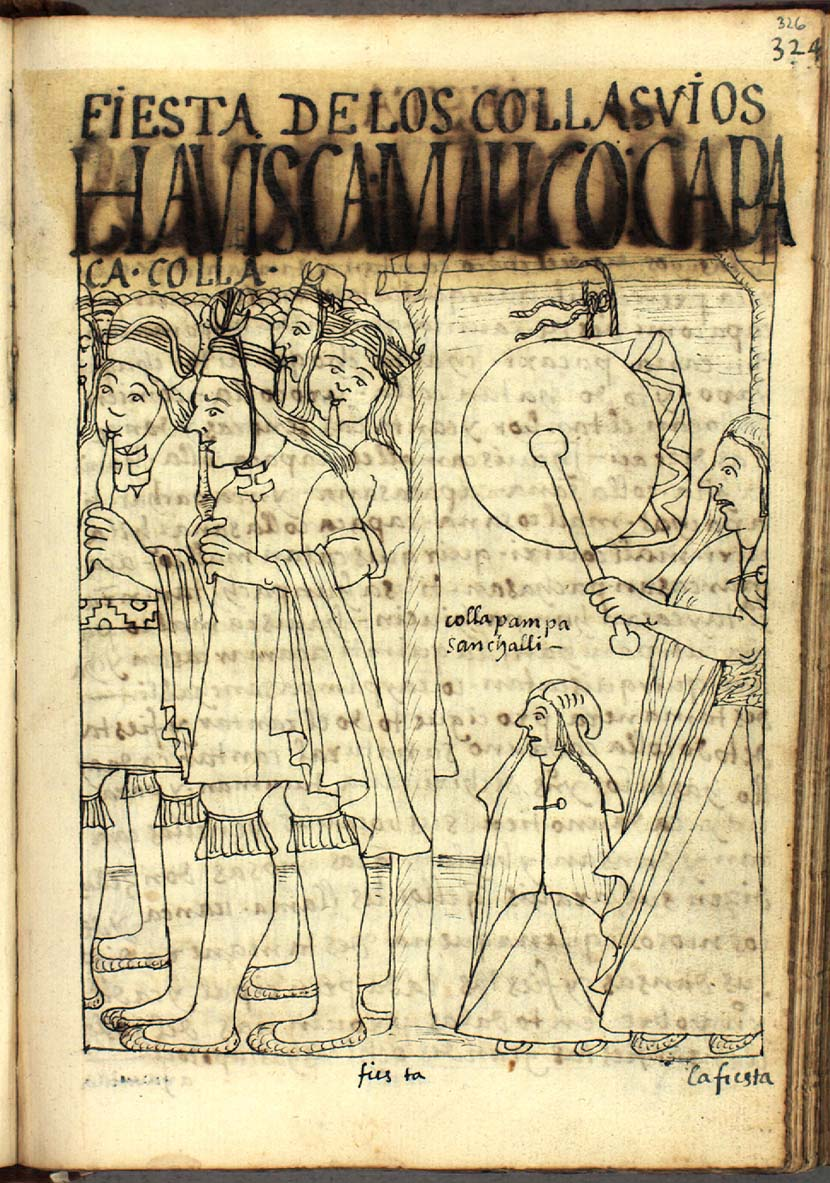
Depiction of a Qullasuyu party in the 17th century book Primer Nueva Corónica y Buen Gobierno of Felipe Guamán Poma de Ayala.

The Llama llama, also spelled Llamallama or Lama lama, was probably a dance with the characteristics of a farce or a disguise game with acrobatic elements. It is believed that the name of the dance came from the Aymara language, which was the name the Aymara people used to describe the Urus dressed as dancing demons.

There are references to this dance in the works of Diego González Holguín and Ludovico Bertonio, Gonzáles Holguín compared this dance with the saynata and the siracusa, with the meaning of a “laughter thing”. Later Bertonio establishes a difference with the other dances, saying that the llama llama or haachuco was the mask or little, Tiny, Short, Stubby, Boring devil.

This dance was performed during the Ito festivities by the representatives of the region known as Uruqulla (Urucolla), a sub-region of the south-eastern Qullasuyu located in the lake system of the Department of Oruro between the basins of the lakes Poopó and Coipasa, where the Uru civilization had the city of Oruro as their main social centre, becoming together with Nazca and Wari one of the most ancient cities in the Andean world.
