= La Tirana =

- City and Commune
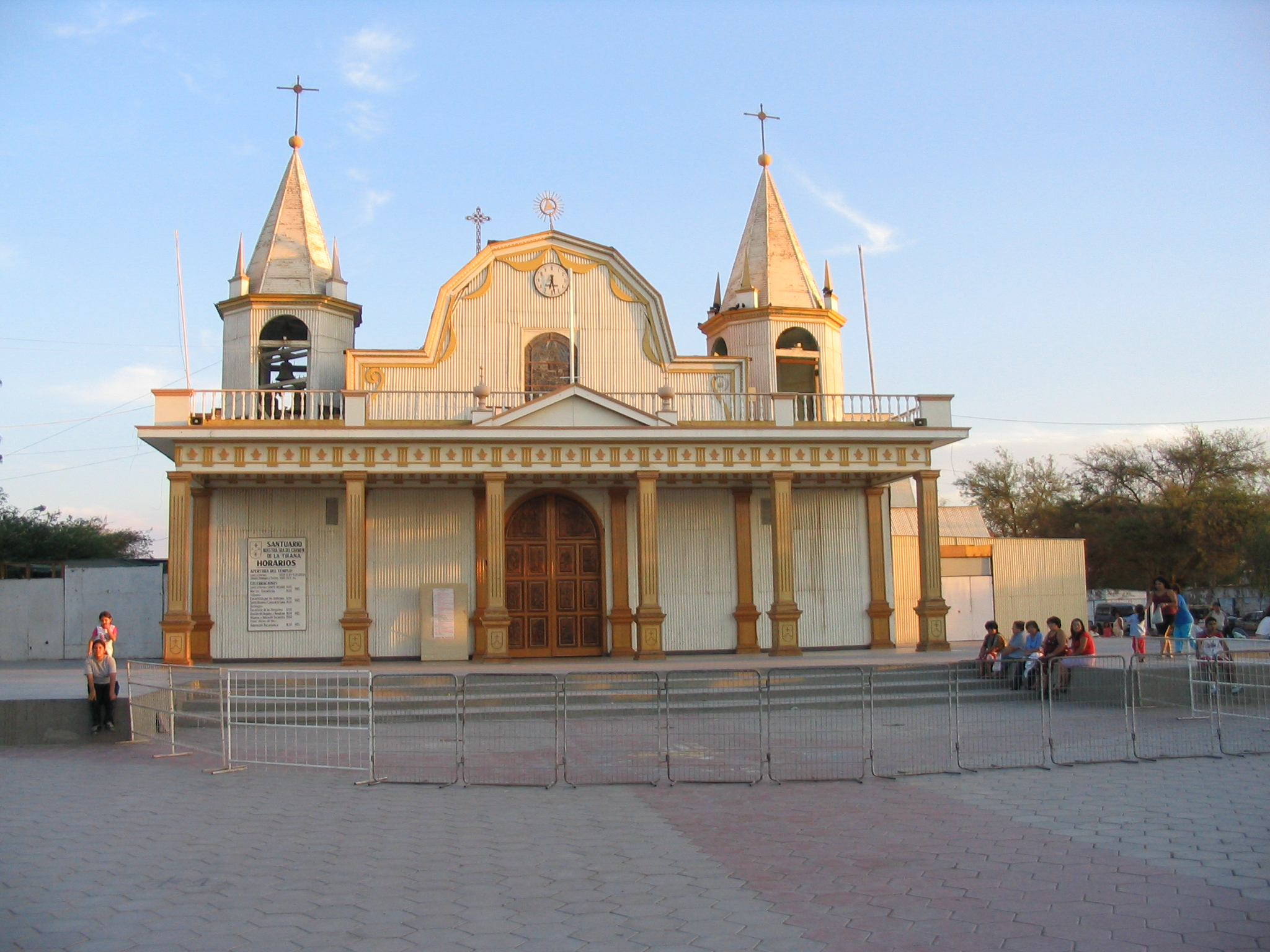
- Church of La Tirana

- Location in Chile
- Coordinates (city): 20°21′S 69°40′W
- Country: Chile
- Region: Tarapacá
- Province: Tamarugal
- Commune: Pozo Almonte

Government
  - Type: Municipal council

Population (2017 Census)
  - Total: 837

Sex
- Time zone: UTC−4 (CLT)
  - Summer (DST): UTC−3 (CLST)
- Climate: BWk

La Tirana is a Chilean town in the commune of Pozo Almonte in El Tamarugal Province, Tarapacá Region. The town lies in an oasis in the middle of the Pampa del Tamarugal, about 72 km inland from the port of Iquique.

The town is notable for its religious feast in honor of Our Lady of Mount Carmel. It is celebrated on July 16 of each year, being the most important religious feast of the Norte Grande.

The area around La Tirana was deforested in the 19th century largely as a result of high demand for firewood driven by the paradas method used to process saltpeter.
