= Yatiri =

Aymara medical practitioners and healers

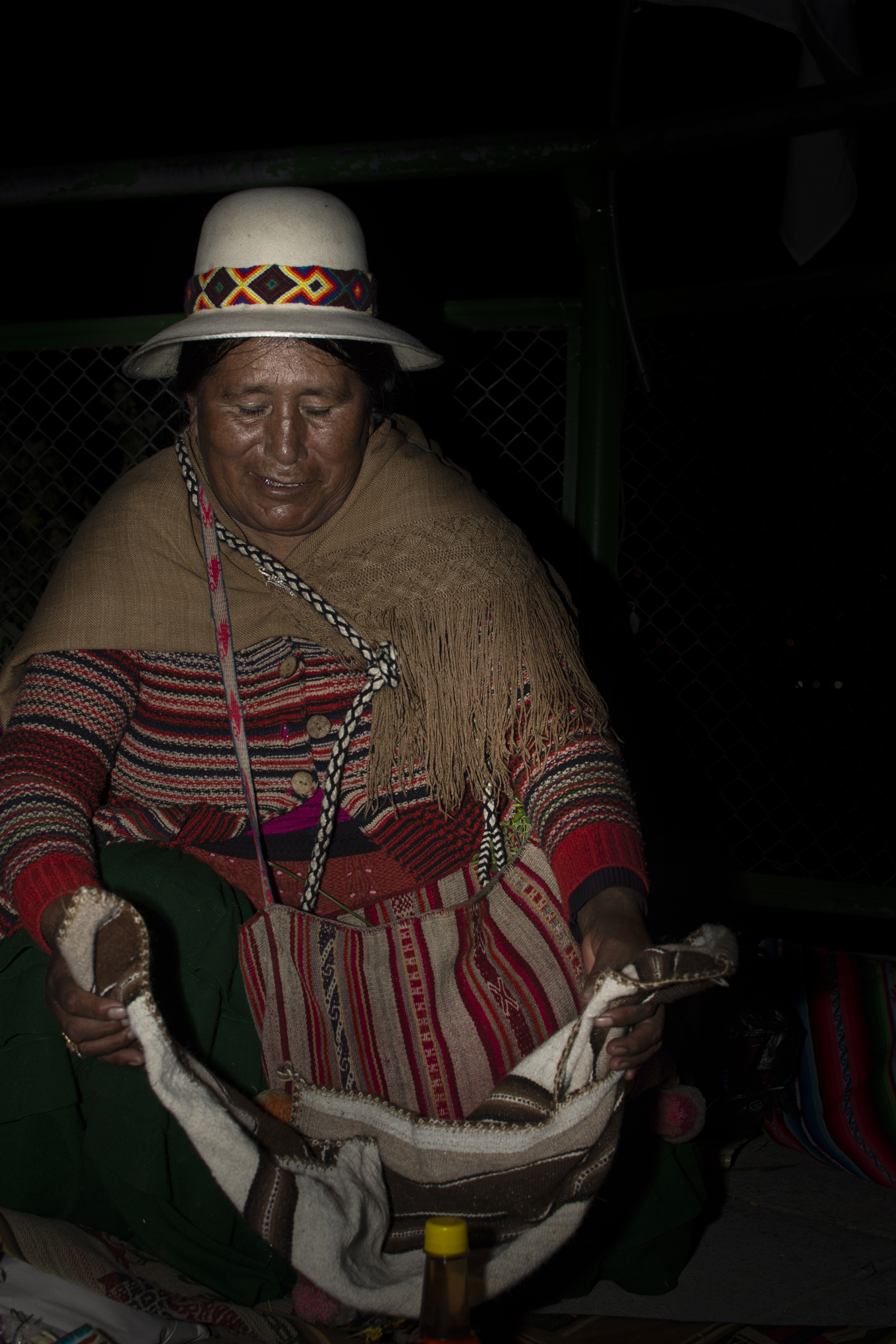
A yatiri

Yatiri are medical practitioners and community healers among the Aymara of Bolivia, Chile and Peru, who use in their practice both symbols and materials such as coca leaves. Yatiri are a special subclass of the more generic category Qulliri, a term used for any traditional healer in Aymara society.

== Current status of the Yatiri ==
=== Politics ===
As a result of current events in Bolivia, Yatiri and anything related to their practices have become quite popular, as a reaction against perceived threats from globalization and Western culture, especially anything related to the United States of America.

== Problems faced by Yatiri ==
=== Historical ===
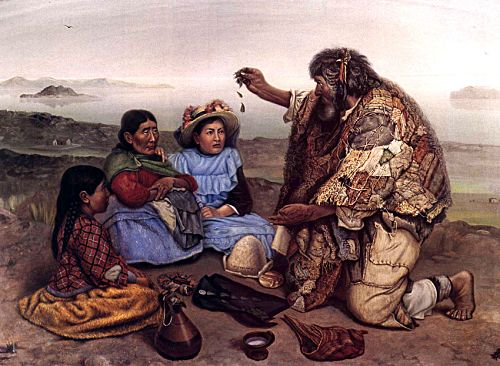
El Yatiri, oil painting painting by Arturo Borda, (1918) private collection, La Paz

As a result of Spanish colonization and the influence of Western culture, the Yatiri face pressure from the Western notion of individualism, as opposed to the traditional Aymara concept of community. The Christian church has also often ostracised the Yatiri, perceiving their role to be superfluous in modern religious practice, and a form of paganism. This has changed as current government officials openly support Yatiri presence in events that formerly might have had a Catholic chaplain under the terms and practice of the Concordat with the Holy See. Nevertheless, normal practice for most Andean people mixes practices from both traditions, for example in the cha'lla, a blessing bestowed on any form of property, often done with both sacrifices to the Pachamama and Catholic prayers.

=== Modern medicine ===
Whereas the Aymara perceive 'health' to be a relationship with nature, with members of the community, and with ancestors; and the Yatiri play a vital role in strengthening and repairing these relationships.

== Terminology ==
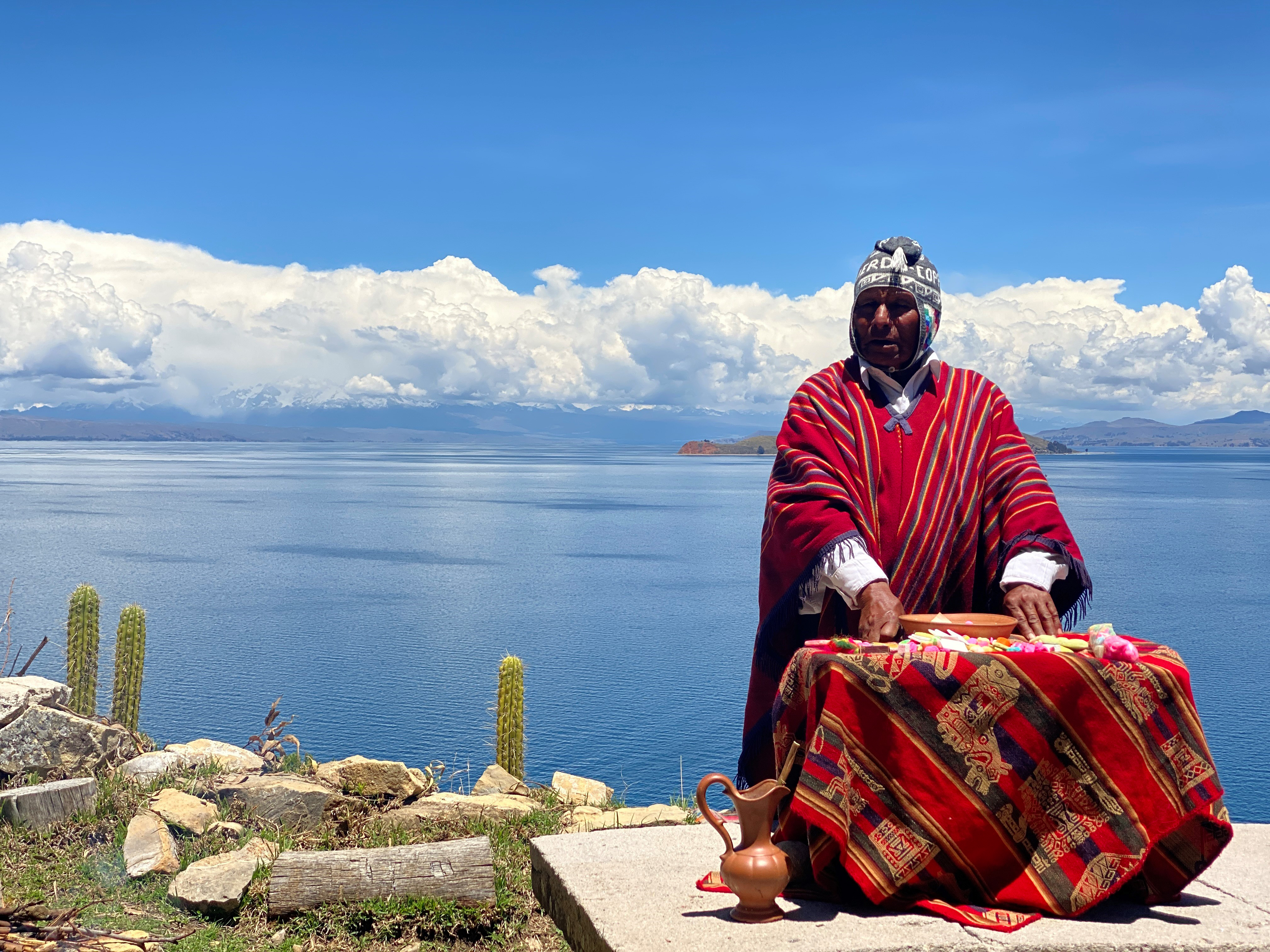
A yatiri performing a ritual at Lake Titicaca, Bolivia

Several Aymara words and phrases are indispensable for an understanding of the role of Yatiri within the Aymara community. As these concepts are unique to the Aymara setting, there is no adequate English translation. Qulliri are healers associated with medicinal herbs, and require no special initiation to take up their vocation. Layqa, traditionally marginalized and shunned, live on the outskirts of Aymara communities and use frogs and snakes in rituals to do harm to others. One becomes a layqa by agreeing (usually for a price) to do these rituals to harm a person, on behalf of a client. Rayu refers to lightning and its physical manifestations. Those who have been struck by lightning are often called rayun purita ("struck by lightning") or purita ("arrived"). It is these purita who have been called to become yatiri. In their healing ceremonies, yatiri interact with (among other things) achachilas and ruwitus. Achachilas are ancestors different from biological ancestors, and ruwitus are human skulls that are considered to be dead elders in either a generational or a cultural sense. Ch'amakani ("someone who has or owns the darkness") is an elder yatiri who undertakes the training of an apprentice yatiri-to-be.

== The Yatiri in the community ==
=== Are Yatiri shamans? ===
Outsiders have often referred to the Yatiri as "shamans"; however, the role of the Yatiri differs markedly from that of the Central Asian shamans. Shamans typically live and practice in isolation, undergo private and individual initiations to their roles, and practice ecstatic techniques in conjunction with their work. They also typically learn to heal by learning to heal themselves after a near-death experience. In contrast, the Yatiri are full members of Aymara communities who participate in the regular lifestyle of the Aymara, and learn their trade from masters. Like shamans, Yatiri can be both female and male.

=== Linguistic approach to define the Yatiri ===
The word yatiri comes from the verb yatiña "to know". Thus a yatiri is literally "someone who knows". The thing that distinguishes yatiri from others in the community is that they have been struck by lightning, and have become yatiri. The lightning strike is a sign of having been called, but it does not automatically make one a yatiri. In modern times, because qulliri is a neutral term, not associated by Westerners with sorcery, many yatiri have been called qulliri when outsiders inquire as to their status. Strictly speaking, yatiri are qulliri, but they are a special class of qulliri who have also experienced the lightning strike and undergone initiation to become yatiri. Yatiri are never called "yatiri" to their face, but rather are referred to as ak'ulliri "someone who chews coca", aytiri "someone who picks up the coca" or uñiri "someone who reads coca."

== On becoming Yatiri ==
There are many factors at play in a person's calling to become a yatiri. Who a person will become is affected by the season in which she is born, by her patron saint, and by her ichutata ichumama (a specific kind of godparent). The confirmation of this calling, however, is marked by the lightning strike, which typically happens to an unmarried Aymara out herding the flocks. The lightning strike marks her as purita, "one who is struck." However, occasionally lightning will strike somebody who is not called, making her a pantata "one who has been struck mistakenly." At the lightning strike, the purita is said to have died and passed from death to rebirth; in fact if anyone else witnesses this strike it is believed that the purita will die. If a person has the signs of a yatiri, and has been struck by lightning, she is a purita and cannot refuse the call to become a yatiri. Likewise, a person who does not have the signs and has not been struck, may not seek to become a yatiri. Once a yatiri-to-be has aged a few years, she undertakes a journey to find her ch'amakani, the senior yatiri who will train her. Hilario, the yatiri interviewed by Tomas Huanca in his 1987 thesis traveled three times to his ch'amakani's homeland, each time as a traveling musician, and once there received tutoring from Hilario, his ch'amakani. When the candidate is ready to become a yatiri, she will ask permission of the achachila (spiritual ancestor) through her ch'amakani.

== The Yatiri's role in healing ==
A yatiri is a full participant in the Aymara community; her special role does not relieve her from the social and agricultural duties shared by all community members. She never makes the first move in healing, but always waits for someone who has a complaint or a problem to consult her. Just as she is obliged to wait for requests, the yatiri is likewise obliged to treat all who do come to her. She typically exercises her role at home in the presence of either the patient or someone who is acting on the patient's behalf. Occasionally, the yatiri's ritual helpers will indicate that she must treat the patient in person, or travel to a ritual place in order to give an offering. She will also practice outside her home if the patient requests such. The principal helper in the yatiri's curing ceremony is the riwutu or human skull. Riwutu are ancestors who have been killed, usually by "robbers," and are seen as an intermediary between the world of humans and that of the dead. The riwutu is placed together with saxra bullets (small pieces of metal or stone that have been fused together by lightning), as well as with tari llama wool, coca, and sculptures of the saints. If the yatiri has been asked to discover a lost object or one taken by thieves, she may use candles in her ceremony. If she is to heal somebody ill, she may use a piece of cloth- isi - that has touched the patient.

== Sources ==
- Huanca L., Tomas (1987). The Yatiri in Aymara Communities (With Complete Text) (Thesis). University of Florida.
