= Nitratine =

Mineral form of sodium nitrate

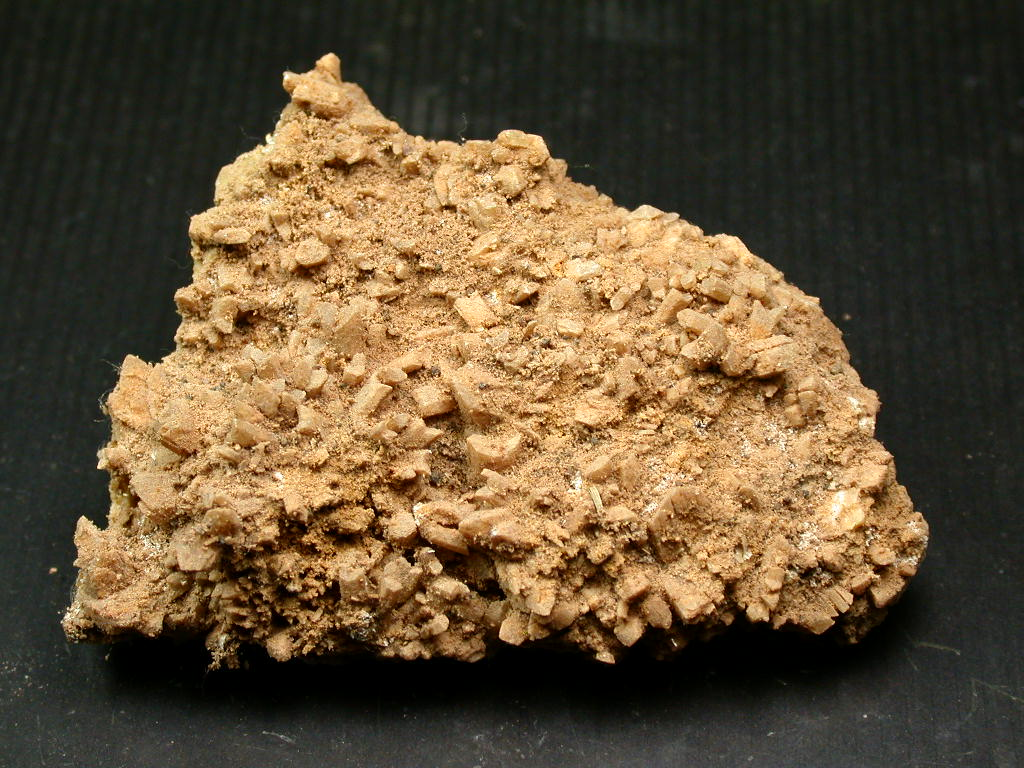

General
- Category: Nitrate minerals
- Formula: NaNO_{3}
- IMA symbol: Ntt
- Strunz classification: 5.NA.05 (10th edition); 5/A.01-10 (8th edition)
- Crystal system: Trigonal
- Crystal class: Hexagonal scalenohedral (3̅m); H-M symbol: (3̅ 2/m)
- Space group: R3̅c (no. 167)
- Unit cell: a = 5.06 Å, c = 16.82 Å; Z = 6

Identification
- Formula mass: 84.99 g/mol
- Color: Colorless, white, gray, yellowish, brownish
- Crystal habit: Granular – Generally occurs as anhedral to subhedral crystals in matrix; massive – Uniformly indistinguishable crystals forming large masses
- Cleavage: {1011} Perfect
- Tenacity: Sectile – curved shavings or scrapings produced by a knife blade
- Mohs scale hardness: 1.5 – 2
- Luster: Vitreous (glassy)
- Streak: White
- Diaphaneity: Transparent
- Specific gravity: 2.26
- Optical properties: Uniaxial (−)
- Refractive index: n_{ω} = 1.580 – 1.587 n_{ε} = 1.330 – 1.336
- Birefringence: δ = 0.250–0.251
- Solubility: Readily soluble in water
- Other characteristics: Slightly deliquescent

Nitratine or nitratite, also known as cubic niter (UK: nitre), soda niter or Chile saltpeter (UK: Chile saltpetre), is a mineral, the naturally occurring form of sodium nitrate, NaNO_{3}. Chemically it is the sodium analogue of saltpeter. Nitratine crystallizes in the trigonal system, but rarely occurs as well-formed crystals. It is isostructural with calcite. It is relatively soft and light with a Mohs hardness of 1.5 to 2 and a specific gravity of 2.24 to 2.29. Its refractive indices are nω = 1.587 and nε = 1.336.

The typical form is as coatings of white, grey to yellowish brown masses. The rare crystals when found typically have the scalenohedral form of the calcite structure. It is found only as an efflorescence in very dry environments. It is very soluble in water such that it is deliquescent and will absorb water out of the air and turn into a puddle of sodium nitrate solution when exposed to humid air.

There are nitratine deposits located in arid regions across the world such as in Chile, Mexico, Egypt, Peru, and South Africa. Chile is the only country to sell their deposits commercially as fertilizer. The salt bed that is mined contains more minerals than just nitratine often containing sulfurous minerals as well as Iodine. Around 600,000 tons of nitratine are mined in Chile each year with other products such as Iodine and sodium sulfate mined as well.

Nitratine happens to be isostructural to calcite, CaCO_{3}, a widespread naturally occurring mineral, although nitratine dissolution and crystallization occur much faster than the same processes for calcite. The structural similarity makes nitratine a very useful mineral for laboratory experiments concerning pressure dissolution and other experiments such as serving as a proxy for the deformation and formation of calcite.

The Saltpeter War (1480–1510) and the War of the Pacific (1879–1884) were fought over the control of saltpeter deposits.

== Uses ==
Nitratine was once an important source of nitrates for fertilizer and other chemical uses including fireworks. It has been known since 1845 from mineral deposits in the Confidence Hills, Southern Death Valley, California and the Atacama Desert, Chile. It is still used in organic farming (where Haber–Bosch ammonia is forbidden) in the US, but prohibited in international organic agriculture.

The mineral also has a wide range of applications beyond being used as a fertilizer in agricultural practices. Nitratine has been used in the explosives industry for water-containing slurry as well as gel explosives. It is also used as a refining agent to remove air bubbles by the glass and enamel industries. Nitratine, other alkali nitrates, or nitrites also have applications for solar technology serving as a heat-transfer or heat-storage medium. Nitratine can also be used as a substitute for potassium nitrate in gunpowder.

== Synthetic sodium nitrate ==
After World War I the need for a more efficient production of fertilizer led to the production of synthetic nitratine which was much less costly in terms of production than the Shanks process used to refine chilean saltpeter. The method of production involved using tail gases from nitric acid plants in combination with sodium carbonate solution or sodium hydroxide solution. Through a series of reactions it is possible to produce sodium nitrate and sodium nitrate with byproducts such as nitrogen monoxide and water. The following reactions show the chemistry necessary to produce sodium nitrates:

$\ce{2NaOH + 2NO2 + NO -> 2NaNO2 + H2O}$

$\ce{Na2CO3 + NO2 + NO -> 2NaNO2 +CO2}$

$\ce{2NaOH + 2NO2 -> NaNO3 + NaNO2 + H2O}$

$\ce{Na2CO3 + 2NO2 -> NaNO3 + NaNO2 +CO2}$

$\ce{3NaNO2 + 2HNO3 -> 3NaNO3 + 2 NO + H2O}$

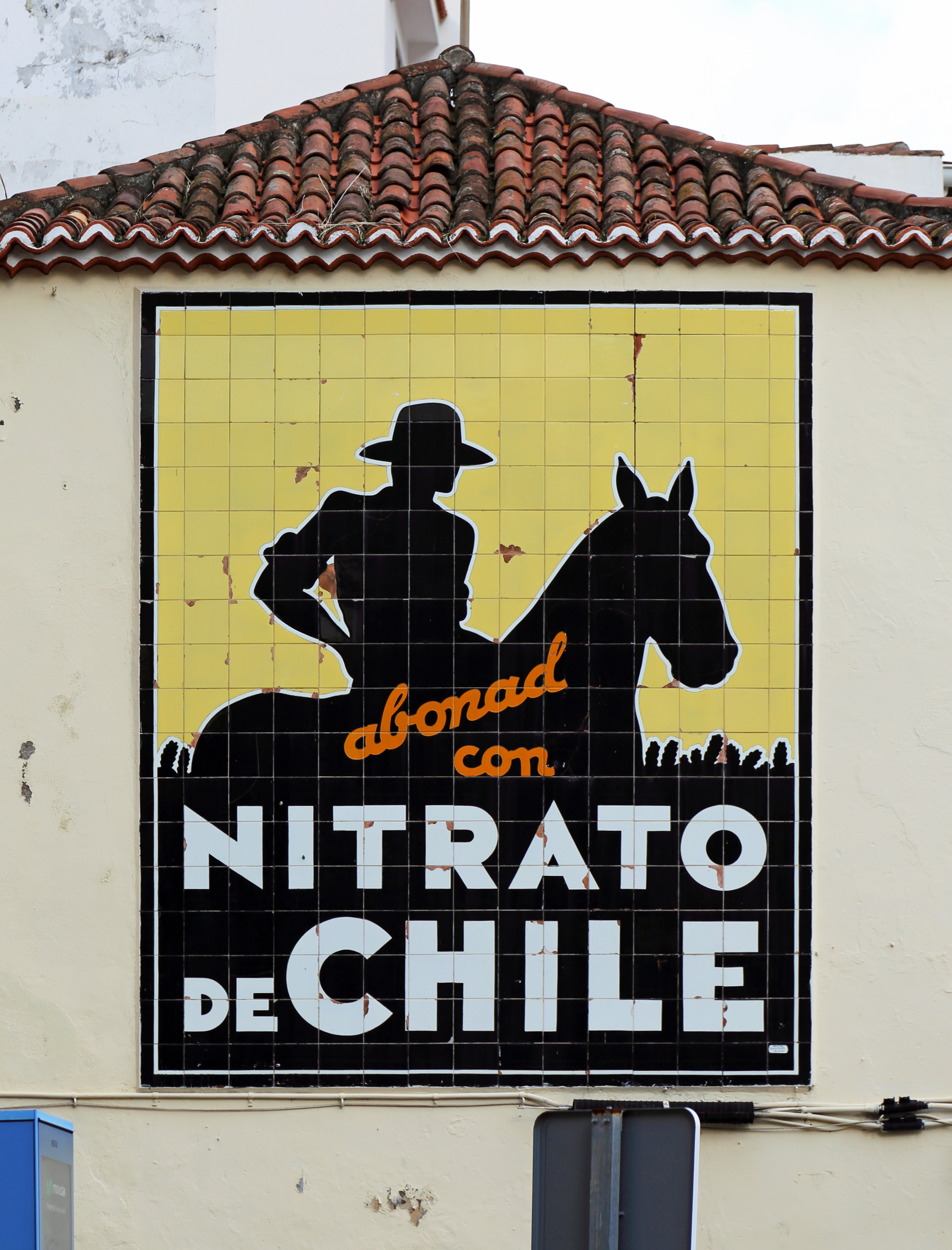
Advertisement for Chilean saltpeter for use as fertilizer in Spain

== See also ==
- Fertilizer
- List of Saltpeter works in Tarapacá and Antofagasta
- Mining in Chile
- Niter
- Nitrate
- Nitric acid
- Nitrogen cycle
- Paradas method
- Potassium nitrate
- Sodium hydroxide
