= Pacha (Inca mythology) =

Andean cosmological concept

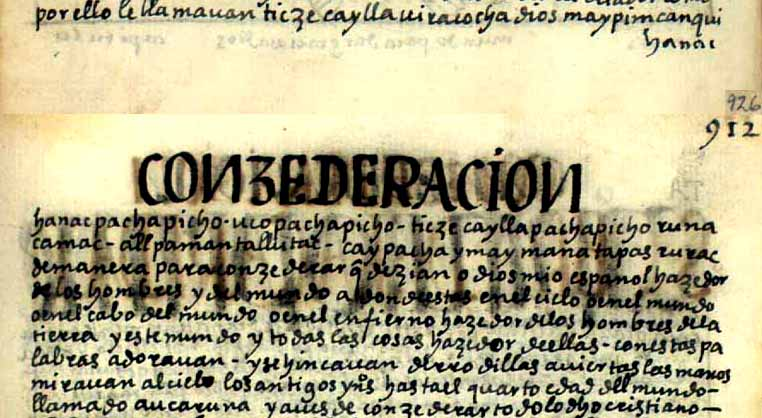
Indigenous chronicler Felipe Guaman Poma de Ayala in his Nueva coronica i buen gobierno (1615, f. 912) uses terms ⟨hanacpacha⟩ hanaq pacha and ⟨ucopacha⟩ ukhu pacha while arguing that pre-Hispanic Andeans knew of the Christian God under the name Viracocha.

The pacha (Quechua pronunciation: [pætʃæ]) is an Andean cosmological concept associating the physical world and space with time, and corresponding with the concept of space-time.

The literal meaning of the word in Quechua is "place". Pacha can have various meanings in different contexts, and has been associated with the different stages and levels in the progressive development of the cosmos towards discontinuity and differentiation of forms, and attributed as encoding an Inca concept for dividing the different spheres of the cosmos akin to 'realm' or 'reality'. This latter interpretation, disputed by some scholars since such realm names may have been the product of missionaries' lexical innovation (and, thus, of Christian influence), is considered to refer to "real, concrete places, and not ethereal otherworlds".

== Definition ==
In contemporary Quechuan languages, pacha means "place, land, soil, region, era, totality, space, time, universe.". The use of the word for both spatial and temporal reference has been reconstructed, with the same meaning, to proto-Quechuan *pacha. There is no etymological link between pacha and the proto-Quechua terms *paʈʂak ("one hundred"), or *paʈʂa ("belly"), nor the southern Quechua term p'acha ("clothes"). Whether the word is used with reference to its spatial or temporal meaning is depending on context, as in pacha chaka ("earth bridge") or in ñawpa pacha, which means "the ancient times" (literally "the times of the ancestors").

In Classical Quechua, the word seems to have meant "world" or "universe" when not associated with other words. It was often present in important proper names in Andean pre-Hispanic cultures such as the theonym ⟨Pachacamac⟩ pacha kama-q ("universe's supporter, world's creator", or "the one who animates the soil") or ⟨Pachacuti⟩ pacha kuti-y ("world's turning").

In Pre-columbian times, the term pacha designated a specific cultural concept, which is difficult to translate into European languages. Anthropologist Catherine J. Allen translates pacha as "world-moment", and scholar Eusebio Manga Qespi has stated that pacha can be translated as "spacetime".

== Andean cosmological concept ==
In the pre-Columbian Andean world, the conception of time was associated with space, both collectively called pacha (earth, soil), which was in continual development toward order and toward "functional differentiation and discontinuity of forms, factors of complementarity rather than rivalry, therefore of peace and productivity". However, rather than representing a state of constant change or progress it represented a "punctuated equilibrium" and order, interrupted by moments of radical change.

In accordance with the Andean concepts of duality, complementarity and opposition, space-time was conceived in connection to certain events, social relationships, vitality (camaquen), social being, certain huacas (constellations, ancestors, and deities personified in the landscape). There existed various geographic spatio-temporel divisions, with strong political and ideological connotations, in Cuzco and in the Inca Empire, showing the social status and position of groups and places, and influencing the administrative organization of the Andean chiefdoms.

=== Progressive and cyclic development towards order ===
The Incas (and, more broadly, Andean cultures) understood time as cyclical, integrated into the concept of “Pacha” (which encompasses space, time, and the cosmic order). They did not view history as a straight line with a clear beginning, constant progress, and a definitive end, as in many modern Western historical narratives (influenced by Judeo-Christianity and the idea of linear progress).

The spatio-temporal development of the cosmos was divided into several fundamental stages in the development of the world: the pre-solar era, during which men lived in semi-darkness, which was closed by the event of the arrival of the sun, establishing the alternation between night and day; the solar era, divided into two periods by the advent of the great flood called Unu Pachacuti ("reversal of space-time, or return of time, by water"), a first period where the huacas ruled the Andean states, and a second during which the relations of opposition and complementarity were maintained between the llaqtas, urban spaces, and urqu, uninhabited lands of the mountains, the ancient huaca lords now personifying the natural spaces surrounding and defining the identity of the Andean socio-territorial and political entities; and then the Purum Pacha and the Inka Pacha, the first era being the pre-Incaic age supposedly uncultured and barbaric, and the second being the Incaic era, in which, following the conquests of the Inca Emperor Pachacuti ("world's turning" or "cataclysm") which mark a "sort of "return to square one", after exhaustion of the forces [camaquen] of the era which was ending" and which then became the old era associated with chaos, the Inca empire is charged of the civilizing and ordering mission of the post-diluvian world, notably in order to delay the end and the cyclical restarting of the world.

The chroniclers of the colonial period mentioned various pachas, of different number. According to Inca Garcilaso de la Vega, there were only two, while Pedro Sarmiento de Gamboa wrote of three eras, and Felipe Guaman Pima de Ayala of five.

=== Worlds ===
According to various anthropologists, historians and linguists there existed two spatio-temporal "realms" or "worlds", called Pacha, in addition to "This Pacha". This postulat is based on Quechua compounds used in colonial sources for Christian concepts pointing to pre-Hispanic use for cosmological concepts. That is the case for hananc pacha or hanan pacha and of ucu pacha or ukhu pacha, which were used for "Christian heaven" and "Christian hell", respectively, since at least the first written Quechua text and first Quechua dictionaries.

Andean tradition conceives of the universe as an interconnected, living system, where the different planes of existence are not strictly separate but are interrelated through complementary dualities (yanantin) and cycles of creation and destruction (pachakuti).

These realms are not solely spatial, but simultaneously spatial and temporal. Although the universe would have been considered a unified system within Inca cosmology, the division between the worlds is a part of the dualism prominent in Inca beliefs, known as yanantin. This concept of duality considered everything which existed as having two opposed complementary characteristics ( feminine and masculine, hot and cold, positive and negative, dark and light, order and chaos, etc.).

=== Hawa Pacha ===
In the Andean worldview, the Hawa Pacha (outer world or "world outside") is an invisible realm that transcends conventional space-time, acting as an infinite ocean where worlds, dimensions, and realities vibrate, transcending the visible universe and other known planes. This world represents realities that go beyond our direct perception; a more subtle sphere of the cosmos, related to the invisible universe, times, and dimensions that escape human senses.

=== Hanan Pacha ===
Hanan Pacha (the upper world) is the celestial realm; it refers to the worlds above. According to the writings of Diego González Holguín and Domingo de Santo Tomás, this world is interpreted as a two-part entity: Janan Pacha (the physical heaven) and Janaj Pacha (the metaphysical heaven).

=== Hakaq Pacha ===
The Hakaq Pacha or Haqay Pacha (world beyond) is the realm associated with the “afterlife” or the transcendent world of spirits. Some descriptions place it within or beyond the Hanan Pacha, while others present it as a separate realm: the realm of spirits, exalted ancestors, or that which exists beyond what is perceptible to the human senses.

=== Kay Pacha ===
Kay pacha (Quechua: "this pacha") would have been the perceptible world which people, animals, and plants all inhabit. Kay pacha may have often been impacted by the struggle between hanan pacha and hurin pacha. This realm would have originally not had the subordination and inferior status in relation to the upper realm that it has in Christian conception.

=== Hurin Pacha ===
Hurin Pacha (the underworld) is the Andean underworld. As the realm associated with death, it is inhabited by Supay and other underworld beings who torment the living. It is also associated with fertility, the moon, and nocturnal animals, and this plane is traversed by an underworld sea.

=== Ukhu Pacha ===
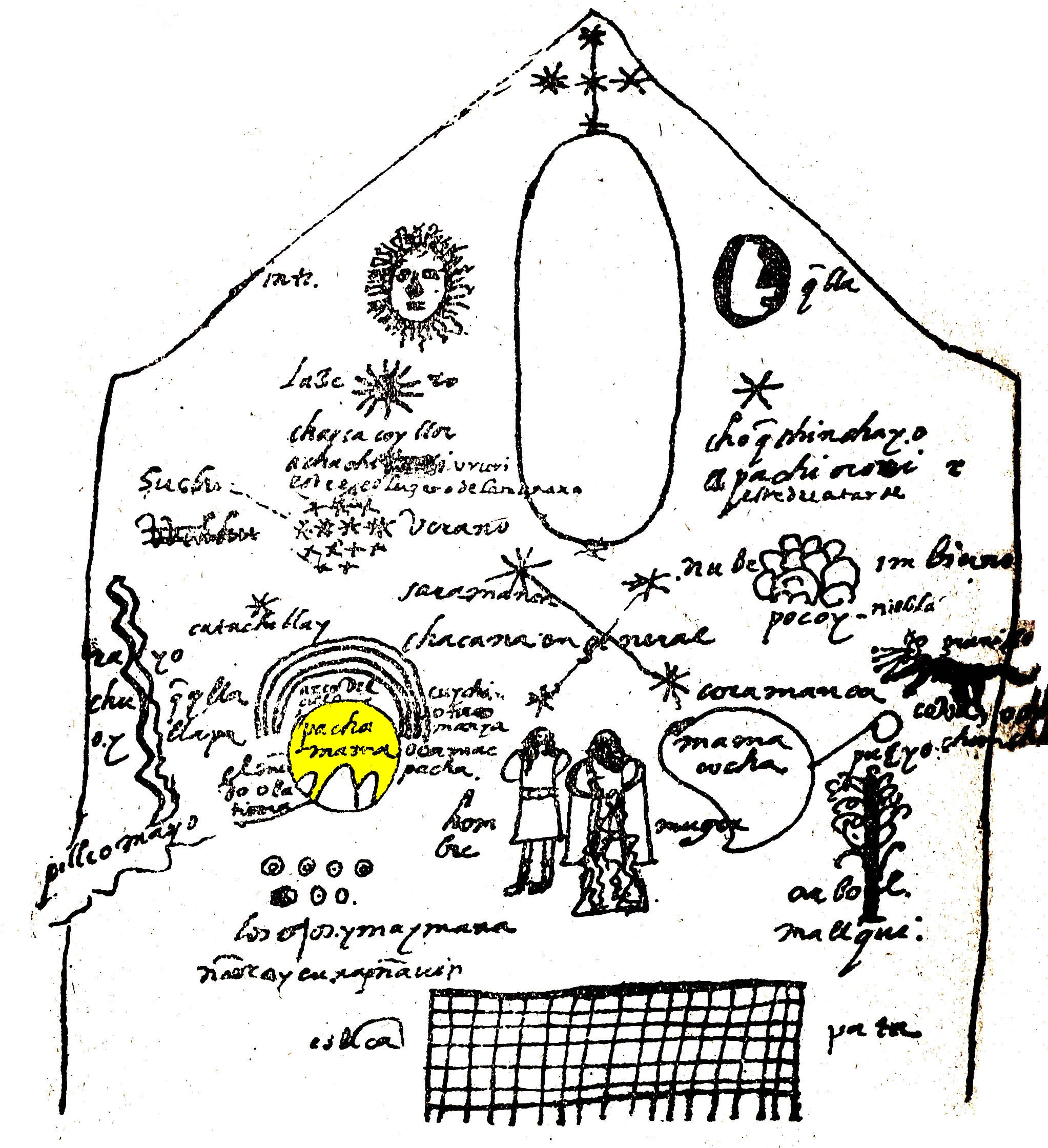
Cosmological drawing by Aymara chronicler Juan de Santa Cruz Pachacuti Yamqui Salcamaygua (1613), which has been interpreted as a representation of Pachamama.

Uku Pacha (the inner world) is considered the realm of eternal darkness, where the ultimate embodiment of night resides—the antagonistic force to the celestial power, the generative power. It is not the same as Hurin Pacha, although in some cases it is often considered the deepest part of the underworld. Both Hurin Pacha and Uku Pacha are terms that are confused in the chronicles, and there may have been other names that have been forgotten over time and due to evangelization.

When the Spanish conquered the area, rituals about ukhu pacha became crucial in missionary activity and mining operations. Kendall W. Brown contends that the dualistic nature and rituals surrounding openings to ukhu pacha may have made it easier to initially get indigenous laborers to work in the mines. However, at the same time, because mining was considered a perturbation of "subterranean life and the spirits that ruled it; they yielded to sacredness that did not belong to the familiar universe, a deeper and riskier sacredness." In order to insure that the perturbation did not cause evil in the miners or the world, indigenous populations made traditional offering to the supay. However, Catholic missionaries preached that the supay were purely evil and equated them with the devil and hell and thus prohibited offerings. Ritual surrounding ukhu pacha thus retained importance even after Spanish conquest.

=== Connections between pachas ===
Although the different realms would have been distinct, there would have been a variety of connections between them. Caves and springs would have served as connections between ukhu pacha and kay pacha, while rainbows and lightning would have served as connections between hanan pacha and kay pacha. In addition, human spirits after death could inhabit any of the levels. Some would remain in kay pacha until they had finished business, while others might move to the other two levels.

==== Cyclic development ====
According to other reconstructions, the most significant connection between the different levels was at cataclysmic events called pachakutiy ("world's turning"). These would have been the instances when the different levels would all impact one another transforming the entire order of the world, and cause and contribute therefore to the cyclic and progressif development of the cosmos. These could come as a result of earthquakes, floods, or of other cataclysmic events.

== Criticism ==
Various historians, anthropologists and linguists are critical of the existence of the concept of Pacha in pre-Columbian Andean thought, which is largely based on the indigenous chronicler Guaman Poma's 1616 chronicle. This chronicler, writing in a particular political context, thought, similarly to Inca Garcilaso de la Vega, that the Inca emperors prepared the Andes to receive Catholicism, comparing events from Andean cosmological development to Western history, notably using the word "flood" to describe Unu Pachacuti, and therefore comparing the destruction of the world by the creator deity Viracocha to the Bliblical flood.

The archeologist Pierre Duviols notes that Guaman Poma, adopting a Western way of thinking, used, along with other chroniclers, the concept of "ages", to describe supposed cycles, which was an important part of Ancient Greek thought. Main criticisms to the conception of pacha appeal to the lack of early colonial written sources in its favor. Other criticisms concern the notion of three realms in Inca cosmology. According to historian Juan Carlos Estenssoro, kay pacha is a missionary neologism, and, while other compounds may have been preexisting, the interpretation of pacha as "realm" could be attributed to Catholic missionaries. Furthermore, the Peruvian linguist Rodolfo Cerrón Palomino attributes the coining of the compounds entirely to Catholic missionaries' lexical planning. According to these criticisms, the spatial-temporal concept of pacha as "era", "stage" or "realm" would be an unjustified anachronistic attribution of Christian beliefs to Andean pre-Hispanic societies. However, many scholars, such as Nathan Wachtel and Juan de Ossio, defend the chronicle of Guaman Poma, and the conception of Pacha in pre-Hispanic times, Gregory Haimovich stating that parts of the work point to the existence of three realms in pre-Hispanic cosmology.

== See also ==
- Chakana
- Yanantin
