= Humberstone =

Humberstone may refer to:

== Place-names ==
- Humberstone, Leicestershire, now part of the City of Leicester, England
  - Humberstone & Hamilton, an electoral ward and administrative division of the City of Leicester, comprising in part the suburb Humberstone
  - Humberstone railway station
  - Humberstone Road railway station
- Humberstone Speedway, Port Colborne, Ontario, Canada
- Humberstone, Chile, a mining town in the Atacama Desert

== Other uses ==
- Humberstone (surname)
- Humberstone and Santa Laura Saltpeter Works, World Heritage sites in northern Chile
- Matthew Humberstone School (1882–2010), Cleethorpes, Lincolnshire, England

== See also ==
- Humberston, a village near Cleethorpes, Lincolnshire, England
- Humberston Wright, (fl. 1918–1947), British film actor
