= Humberstone, Chile =

Ghost town in Atacama of Chile

Humberstone
- Ghost town
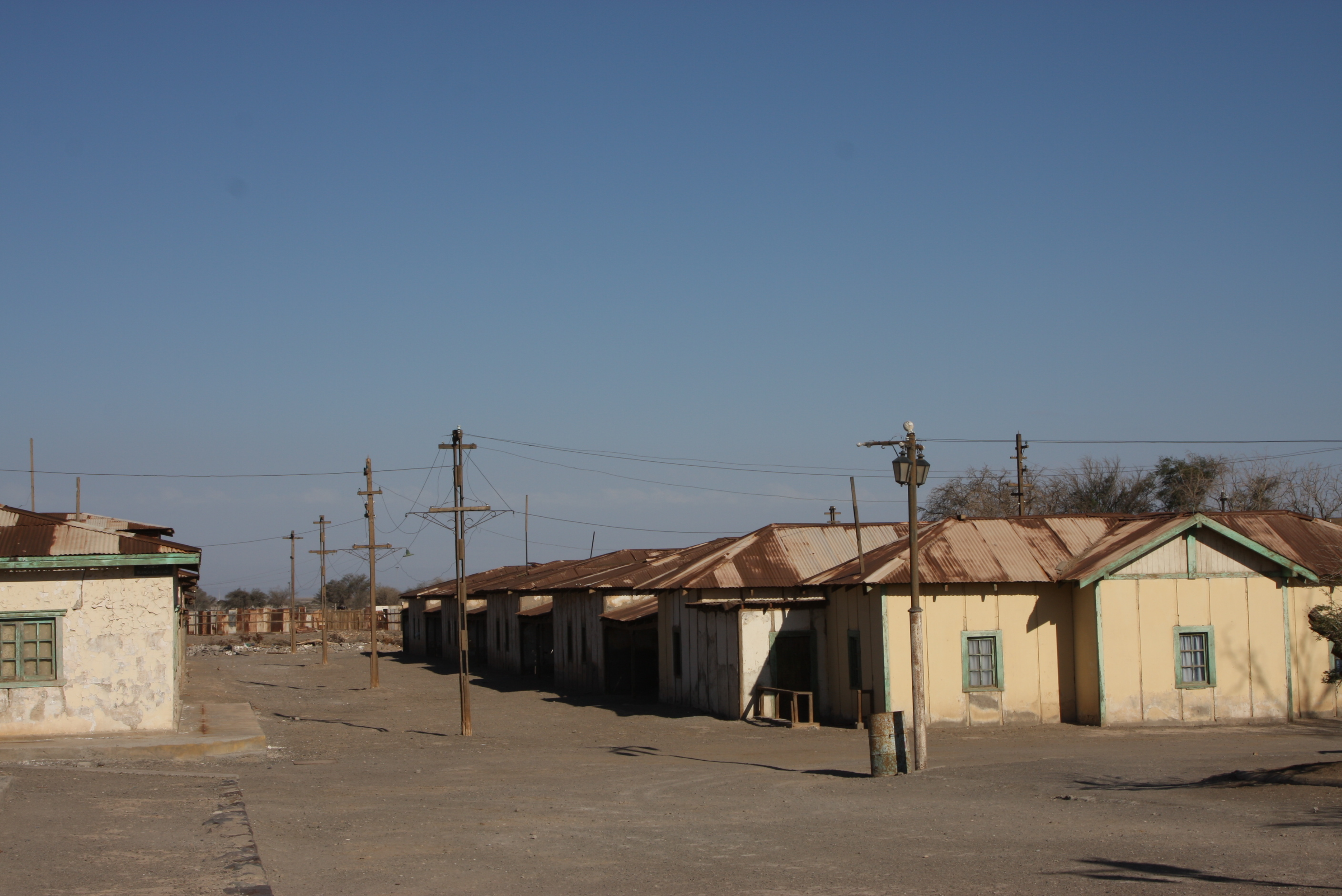
- Houses in Humberstone
- Coordinates: 20°12′29″S 69°47′41″W
- Country: Chile
- Region: Tarapacá
- Province: Tamarugal
- Commune: Pozo Almonte
- Established: 1872; 154 years ago
- Elevation: 1,047 m (3,435 ft)

Population (1960)
  - Total: ~ 3,700

UNESCO World Heritage Site
- Type: Cultural
- Criteria: ii, iii, iv
- Designated: 2005
- Part of: Humberstone and Santa Laura Saltpeter Works
- Reference no.: 1178
- Extensions: 2011, 2019
- Region: Latin America and the Caribbean
- Endangered: 2005–2019

Humberstone is a ghost town in the Atacama Desert of Chile.

== History ==
The town was founded as "La Palma" in 1872 for workers at the adjacent potassium nitrate extraction plant of the Peruvian Nitrate Company. James Thomas Humberstone later became the CEO of the Peruvian Nitrate Company.

== See also ==
- War of the Pacific
- Humberstone and Santa Laura Saltpeter Works
- List of Saltpeter works in Tarapacá and Antofagasta
