= Humberstone (surname) =

Humberstone or Humberston is a surname. Notable people with the surname include:

- Arthur Humberstone (1912–1999), British animator
- Chris Humberstone (1946–1999), English automobile designer
- Clara E. Speight-Humberston (1862-1936), Canadian research scientist and scientific writer
- H. Bruce Humberstone (1901–1984), American screen actor and film director
- Holly Humberstone (born 1999), English singer-songwriter
- James Thomas Humberstone (1850–1939), English chemical engineer
- Simon Humberstone (born 1987), British rugby Union player
- William Humberstone (1836–1922), Canadian politician
- William Humberstone (Leicester MP) (fl. 1377), English Member of Parliament
