= Chacabuco =

Abandoned town in Chile

Coordinates: 23°08′50″S 69°37′00″W

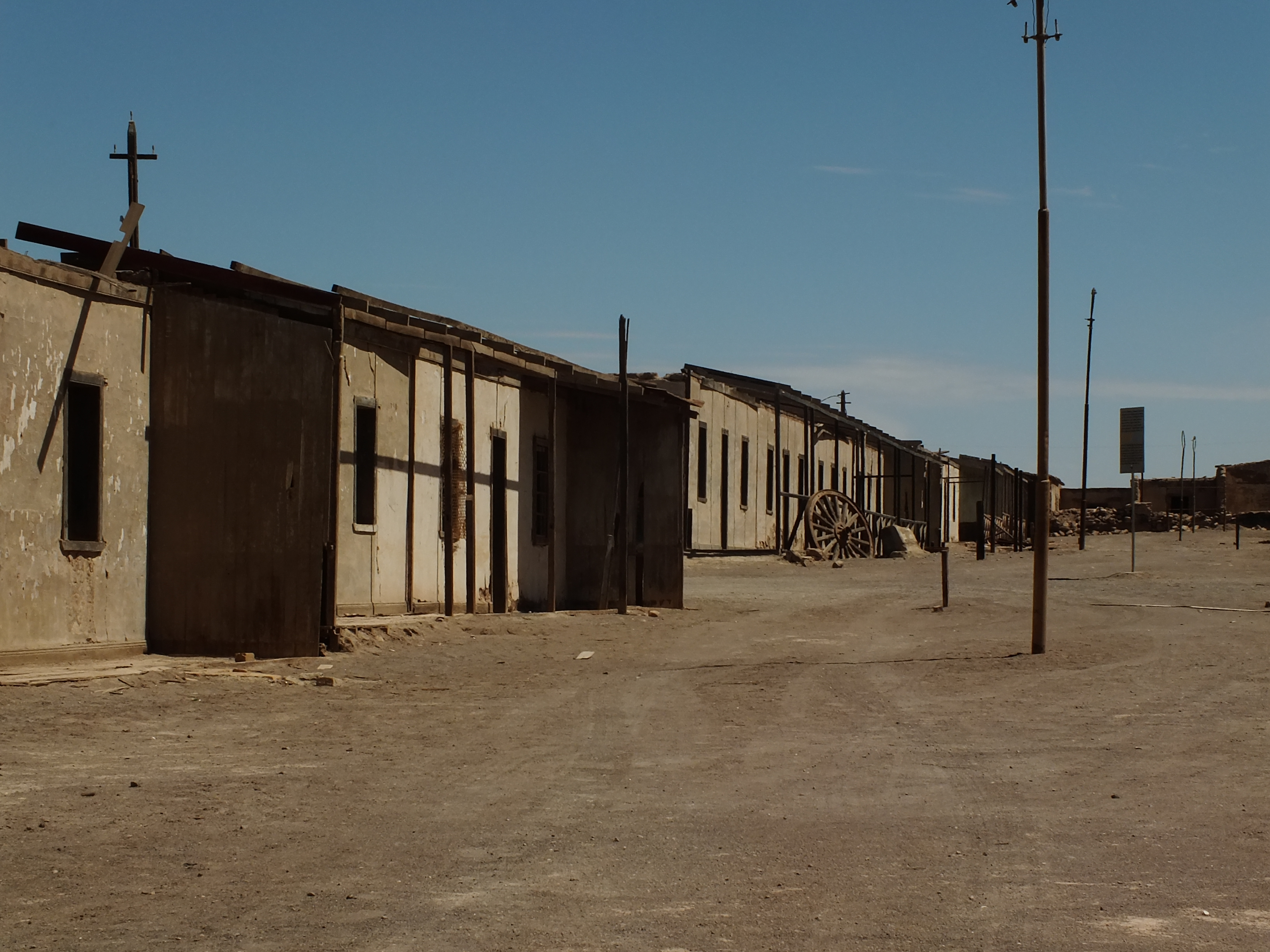
Ruins of Chacabuco

Chacabuco is one of the many abandoned nitrate or "saltpeter" towns ("oficinas salitreras" in Spanish) in the Atacama Desert of northern Chile. Other nitrate towns of the Atacama Desert include Humberstone and Santa Laura Saltpeter Works. Unlike most of the other ghost towns in the Atacama Desert, Chacabuco became a concentration camp during the Pinochet regime in 1973. To this day, it remains surrounded by approximately 98 lost landmines, left by the Chilean military when Chacabuco was used as a prison camp.

== Nitrate town history ==
Founded in 1924 by the Lautaro Nitrate Company Ltd., Chacabuco soon fell into ruin as the nitrate mining boom in Chile came to an abrupt halt at the end of the 1930s. Synthetic nitrate had been invented in Germany at the turn of the 20th century and by the 1930s and 40s had severely crippled northern Chile's nitrate industry. What had accounted for virtually 50% of Chile's Gross National Product fell to almost zero within a few decades. A total of 170 nitrate towns were shut down throughout Chile's Atacama Desert, only one remains open today, María Elena, about 95 kilometers north of Chacabuco. Chacabuco shut its doors in 1938. As a town, it had only survived 14 years.

== Concentration camp history ==
In 1971, president Salvador Allende declared Chacabuco a Historic Monument of Chile, at which point restoration began. But in 1973, after the military coup, Pinochet turned it into a concentration camp until the end of 1974. As a concentration camp, it held up to 1,800 prisoners many of whom were doctors, lawyers, artists, writers, professors and workers from all over Chile.

== Chacabuco today ==
By the 1990s, Chacabuco was in need of extensive restoration and several international organizations began the restoration of parts of Chacabuco. In 1991, a former political prisoner of Chacabuco, Roberto Saldívar, returned to Chacabuco in order to live in the abandoned town and guard it against vandalism and pillaging. He lived there almost completely alone until January 2006. Pedro Barreda replaced Roberto when he left as caretaker of Chacabuco. Currently living in Chacabuco alone, Pedro considers himself to be Roberto's apprentice and remains dedicated to the cause Roberto started.

== See also ==
- List of Saltpeter works in Tarapacá and Antofagasta
