= Humberstone and Santa Laura Saltpeter Works =

UNESCO World Heritage Site
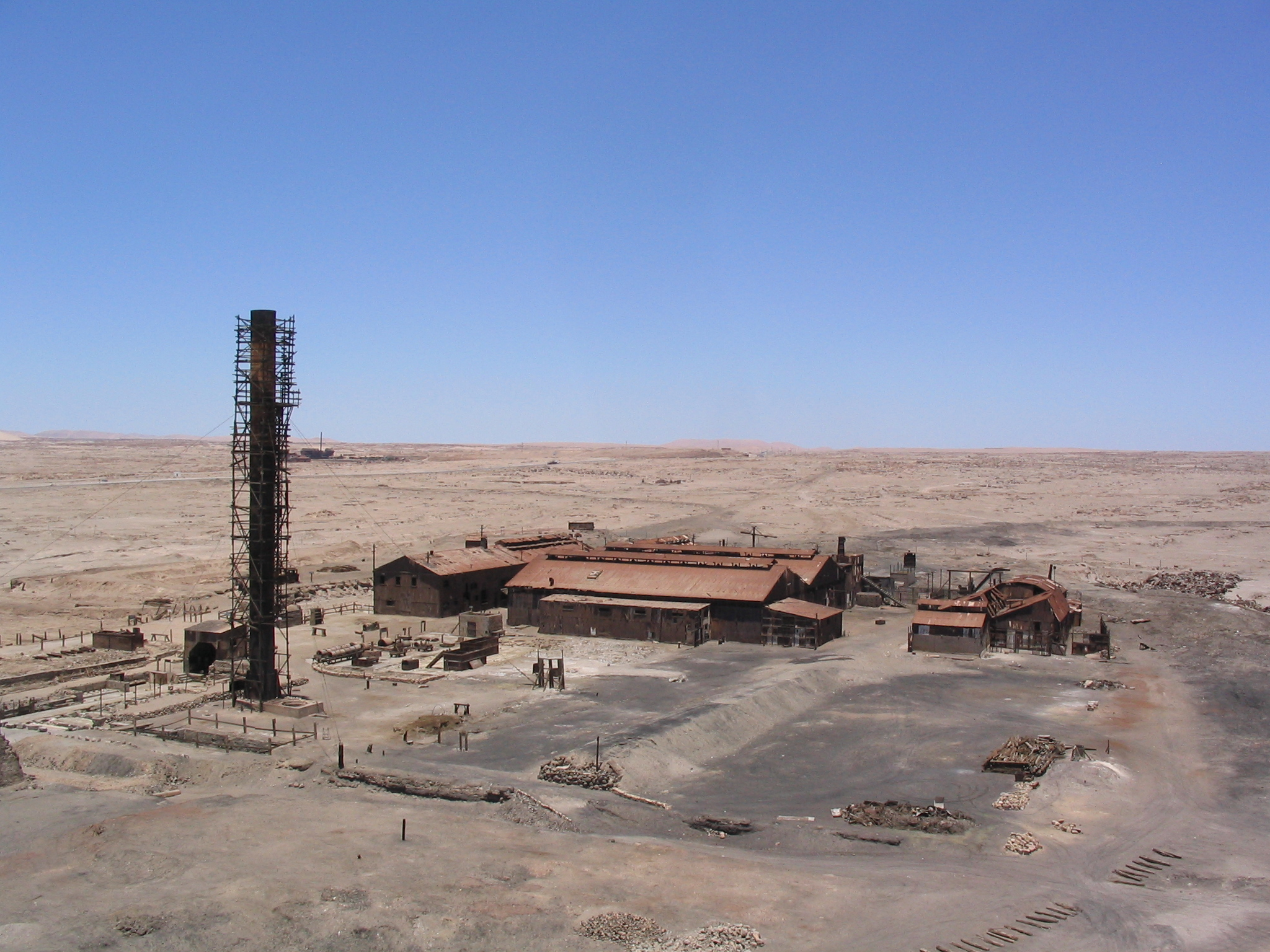
- Industrial sector of Humberstone Saltpeter Works

- Location within Tarapacá Region Location within Chile
- Location: Pozo Almonte, Tamarugal Province, Tarapacá Region, Chile
- Includes: Humberstone, Chile 20°12′30″S 69°47′43″W; Santa Laura, Chile 20°12′40″S 69°48′45″W
- Criteria: Cultural: (ii), (iii), (iv)
- Reference: 1178bis
- Inscription: 2005 (29th Session)
- Extensions: 2011
- Endangered: 2005–2019
- Area: 573.48 ha (1,417.1 acres)
- Buffer zone: 12,055 ha (29,790 acres)

Humberstone and Santa Laura Saltpeter Works are two former saltpeter refineries located in northern Chile. They were declared a UNESCO World Heritage Site in 2005, as a testament to the historical importance of saltpeter mining in Chile and the culture and social agenda that developed around it in the late 19th century. The works were placed on the World Heritage List in Danger that same year, due to the fragility of the derelict buildings, but were removed in 2019 following significant restoration and conservation work.

== Geography ==
Humberstone and Santa Laura are located 48.1 km east of the city of Iquique in the Atacama Desert in the Tarapacá Region in northern Chile. Situated in the commune of Pozo Almonte, these sites represent the most well-known of the former saltpeter works or "nitrate towns" in the region. Other notable saltpeter works include Chacabuco, Maria Elena, Pedro de Valdivia, Puelma and Aguas Santas.

== History ==
In 1872, when the area was still part of Peru, the Guillermo Wendell Nitrate Extraction Company founded the Santa Laura saltpeter works. Its owner, Lima native Abraham Guillermo Wendell Tizon, obtained a concession of 100 stakes from the Peruvian government to operate in Cala Cala and other areas. In the same year, the Peru Nitrate Company founded the "La Palma" works under James Thomas Humberstone. Both works grew quickly, becoming busy towns characterized by English-style architecture.

While La Palma became one of the largest saltpeter extractors in the entire Tarapacá region, Santa Laura struggled with low production. It was taken over in 1902 by the Tamarugal Nitrate Company. In 1913, Santa Laura halted production until 1920 when the Shanks extraction process was implemented, enhancing productivity. This modernization occurred between 1918 and 1920 under the direction of builder William J. Clayton for the London Nitrate Co. Ltd.

The economic model collapsed during the Great Depression of 1929 due to the development of ammonia synthesis by Germans Fritz Haber and Carl Bosch, which enabled industrial fertilizer production. Practically bankrupt, both works were acquired by COSATAN (Compañía Salitrera de Tarapacá y Antofagasta) in 1934. COSATAN renamed La Palma as "Oficina Santiago Humberstone" in honor of its founder, who had introduced and applied the Shanks system and is considered one of the fathers of the saltpeter industry. The company attempted to produce competitive natural saltpeter by modernizing Humberstone, which became the most successful saltpeter works by 1940.

Both works were abandoned in 1960 after rapid decline caused COSATAN to disappear in 1958. At their peak, they housed approximately 4,000 people, with Santa Laura reaching 426 inhabitants and Humberstone exceeding 3,700. In 1970, after becoming ghost towns in the Atacama Desert, they were declared national monuments. Despite this protection, they suffered from dismantling and looting.

In 2001, Humberstone was remodeled when it served as a film set for the soap opera Pampa Ilusión. The celebration of Saltpeter Week became key for former pampinos (saltpeter workers) to fight for the protection of the office. This led to the formation of the Saltpeter Museum Corporation, which took steps to have both saltpeter works declared a World Cultural Heritage site by UNESCO in 2005.

== Architecture and features ==
Humberstone and Santa Laura are among the main tourist attractions of Tamarugal Province. Although years of weathering and looting had severely deteriorated these sites, impressive restoration work by the Saltpeter Museum Corporation and the Tarapacá Regional Government has enabled many of the main spaces.

Most of Humberstone's central buildings, including its large theater, church, and company store (pulpería), were constructed entirely or partially from imported Oregon pine wood. The site reveals stark contrasts between the large administrative buildings and owner residences versus the small dwellings of the pampino workers. Humberstone provided housing according to the worker's position within the company (employees, professionals, and workers; married and single), with access to drinking water, electricity, and sewerage.

Santa Laura is notable for its enormous chimney visible from great distances, its processing plant ("la máquina") made of Oregon pine and iron where the cooking pots (cachuchos) were located, and other interesting facilities including the crushing plant, power house, administration building, and main square.

== Gallery ==
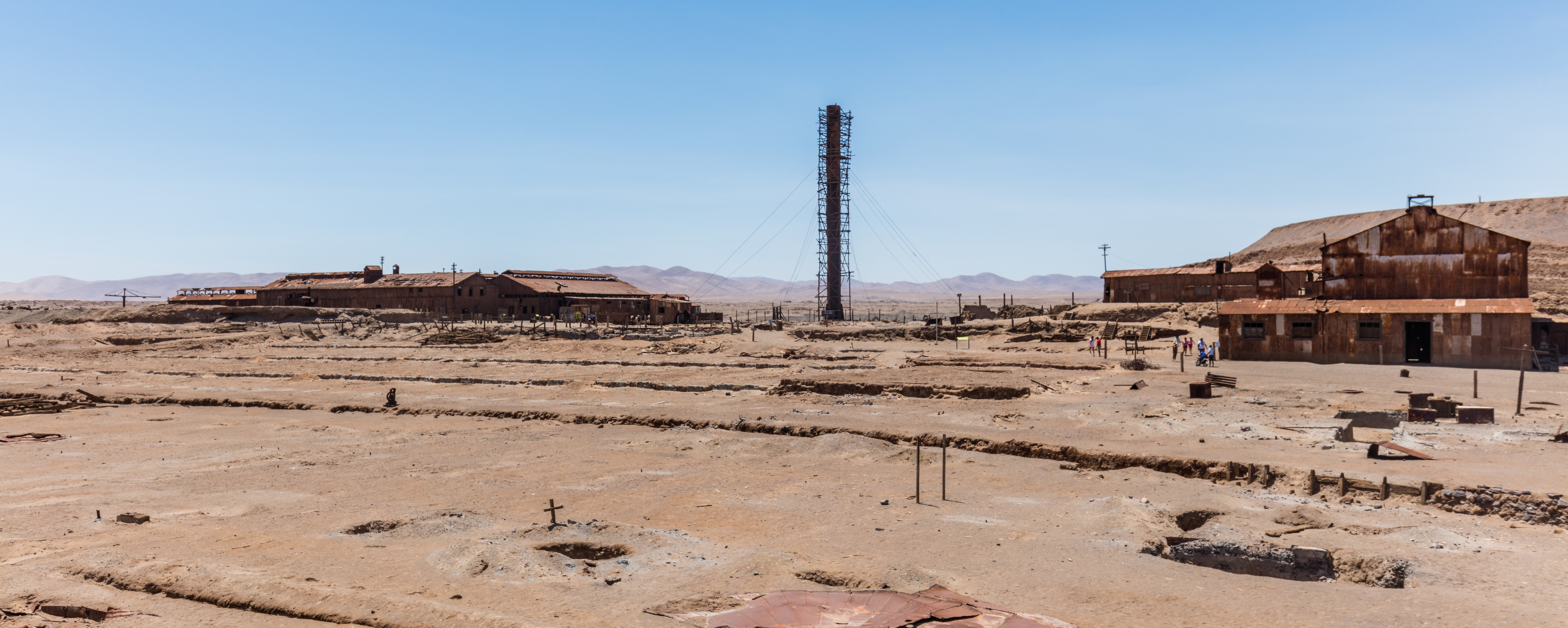
View of Humberstone

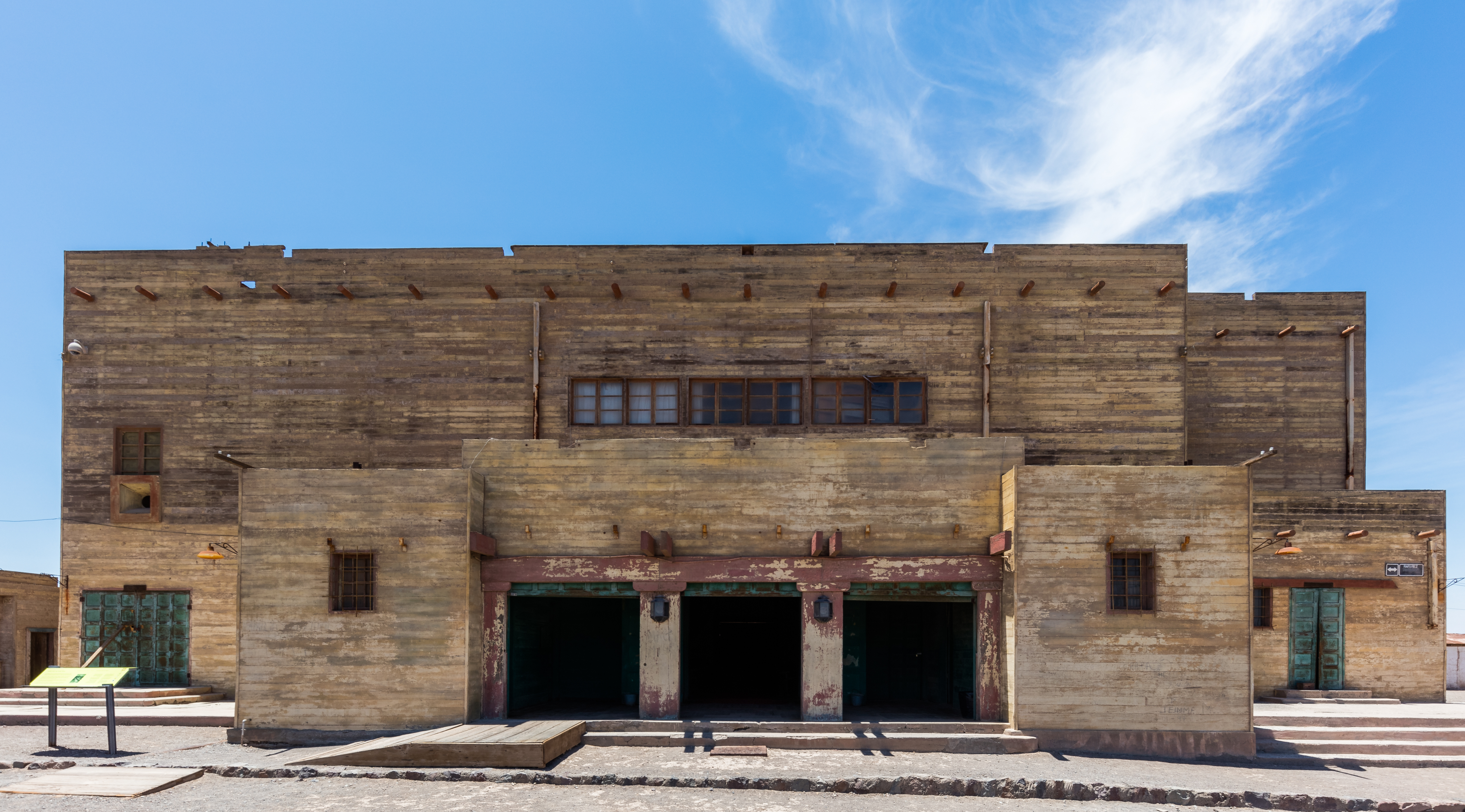
Exterior of Humberstone Theater

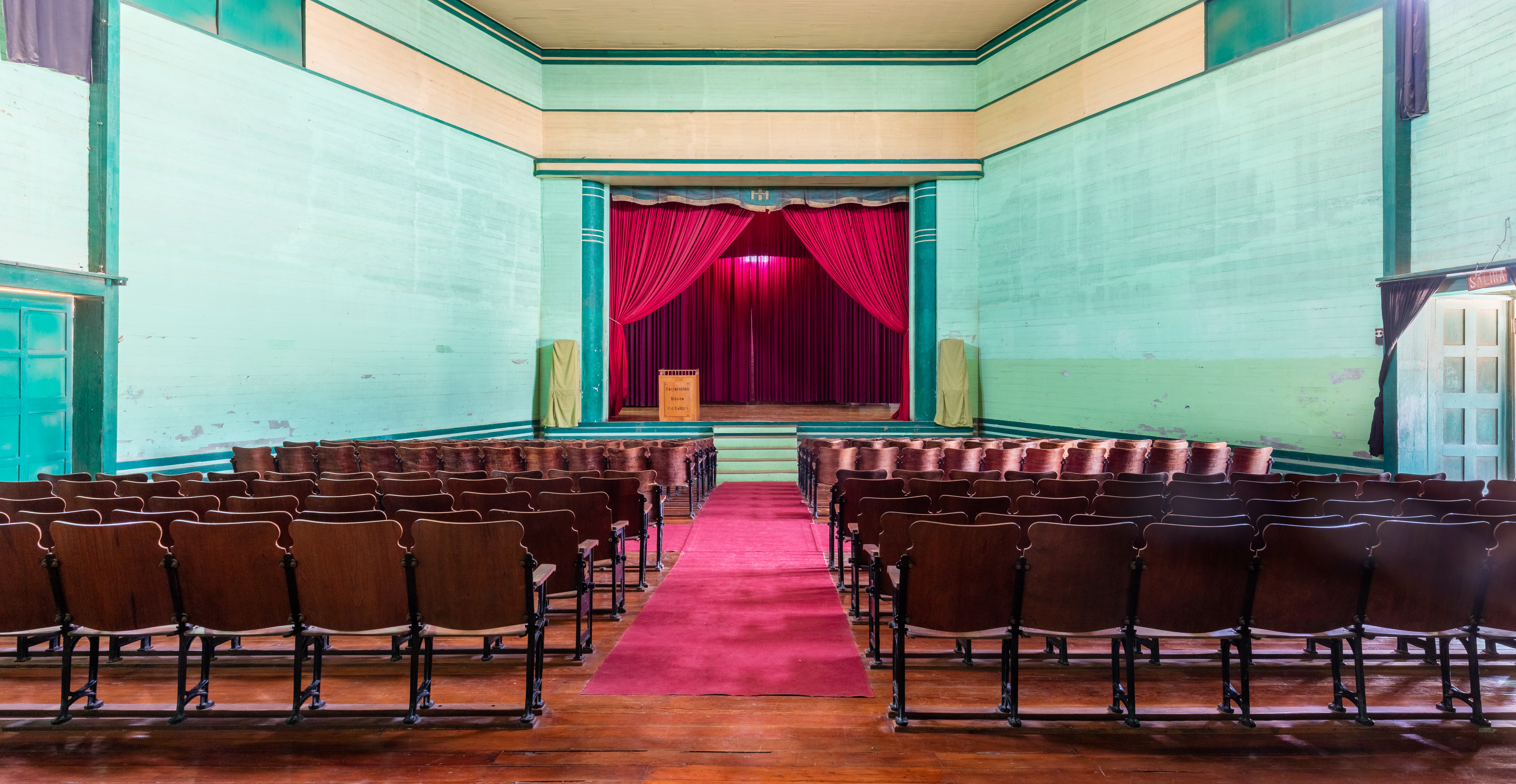
Interior of Humberstone Theater

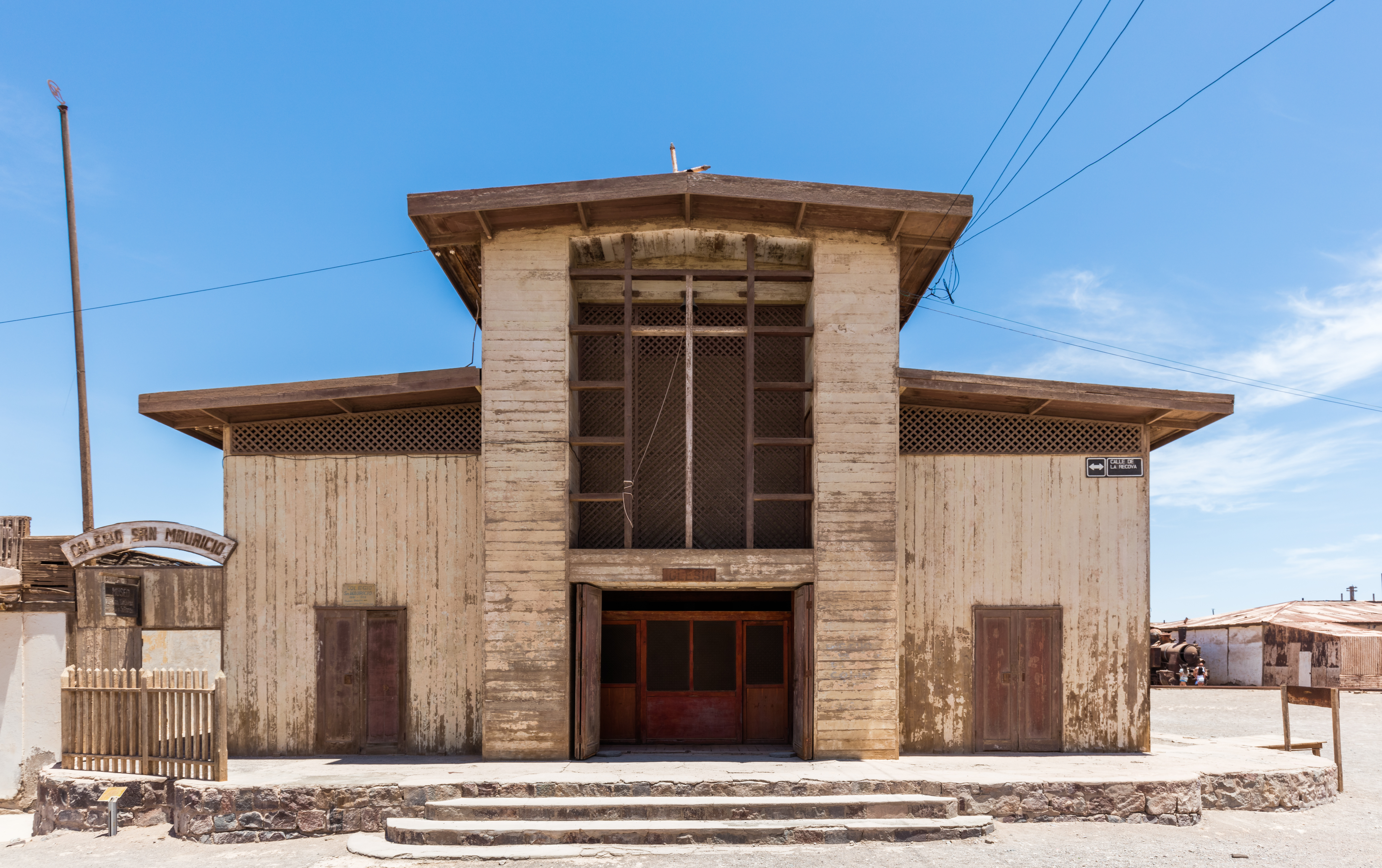
Exterior of Humberstone Church

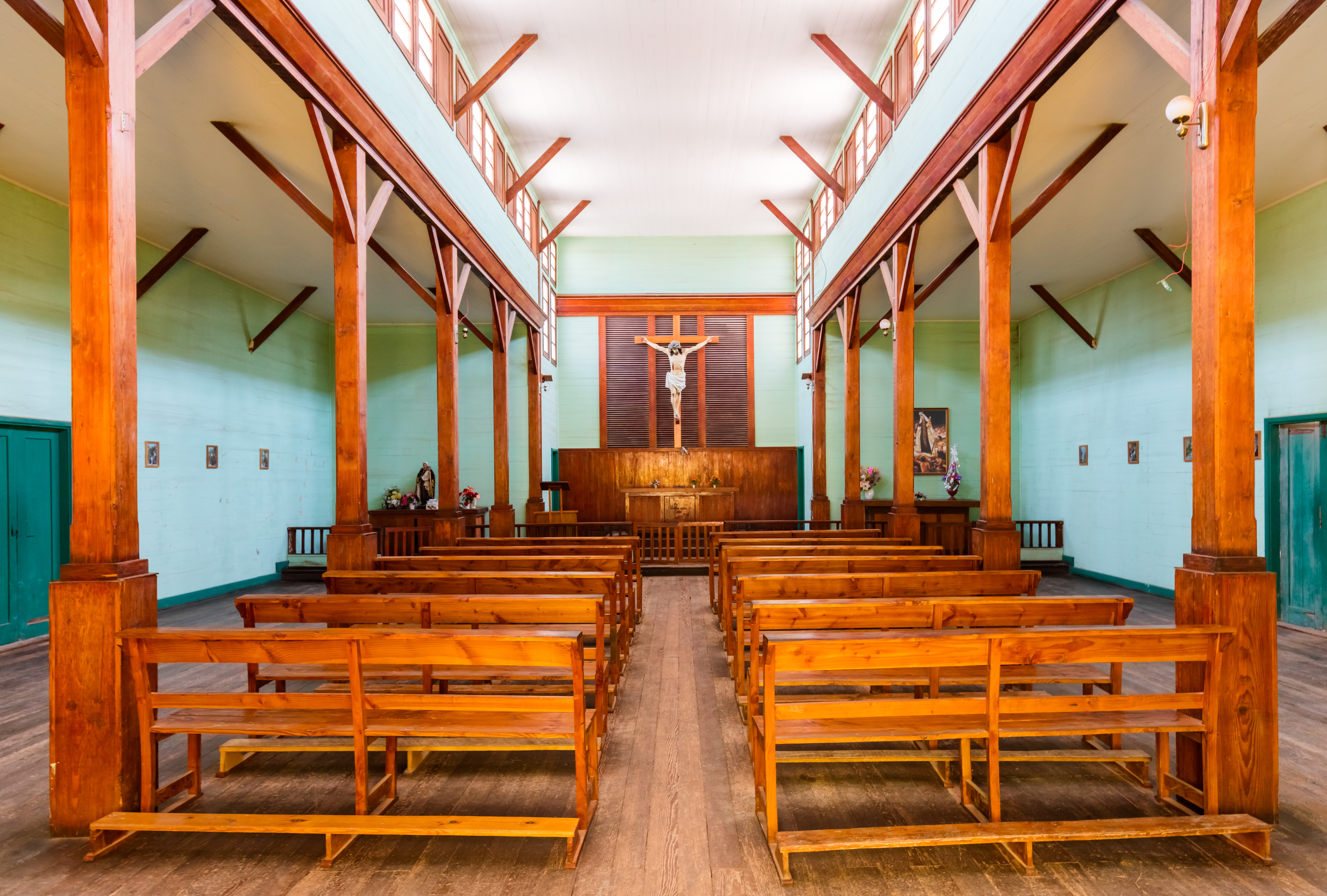
Interior of Humberstone Church

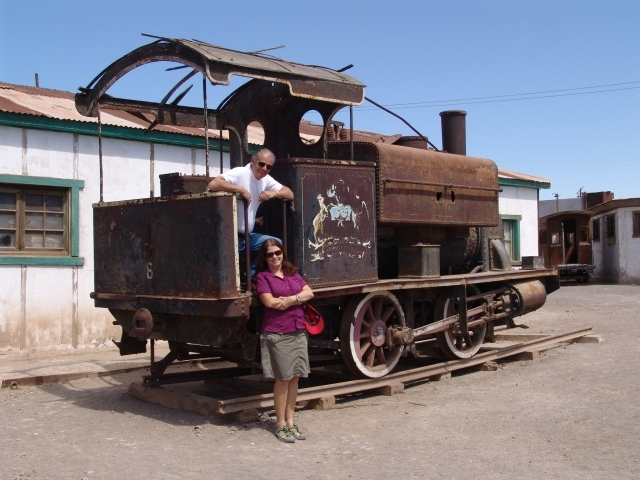
Humberstone Locomotive

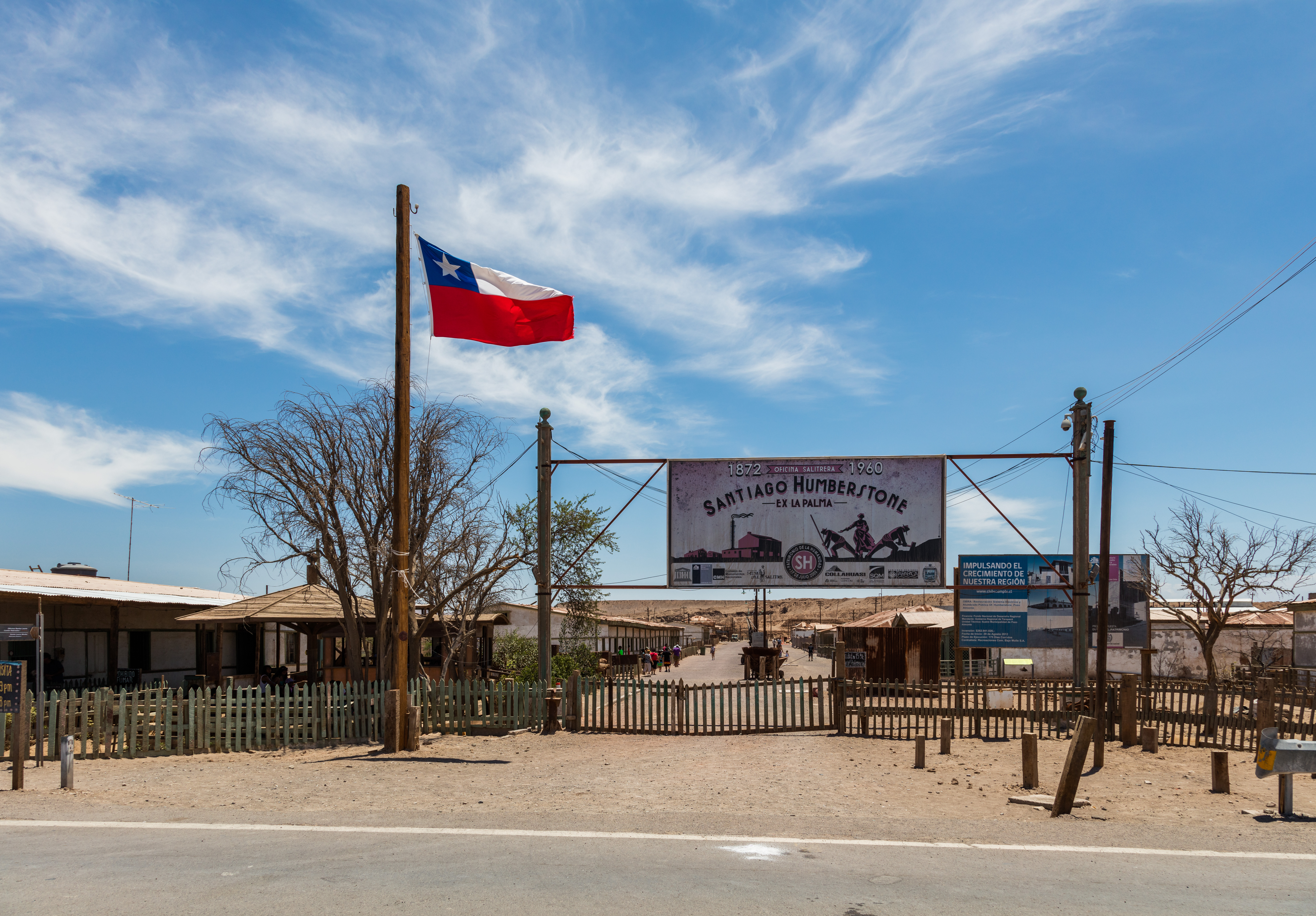
Entrance to Humberstone

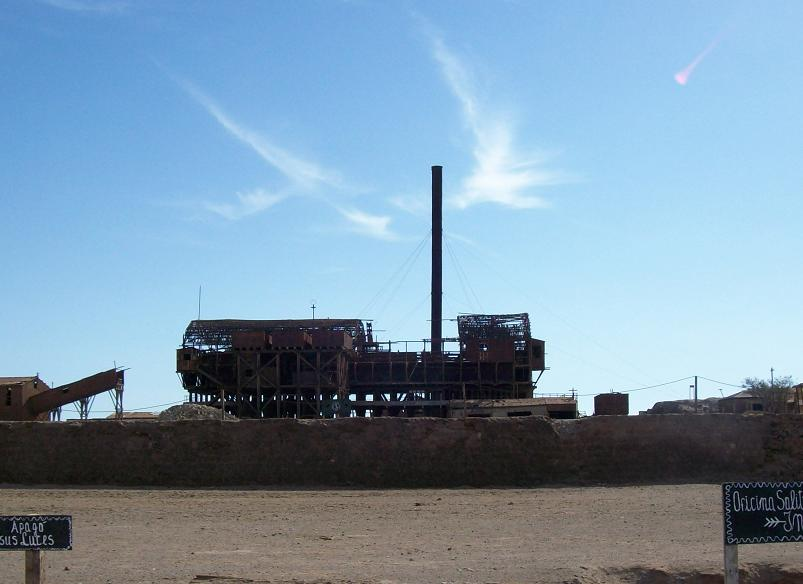
Santa Laura plant

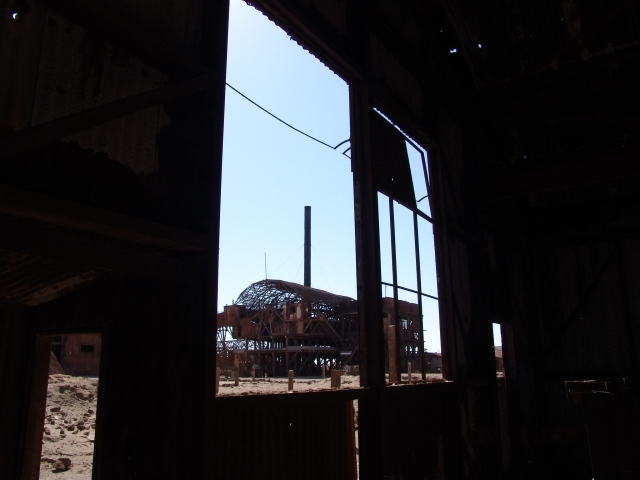
Santa Laura Saltpeter Works

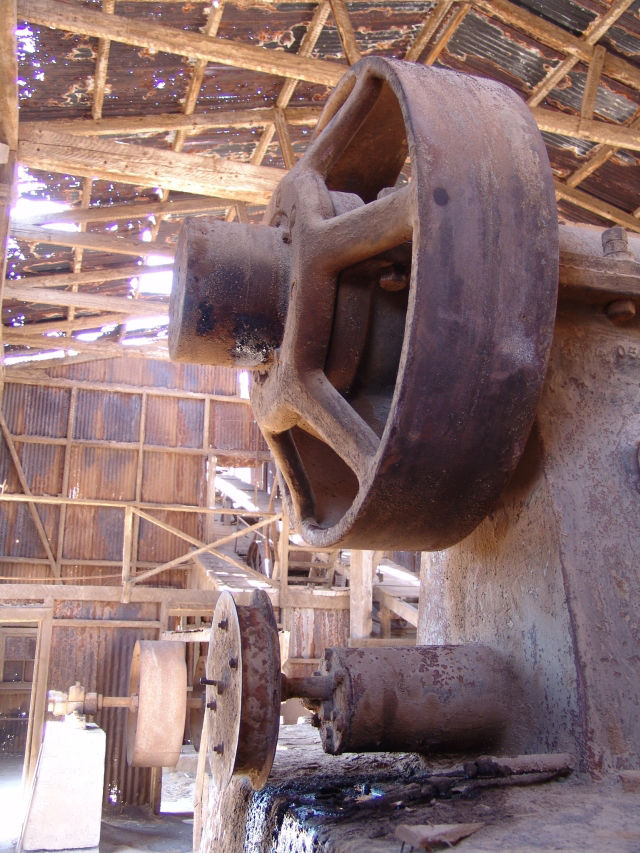
Abandoned Machinery at Santa Laura

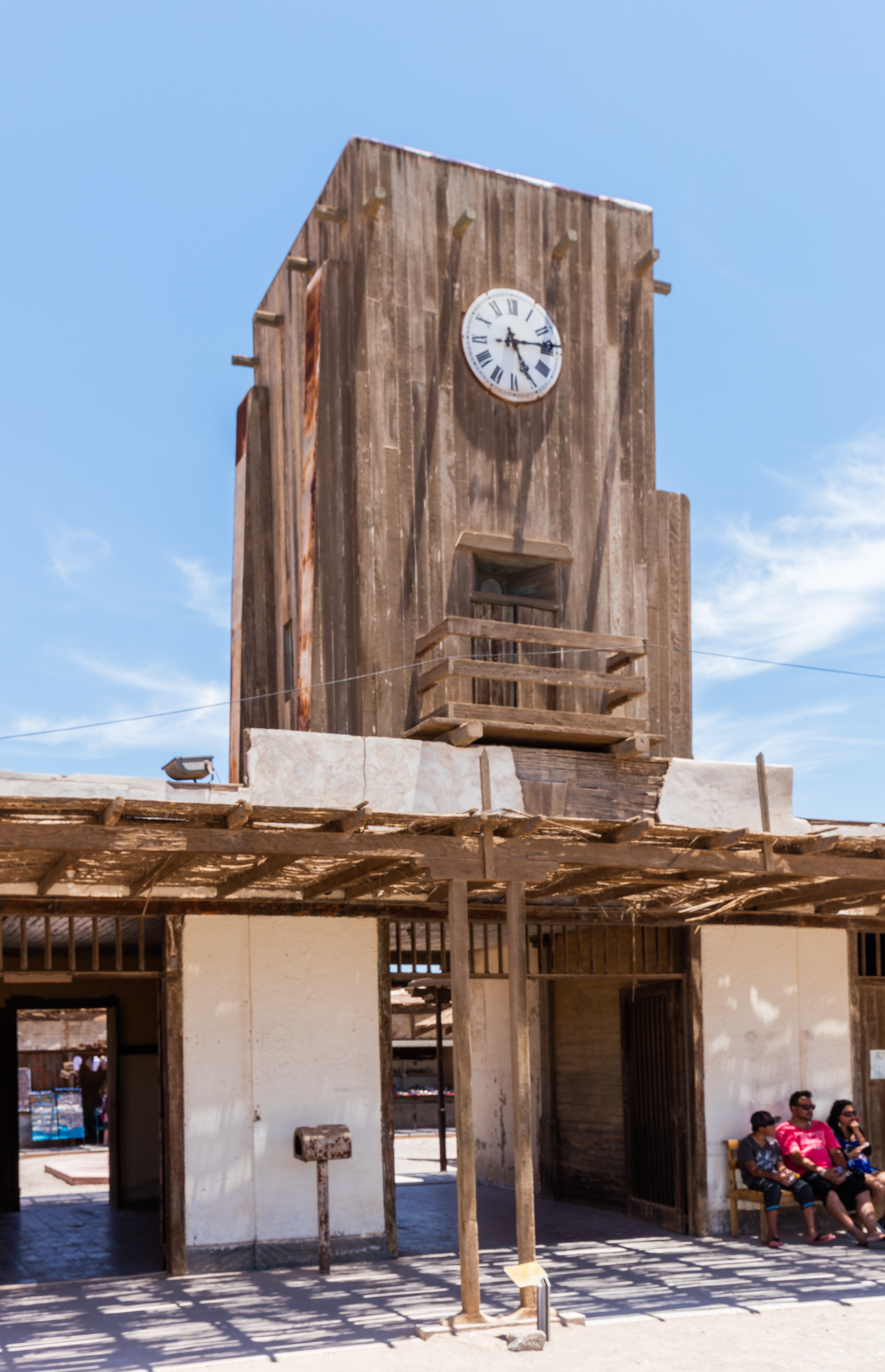
Clock at Humberstone

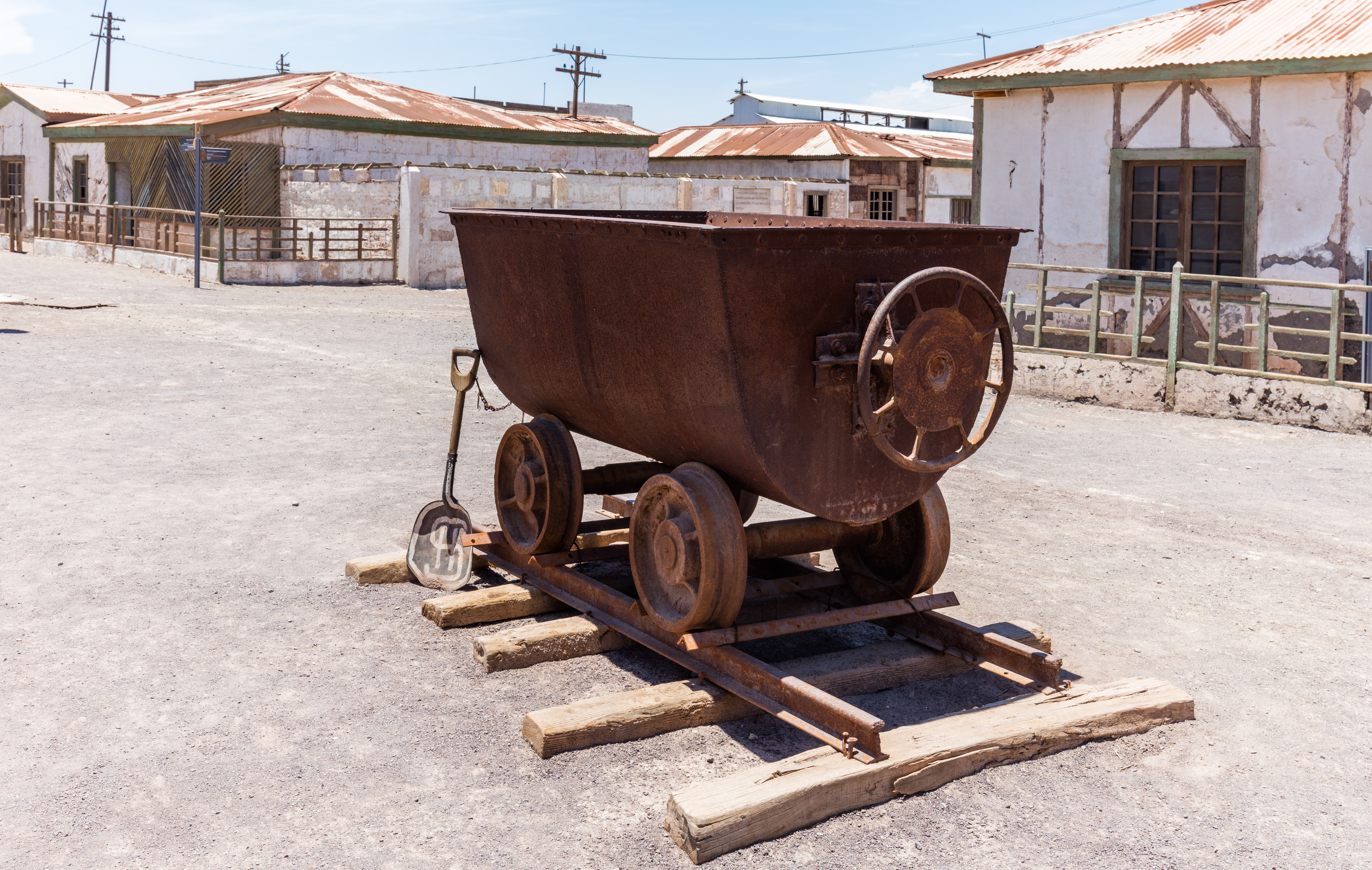
Mining cart

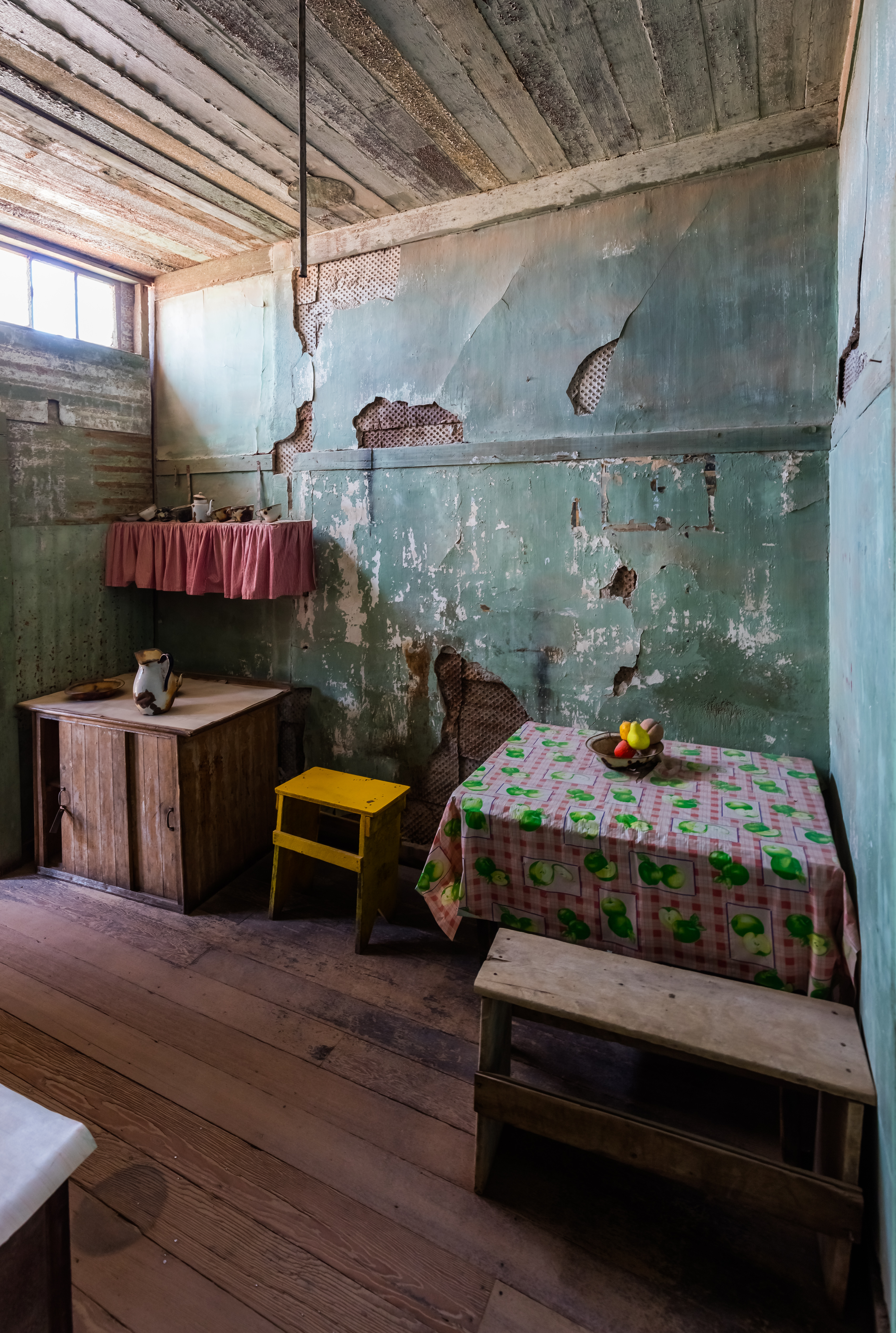
Kitchen in a worker's residence

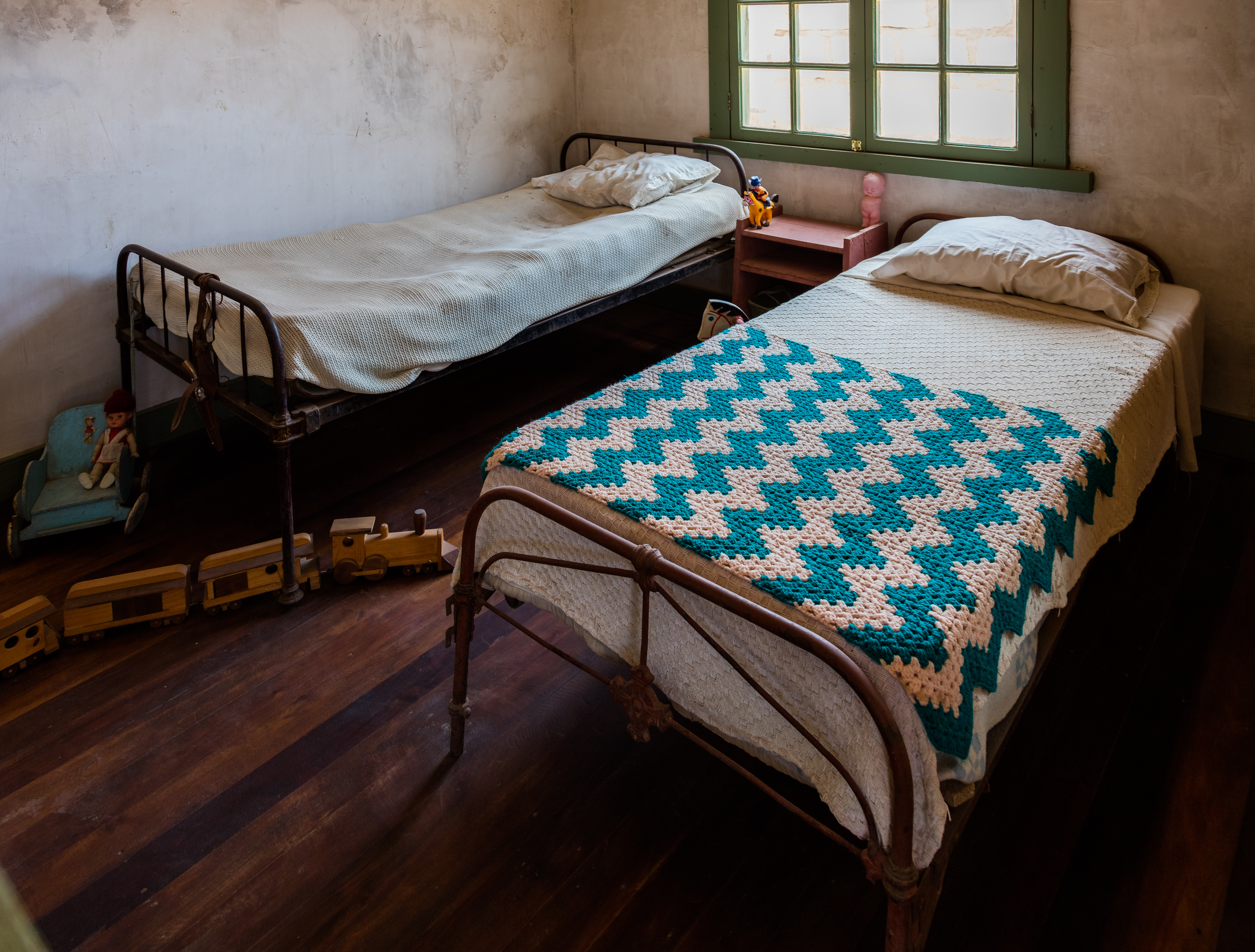
Bedroom in worker's residence

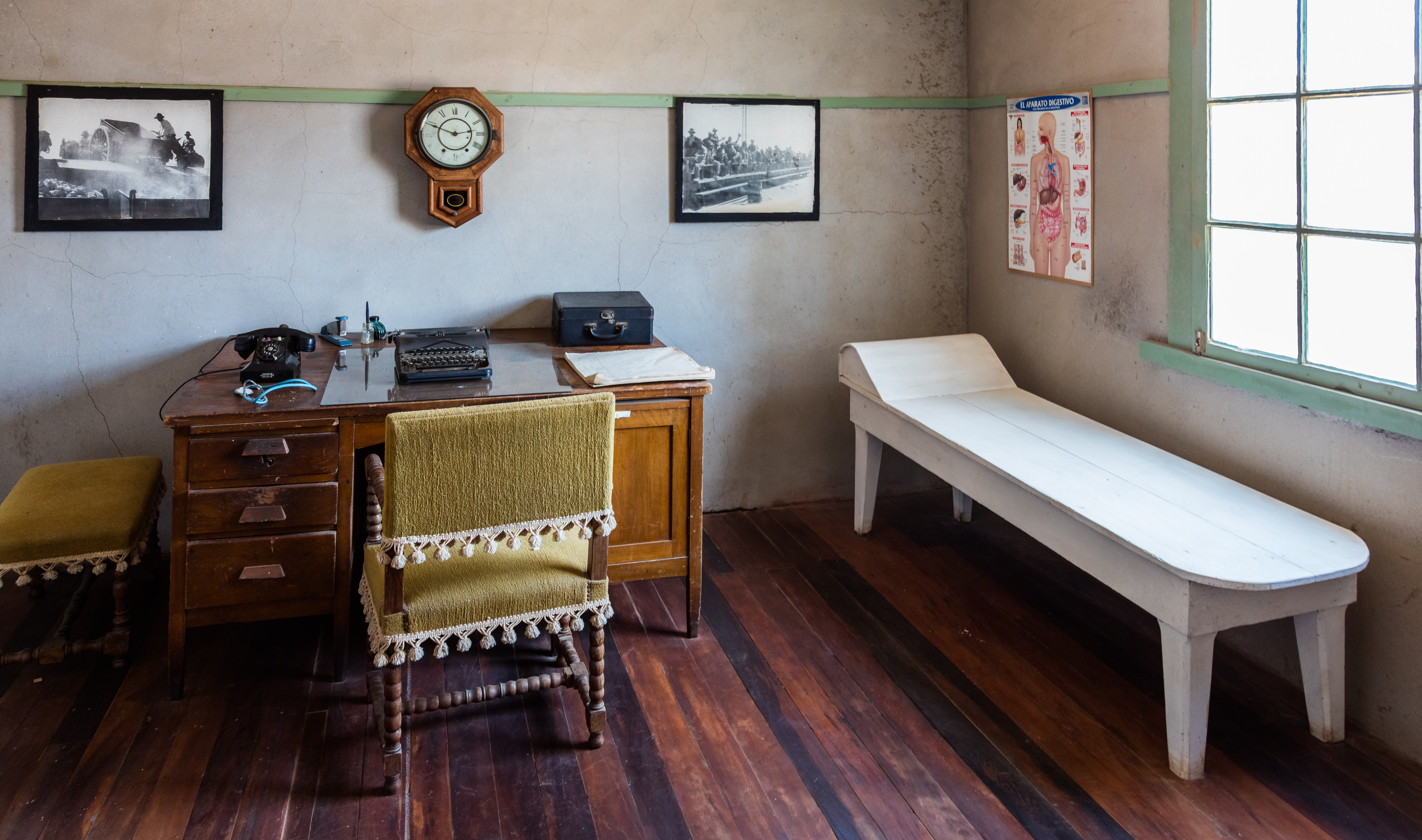
Doctor's office

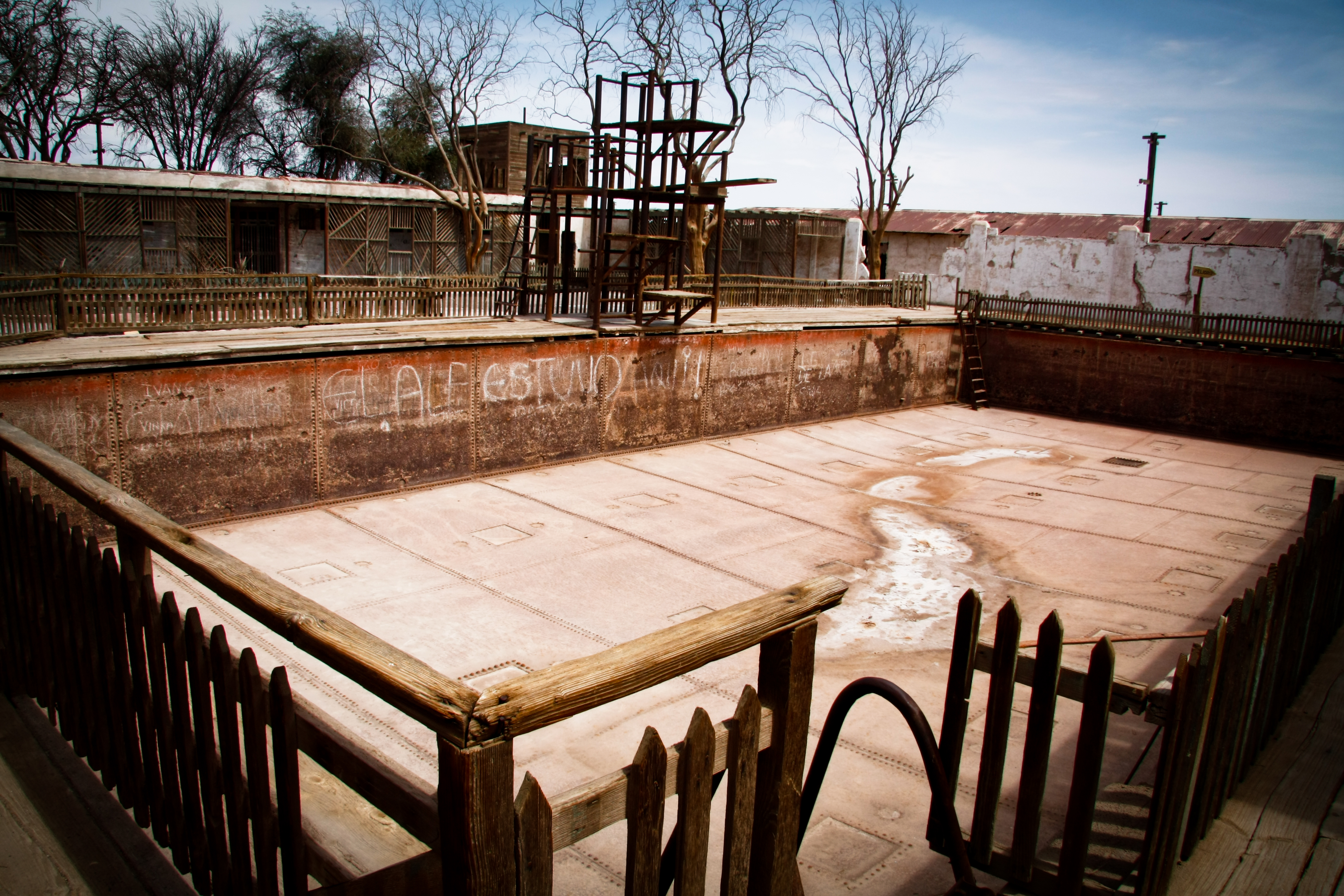
Steel swimming pool

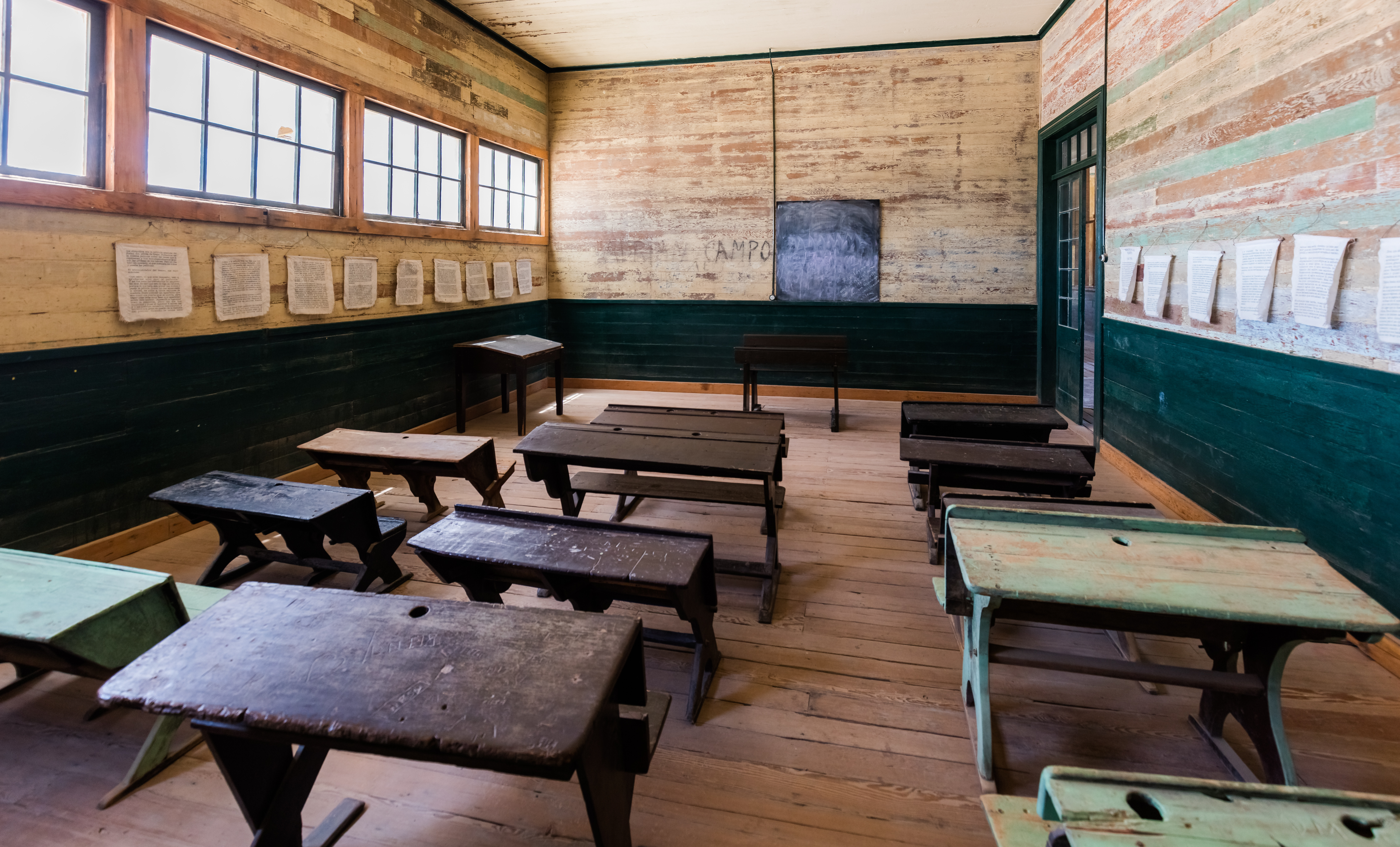
School desks

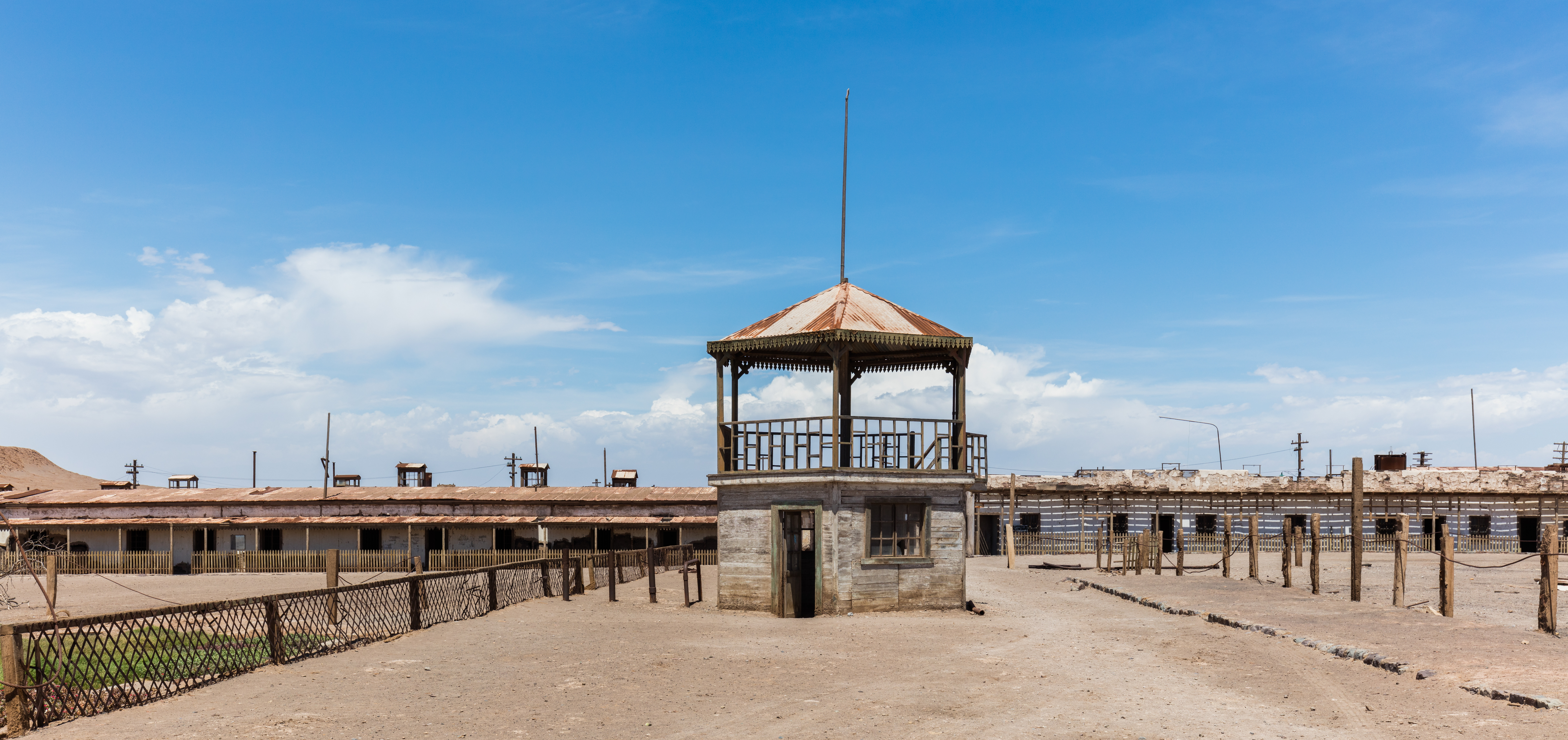
Kiosk

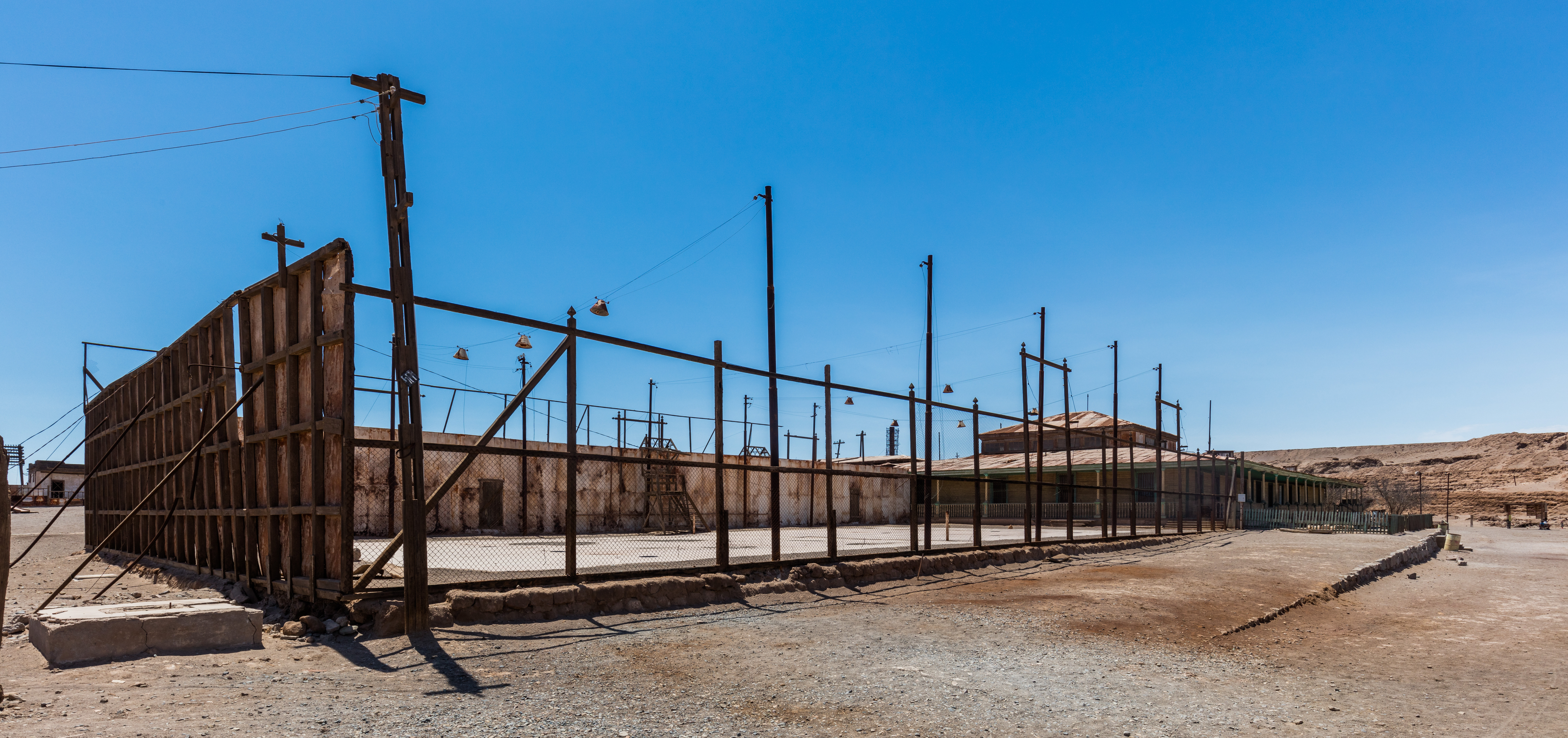
Tennis courts

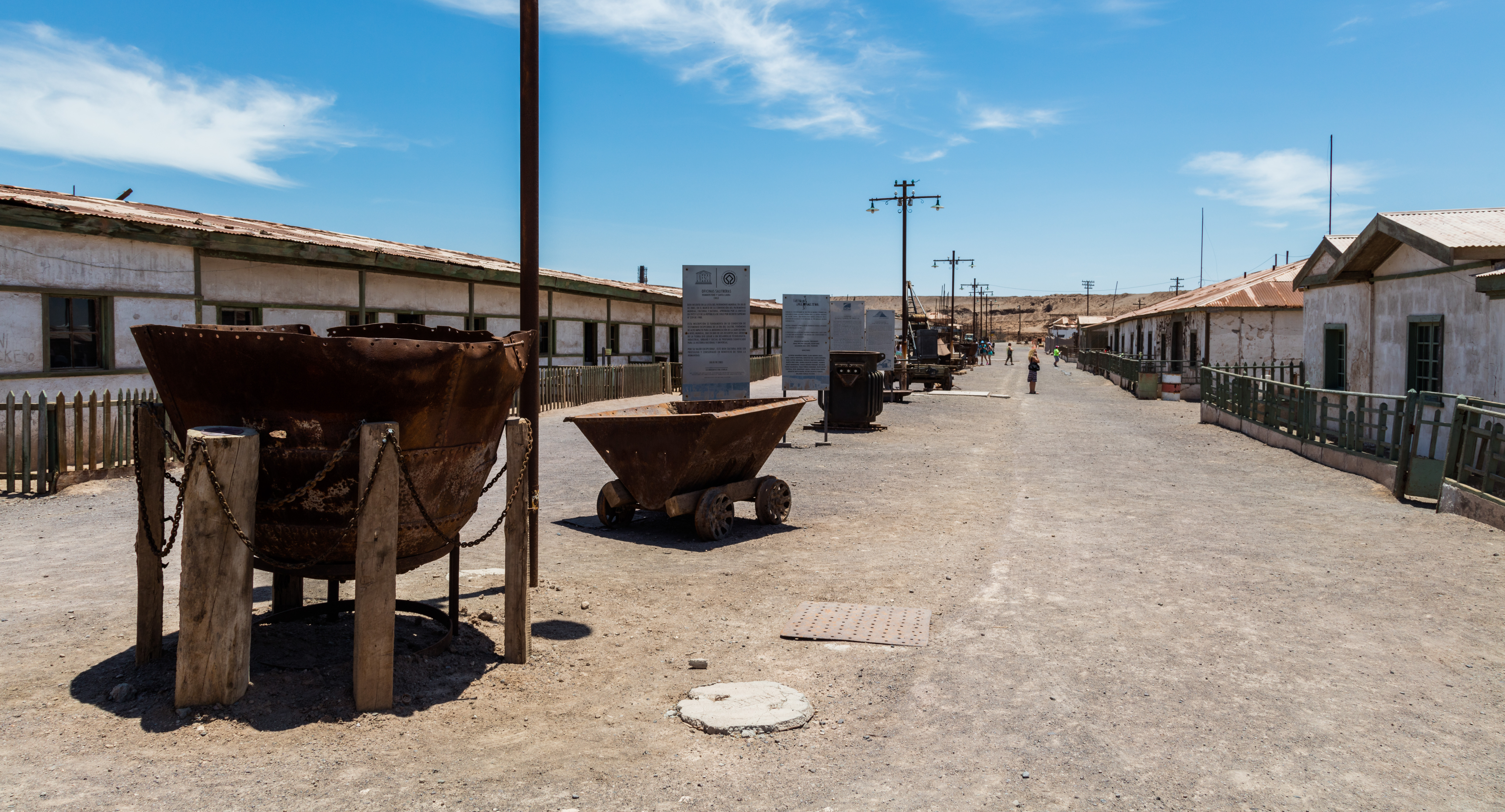
Street in the saltpeter works

== See also ==
- War of the Pacific
- List of Saltpeter works in Tarapacá and Antofagasta
- Pampa Ilusión
