= List of saltpeter works in Tarapacá and Antofagasta =

The use of Nitratine or Chilean Saltpeter once an important source of nitrates for fertilizer and other chemical uses including gunpowder and fireworks.

The commencement of the export of nitrates to the Europe and the US in the 1830s marked the most important milestone in the history of the nitrate industry and brought consequences for the economies of the three countries sharing the Atacama Desert: Chile, Perú and Bolivia.

Antofagasta was founded in 1868, in October 1869 the extraction of nitrates commenced in Oficina Salar del Carmen, the first nitrate producing plant. In 1871, the Nitrate Railway was inaugurated, running from Iquique to La Noria in Peru. In 1873, the Peruvian Government established the Nitrate Trust (state monopoly), which was controlled from Tarapacá until the 1879–1883 "War of the Pacific". This political event was based on the boom of new "Oficinas salitreras" ("Saltpeter works") of quarrying nitratine to extract nitrate.

Since World War I the industry has been supplanted by fixing nitrogen from the air as the main source of nitrogen.

This is a list of saltpeter works in the Tarapacá and Antofagasta regions. The information regarding Saltpeter works on this page is compiled from the data supplied by the National Geospatial-Intelligence Agency, Country Files (GNS). Unique Feature Identifier (UFI) is a number which uniquely identifies a Geoname feature. Same UFI means same feature.

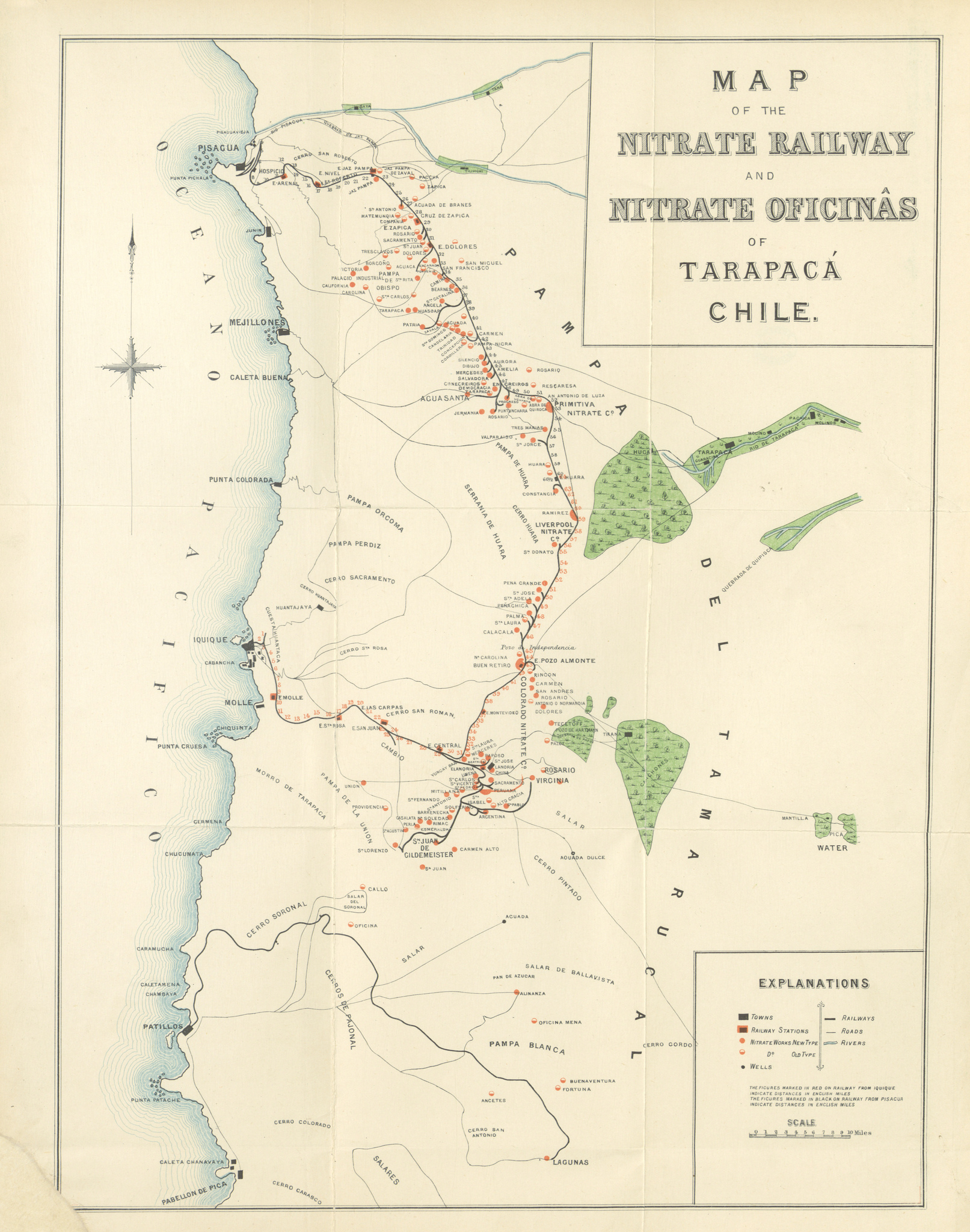
1890 map of salpeter works in Tarapacá

List of Saltpeter works in Tarapacá and Antofagasta Region

Oficina	Latitude	Longitude	UFI
Trinidad	-19.550751	-70.085782	-894178
Paccha	-19.565059	-70.023938	-894115
Jazpampa	-19.572428	-70.023959	-894089
San Antonio de Zapiga	-19.617482	-69.978589	-894147
Aragón	-19.625763	-69.959791	-894032
Enriqueta	-19.651981	-69.961225	-894076
Sacramento	-19.658865	-69.960986	-894143
Carolina	-19.666667	-70.05	-894055
San Patricio	-19.671302	-69.949181	-894156
Los Pozos	-19.673801	-69.983738	-894102
California	-19.676873	-70.049429	-894048
Dolores	-19.677805	-69.945837	-879800
Victoria	-19.694192	-70.011317	-894184
Unión	-19.70017	-69.953725	-894179
Sal dei Obispo	-19.701493	-69.970242	-894165
Santa Rita	-19.701493	-69.970242	-894165
Camiña	-19.705671	-69.917204	-894050
Porvenir	-19.714015	-69.931426	-894129
Limón	-19.7	-69.966667	-894099
Ángela Vieja	-19.741527	-69.908196	-894029
Chinquiquiray	-19.744675	-69.940149	-894060
La Patria	-19.755316	-69.935761	-894092
Aguada	-19.774055	-69.908088	-894021
Asturias	-19.787698	-69.897289	-894035
Amelia	-19.837628	-69.861603	-894026
Aurora	-19.845979	-69.856975	-894037
Mercedes	-19.855886	-69.859302	-894109
Josefina	-19.872306	-69.82562	-894090
Progreso	-19.872555	-69.835088	-894131
Agua Santa	-19.881435	-69.876308	-894022
Barcelona	-19.888829	-69.791632	-873177
Slavia	-19.891475	-69.852938	-894174
Primitiva	-19.918645	-69.804353	-894130
Las Tres Marías	-19.942453	-69.813213	-894094
Valparaíso	-19.952048	-69.830192	-894181
San Jorge	-19.958356	-69.813581	-894151
Santa Rosa de Huara	-20.000584	-69.781812	-901160
Constancia	-20.010831	-69.775747	-894065
Ramírez	-20.050269	-69.743608	-894135
Santiago	-20.051856	-69.768544	-894166
Mapocho	-20.083333	-69.75	-894104
San Donato	-20.108486	-69.74967	-894148
Peña Grande	-20.116667	-69.783333	-894121
Baquedano	-20.134625	-69.755307	-894042
San José	-20.16164	-69.777209	-900430
Peña Chica, Oficina	-20.166667	-69.833333	-895706
Kerima	-20.177153	-69.78238	-885584
Peña Chica	-20.180779	-69.801984	-894120
Humberstone (Ex-La Palma)	-20.208047	-69.795423	-884741
Santa Laura	-20.211143	-69.812979	-901026
Nebraska	-20.2	-69.85	-893375
Cala-Cala	-20.227976	-69.799378	-874636
Buen Retiro	-20.233333	-69.816667	-894047
Carmen Bajo	-20.273339	-69.789996	-894054
San Andrés	-20.283333	-69.783333	-894145
San Manuel	-20.287568	-69.772137	-894153
Serena	-20.296056	-69.775357	-894172
San Esteban	-20.316667	-69.75	-894150
Sara	-20.325079	-69.753255	-894168
Las Carpas	-20.333333	-70.016667	-887732
La Tirana	-20.335518	-69.656707	-888534
Paposo	-20.35	-69.866667	-894118
Limeña	-20.366667	-69.9	-894098
Cholita	-20.373378	-69.878587	-894061
Sebastopol	-20.383333	-69.916667	-894171
Cóndor	-20.392843	-70.011505	-894064
San Enrique	-20.407103	-69.84198	-894149
Viga	-20.414768	-69.893692	-894187
Sacramento	-20.416667	-69.833333	-894142
San Pedro	-20.416667	-69.9	-894157
San Antonio	-20.416667	-69.9	-900125
Adriático	-20.4	-69.933333	-894020
San Enrique	-20.4	-69.866667	-900257
Victoria	-20.433333	-69.05	-894185
Argentina	-20.435847	-69.864649	-872551
Pirineo	-20.449232	-70.031223	-894126
Santa Elena	-20.45	-69.783333	-894161
Providencia	-20.453338	-69.993508	-894133
San Pablo	-20.457292	-69.848845	-894155
Ponte Vedra	-20.460112	-69.902208	-894128
Diana	-20.466667	-69.766667	-894070
Santa Ana	-20.47645	-69.905884	-894159
Gloria Victoria	-20.477913	-69.953576	-894084
Coruña	-20.483333	-69.883333	-894067
Resurrección	-20.483333	-70	-894137
San Lorenzo	-20.483333	-69.966667	-894152
Virginia	-20.483333	-69.8	-894188
Felisa	-20.5	-69.9	-894080
San Remigio	-20.5	-69.9	-894158
Santa Lucía	-20.525699	-69.959426	-894164
Anita Pintados	-20.548496	-69.750143	-894030
Mosquitos	-20.554971	-69.722058	-893068
Gloria	-20.574362	-69.993051	-894083
Mena Vilana	-20.596196	-69.702188	-894112
Aurrera	-20.642482	-69.630034	-894038
Pan de Azúcar	-20.694895	-69.734185	-894117
Diez de Septiembre	-20.696103	-69.701583	-894071
Victoria	-20.716667	-69.683333	-894186
Brac	-20.733333	-69.7	-904339
Victoria	-20.733333	-69.7	-904339
Victoria	-20.740547	-69.659977	-894183
Alianza	-20.766667	-69.7	-871794
Pozo Granja	-20.819409	-69.540906	-897214
Bellavista	-20.82276	-69.720449	-894043
Buenaventura	-20.835575	-69.717824	-874162
Slavonia	-20.85	-69.733333	-894078
La Granja	-20.902554	-69.619369	-886390
Iris	-20.911023	-69.632315	-894088
Lagunas Norte	-20.968118	-69.67982	-893853
Lagunas	-20.982377	-69.672023	-876096
Lagunas Sur	-20.999419	-69.666116	-886469
Andrés	-21.858587	-69.563535	-894146
Santa Fé	-21.86256	-69.565618	-894162
Joya	-21.885144	-69.434945	-894091
Iberia	-21.942359	-69.594399	-894087
Grutas	-21.966667	-69.616667	-894086
Prosperidad	-21.975523	-69.607833	-894132
Rica Aventura	-21.985481	-69.60945	-894138
Esperanza Nitrate Company	-22.016667	-69.633333	-874154
Buena Esperanza	-22.022513	-69.626972	-894046
Empresa	-22.038651	-69.621618	-894075
Peregrinos	-22.066667	-69.6	-894122
Toco	-22.070638	-69.613741	-894176
Santa Isabel	-22.083333	-69.6	-894163
Santa Ana	-22.116667	-69.583333	-894160
María Elena	-22.344486	-69.661775	-894107
Coya (later María Elena)	-22.416667	-69.633333	-894069
Vergara	-22.466667	-69.633333	-894182
Pedro de Valdivia	-22.597292	-69.667393	-894119
Los Dones	-22.71236	-69.775475	-890182
Lina	-22.823529	-69.312331	-894100
Higinio Astoreca	-22.872456	-69.818544	-894025
Aconcagua	-22.950104	-69.372866	-871203
Angamos	-22.977802	-69.463233	-894028
Concepción	-22.983333	-69.383333	-894063
Curicó	-22.989206	-69.391872	-878180
Filomena	-23.007874	-69.408899	-894081
Maria	-23.033501	-69.456395	-894106
María	-23.034766	-69.455049	-894105
Luisis	-23.038865	-69.518268	-894103
Perseverancia	-23.049155	-69.397168	-894123
Cecilia	-23.05	-69.516667	-875984
Anita Antofagasta	-23.059285	-69.499304	-894031
Ausonia	-23.068968	-69.542286	-894039
Araucana	-23.085246	-69.450338	-894033
Pinto	-23.086443	-69.510422	-894125
Arturo Prat	-23.100142	-69.505954	-894034
Carmela	-23.104632	-69.564754	-894052
Edwards	-23.120286	-69.544241	-894074
Ossa	-23.130208	-69.584115	-894114
Ercilla	-23.134143	-69.875888	-894077
Chacabuco	-23.146229	-69.617448	-876218
Celia	-23.148974	-69.667476	-894059
Aurelia	-23.15	-69.616667	-894036
Carlos Condell	-23.157893	-69.679395	-894051
Lastenia	-23.166667	-69.6	-894093
Puelma	-23.184007	-69.662477	-894134
Sargento Aldea	-23.200132	-69.686464	-894169
Blanca Encalada	-23.210429	-69.618437	-894044
Lautaro	-23.519651	-69.343335	-894096
San Antonio	-23.519651	-69.343335	-894096
Domeyko	-23.783333	-69.35	-894072
Savona	-23.785888	-69.406553	-894170
Pissis	-23.8	-69.366667	-894127
Cochrane	-23.823816	-69.288788	-894062
Castilla	-23.899985	-69.838636	-894056
Americana	-23.953655	-69.772849	-894027
Pampa Rica	-24.050691	-69.9351	-894116
Oriente	-24.055048	-69.790865	-894113
Yugoslavia	-24.056345	-69.829087	-894190
Pepita	-24.076474	-69.865386	-894068
Eugenia	-24.133333	-69.9	-882460
Avanzada	-24.137808	-69.743245	-894040
Petronila	-24.15	-69.85	-896003
Esmeralda	-24.156086	-69.885505	-894079
Eugenia	-24.175166	-69.869258	-887038
Santiago	-24.179758	-69.917254	-894167
María Teresa	-24.20824	-69.855852	-894108
Renacimiento	-24.224715	-69.803595	-894136
San Gregorio	-24.224715	-69.803595	-894136
Bonasort	-24.226065	-69.894478	-894045
San Martín	-24.264648	-69.826443	-894154
Valparaíso	-24.264648	-69.826443	-894154
Rosario	-24.313322	-69.970278	-894140
Dominador	-24.366667	-69.516667	-894073
Salinitas	-25.04149	-69.946783	-894144
José Antonio Moreno	-25.058774	-69.880203	-894111
Sud America	-25.119174	-69.661046	-894175
Chile	-25.15	-69.9	-876923
Alemania	-25.155954	-69.907162	-894024
Atacama	-25.201029	-69.842443	-872737
Caupolicán	-25.2	-69.716667	-894058
Santa Luisa	-25.232142	-70.134263	-882494
Rosario	-25.240858	-69.789199	-894139
Portezuelo	-25.295212	-70.097356	-897026
Ballena	-25.305827	-69.684102	-894041
Flor de Chile	-25.316667	-69.8	-894082
Lilita	-25.323511	-69.66812	-894097
Esperanza	-25.333333	-69.733333	-882317
Unión	-25.340371	-69.79449	-894180
Tricolor	-25.356213	-69.886314	-894177
Los Amigos	-25.443238	-69.929322	-894101
Miraflores	-25.444734	-69.822048	-894110
República	-25.467907	-69.801817	-894173
Severín	-25.467907	-69.801817	-894173
Catalina del Sur	-25.494402	-69.783583	-894057

Some of the works can be found in the maps

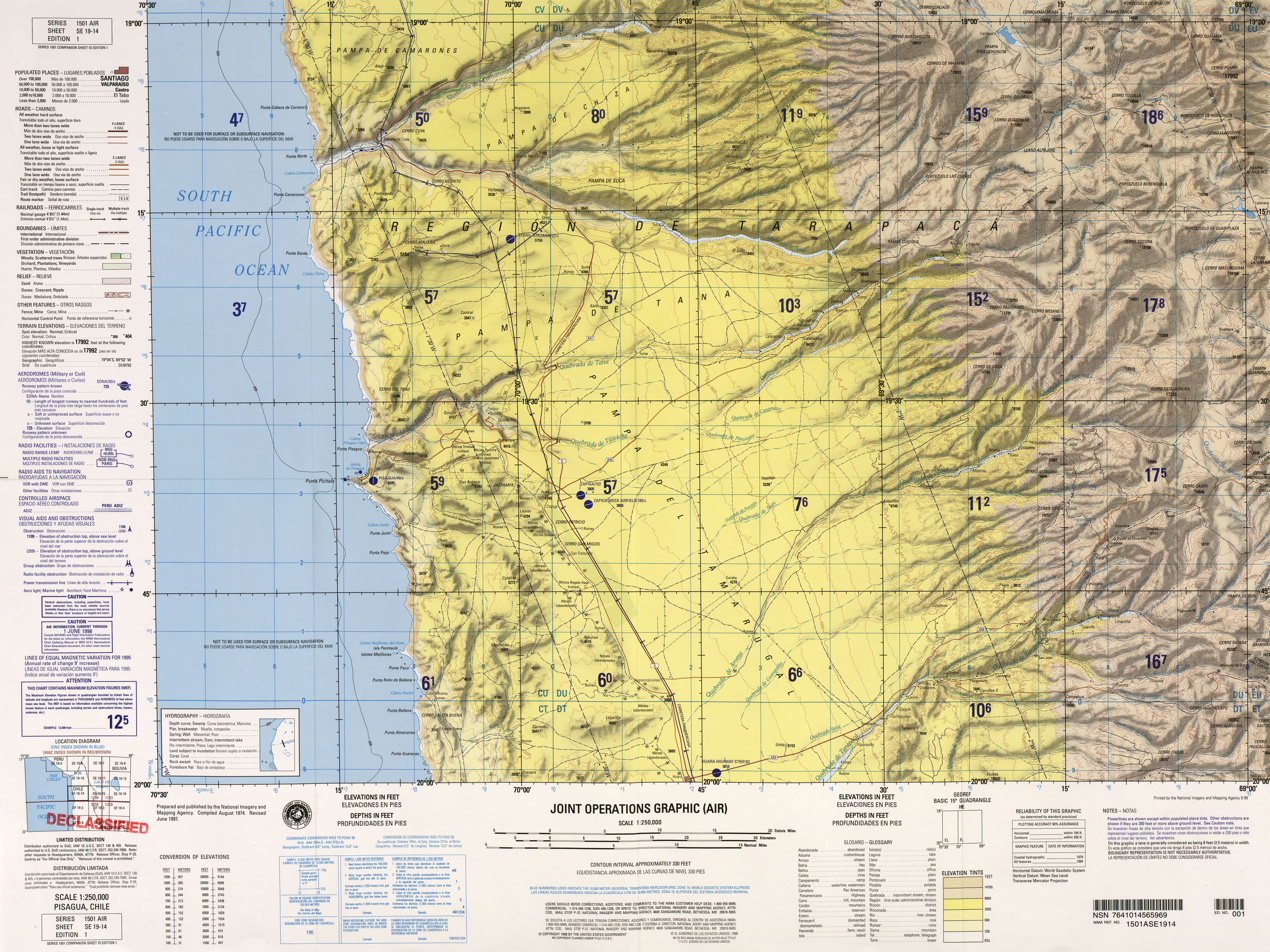
19°S-20°S: Pisagua, Quebrada de Camarones, Caleta Junin, Of. Jazpampa, Of. Vieja

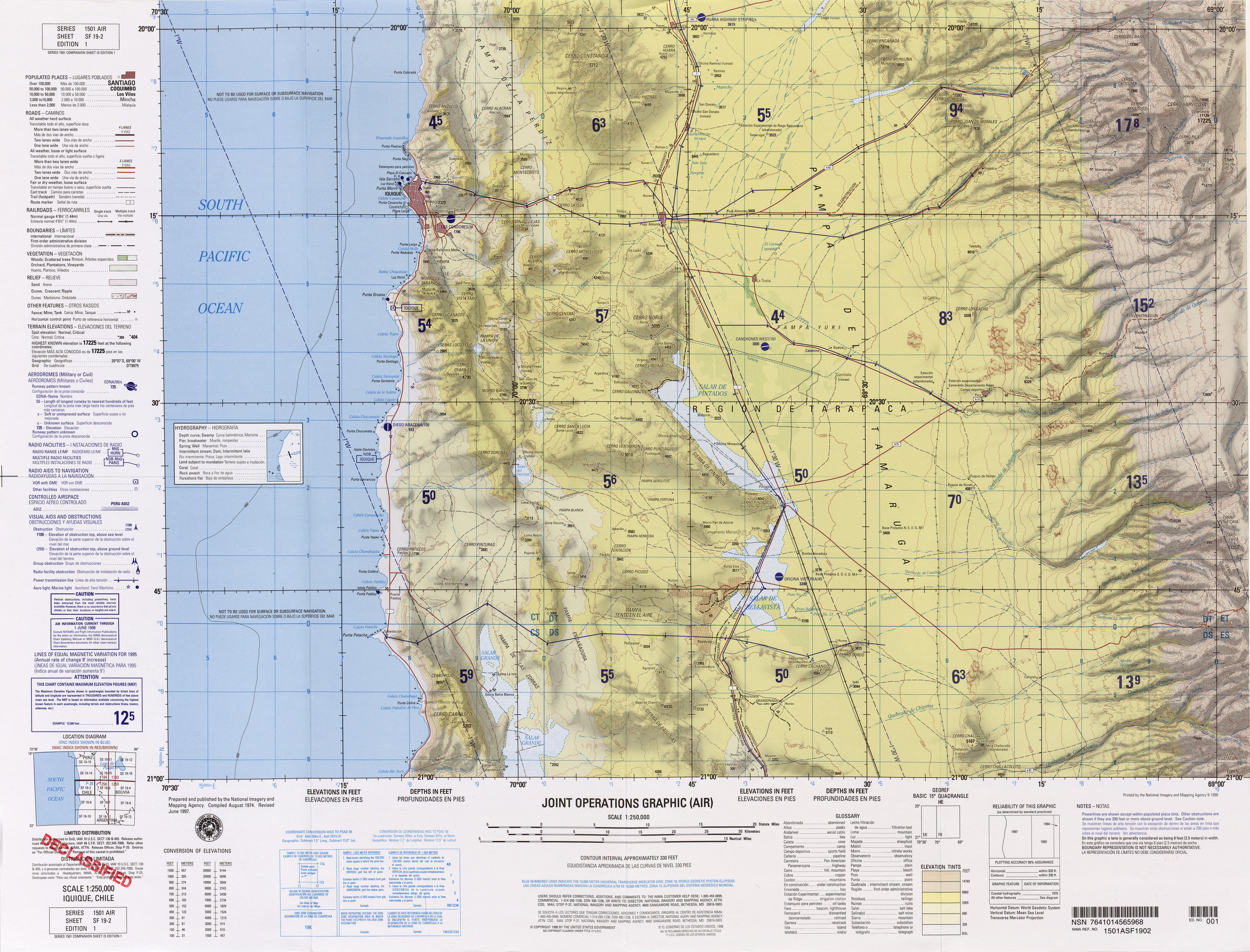
20°S-21°S: Iquique, Huara, Pozo Almonte)

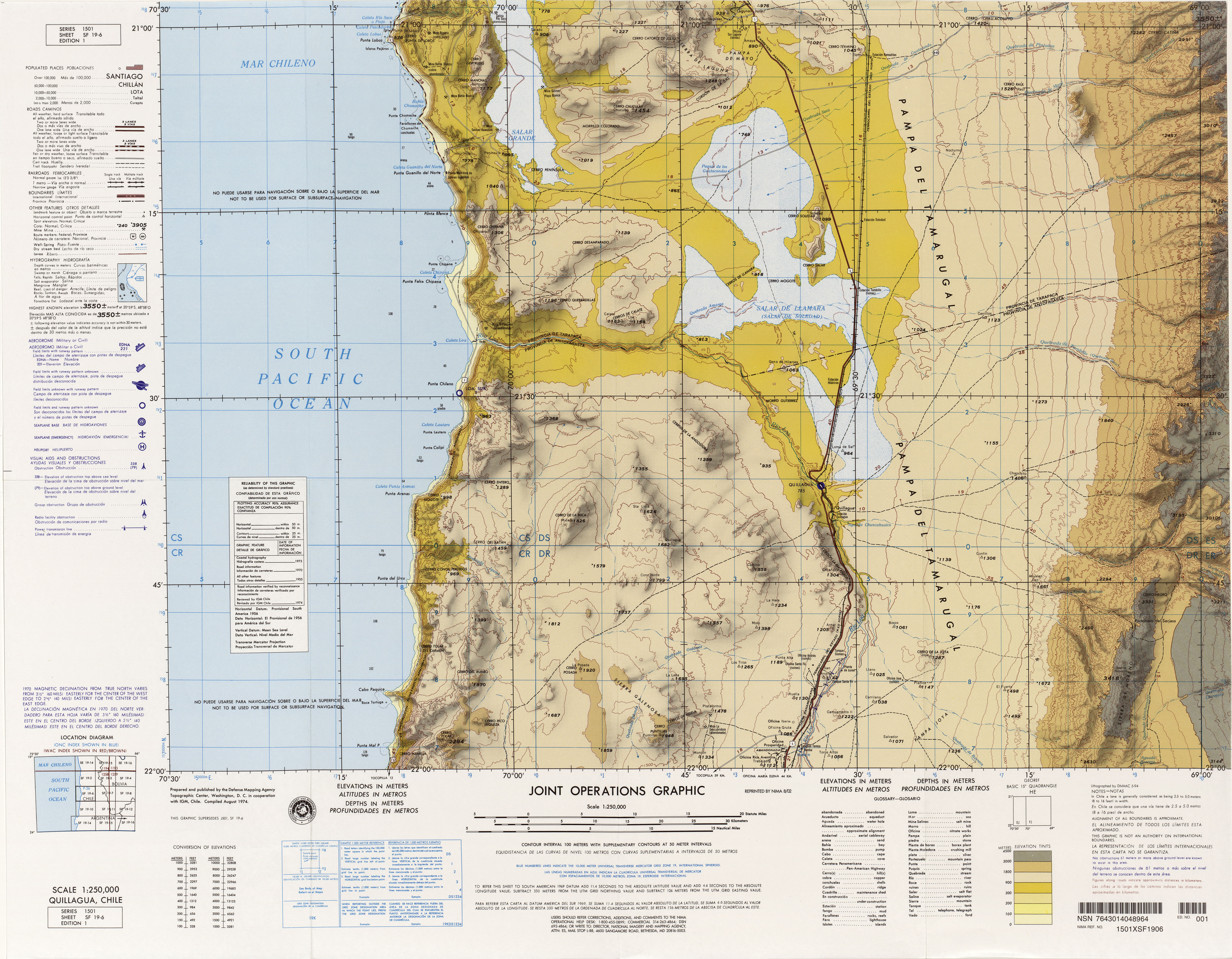
21°S-22°S: Río Loa, Quillagua

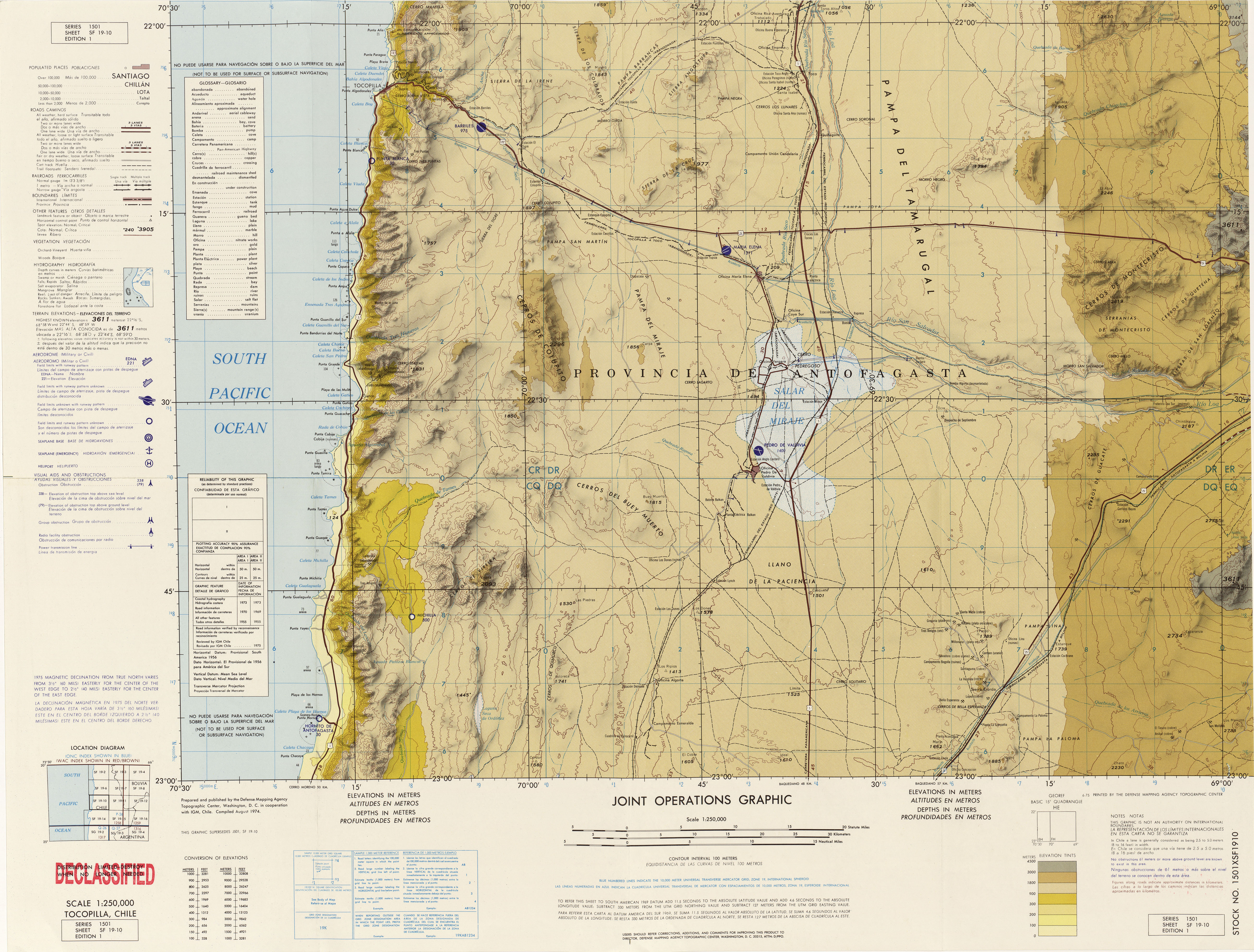
22°S-23°S: Tocopilla, Punta Hornos, Of. María Elena, Río Loa

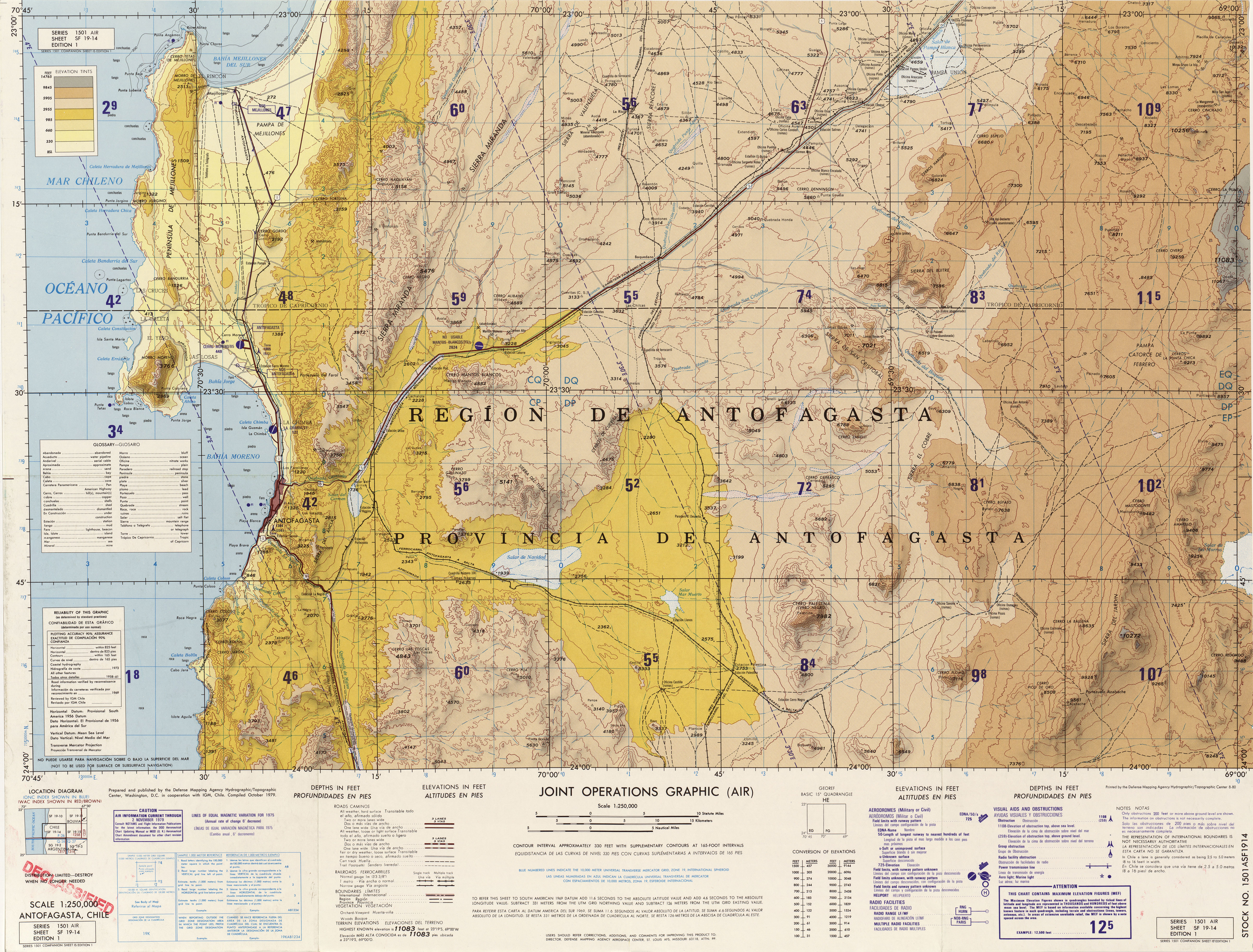
23°S-24°S: Antofagasta Costa

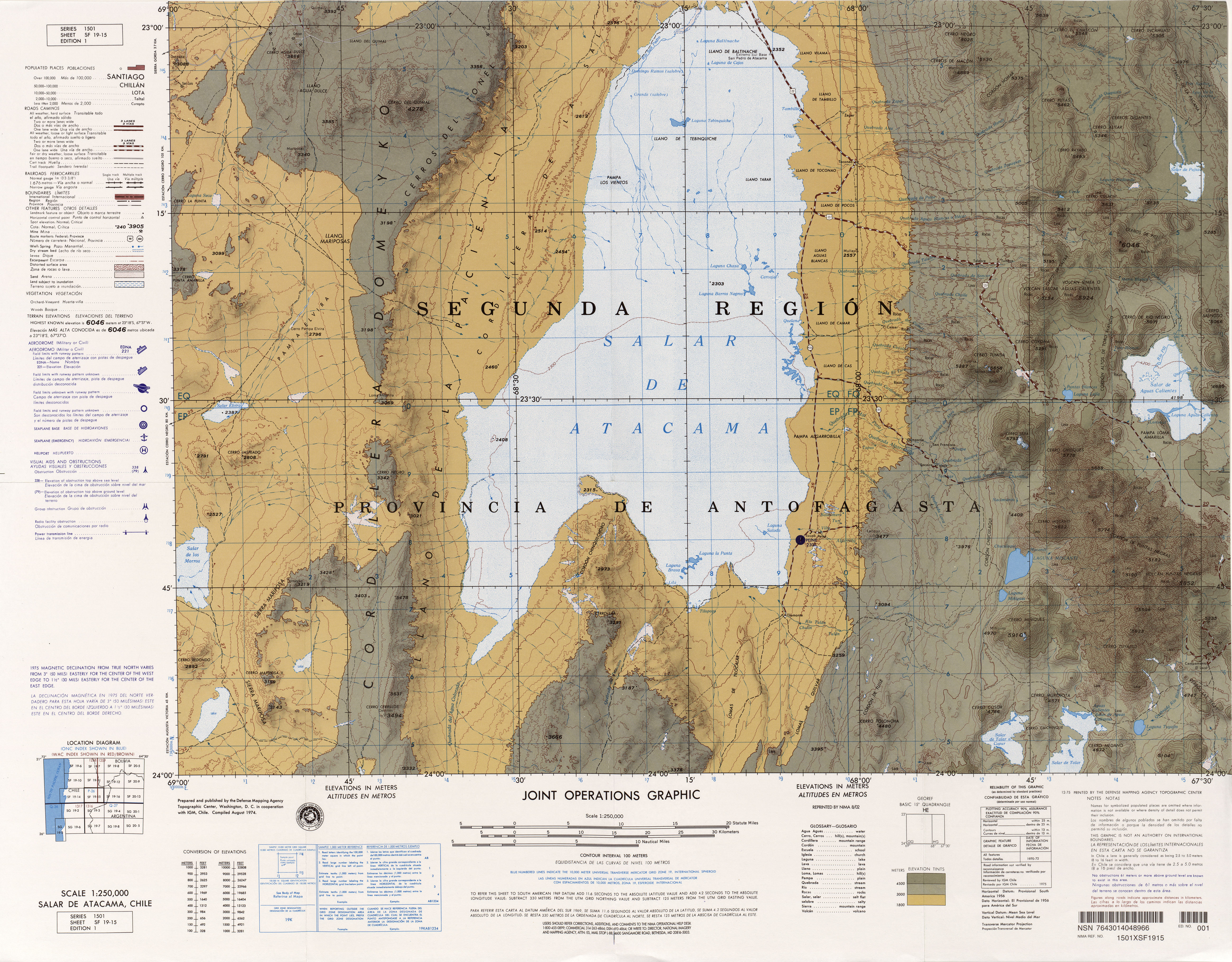
23°S-24°S: Antofagasta interior, Toconao, Peine, Tilomonte, Salar de Atacama (sf19-15)

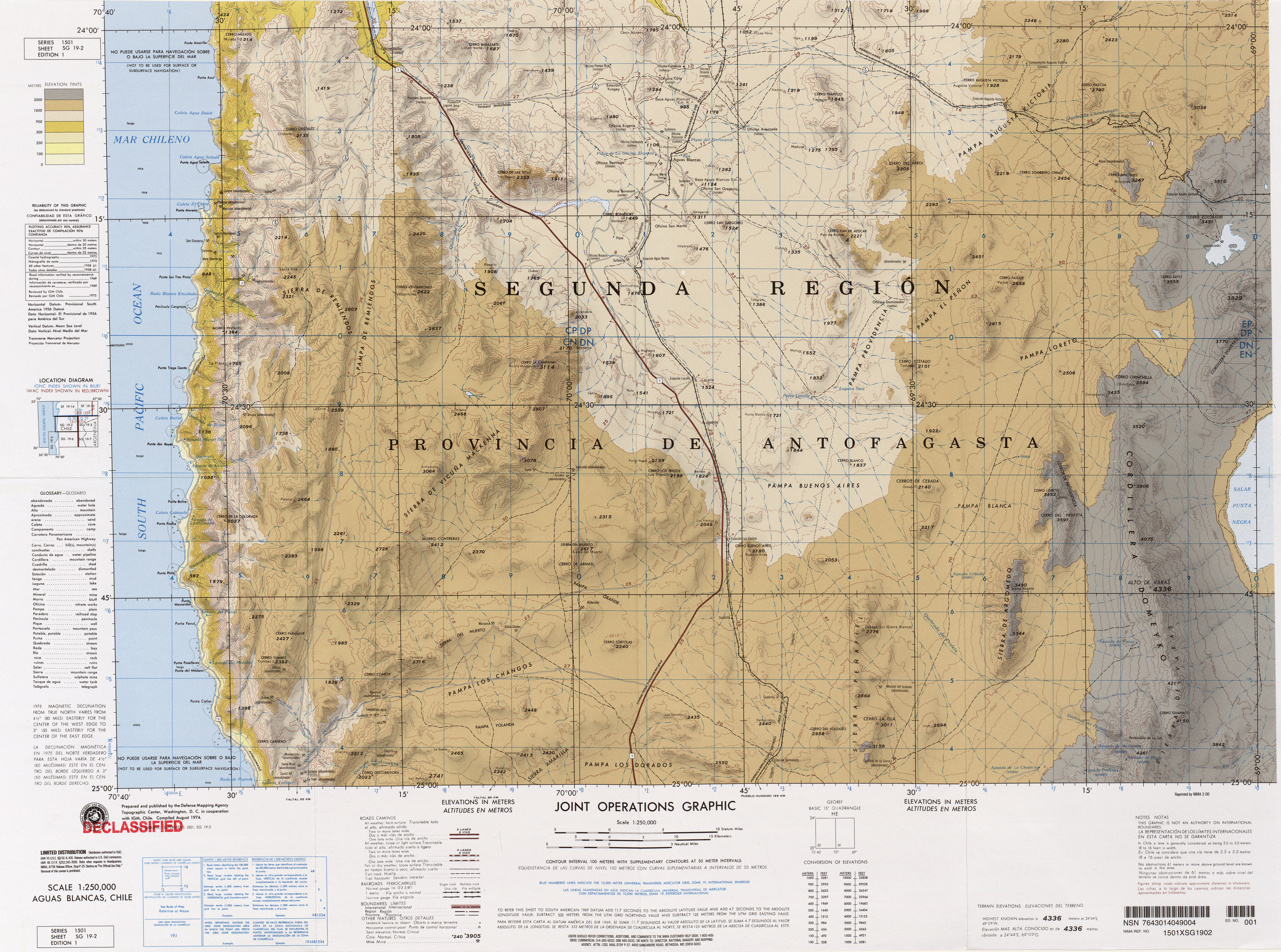
24°S-25°S: Punta Amarilla hasta Rada de Paposo

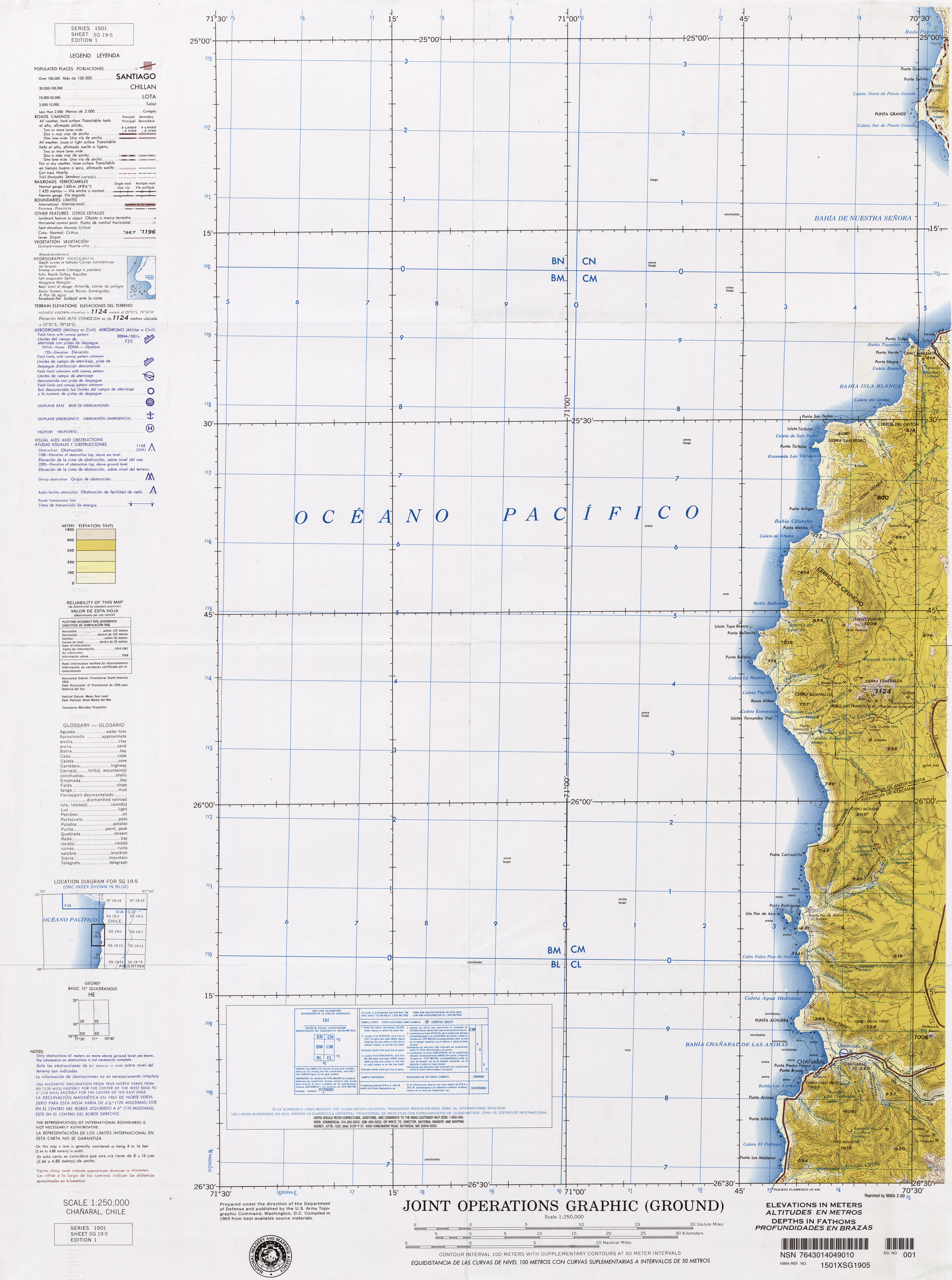
25°S-26°S: Taltal, Chañaral, Parque Nacional Pan de Azúcar (sg19-05)

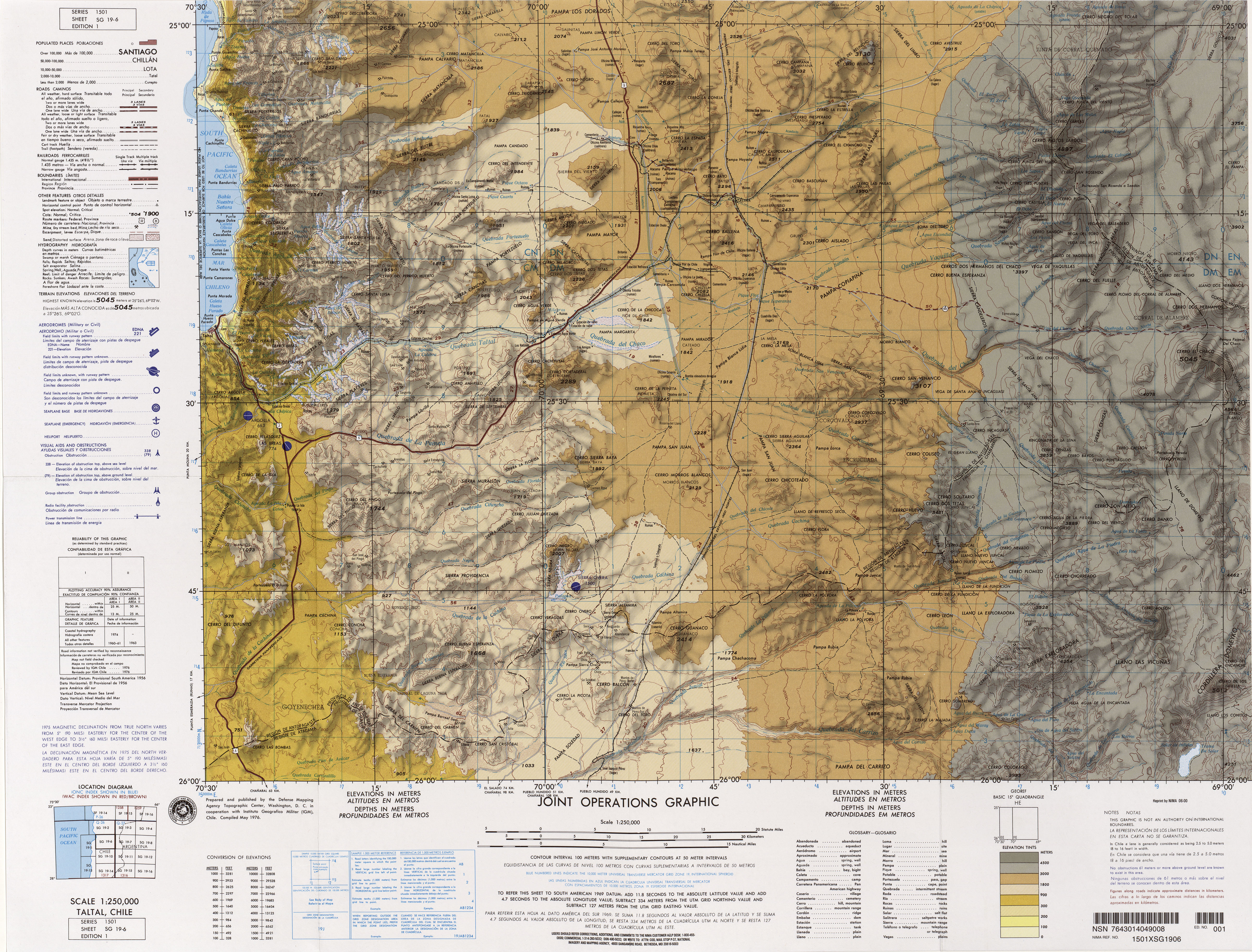
25°S-26°S: Taltal, Oficina Chile

== See also ==
- Pedro Gamboni
- Media related to Category:History of saltpeter works at Wikimedia Commons
- Media related to Category:Saltpeter works of Chile at Wikimedia Commons
