= James Thomas Humberstone =

English chemical engineer

James Thomas Humberstone (8 July 1850 – 12 June 1939) was an English chemical engineer. In 1872, he founded the Peru Nitrate Company to extract saltpetre in the Tarapacá Province of Peru (now part of the Tarapacá Region of Chile). He introduced the Shanks System and other innovations to the industry.

The mining town of Humberstone now forms part of the Humberstone and Santa Laura Saltpeter Works, now abandoned, they were declared a UNESCO World Heritage Site in 2005.

== Life ==
Humberstone was born in Dover, England. His maternal grandfather, Edward S. G. Hopkins (1778–1859), had been director of the band of the Scots Guards. His father Decimus worked as a post office mail guard.

His family moved to London when he was young. Humberstone worked for the London and North Western Railway when he was 17. Later, he joined the Royal School of Mines in London.

When he was 25, he was hired by The Tarapaca Nitrate Company and moved to South America. Humberstone arrived at the Peruvian port of Pisagua on 6 January 1875, where he commenced working as a chemist and engineer.

In 1878 he implemented the Shanks system to make sodium carbonate. He also made other changes such as the transfer of waste water to avoid losing the materials in the rock.

In 1879, as part of the War of the Pacific, the Chilean army landed in Pisagua, and consequently, many office workers went to the Pampa for safety. Humberstone, his wife, his mother and his two daughters went with them. When they got to Tarapaca, the governor said they should go to Arica because the Chilean military was approaching. They crossed the desert because they did not want to be near the coast. It took them twenty days to get to Arica. When the war ended, and Tarapaca became part of Chile, Humberstone returned to his mining business.

In 1936, he became a member of the Order of the British Empire in Edward VIII's Birthday Honours. Humberstone died in Iquique on 12 June 1939 and is buried in the British Cemetery, Tiliviche, Chile.
