= Principales =

Principales may refer to:

- In Philippine history, members of the Principalía
- An aristocrat or nobleman in the Philippines during the Spanish colonial era.
- In Roman history, certain military officers, see Auxilia#Junior officers (principales)
