= Lin Wang (composer) =

Chinese composer and vocalist ((born 1976)

Lin Wang (Chinese: 王琳; pinyin: Wáng Lín (original name), also called Chinese: 王滢乔; pinyin: Wáng Yíng Qíao), is a Chinese composer. Lin Wang was born in Dalian, China, in 1976.

== Biography ==
Lin Wang studied music composition at Central Conservatory of Music in Beijing (1996–2001). Later she studied composition and music theory at Hochschule für Musik Saar with Theo Brandmüller, and electronic music at IRCAM at the Centre Pompidou in France. She also studied theatrical philosophy in music theater at University of Music and Performing Arts Vienna, under Chaya Czernowin.

In 2008, her impromptu chamber composition JI LI GU LU was premiered at the 10th Munich Biennale. It was selected for performance again in the same year at the Venice Biennale and the Bregenzer Festspiele. In 2010, her opera Die Quelle (The Source) was premiered at the 11th Munich Biennale. Lin Wang and Can Xue co-wrote the libretto. In this opera, drying and bubbling-up of the spring symbolize loss and regain of one's own identity. Chinese instruments Sheng, Guzheng and Sanxian were used in its music. An unusual feature is combination of English pronunciation and Chinese intonation in this opera. Her third opera Oh, wie schön ist Panama! (Oh, the Beautiful Panama!) is based on an illustrated children book The Trip to Panama by Janosch. It premiered at Deutsche Oper Berlin in 2013.

== Awards ==
Lin Wang has won several international music composition competitions:

- First prize, Musica Femina München Komponistinnen entdecken und fördern, Germany (2009).
- First prize, the first edition of "Franco Donatoni" International Meeting for Young Composers Composition Competition, International Society for Contemporary Music (ISCM), Italy (2008).
- Grand prize, Isang Yun International Composition Prize, South Korea (2007).
- First prize, the first session of International Hamburg Klangwerktage New Music Festival and Composition Competition, Germany (2006).
- First prize, European Young Composers Competition in Hochschule für Musik Franz Liszt Weimar, Germany (2005).
- Special prize and the second prize, the Luxembourg Sinfonietta on the Third Luxembourg International Composition Prize, Luxembourg (2004).

== Selected works ==
Premiere	Title	Description	Source, libretto and note
1 February 2003, "China-USA" Landschaftsfotografien von Wolfgang Volz	Ru Yi Si Zhu	Trio for oboe, clarinet, and basson, 11'40"	
30 May 2003, Ensemble Musikfabrik, concluding concert of the composition competition of the State Music Academy NRW Mönchengladbach	Dong Xiang Xie Yi (A Sketch of the Dong Nation's Country)	Chamber orchestra for 15 instruments, 11'40"	
8 May 2004 Luxembourg Sinfonietta	Lin Lang (A Fine Jade)	Chamber ensemble, 13'42"	
2004	Zwei Kraniche unter einer Kiefer (Two Cranes under a Pine Tree)	Piano solo, 11'04"	
6 September 2005, Nieuw Ensemble at Gaudeamus Muziekweek festival, Gaudeamus Foundation	Ba Yin (Eight Sounds)	Chamber ensemble for eight instruments, voice and conductor	
2005 Ensemble Modern and Gesellschaft für Neue Musik	Jawohl "Herr Präsident!" I am here!!!	Music theater, 13'	after a poem by E. E. Cummings
15 November 2006, International Hamburg Klangwerktage New Music Festival and Composition Competition, Germany	Who Desires the Secret	Quartet	
17 February 2007, IMPULS, International Ensemble and Composers Academy for Contemporary Music. Competition. Festival. Events.	Das Rätsel der Begierde (The Enigma of Desire)	Quartet, 9'30"	inspired by Salvador Dalí's painting My Mother, My Mother, My Mother
15 September 2007, Korean Contemporary Orchestra on the first session of International Isang Yun Music Prize Composition Competition	La...de la mémoire	Chamber orchestra	inspired by Salvidor Dalí's painting My Mother, My Mother, My Mother
2008 Munich Biennale	JI LI GU LU	Chamber ensemble, 9'09"	impromptu piece
1 May 2008, Divertimento Ensemble by the first edition of "Franco Donatoni" International Meeting for Young Composers Composition Competition	A Secret That Is Wanted	Chamber ensemble	
16 June 2008, ensemble counter)induction, New York	DI LI BA LA	Chamber ensemble	
9 May 2010, Munich Biennale	Die Quelle (The Source)	Chamber opera, 85'	libretto by the composer and Can Xue, after a short story "The Double Life" by Can Xue
10 February 2011, Musica Femina Munich and Munich Chamber Orchestra	Jade	Chamber ensemble	
5 March 2012, Deutsche Radio Philharmonie Saarbrücken Kaiserslautern	...To Be Sung in the Wood...	Double concerto for symphony orchestra, sheng and guzheng, 23'	after Epithalamion (Wedding Song) written by the English poet Edmund Spenser
26 January 2013, Deutsche Oper Berlin	Oh, wie schön ist Panama (Oh! How beautiful is Panama)	Opera/music theater, 55'	libretto by Dorothea Hartmann, after an illustrated children's story by Janosch
31 March 2017, Deutsche Radio Philharmonie Saarbrücken Kaiserslautern	Gene and Astrology Series No. 6 – Aquarius-Hulan River (2015)	for female voice and large orchestra, 21'	conducted by Josep Pon
