= National Railway Museum (Peru) =

Museum in Peru

Coordinates: 18.0130°S 70.2546°W

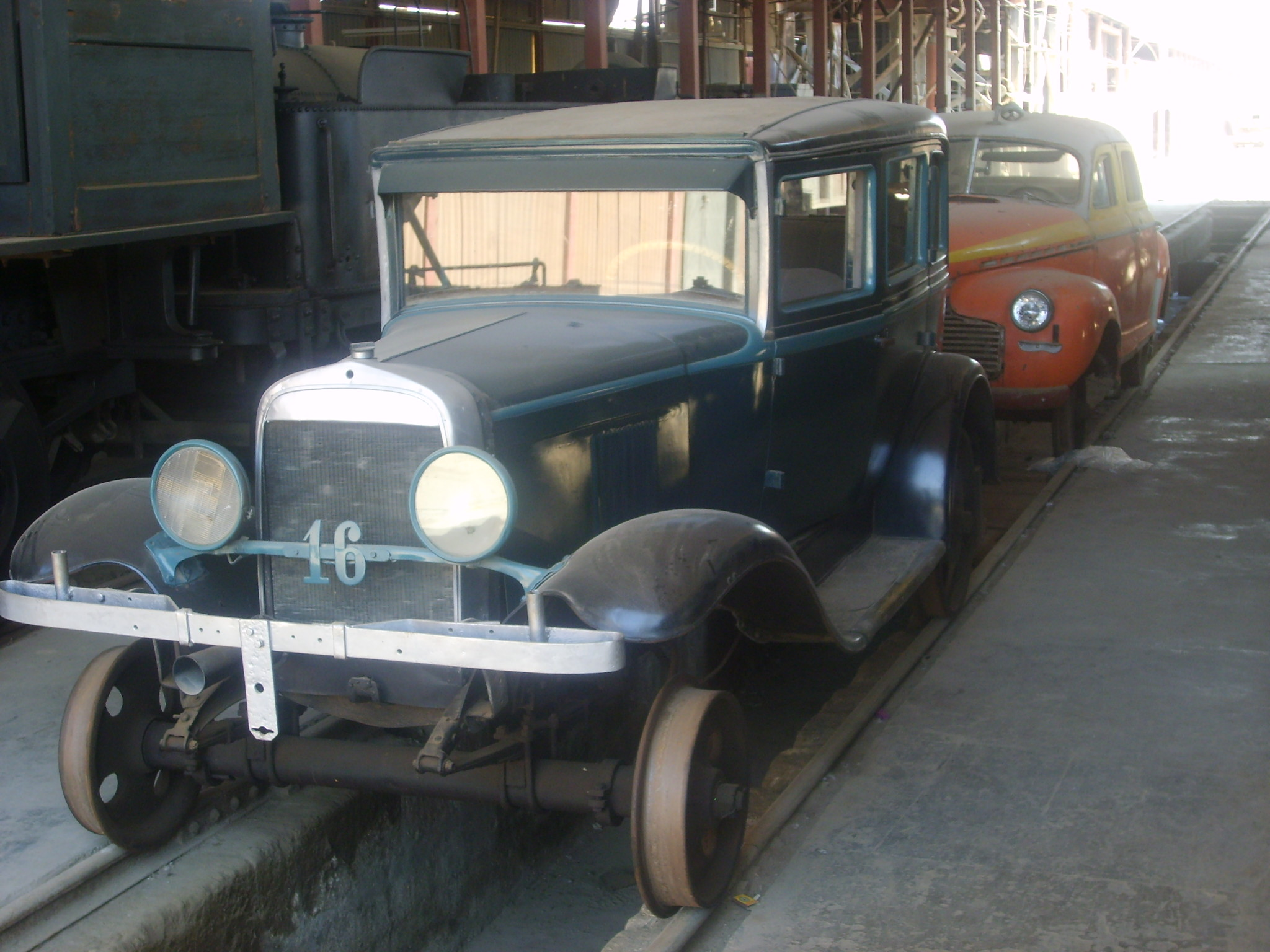
Historical railcars on display in Tacna

The National Railway Museum of Peru is located in Tacna, Peru.

The museum was built at the site of the old Tacna–Arica railway station, which connected the two cities. The museum features many preserved elements used during the second half of the nineteenth century before it was destroyed. The exhibition presents a history of the railway and its functions.

The Museum is located at the Tacna-Arica Railway Station, at Av. Gregorio Albarracín 402, at the intersection with Av. 2 de Mayo, Tacna. The train service began in 1856 and the station was built in 1855 according to a design by Walter Evans. It was declared a Historic Monument in 1980. The arch with bell tower is very characteristic. The old station is still largely preserved in its original state with many elements from the second half of the 19th century, when it was built. The exhibition gives the visitor an insight into the historical course of the railway.

The Tacna-Arica Railway closed in 2012, but as of June 2014, there were plans to reopen it.

Since 27 May 2016, a railbus has again been running on the Tacna-Arica Railway. However, the museum has been under reconstruction since 2018. A sign informed: "Due to reconstruction, the entrance to the museum is closed until further notice. The administration." The current status is not known.

== Collection ==
The museum has 3 rooms: Historical Documentation, Peru and Tacna-Arica. In addition, the museum's collection includes documents, photographs, parts and locomotives of the Tacna-Arica Railway. On the tracks and in the locomotive sheds there are four steam locomotives from Baldwin and Alco, as well as three wooden passenger cars, bogies, railcars and freight cars.
