= Patrick Harrex =

British composer

- Born: 1946 (age 79–80); London, England
- Origin: Brighton, England
- Genres: Contemporary classical music
- Occupation: Composer
- Labels: Decca, Argo

Patrick Harrex (born 1946, in London) is a British contemporary classical music composer based in Brighton.

Harrex studied Music & Education at York University and won first prize in the 1968 BBC Composers’ Competition. His Sonata for female voice, flute and percussion, published by Schott was written in 1966 and in 1968 he was commissioned by the Decca Record Company to write a work for children (Narnian Suite) for ‘Voices’, recorded on the Argo label.

Early success came when "Antiphonies", written for the Portia Ensemble, was premiered at the Purcell Room in November 1967, with the composer conducting. In 1968 he was featured in BBC Radio 3’s ‘Youth at the Helm’.

Whilst at York he was also a founder member of Gentle Fire, which became one of the leading groups performing experimental and live electronic music.

Harrex was awarded a French Government Scholarship, which enabled him to spend a year in Paris after graduating from York in 1968; here he attended Olivier Messiaen’s composition class at the Conservatoire and studied privately with Gilbert Amy. Prior to this, during the summer of 1967, he had attended a brief course in composition given by the Belgian composer Henri Pousseur.

Harrex has twice been a shortlisted composer with SPNM (The Society for the Promotion of New Music) and in 2003 won second prize in the Luxembourg International Composition Prize with Hauptweg und Nebenwege.

His works are performed widely, live and on radio, and commercially recorded not only in the UK but also in continental Europe, the United States, Canada and Australia.

Harrex is also involved in encouraging interest in new music by young people and amateur musicians – he currently holds positions as Composer in Residence at two schools in Sussex, and in 2005 he established the Sussex branch of CoMA (Contemporary Music for Amateurs). He was a founder member and is a past chairman of New Music Brighton , a collective of composers living or working in the Sussex area. He is co-founder, with Claudia Molitor, and Chair of Trustees of Soundwaves Festival.

== Discography ==
- Sonata for female voice, flute and percussion: CBC Radio Canada SM148 (recording of live broadcast; Mary Morrison, soprano, Robert Aitken, flute, John Wyre, percussion)
- Narnian Suite: Argo Record Co. DA91 – performed by children from Heslington Primary School and students of the University of York, conducted by the composer.
- Sampler: New Music Brighton NMBCD001 – on ‘new piano music from a Sussex shore’ performed by Stephanie Cant
- Hauptweg und Nebenwege: Editions LGNM No 403, recording of a live performance by the Luxembourg Sinfonietta conducted by Marcel Wengler.
