= Chañaral Ortega-Miranda =

Chilean composer of classical music (born 1973)

Chañaral Ortega-Miranda (born 1973) is a Chilean composer of classical music.

Born in Arica, Chile, in 1973, Ortega-Miranda was exiled in France for the first six years of his life. After studying musical theory and composition in Buenos Aires from 1989 to 1993, he attended Sergio Ortega's composition classes at the École Normale de Musique de Paris until 2000. He then attended the Conservatoire de Strasbourg where he studied with Ivan Fedele. He participated in the annual Musiques à l'encre fraîche festivals from 1993 to 2000. He has also worked with Jonathan Harvey, Michael Jarrell, Zoltán Jeney and Péter Eötvös at the Acanthes Centre and participated in the composition session at the Fondation Royaumont: Voix Nouvelles with Brian Ferneyhough and Stefano Gervasoni. Ortega-Miranda is a cofounder of the Association Syntono, Boulogne-Billancourt, which supports the composition and promotion of contemporary music. Q'inti, his award-winning composition for orchestral ensemble, is inspired by an Inca legend.

== Works ==
- Q'inti, orchestral ensemble (2004)
- Oba 'loube oba 'ye, guitar and live electronics (2002)
- Kelleñutún, cello solo (2001)
- Tzinin-oc, soprano, mezzo=soprano, tenor, baritone et string quartet (2001)
- A la sombra del Longino, orchestral ensemble (2001)
- Un Nocturno por Chacabuco orchestral ensemble (2000)
- Quintet, flute, clarinet, violin, cello and piano (1999)
- L'extraordinaire aventure arrivée à Vladimir Maïakovski en été, à la campagne, baritone and wind quintet (1998)
- Trio for violin, cello and piano (1998)

== Awards ==
- First Prize, International Composition Competition, Luxembourg, 2004 for Q'inti

== Discography ==
- International Composition Prize 2004, World Premiere Recordings: Chañaral Ortega-Miranda, Q'inti; Lin Wang, Lin Lang; Satoru Ikeda, Fireworks; Matteo Franceschini, Làbara; Jonathan Eato, Bling Bling Balaam. Luxembourg Sinfonietta, conductor: Marcel Wengler. CD LGNM No 404.
