= Dietmar Bär =

German actor

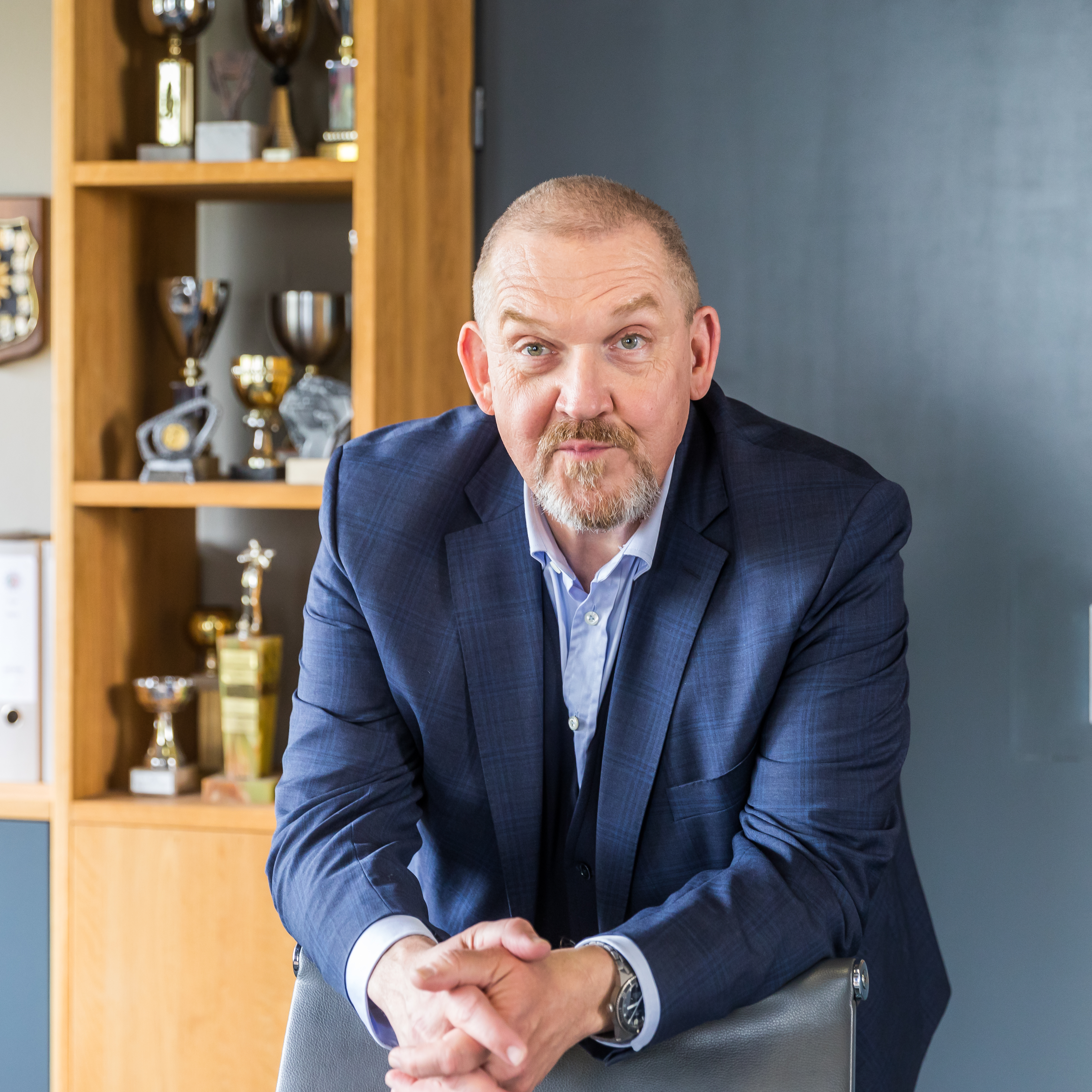
- Bär in 2023
- Born: 5 February 1961 (age 65); Dortmund, West Germany
- Occupation: Actor
- Years active: 2003–present
- Spouse: Maren Geissler (m. 2009)

Dietmar Bär (born 5 February 1961) is a German actor. Since 1997 he has starred as Freddy Schenk in the popular television crime series Tatort and in Ärzte (a TV series in 1994). He has been in several films, including Männer by Doris Dörrie. He is a narrator of many audiobooks translated into German.

== Early life ==
In 1981, Bär graduated from the Dortmund Leibniz-Gymnasium. During his schooling, he became a member of the Sozialistische Deutsche Arbeiterjugend (SDAJ). He was noticed for his acting talent in various school theater projects. Later, he became a singer of a Dortmund-based punk band, Planlos, through the 80s. He then trained as an actor from 1982 to 1985 at the Westfälische Schauspielschule Bochum. One of his first acting roles was in 1984, as a football club hooligan for MSV Duisburg in the crime series Tatort (episode Two kinds of blood).

== Career ==
Bär received his first lead role in 1984, appearing Dominik Graf's hit (TV movie) Treffer as Franz. Then in 1985, he played a minor role 'Lothar' in Men... (German: Männer) directed by Doris Dörrie. Also in 1985, followed by an acting commitment with the Landestheater Tübingen. From 1988 to 1990 and from 1992 to 1994 he appeared in the Wuppertal theatres. Alongside veteran actor Willy Millowitsch, he played Mike Döpper in the detective series Kommissar Klefisch between 1990 and 1996. Also between 1994 and 1996, he had another well-known role as the sports physician Conny Knipper in Ärzte (TV series). Bär is best known as Tatort Inspector Freddy Schenk, whom he has been playing since 1997 alongside Max Ballauf, played by Klaus J. Behrendt.

At the Gandersheim Cathedral Festival in the summer of 2007 and 2008, Bär played the village judge Adam in Kleist's comedy play The Broken Jug. Since 2010, he has performed at the Schauspielhaus Bochum, in the play Eisenstein as Vincent Hufnagel (old) and Lothar.

Bär also has narrated many audiobooks into German for various authors, including Mo Hayder, Håkan Nesser, Jacques Berndorf, Thomas Krugerand and Stieg Larsson.

== Personal life ==
Together with the Berlin association pro futura, Bär supports the future prospects of young people and the long-term unemployed. In addition, he founded with fellow Tatort actors Roads of the World e. V. in 1998, which campaigns on behalf of Filipino street children. This was inspired by the much-acclaimed Tatort episode "Manila" filmed in 1998, which dealt with the fate of Filipino street children and child exploitation. For this, he and Klaus J. Behrendt received the KIND Award from Kinderlachen Eingetragener Verein which cares for sick and poor children mainly in Germany. He regularly tours Germany with the Irish Father Shay Cullen, who cares for street children in the Philippines, promoting fair trade as a concept of success against poverty and discrimination of people in the Philippines and elsewhere.

In addition, Bär is committed to the German bone marrow donor database, through poster advertising campaigns. He has also appeared in a campaign for the victims of crime as part of the Weisser Ring.

Bär is also a member of the Bundesverband Schauspiel (Federal Association of Acting, BFFS).

Since 15 April 2009, Bär has been married to Maren Geissler. He is an avowed fan of the football club Borussia Dortmund, a love also shared by his Tatort character Freddy Schenk.

== Selected filmography ==
- 1984: Treffer
- 1985: Feel the Motion
- 1985: Men...
- 1991: Leo und Charlotte (TV film)
- 1996: Wer hat Angst vorm Weihnachtsmann? (Short)
- 1998: The Big Mambo
- 1998: Kai Rabe gegen die Vatikankiller
- 1999: Das Gelbe vom Ei (TV film)
- 1999: From the Depths to the Heights (TV film)
- 2000: Nie mehr zweite Liga (TV film)
- 2002: Pest – Die Rückkehr (TV film)
- 2002: If It Don't Fit, Use a Bigger Hammer
- 2004: Guys and Balls
- 2004: Drechslers zweite Chance (TV film)
- 2006: The Trip to Panama (Voice)
- 2006: Der Untergang der Pamir (TV film)
- 2010: The Crocodiles Strike Back
- 2011: Never Again (TV film)
- 2014: Die Pilgerin (TV film)
- 2015: Big Fish, Small Fish (TV film)
- 2016: Das Sacher (TV film)
