= Leticia Moreno =

Spanish violinist at 1998 Eurovision Young Musicians

Leticia Moreno

Leticia Muñoz Moreno (born 1985 in Madrid) is a Spanish violinist. She began her music education at the early age of three in both violin and piano with the Suzuki Method offering her first recitals when she was just five. In 1996 she studied six years with Zakhar Bron at the Escuela Superior de Música Reina Sofía and in Germany at Köln Musikhochschule. Later on she studied with Maxim Vengerov in Saarbrücken and David Takeno at the Guildhall School of Music and Drama where she received the highest grade ever in the history of the school for her final recital. Her final teacher was Mstislav Rostropovich, who mentored her from 2003 during his final years.

Since 2005 Leticia Moreno has been playing a 1679 Pietro Guarneri violin, which is the property of the Stradivari Society of Chicago. She has played concerts all around the world: Austria, England, St. Petersburg, Moscow, Italy, Poland, South America, Mexico and Spain, and with orchestras including the Chicago Symphony Orchestra and Vienna Symphony Orchestra.

The Spanish composer Francisco Lara has dedicated one composition to her: Capriccio for Leticia (2005).

== Awards ==
- Spanish Interpreters Association, 1996, 1999 and 2000
- Juventudes Musicales of Spain, 1997, 1998 and 2001
- Henryk Szeryng Competition, 2000
- Concertino Praga, 2000
- Novosibirsk, 2001
- Pablo de Sarasate Prize, 2001
- Emily Anderson Prize, 2005
- Lotto-Förderpreis des Rheingau Musik Festivals, 2010
