= Janosch =

German author (1931–2026)

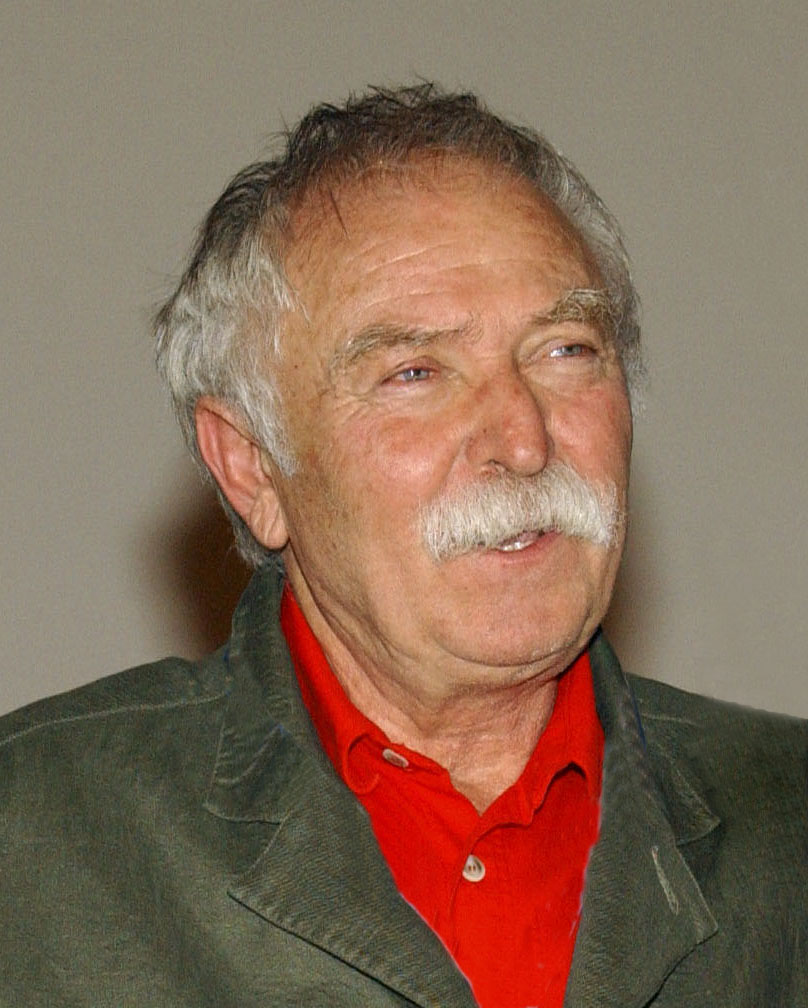
- Janosch in 2002
- Born: Horst Eckert; 11 March 1931; Hindenburg, Upper Silesia, Prussia, Germany
- Died: 3 November 2026 (aged 95); Tenerife, Spain
- Occupations: Writer, illustrator
- Writing career
- Genre: Children's picture books
- Notable work: Janoschs Traumstunde
- Website: www.janosch.de

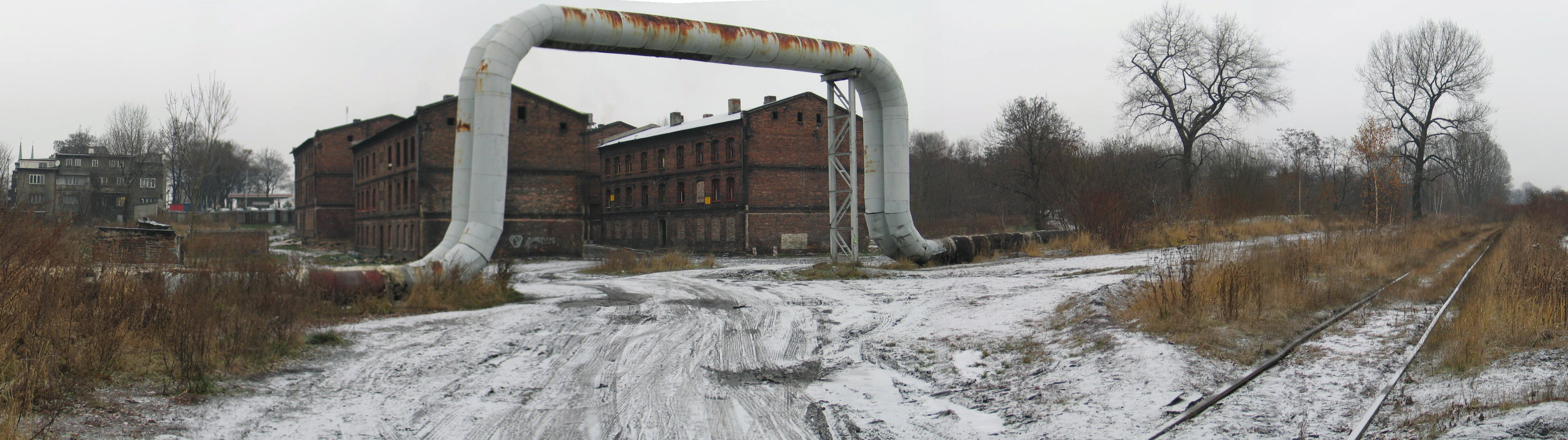
The location in Hindenburg where the house in which Janosch was born used to stand (now demolished)

Horst Eckert (11 March 1931 – 3 November 2026), better known by his pen name Janosch (German: [ˈjaːnɔʃ]), was a German author and illustrator of children's books. He rose to prominence in the 1970s with stories featuring characters such as the Tigerente, a tiger–duck hybrid, which became particularly famous in German-speaking countries. Over the course of his career, he created more than 150 books, which sold millions of copies worldwide and were translated into around 40 languages.

== Life and career ==
Janosch was born on 11 March 1931 in Hindenburg, Province of Upper Silesia (now Zabrze, Poland), to a family of mixed German and Polish origin, though he identified his nationality as Silesian. His mother was a pious Catholic, and his father a violent alcoholic. After World War II, the family fled to West Germany, where Janosch worked in a textile mill near Oldenburg. In 1953, he moved to Munich, where he studied at the Academy of Fine Arts, but left after a few semesters. Afterwards, he worked as a freelance artist. In 1960, his first book for children was published with his friend Georg Lentz, who persuaded him to take on the pen name Janosch.

Janosch's story "Oh, wie schön ist Panama" was adapted into a contemporary opera under the title "Oh, the beautiful Panama" by Lin Wang. The opera premiered at Deutsche Oper Berlin in 2013. The 2006 German film The Trip to Panama is based on Janosch's children's book of the same name.

He published over 150 books in around 40 languages. Amongst his characters is the Tigerente that appears in Oh, wie schön ist Panama and the stories around a little tiger and a little bear. He also published several books for adults, in which he deals with his childhood experiences of growing up with an abusive father and a religious mother. Between 1953 and 1980 he lived in Munich, and later moved to the island of Tenerife, where he lived until his death.

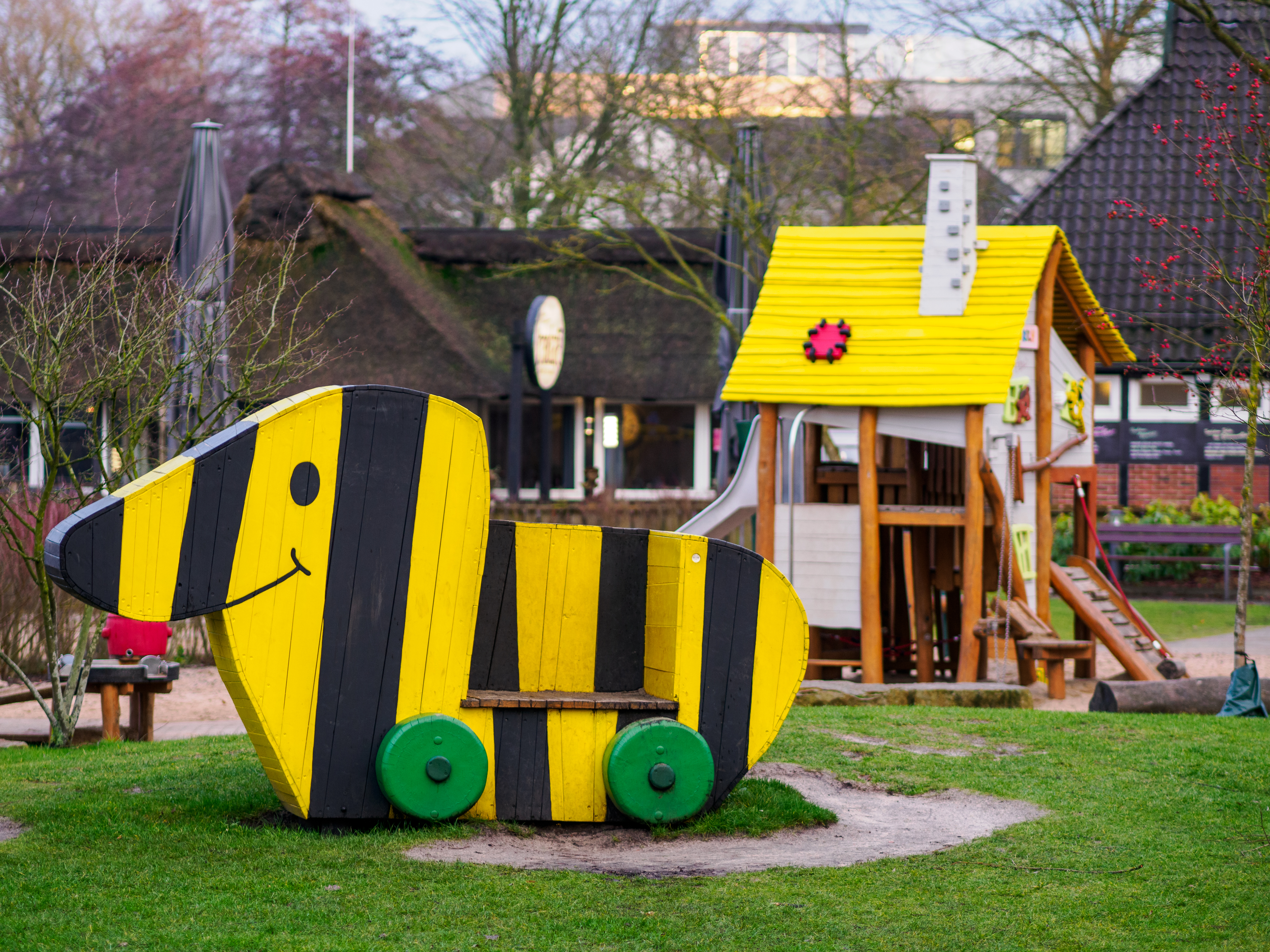
A tigerente bench in a playground named after Janosch

Janosch died in Tenerife, Spain, on 3 November 2026, at the age of 95.

=== Tigerente ===
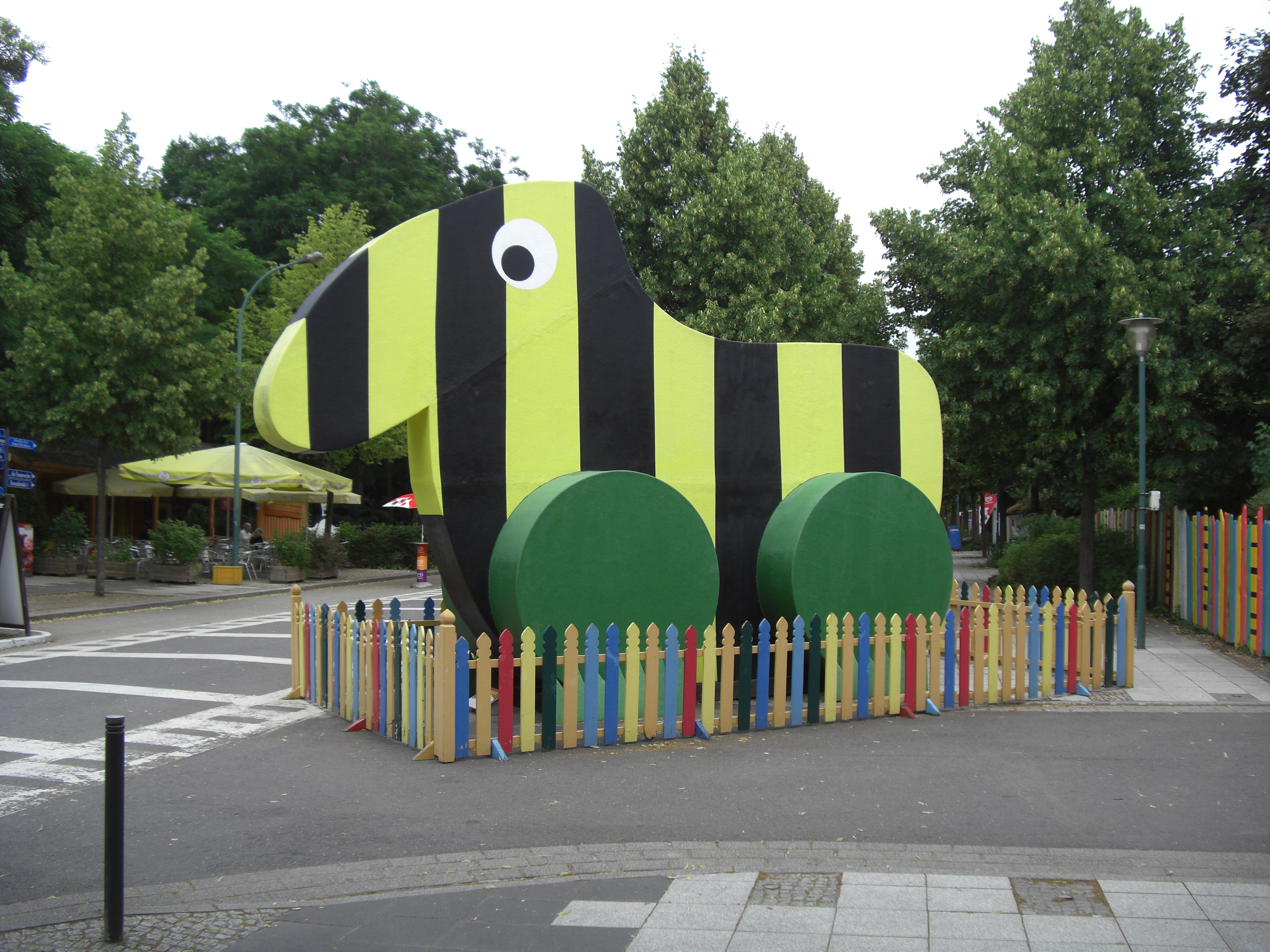
Tigerente at the Babelsberg Studio

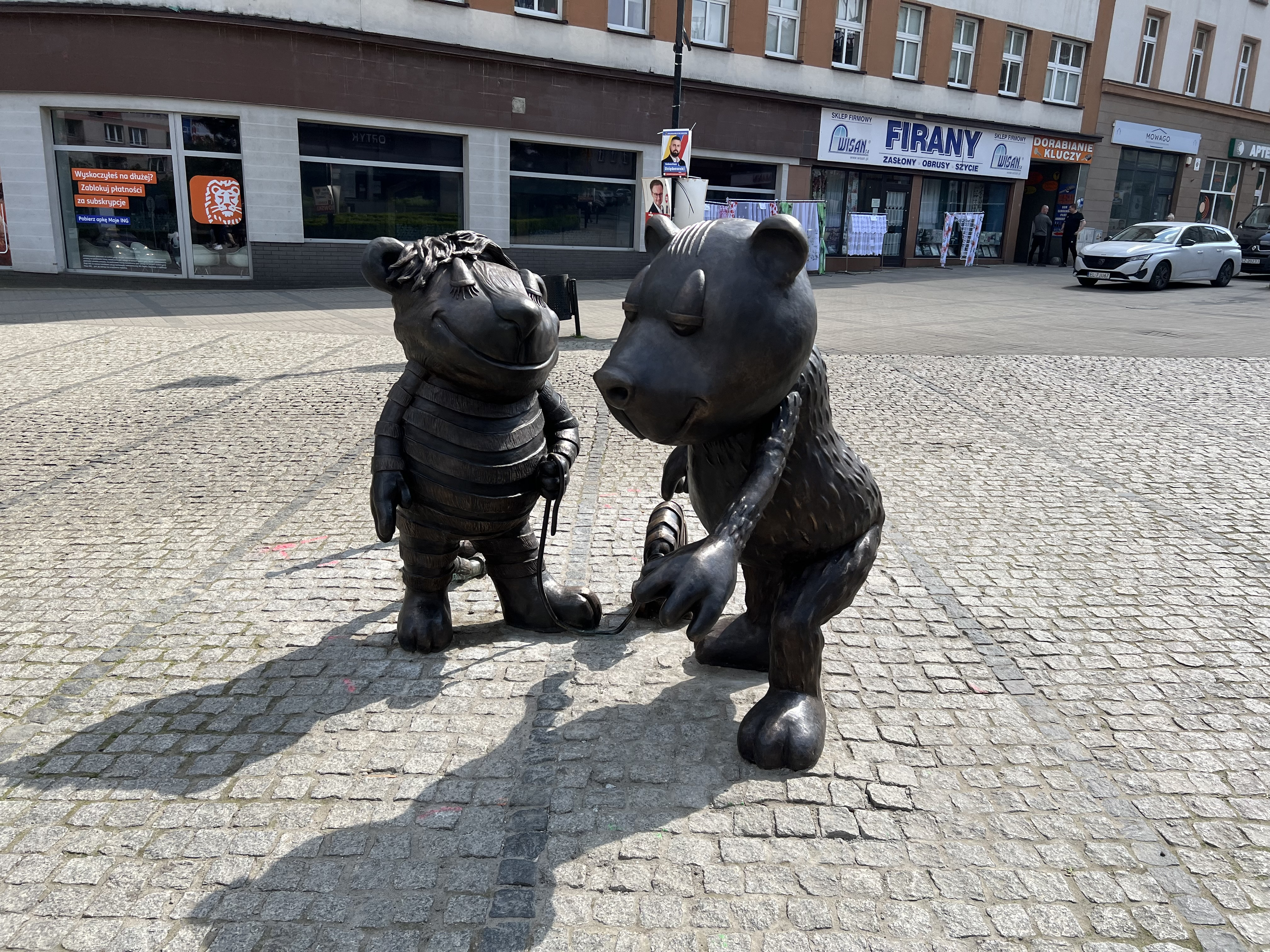
A sculpture of the Tiger, the Bear, and the Tigerente in Zabrze

The Tigerente (lit. tiger duck) is a children's book character created by Janosch. It is a small, wooden, striped black on yellow toy duck on wheels that is pulled around on a string by various characters from Janosch's books. It never speaks, and has since appeared on a wide range of products, including posters, postcards, high school art projects, buttons, mugs, socks, umbrellas, cutlery, and children's furniture. It is the namesake and mascot of the German TV show Tigerenten Club.

== Awards ==
Among others, he received the following awards:

- 1975: Literaturpreis der Stadt München
- 1979: German Youth Literature Award
- 1983 and 1987: Zilveren Penseel
- 1984: Zilveren Griffel
- 1993: Officer's Cross of the Order of Merit of the Federal Republic of Germany
- 1996: Morenhovener Lupe
- 1999: Kulturpreis Schlesien des Landes Niedersachsen
- 1999: Order of Manuel Amador Guerrero
- 2002: Bayerischer Poetentaler

== Works ==
Janosch published about 150 books in German, which in part were translated into 30 languages.

- Die Geschichte von Valek dem Pferd. Georg-Lentz-Verlag, Munich 1960.
- Valek und Jarosch. Georg-Lentz-Verlag, Munich 1960.
- Das kleine Schiff. Georg-Lentz-Verlag, Munich 1960. ISBN 978-3-407-80267-5
- Der Josa mit der Zauberfidel. Georg-Lentz-Verlag, Munich 1960.
- Onkel Poppoff kann auf Bäume fliegen. Parabel-Verlag, Munich 1964.
- Das Auto hier heißt Ferdinand. Parabel-Verlag, Munich 1964, ISBN 978-3-407-79316-4.
- Böllerbam und der Vogel. Middelhauve Verlag, Cologne 1968, DNB-IDN 457091916.
- Cholonek oder Der liebe Gott aus Lehm. Georg-Bitter-Verlag, Recklinghausen 1970, ISBN 978-3-7903-0125-0.
- Lari Fari Mogelzahn. Beltz-Verlag, Weinheim 1971, ISBN 978-3-407-80207-1.
- Leo Zauberfloh. dtv, Munich 1975, ISBN 978-3-423-07025-6.
- Sacharin im Salat. Bertelsmann-Verlag, Munich 1975, ISBN 978-3-570-00047-2.
- Update on Rumpelstiltskin and other Fairy Tales by 43 Authors. Beltz & Gelberg, Weinheim 1976, ISBN 978-3-407-80518-8.
- Traumstunde für Siebenschläfer. Beltz-Verlag, Weinheim 1977, ISBN 978-3-407-80526-3.
- Die Maus hat rote Strümpfe an. Beltz-Verlag, Weinheim 1978, ISBN 978-3-407-80538-6.
- Oh, wie schön ist Panama. Beltz-Verlag, Weinheim 1978, ISBN 978-3-407-80533-1.
  - English translation: The Trip to Panama. Beltz & Gelberg Verlag, Weinheim 1990, ISBN 978-3-407-78074-4. translator: Anthea Bell
- Sandstrand. Beltz-Verlag, Weinheim 1979, ISBN 978-3-407-80758-8; Merlin Verlag, Gifkendorf 2001, ISBN 978-3-87536-218-3.
- Komm, wir finden einen Schatz. Beltz-Verlag, Weinheim 1979, ISBN 978-3-407-80555-3.
- Schnuddelbuddel sagt Gutnacht. Deutscher Taschenbuch Verlag, Munich 1979, ISBN 978-3-423-07506-0.
- Post für den Tiger. Beltz-Verlag, Weinheim 1980, ISBN 978-3-407-78031-7.
- The City meets the Country. Beltz & Gelberg, Weinheim 1980, ISBN 978-3-407-80570-6.
- Das Leben der Thiere. Beltz-Verlag, Weinheim 1981, ISBN 978-3-407-80585-0.
- Rasputin der Vaterbär. Beltz-Verlag, Weinheim 1983, ISBN 978-3-407-80270-5.
- Ich mach dich gesund, sagte der Bär. Diogenes-Verlag, Zürich 1985, ISBN 978-3-407-79335-5.
- Das Lumpengesindel. Diogenes-Verlag, Zürich 1987, ISBN 978-3-257-00689-6.
- Der Mäuse-Sheriff. Georg Bitter Verlag, Recklinghausen 1989, ISBN 978-3-931081-05-8.
- Die Kunst der bäuerlichen Liebe 1. Teil. Merlin Verlag, Gifkendorf 1990, ISBN 978-3-926112-26-2.
- Du bist ein Indianer, Hannes. Bitter Verlag, Recklinghausen 1990, ISBN 978-3-7903-0388-9.
- Polski Blues. Goldmann Verlag, Munich 1991, ISBN 978-3-442-30417-2.
- Zurück nach Uskow. Merlin Verlag, Gifkendorf 1992, ISBN 978-3-926112-34-7.
- Schäbels Frau. Goldmann Verlag, Munich 1992, ISBN 978-3-442-30442-4.
- Mutter sag, wer macht die Kinder?. Mosaik-Verlag, Munich 1992, ISBN 978-3-576-10038-1.
- Von dem Glück, Hrdlak gekannt zu haben. Goldmann Verlag, Munich 1994, ISBN 978-3-442-30443-1.
- Von dem Glück, als Herr Janosch überlebt zu haben. Merlin Verlag, Gifkendorf 1994, ISBN 978-3-926112-25-5.
- Franz mit dem verdammten Hut. Little Tiger Verlag, Hamburg 1995, ISBN 978-3-423-70389-5.
- Schnuddel baut ein Wolkenhaus. Isis Verlag, Chur 1995, DNB-IDN 949586870.
- Schnuddels Gute-Nacht-Geschichten. Isis Verlag, Chur 1995, DNB-IDN 94958696X.
- Wörterbuch der Lebenskunst. Goldmann Verlag, Munich 1995, ISBN 978-3-442-30626-8.
- Gastmahl auf Gomera. Goldmann Verlag, Munich 1997, ISBN 978-3-442-30662-6.
- Restaurant & Mutterglück oder Das Kind. Merlin Verlag, Gifkendorf 1998, ISBN 978-3-926112-79-8.
- Ich liebe eine Tigerente. Mosaik-Verlag, Munich 1999, ISBN 978-3-576-11318-3.
- Janoschs großer, kleiner Tigeratlas. Bassermann, Munich 2002, ISBN 978-3-8094-1239-7.
- Janoschs Tausend-Bilder-Lexikon. Bassermann, Munich 2002, ISBN 978-3-8094-1240-3.
- Wie der Tiger zählen lernt. Bassermann, Munich 2002, ISBN 978-3-8094-1238-0.
- Wie der Tiger lesen lernt. Bassermann, Munich 2002, ISBN 978-3-8094-1237-3.
- Bei Liebeskummer Apfelmus. Bassermann, Munich 2002, ISBN 978-3-8094-1371-4.
- Morgen kommt der Weihnachtsbär. Bassermann, Munich 2002, ISBN 978-3-8094-1369-1.
- Wenn Schnuddel in die Schule geht und andere Geschichten. cbj, Munich 2006, ISBN 978-3-570-21622-4.
- Gibt es hitzefrei in Afrika? So leben die Kinder dieser Welt. Heyne Verlag, Munich 2006, ISBN 978-3-453-12089-1.
