= Arica House of Culture =

National monument of Chile

Coordinates: 18°28′38″S 70°19′16″W

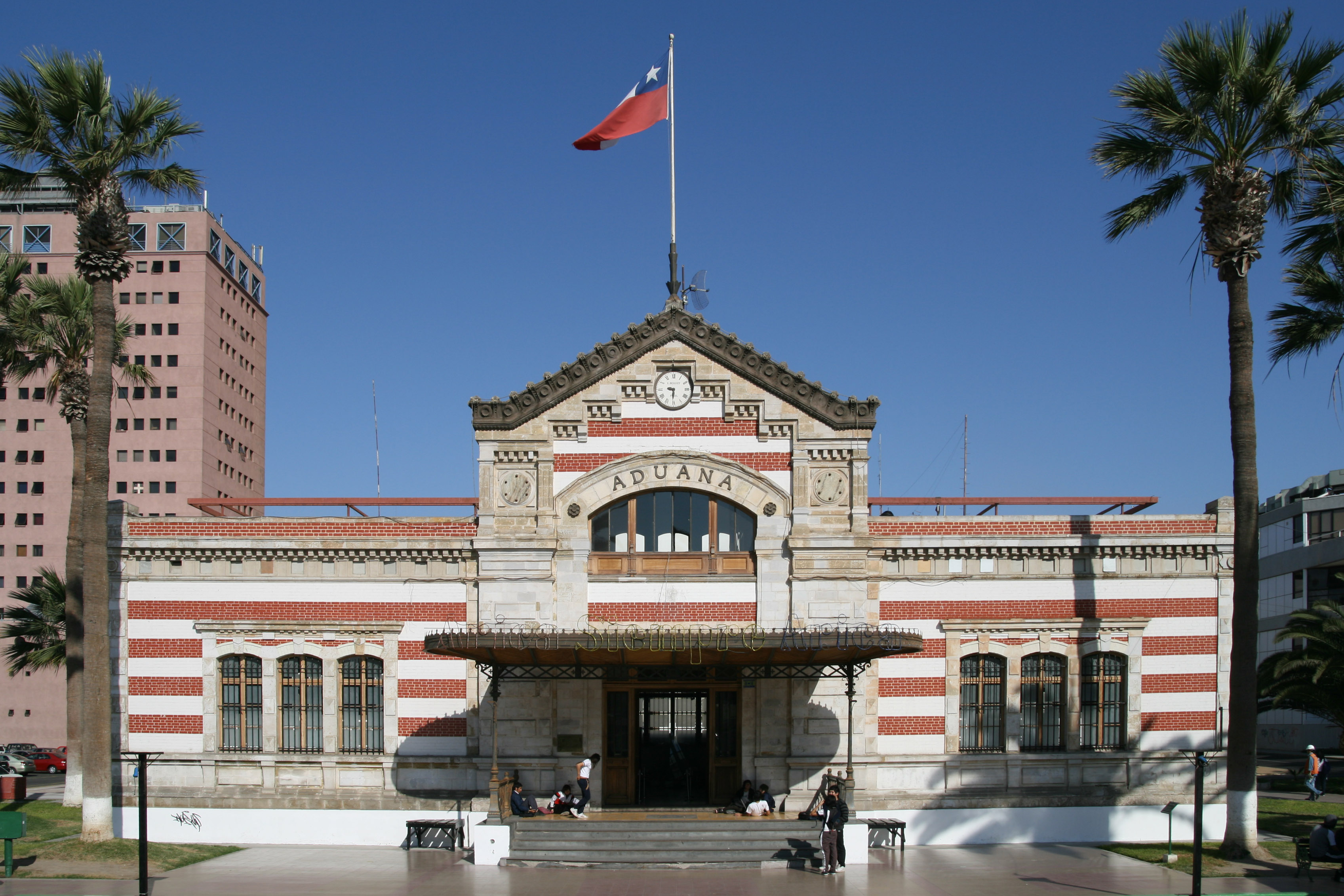

General information
- Location: Arica
- Country: Chile

The Arica House of Culture (Spanish: Casa de la Cultura de Arica), also known as Former Arica Custom House, is a building located in Arica, Chile. Designed by Gustave Eiffel's company, it was built between 1871 and 1874, prior to the annexation of Arica by Chile. The building was declared a National Monument of Chile on November 23, 1977, within the category of Historic Monuments.

== History ==
The 1868 Arica earthquake destroyed the earlier custom house, which was built on the same site. As a result, in 1871 the then Peruvian president José Balta commissioned Gustave Eiffel's company to design a building to serve as a custom house, which was inaugurated in 1874. It is a prefabricated building whose components were brought from Paris. The building survived the tsunami of 1877.

Following the Battle of Arica during the War of the Pacific, Arica came under the control of Chile, but the building continued operating as a custom house until 1977, and in 1991 it was converted into a cultural center.

A renovation project was completed in 2020, which included structural repairs.

== Description ==
Built in the Neo-classical style, the building has a roughly rectangular plan. The exterior walls are made of bricks brought from France, reinforced with ashlar columns. The building consists of a two-story central section with flanking one story wings. The roof structure and the interior columns are made of metal.
