= Casa Yanulaque =

Historical building and consulate in Chile

Coordinates: 18°28′48″S 70°18′58″W

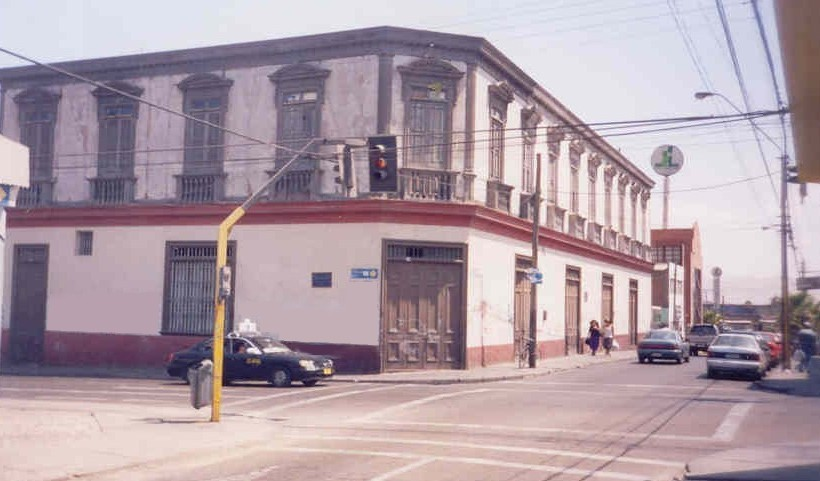
- Interactive map of Casa Yanulaque

General information
- Location: General Lagos 509, Arica
- Year built: 19th century
- Owner: Peruvian State

Website
- Official site of the Consulate General

The Casa Yanulaque is a historical building located in the Chilean city of Arica, in the corner of 18 de Septiembre and General Lagos streets. It is owned by the Peruvian State as part of the 1929 Treaty of Lima, and currently houses its consulate-general.

It is named after the Yanulaque Ayala family (Greek: Γιαννουλάκης, romanized: Giannoulakis), a Greek family currently well known in the city that once promoted a plebiscite during the Chilean–Peruvian territorial dispute.

== History ==
The house dates back to the 19th century, when Manuel Yanulaque Scorda, a Greek immigrant from Paros, and his Afro-Peruvian wife, María Esperanza Ayala, opened the La Colmena warehouse at the Pasaje Chucuito (today Sangra), where products were exported to nearby Arequipa and La Paz. After the city was occupied during the War of the Pacific and the years following it, it was subjected to the process of Chilenization as the military occupation continued until the Treaty of Lima was signed in 1929, when it was formally incorporated into Chile. The former warehouse, closed in 1980, has since been transformed into a cultural centre.

It also functioned as a cinema, a consular facility and, among other uses, it housed the Peruvian colony residing in Arica in its spacious rooms for several years; grouped in the "Circle of Peruvian Residents"; which maintained its headquarters and a restaurant with Peruvian cuisine preparations in this area. After the 1987 earthquake and due to the damage suffered, it did not continue operating.

In 2009, the restoration process began with the subscription of the Ministry of Foreign Affairs of Peru in an agreement with the Regional Government and the Provincial Municipality of Tacna and the Banco de la Nación for financing. In 2009, coordination began on recovery process. In 2011, restoration works began. The Peruvian consul in Arica, ítalo Augusto Acha Puertas, announced that the restoration works would finish in August 2014.

== List of Consuls-General ==
The Consul-General of Peru in Arica (Spanish: Cónsul General del Perú en Arica) is in charge of the Consulate in Arica, located at the building since 2014.

- ítalo Augusto Acha Puertas (2010–2015)
- José Eduardo Zeballos Valle (2016–2018)
- Julio César Cadenillas Londoña (2019–present)

== See also ==
- Peruvian Port in Arica
- Tacna–Arica railway
