= Ittetsu Shimizu =

Japanese composer of classical music (born 1976)

Ittetsu Shimizu (清水 一徹, Shimizu Ittetsu; born 1976) is a Japanese composer of classical music.

== Biography ==
Born in Yokohama in 1976, Shimizu studied music and composition at the Shobi Conservatory in Tokyo. After winning the composition prize of the Japan Music Association in 1999, he went on to win the International Composition Competition, Luxembourg, in 2002.

== Discography ==
- "International Composition Prize 2002, World Premiere Recordings": Carsten Hennig, "Ausflug nach Sing-Sing"; Stéphane Altier, "Treize Fragments de la Danse"; Nicholas Sackman, "Ballo"; Thoma Simaku, "Luxonorité"; Ittetsu Shimizu, "Suspiria de Profundis"; Carlos Satué, "Mizar-Alcor". Luxembourg Sinfonietta, Conductor: Marcel Wengler. CD LGNM No 402.
