= Tacna–Arica railway =

Railway line between Chile and Peru

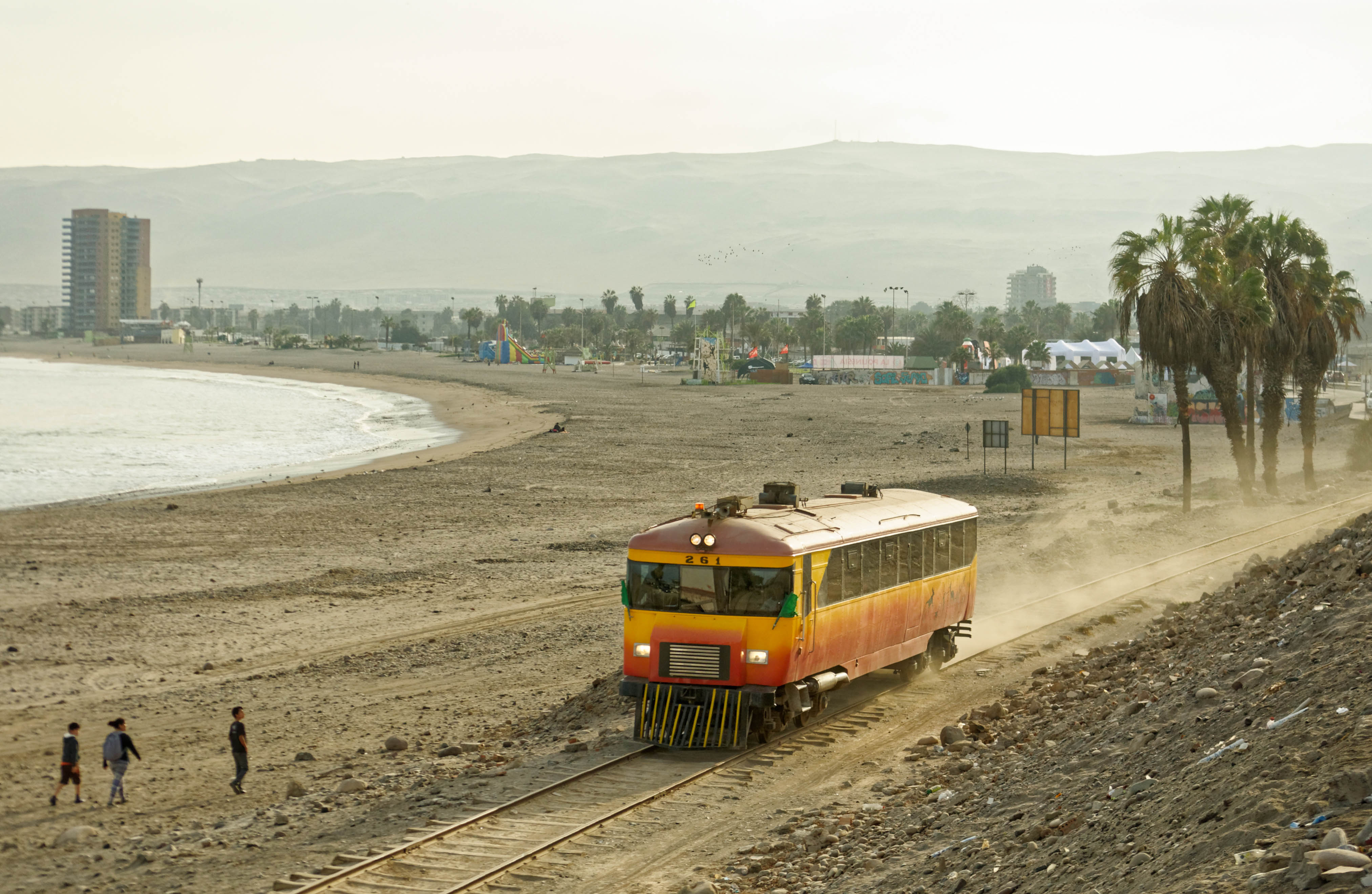
- A railbus traversing along the beaches of Arica

Overview
- Native name: Ferrocarril Tacna–Arica (Spanish)
- Owner: Regional Government of Tacna
- Locale: Peru and Chile
- Termini: Tacna; Arica
- Stations: 6 (2 active)

Service
- Type: Transcontinental railroad; Heritage railway
- Operator(s): Regional Government of Tacna
- Depot(s): National Railway Museum, Tacna
- Rolling stock: Railbus

History
- Opened: 1856
- Suspended: 12 March 2012
- Reopened: 28 May 2016

Technical
- Line length: 62 km (39 mi)
- Number of tracks: 1
- Track gauge: 1,435 mm (4 ft 8 1/2 in) standard gauge

The Tacna–Arica railway is a transnational railway that connects the cities of Tacna and Arica, located in Peru and Chile, respectively. Agreed upon as part of the 1929 Treaty of Lima, it has a length of 62 km (39 mi) and a track gauge of 1,435 mm (4.708 ft). It is currently administered by the Regional Government of Tacna and operates since May 28, 2016, after being suspended since March 12, 2012.

It was built in 1856 by the English company The Arica & Tacna Railway Co. It is currently the only international railway that Peru has and is the oldest railway that is still in service, since it was the second to be built, during the government of Ramón Castilla.

== Stations ==
The line has five bridges, at San José, Chacalluta, Gallinazo, Hospicio, and Lagartito. It also has six stations, of which only the 2 terminals are active:

Name	Country	Coordinates	Status
Tacna	Peru	18°00′46.8″S 70°15′16.8″W	Active
Kilómetro 42	Peru	18°06′54.7″S 70°19′37.4″W	Inactive
Hospicio	Peru	18°12′14.3″S 70°20′07.5″W	Inactive
Peru–Chile Border		18°18′47.1″S 70°19′31.9″W	
Escritos	Chile	18°19′06.7″S 70°19′30.0″W	Inactive
Chacalluta	Chile	18°23′54.4″S 70°18′26.5″W	Inactive
Arica	Chile	18°28′24.6″S 70°19′03.0″W	Active

In addition to the aforementioned stations, in the 1990s ENAFER documents indicate the existence of 2 other stops: Concordia (located 10 km south of Hospicio) and Frontera (6 km south of Concordia).

== See also ==
- Rail transport in Peru
- Casa Yanulaque
