= Luxembourg Sinfonietta =

Luxembourgish musical group

The Luxembourg Sinfonietta is an orchestral ensemble for contemporary music in the Grand Duchy of Luxembourg. Initially it consisted of ten to fifteen instruments, including tuba, accordion, mandolin and harpsichord, but now typically extends to clarinet, clarinet bass, alto saxophone, tenor saxophone, baritone saxophone, horn, trumpets, tenor trombone, tuba, violins, viola, violoncello, piano, mandolin, accordion and percussion.

== History ==
Founded in 1999 by the Luxembourg composer Marcel Wengler, it strives to make contemporary music more generally accessible while promoting Luxembourg composers, especially to foreign audiences. Key events here have been performances at the ISCM "World Music Days 2000" in Luxembourg and at Expo 2000 in Hanover. The Sinfonietta not only gives first time performances of contemporary works but also plays classics from the past century as well as its own orchestrations of existing works. As its repertoire covers all the most significant contemporary composers, the orchestra has been invited to a number of international festivals and has played in Germany, France, Switzerland, Romania and the Czech Republic. It also participated in the "World Music Days 2007" in Hong Kong and travelled to Beijing and Chengdu during its China tour in 2008.

== International composition competition ==
Since 2001, the Sinfonietta has arranged an annual international composition which has done much to establish Luxembourg as a European centre for musical innovation. Composers from all over the world are invited to compose new works for the Sinfonietta. Typically, some 150 composers from more than 40 countries take part each year. In this context, over 950 works have now been specially composed for the Luxembourg Sinfonietta.

The prizewinners have been:

- 2002: First prize: Ittetsu Shimizu (Japan), "Suspiria de Profundis"; second prize: Carsten Hennig (Germany), "Ausflug nach Sing-Sing"; third prize: Stéphane Altier (France), "Treize Fragments de la Danse".
- 2003: First prize: Francisco Lara (Spain), second prize: Patrick Harrex (England), third prize: Cristian Marina (Sweden).
- 2004: First prize: Chañaral Ortega-Miranda (Chile), second prize: Lin Wang (China), third prize: Satoru Ikeda (Japan).
- 2005: First prize: Cristina Pascual (Spain), second prize: Ezequiel Menalled (Argentina), third prize: Maiko Nakao (Japan) and Frank Zabel (Germany).
- 2006: First prize: Barnaby Hollington (Great Britain), second prize: Alexander Shchetynsky (Ukraine), third prize: Maki Nakajima (Japan).
- 2007: First prize: Nicholas Casswell (Great Britain), second prize: Robert Lemay (Canada), third prize: Akihiro Kano (Japan), fourth prize: Gordon Hamilton (Australia).
- 2008: First prize: Huang Ruo (USA), second prize: Lan-chee Lam (Canada), third prize: Kee Yong Chong (Malaysia), fourth prize: Xiaozhong Yang (China).
- 2009: First prize: Zhenzhen Zhang (China), second prize: Takahiro Sakuma (Japan), third prize Pui-shan Cheung (Hong Kong), fourth prize Miguel Farias (Chile).

== Discography ==
- "World Premiere Recordings": Lisa Reim, "Tiger’s cry"; Luca Vanneschi, "Maqam"; Pierre Couprie, "Ainsi, toujours, vers l’azur"; Tony K.T. Leung, "Seven trumpets of the Seven Angels", Lars Graugaard, "Fractured Waves"; Jean-Luc Darbellay, "Lux"; Andreas Pflüger, "Contrasts"; Serban Nichifor, "La Nuit Obscure". Luxembourg Sinfonietta, Conductor: Marcel Wengler. CD LGNM No 401.
- "International Composition Prize 2002, World Premiere Recordings": Carsten Hennig, "Ausflug nach Sing-Sing"; Stéphane Altier, "Treize Fragments de la Danse"; Nicholas Sackman, "Ballo"; Thoma Simaku, "Luxonorité"; Ittetsu Shimizu, "Suspiria de Profundis"; Carlos Satué, "Mizar-Alcor". Luxembourg Sinfonietta, Conductor: Marcel Wengler. CD LGNM No 402.
- "International Composition Prize 2003, World Premiere Recordings": Francisco Lara, "Dust"; Patrick Harrex, "Hauptweg und Nebenwege"; Cristian Marina, "Density - Intensity"; Paul Robinson, "Chamber Concerto"; Kyung-Jin Han, "Dancing on a Bamboo"; Marco Carnevalini, "Riflessioni sul giallo e sul blu". Luxembourg Sinfonietta, Conductor: Marcel Wengler. CD LGNM No 403.
- "International Composition Prize 2004, World Premiere Recordings": Chañaral Ortega-Miranda, "Q'inti"; Lin Wang, "Lin Lang"; Satoru Ikeda, "Fireworks"; Matteo Franceschini, "Làbara"; Jonathan Eato, "Bling Bling Balaam". Luxembourg Sinfonietta, Conductor: Marcel Wengler. CD LGNM No 404.
- "International Composition Prize 2005, World Premiere Recordings": Maiko Nakao, "naminoyo"; Cristina Pascual, "Magnetism"; Ezequiel Menalled, "and everything was death"; Frank Zabel, "Chant de la Lave"; Lorenc Xhuvani, "di tenue vivo chiarore". Luxembourg Sinfonietta, Conductor: Marcel Wengler. CD LGNM No 405.
- "International Composition Prize Luxembourg 2006, World Premiere Recordings, New Works for Solo-Piano and Orchestra: Alice Ho, "Angst II"; Barnaby Hollington, "Mechanical Avunculogratulation"; Alexander Shchetynsky, "Chamber Concerto"; Maki Nakajima, "passing rain"; Iain Matheson, "Equal Parts". Luxembourg Sinfonietta, Soloists: Zénon Bialas, Annie Kraus, Pascal Meyer, Xenia Pestova. Conductor: Marcel Wengler. CD LGNM No 406.
- "International Composition Prize Luxembourg 2007, World Premiere Recordings": Nicholas Casswell, "Triplicity"; Robert Lemay, "Mare Tranquilitatis III"; Akihiro Kano, "The Fifth Station"; Gordon Hamilton, "Sinfonietta Concertante". Luxembourg Sinfonietta, Conductor: Marcel Wengler. CD LGNM No 407.
- International Composition Prize Luxembourg 2008, World Premiere Recordings, New Works for Solo-Sheng and Orchestra": Huang Ruo, "MO"; Lan-chee Lam, "Threnody for the Earth"; Kee Yong Chong, "Phoenix calling"; Xiaozhong Yang, "Horsetail Whisk II", Lok-yin Tang, "It is What it is!"; Stephen Yip, "Six Paths". Luxembourg Sinfonietta, Soloist: Wu Wei, Conductor: Marcel Wengler. CD LGNM No 408.
- "International Composition Prize, Luxembourg 2009": Pui-shan Cheung, "Chi’en III"; Miguel Farias, "Acier"; Takahiro Sakuma, "Against the Current", Zhenzhen Zhang, "Xiang"; Luxembourg Sinfonietta, Conductor: Marcel Wengler. CD LGNM No 104.
