= Nicholas Casswell =

English composer (born 1974)

Nicholas (Nick) Casswell (born 1974) is an English composer specializing in chamber music.

== Biography ==
Born on 25 July 1974 in Cheltenham, Casswell studied at the Dartington College of Arts in Devon (1993–96) and at the University of York (1998–99). Thereafter he completed his PhD studies in composition at the University of Leeds.

In 2000, his string quartet composition "Papillon" won the Leeds Philosophical and Literary Society’s Millennium Composing Award and was also performed at the 2001 Gaudeamus Music Week. The first movement of his "The Transformation and Other Stories" earned him the title of most promising composer at the 7th International Young Composers Meeting in Apeldoorn. In 2003, "Temporal Trajectories" for percussion quartet was awarded second prize at the 2nd Jurgenson International Young Composers Competition in Moscow. Under a fellowship awarded by the Arts and Humanities Research Council, he conducted research into the Korean folk music sanjo at London University's School of Oriental and African Studies. Nicholas Casswell is currently Lecturer in Interdisciplinary Performing Arts at University of Central Lancashire, Preston.

== Awards ==
- First Prize, International Composition Competition, Luxembourg, 2007.
- ISCM-IAMIC Young Composer Award (2007).

== Works ==
Among Nicholas Casswell's works are:

- "Chorisis", orchestral ensemble (14 players), 1999
- "Return", flute, oboe, clarinet, French horn, trumpet, violin, double bass, 1998
- "Papillon", string quartet, 1999
- "Methexis", alto saxophone, 1999
- "Temporal Trajectories", four percussion, 2000
- "The Transformation and Other Stories", two sopranos, tenor, baritone, flute, clarinet, two saxophones, two French horns, trumpet, trombone, electric guitar, bass guitar, piano, percussion, 2001
- "distance ... presence", flute, clarinet, two saxophones, two French horns, trumpet, trombone, electric guitar, bass guitar, piano, percussion, 2002
- "Piano Quartet", violin, viola, cello, piano, 2002
- "Lumine", four male voices, 2002
- "Triplicity", orchestral ensemble, 2007

== Discography ==
- "International Composition Prize Luxembourg 2007, World Premiere Recordings": Nicholas Casswell, "Triplicity"; Robert Lemay, "Mare Tranquilitatis III"; Akihiro Kano, "The Fifth Station"; Gordon Hamilton, "Sinfonietta Concertante". Luxembourg Sinfonietta, Conductor: Marcel Wengler. CD LGNM No 407.
