= Landestheater Tübingen =

Building in Tübingen, Baden-Württemberg, Germany

- Städtische Schauspielhaus Tübingen
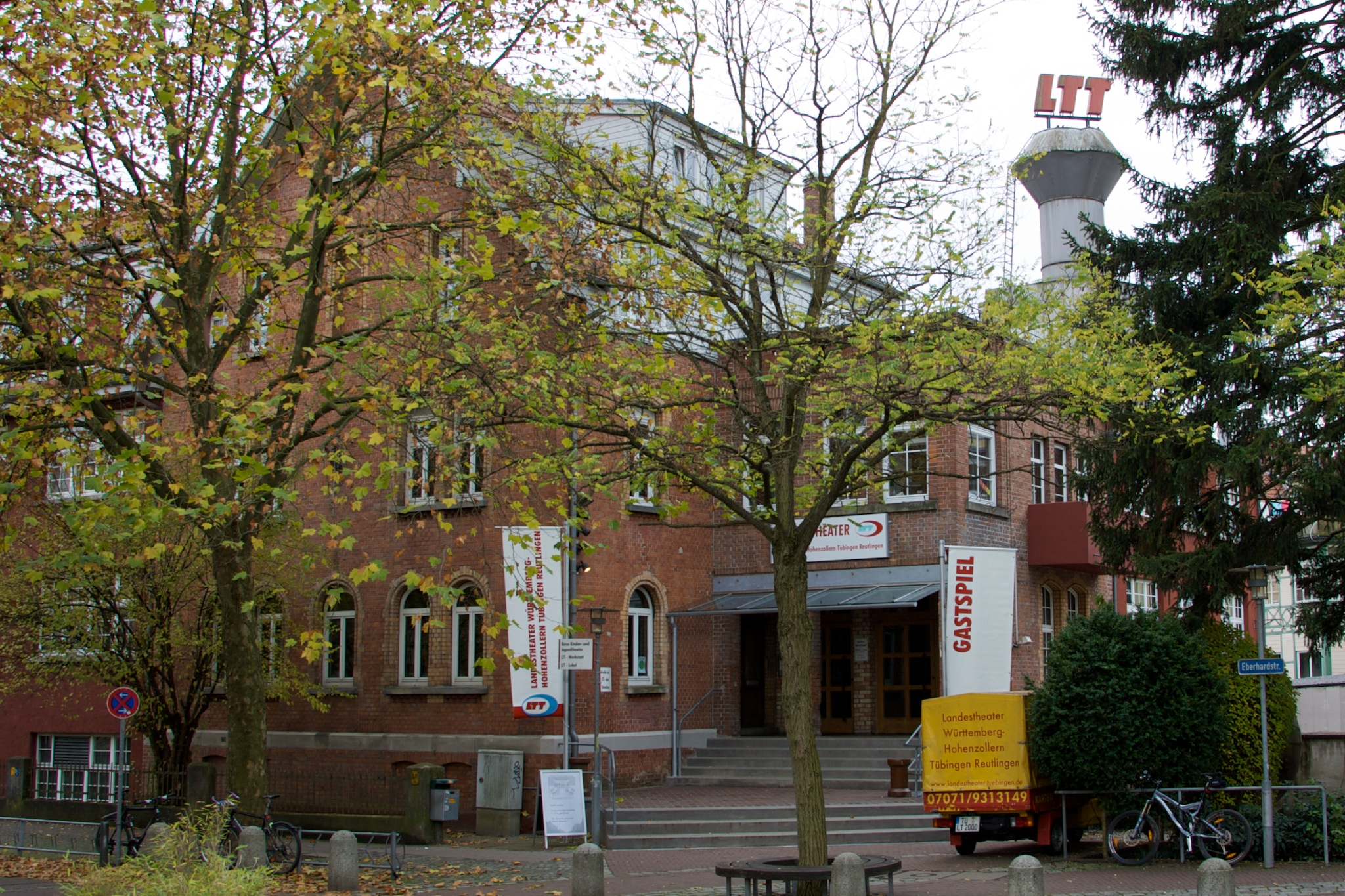
- Interactive map of Landestheater Tübingen
- Address: Eberhardstraße; Tübingen, Baden-Württemberg; Germany
- Coordinates: 48°30′54″N 9°03′48″E

Construction
- Opened: 1945 (using Schiller Hall, part of a local museum)
- Rebuilt: 1975 (new site)
- Years active: 1945 – present

Website
- www.landestheater-tuebingen.de

Landestheater Tübingen is a theatre in Baden-Württemberg, Germany. It is known as 'LTT' for short, officially also 'Landestheater Württemberg-Hohenzollern Tübingen Reutlingen', is a cultural enterprise financed in Tübingen by public funds, donations and entrance fees. It puts on its mainly own productions, but also – partly foreign-language – guest performances. In addition to the so-called "evening game plan", it also has its own children's and youth theater division.

The Landestheater performs beyond with its productions for large and small stages, and with the Junge LTT also for kindergartens, classrooms etc. More than a quarter of its more than 900 performances a year are outside the theatre.

== History ==
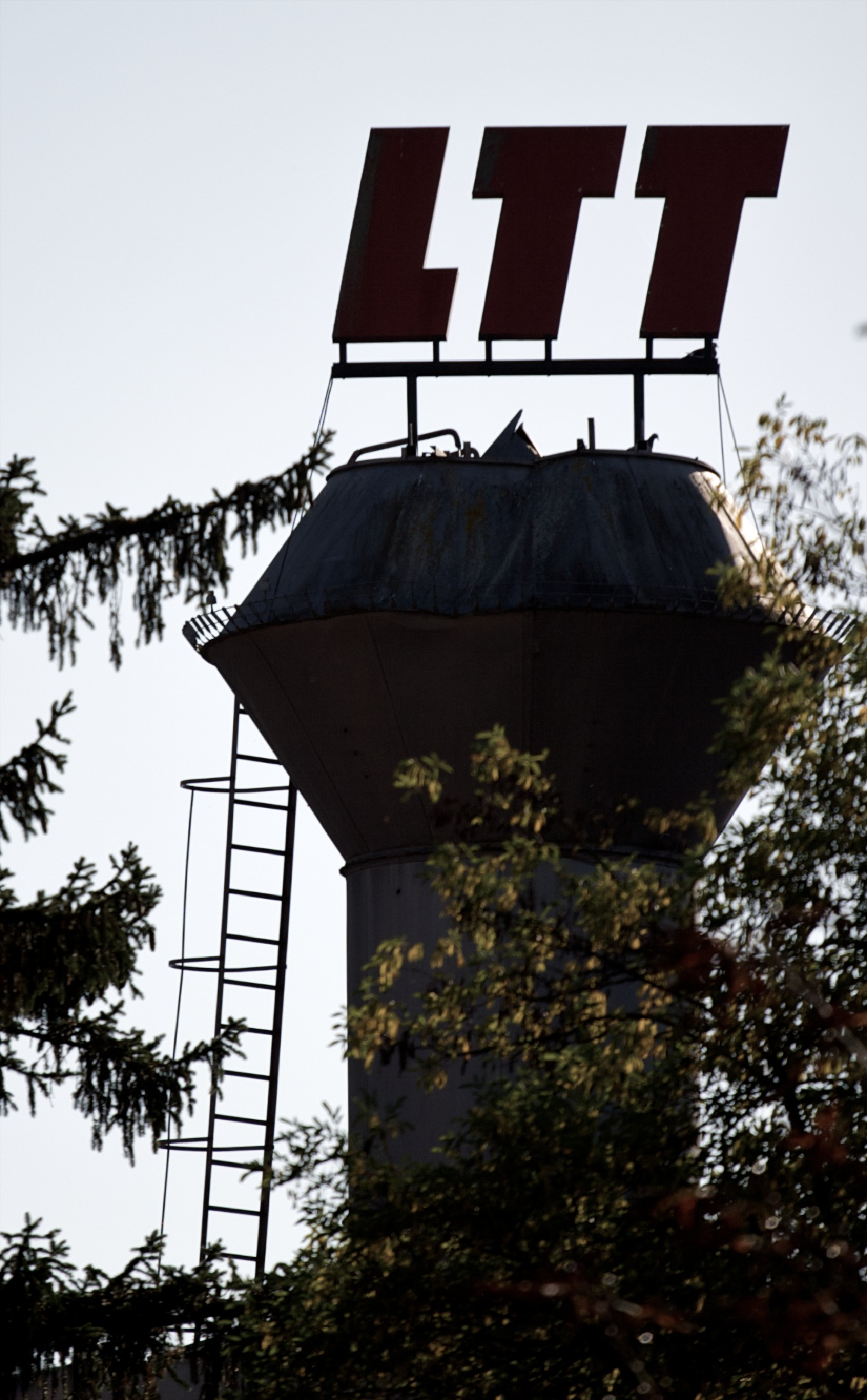
LTT logo on the chimney of the former Stuhlfabrik Schäfer. Redundant former chair factory, dismantled in 1975

The history of the Landestheater Württemberg-Hohenzollern Tübingen Reutlingen dates back to the postwar period. In 1945, the "Städtische Schauspielhaus Tübingen" with the Schiller Hall of a local museum as a venue, a multipurpose room that was also used as a cinema, was created from a free play group. In 1947, the cities of Tübingen and Reutlingen merged to form a "Zweckverband Städtetheater Tübingen Reutlingen". With the support of the former state of Württemberg-Hohenzollern. In 1950, the current state theater emerged. The country's financial participation allowed the theater to hold its own during the critical years following the currency reform, and began to schedule scheduled gaming operations and to produce performances for guest performances in the region. For a long time, however, the theater depended on the museum to use as a venue, which in the long run represented an enormous burden. Workshop, rehearsal and office space were missing, the theater infrastructure was insufficient. Because of the financial crisis, both the considerations for a new theater construction and for an expansion of the museum failed. However, since the space requirement blew up the spatial possibilities of the museum and the fire, construction and industrial police finally considered the game mode no longer responsible,

After the reconstruction of the museum, which started in 1962, failed due to the different interests of the museum owners and the state theater, as well as the lack of government subsidies from the city of Tübingen, the LTT finally began to search for a solution on its own. In 1975, the solo venue was found. A redundant chair factory 'Schäfer', which was vacant at that time, was converted into the LTT headquarters during a four-year planning and construction phase.

On 23 September 1978, the theatre started acting workshops with the German premiere of "Mensch Meier" by Franz Xaver Kroetz. On 21 September 1979, finally, the Great Hall was inaugurated and opened with Friedrich Schiller's "Die Räuber".

Five years later, in 1984, an independent children's and youth theater division was founded at the LTT, today's "Young LTT". It celebrated its 30th anniversary in 2014. Michael Miensopust is its director. It puts on its own junior productions.

Noted productions:

- 1982, Hamlet, directed by Pit Drescher
- 1982, The Man of La Mancha, directed by Stefan Viering
- 1983, Emilia Galotti (by Gotthold Ephraim Lessing), directed by Marinelli
- 1983, The Opera from the Large Hanggelte, directed by W. Kolneder
- 1983, Fazz and Zwoo, directed by W. Fink
- 1983, The Beautiful Helena, directed by Istvan Iglodi
- 1983, Jumbo Track, directed by Gunther Möllmann
- 1984, The Gull, directed by Brigitte Soubeyrand
- 1984, Measure for Measure (by Shakespeare), directed by Pit Drescher

== Intendants (managing directors) ==
1945–1946	1946–1947	1947–1950	1950–1964	1964–1967	1967–1970	1970–1975	1975–1978	1978–1984	1984–1991	1991–1995	1995–2001 and 2002	2002, 2003–2004, 2005	2005, 2006–2013, 2014	2014/15-present
Wolfgang Müller	Günther Stark	Paul Rose	Fritz Herterich	Christoph Groszer	Ernst Seiltgen	Manfred Beilharz	Alf Reigl	Klaus Pierwoß	Bernd Leifeld	Manfred Weber	Knut Weber	Peter Spuhler	Simone Sterr	Thorsten Weckherlin
