= Arica =

City in Arica y Parinacota, Chile

- City and Commune
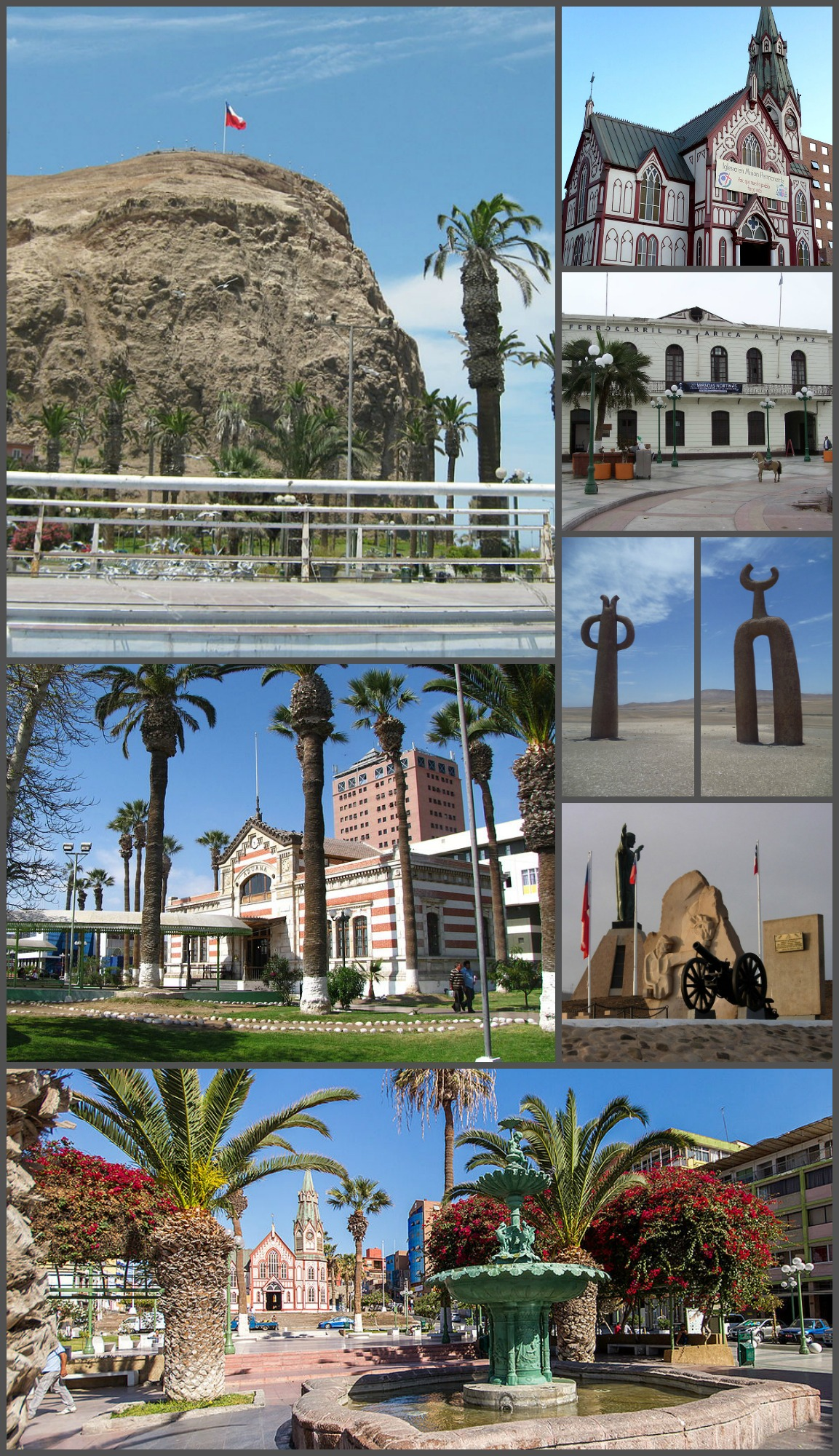
- Clockwise from top left: Morro de Arica, Arica Cathedral, station of the Arica-La Paz railway, Casa de la Cultura de Arica, Presencias tutelares sculptures, Museum of History and Weapon, and Plaza Colón

- Flag Coat of arms Map of Arica y Parinacota Region Location in Chile
- Nickname(s): Ciudad de la Eterna Primavera ("City of the eternal spring")
- Motto(s): Mayor es mi lealtad ("Greater is my loyalty")
- Coordinates: 18°28′42″S 70°19′16″W
- Country: Chile
- Region: Arica y Parinacota
- Province: Arica
- Founded: 1541
- Founder: Lucas Martinez de Begazo

Government
  - Type: Municipality
  - Alcalde: Orlando Vargas

Area
  - Total: 4,799.4 km^{2} (1,853.1 sq mi)
  - Rank: Arica
- Elevation: 2 m (6.6 ft)

Population (2024)
  - Total: 241,653
  - Density: 50.351/km^{2} (130.41/sq mi)
- Demonym(s): Arican ariqueño, -a (Spanish)
- Time zone: UTC−04:00 (CLT)
  - Summer (DST): UTC−03:00 (CLST)
- Postal code: 1000000
- País: +56 58
- Climate: BWh
- Website: Official website (in Spanish)

Arica (/əˈriːkə/ ə-REE-kə; Spanish: [aˈɾika]) is a port city and commune in the Arica Province of northern Chile's Arica y Parinacota Region. It is Chile's northernmost city, being located only 18 km (11 mi) south of the border with Peru. The city is the capital of both the Arica Province and the Arica and Parinacota Region. Arica is located at the bend of South America's western coast known as the Arica Bend or Arica Elbow. It is also where two valleys which dissect the Atacama Desert, Azapa and Lluta, converge. These valleys provide citrus and olives for export.

Arica is an important port for a large inland region of South America. The city serves a free port for Bolivia and manages a substantial part of that country's trade. In addition it is the end station of the Bolivian oil pipeline beginning in Oruro. The city's strategic position is enhanced by being next to the Pan-American Highway, being connected to both Tacna in Peru and La Paz in Bolivia by railroad and being served by an international airport.

Arica has an extremely dry climate, with almost no rainfall. Even so, the frequent maritime winds from the cold waters nearby renders a moderate desert climate. Its mild weather has made Arica known as the "city of the eternal spring" in Chile while its beaches are frequented by Bolivian society. The city was an important port already during Spanish colonial rule. Chile seized the city from Peru in 1880 during the War of the Pacific, being recognized as Chilean by Peru in 1929. A substantial part of African Chileans live in or trace their origins to Arica.

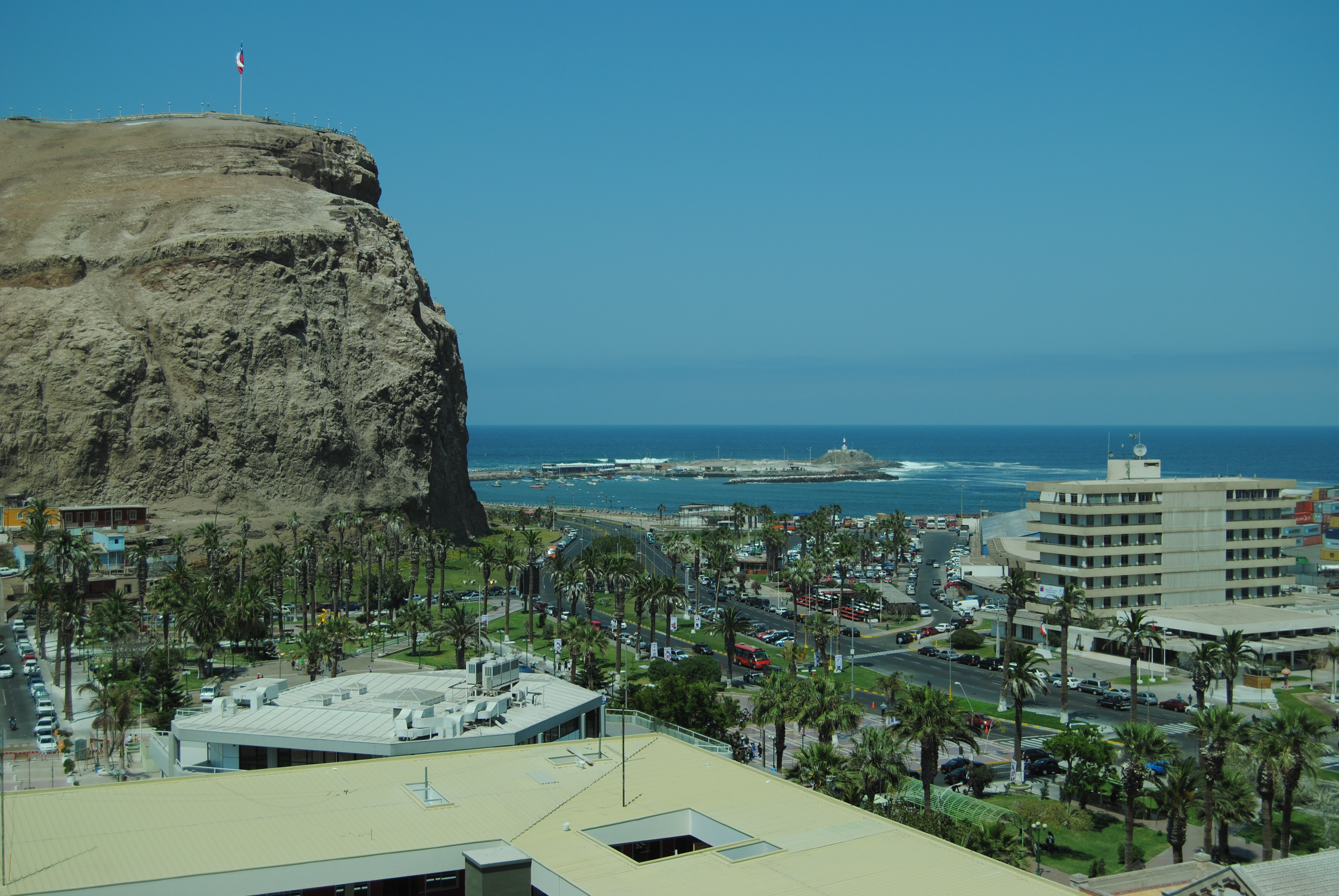
The morro de Arica is one of the major attractions in the city

== Etymology ==
The province's name comes from the Kunza term arisca, meaning 'new bay', or Ariacca, the name of the Inca chief who used to live in what is currently the city.

== History ==
Archaeological findings indicate that Arica was inhabited by different native groups dating back 10,000 years. These people are the first known culture to mummify their dead, predating the Egyptians by 2,000 years, and their mummies have been discovered as recently as 2004 and buried as shallow as <1 meter beneath the city's surface.

=== Colonial period ===
Spaniards settled the land under captain Lucas Martinez de Begazo in 1541, and in 1570, the area was grandly retitled as "La Muy Ilustre y Real Ciudad San Marcos de Arica" (the very illustrious and royal city of San Marcos of Arica). At the time of the Spanish settlement the region around Arica was already multiethnic displaying a mix of local sedentary populations and mitma settlers from the Altiplano. The proportions of these are that the first made up about 66% of the population and the latter 25%. The remaining 9% were fishing-oriented people known as Camanchacos. Many of the sedentary populations are thought to have spoken the Puquina language. In 1540 the encomienda system was established in Arica and its surroundings with conquistador Lucas Martínez de Vegaso obtaining 1,638 encomienda Indians (a third of tributaries distributed). Pedro Pizarro and Pedro de la Fuente followed in numbers receiving each approximately 600 tributaries.

By 1545, Arica was the main export entrepot for Bolivian silver coming down from Potosí, which then possessed the world's largest silver mine. Arica thus held a crucial role as one of the leading ports of the Spanish Empire. These enviable riches made Arica the target for pirates, buccaneers, and privateers, among whom Francis Drake, Thomas Cavendish, Richard Hawkins, Joris van Spilbergen, John Watling, Baltazar de Cordes, Bartholomew Sharp, William Dampier, and John Clipperton all took part in looting the city. From 1540 to 1570 the population in the region of Arica shrank by 36% due to disease, death in mining or emigration to evade the harsh conditions imposed by the Spanish. In 1570 the Francisco de Toledo issued a decree reorganizing indigenous labour and taxation and among other things imposing the mita minera. In November 1604 the city was hit by a destructive earthquake and tsunami, causing it to be rebuilt.

=== Peruvian period (1821–1880) ===
Following the collapse of Spanish rule, in 1821, Arica was part of the recently independent Peruvian state. The Peruvian Constitution of 1823 regards it as a province of the Department of Arequipa. In 1855, Peru inaugurated the Tacna–Arica railway (53 km long), one of the first in Latin America. The rail line still functions today.

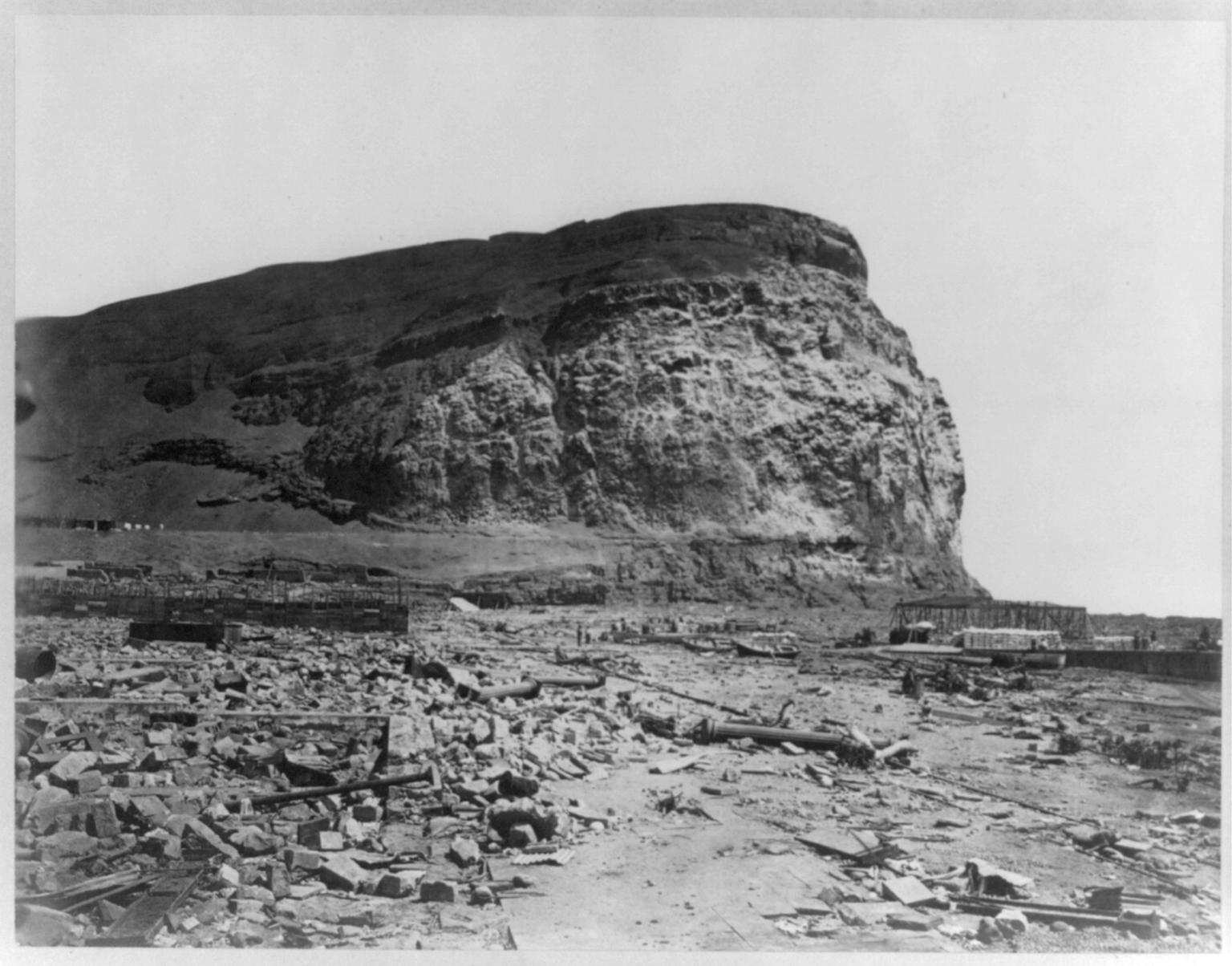
The 1868 earthquake devastated the city, leaving it in ruins under the Morro de Arica.

The earthquake of August 13, 1868 struck near the city with an estimated magnitude of 8.0 to 9.0. Estimates on the death toll vary greatly, some estimates have the number at 25,000 to 70,000 people. Others estimate that the population of Arica was less than 3,000 people and the death toll was around 300. It triggered a tsunami, measurable across the Pacific in Hawaii, Japan and New Zealand. As Arica lies very close to the subduction zone known as the Peru–Chile Trench where the Nazca Plate dives beneath the South American Plate, the city is subject to megathrust earthquakes.

=== Chilenization period (1880–1929) ===
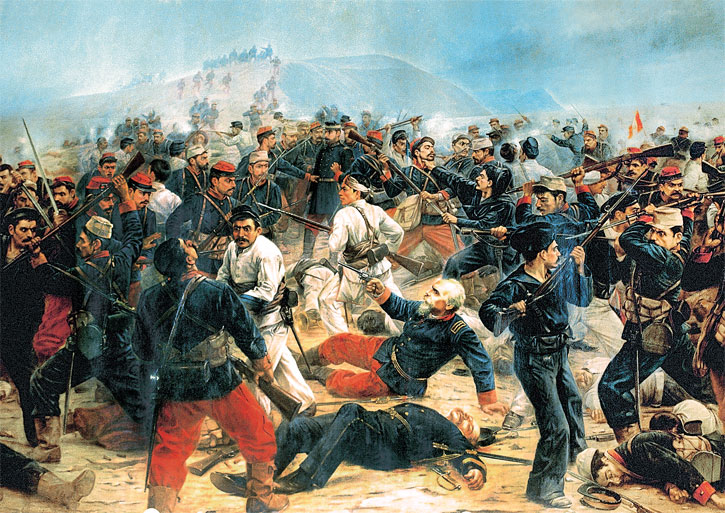
Depiction of the Battle of Arica, 7 June 1880

Chilean forces occupied the region following the War of the Pacific. The Treaty of Ancón in 1883 formally acceded the region to Chilean control. The 1929 Tacna-Arica compromise in the Treaty of Lima subsequently restored Tacna to Peru but Arica remained part of Chile.

=== Modern Arica (1929–present) ===
In 1958, the Chilean Government established the "Junta de Adelanto de Arica" (Board of Development for Arica), which promulgated many tax incentives for the establishment of industries, such as vehicle assembly plants, a tax-free zone, and a casino, among others. Many car manufacturers opened plants in Arica, such as Citroën, Peugeot, Volvo, Ford and General Motors, which produced the Chevrolet LUV pickup until 2008.

In 1975, together with Chile's new open economy policies, the "Junta de Adelanto de Arica" was abolished.

The Arica and Parinacota Region was created on October 8, 2007, under Law 20.175, promulgated on March 23, 2007, by President Michelle Bachelet in the city of Arica.

=== Promel toxic waste dumpsite ===
In 1984–1985, the Swedish metal company Boliden Mineral AB paid a local mineral extracting company, Promel Ldta., 10 million SEK ($1.2 million, $3.15 million in 2021 dollars) to receive, treat and confine around 20,000 tonnes of smeltery sludge from Rönnskärsverken in Skellefteå, containing among other things high levels of lead, arsenic, cadmium, mercury and iron and smaller amounts of gold and silver. To earn additional income, Promel planned to extract various substances from the waste at its processing plant at Sitio F in the outskirts of Arica. The end products were mainly raw arsenic and iron-silver-gold oxides. The first shipment arrived in Arica in August 1984 and the processing of 500 kg test batches in October 1984 gave positive results with oversight from an official from the Chilean Health Authority in Santiago. After the sludge processing had begun at large scale and the third and last shipment of sludge arrived to Promel's plant in Arica in July 1985, contact between Boliden and Promel ceased.

In the late 1980s, Promel ceased all activities at Sitio F for unknown reasons and abandoned the remaining 10,000 tons of the highly toxic smelting sludge out in the open exposed to the elements. The area surrounding the plant was later used by the local authorities to build state-sponsored social housing aimed at low-income families. No physical barrier between the former plant and the residential area existed at the time. Residents of the new neighborhood had no knowledge about the contents of the sludge at the site, which became used as a playground by children.

In the 1990s, many residents around the former plant began to show symptoms of lead and arsenic poisoning. In 1998, the Chilean authorities ordered Promel to move the toxic waste. Promel moved the sludge to a walled area on the other side of a nearby hill and covered the material with a plastic mat. It was supposed to be a temporary storage site, yet the material remains there to this day. Cleanup of the remaining parts of Sitio F finished as late as 2010. Even after the removal of the sludge, the health effects on the local population continue to be devastating. Almost 8,000 residents were tested for toxic substances in 2010. Of the 6600 people that got results back from the Chilean Health Authority, 12.9% showed arsenic in their urine samples. Studies have found very high rates of arsenic related lung cancer, bladder cancer, kidney cancer and skin cancer in the local population. Other health effects include non-cancerous heart and lung diseases and fertility problems such as low birth weights and spontaneous miscarriages.

In 2013, 796 Arica residents, including human rights defenders, started legal action in Sweden against Boliden. The Court of Appeal for Northern Norrland held that the claims of the victims were time limited, and the Swedish Supreme Court declined to hear the case.

== Climate ==
According to the Köppen Climate Classification system, Arica has a hot desert climate, abbreviated "BWh" on climate maps. Unlike many other cities with arid climates, Arica seldom sees extreme temperatures throughout the course of the year and it is also relatively overcast. Arica is also known as the driest inhabited place on Earth, at least as measured by rainfall: average annual precipitation is 0.76 mm (0.03 inches), as measured at the airport meteorological station.

Climate data for Arica (1991–2020, extremes 1955–present)
Month	Jan	Feb	Mar	Apr	May	Jun	Jul	Aug	Sep	Oct	Nov	Dec	Year
Record high °C (°F)	33.0 (91.4)	35.2 (95.4)	34.2 (93.6)	31.3 (88.3)	29.4 (84.9)	27.8 (82.0)	27.9 (82.2)	24.8 (76.6)	30.6 (87.1)	27.0 (80.6)	30.2 (86.4)	30.2 (86.4)	35.2 (95.4)
Mean daily maximum °C (°F)	25.7 (78.3)	26.2 (79.2)	25.4 (77.7)	23.5 (74.3)	21.3 (70.3)	19.3 (66.7)	18.2 (64.8)	18.2 (64.8)	18.9 (66.0)	20.4 (68.7)	22.2 (72.0)	24.0 (75.2)	21.9 (71.4)
Daily mean °C (°F)	22.5 (72.5)	22.8 (73.0)	22.0 (71.6)	20.2 (68.4)	18.5 (65.3)	17.1 (62.8)	16.1 (61.0)	16.1 (61.0)	16.6 (61.9)	17.8 (64.0)	19.3 (66.7)	20.9 (69.6)	19.2 (66.6)
Mean daily minimum °C (°F)	19.9 (67.8)	20.2 (68.4)	19.3 (66.7)	17.4 (63.3)	16.0 (60.8)	15.2 (59.4)	14.6 (58.3)	14.8 (58.6)	15.2 (59.4)	16.1 (61.0)	17.2 (63.0)	18.4 (65.1)	17.0 (62.6)
Record low °C (°F)	7.5 (45.5)	8.0 (46.4)	10.2 (50.4)	8.4 (47.1)	6.8 (44.2)	5.8 (42.4)	6.2 (43.2)	6.2 (43.2)	6.9 (44.4)	5.6 (42.1)	7.7 (45.9)	10.7 (51.3)	5.6 (42.1)
Average precipitation mm (inches)	0.4 (0.02)	0.3 (0.01)	0.3 (0.01)	0.0 (0.0)	0.1 (0.00)	0.2 (0.01)	0.5 (0.02)	0.1 (0.00)	0.3 (0.01)	0.0 (0.0)	0.0 (0.0)	0.1 (0.00)	2.3 (0.09)
Average precipitation days (≥ 1.0 mm)	0.1	0.1	0.2	0.0	0.0	0.1	0.1	0.0	0.1	0.0	0.0	0.0	0.8
Average relative humidity (%)	66	66	67	69	71	72	72	73	72	70	68	66	69
Mean monthly sunshine hours	258.8	257.9	272.8	228.5	186.0	131.8	119.4	123.1	146.7	196.0	229.5	257.9	2,408.4
Source 1: Dirección Meteorológica de Chile
Source 2: NOAA (precipitation days 1991–2020)

== Demographics ==
Historical population
Year	Pop.	±% p.a.
1885	6,116	—
1895	4,931	−2.13%
1907	7,052	+3.03%
1920	12,463	+4.48%
1930	15,012	+1.88%
1940	16,627	+1.03%
1952	23,033	+2.75%
1970	92,523	+8.03%
1982	147,013	+3.93%
1992	169,456	+1.43%
2002	185,268	+0.90%
2017	221,364	+1.19%
2024	241,653	+1.26%
Source: INE, Memoria Chilena

As of the 2024 census, the population is 241,653, of which 49.2% are male and 50.8% are female. People under 15 years old make up 19.7% of the population, and people over 65 years old make up 12.7%. 91.1% of the population is urban and 8.9% is rural. Arica is home to 98.8% of the region's population.

The population of Arica is made up of various long-established groups in the region, and other more recent arrivals settled at differing times. Among the long-established groups, the oldest consists of indigenous Amerindians, such as the Aymara, whose presence in the region is of several millennia. These are followed by the second oldest, the local colonial-era groups, which includes local mestizos (of mixed Spanish-Amerindian origin), local criollos (whites of colonial Spanish origin), and local afrodescendants of colonial-era slaves. The third oldest group consists of early post-colonial Chinese Chileans who first arrived as miners and rail workers in the 1890s.

These long-established groups of Ariqueños have been augmented by various later settlers, mostly other criollos and mestizo Chileans from elsewhere around Chile, but also numerous Europeans, who arrived in the 1900s, including more Spaniards arriving from Spain, as well as Italians, Greeks, British, and French. These arrived at different times during the last century.

Some Ariqueños, primarily the indigenous Amerindians, but also the afro-descendants, share cultural affinities to counterpart populations in neighbouring border areas of Peru, and more distantly, Bolivia.

The urban area of Arica has 209,981 inhabitants in an area of 38.03 square kilometres (14.68 sq mi). The growing city of Arica spreads outward into the desert and the Peru-Chile border. The Azapa Valley has developed a year-round agricultural economy due to improvements in irrigation and transportation of its products.

The villages that make up the commune are Villa Frontera and San Miguel de Azapa. Some hamlets are Poconchile, Molinas, Sora, Las Maitas and Caleta Vitor.

The commune of Arica is composed of 19 census districts.

Census districts of the Arica commune
#	District	Area (km^{2})	2002 Population
1	Puerto	1.2	2,744
2	Regiment	0.7	3,880
3	Chinchorro	13.3	12,816
4	San José	1.2	13,216
5	Población Chile	17.3	9,086
6	Azapa	1,937.8	14,991
7	José Manuel Balmaceda	2.7	11,984
8	Carlos Dittborn	2.1	10,525
9	Lauca Park	0.4	4,934
10	José Miguel Carrera	0.6	5,836
11	Condell	0.5	6,358
12	Strong Citadel	215.9	28,209
13	Chaca	794.0	223
14	El Morro	0.9	3,286
15	Chacalluta	419.3	1,684
16	Molinos	1,376.0	649
17	Pedro Blanqui	7.3	25,131
18	Cancharayada	5.3	17,530
19	Las Torres	2.9	11,878
–	stragglers		308
	Total	4,799.4	185,268

Source: INE 2007 report, "Territorial division of Chile"

=== Immigration ===
As of the 2024 census, immigrants make up 14.7% of the population - 14.4% are from South America, 0.2% from North America, 0.1% from Europe, 0.03% from Asia, 0.004% from Africa, and 0.004% from Oceania.

== Administration ==
As a commune, Arica is a third-level administrative division of Chile administered by a municipal council, headed by an alcalde who is directly elected every four years. The 2008–2012 alcalde is Waldo Sankán Martínez (Independent).

Within the electoral divisions of Chile, Arica is represented in the Chamber of Deputies by Mr. Vlado Mirosevic (Partido Liberal) and Mr. Luis Rocaful as part of the 1st electoral district, which includes the entire Arica and Parinacota Region. The commune is represented in the Senate by José Miguel Insulza (PS, 2018–2026) and José Durana (UDI, 2018–2026) as part of the 1st senatorial constituency (Arica and Parinacota Region and Tarapacá Region).

== Sights ==
The Morro de Arica is a tall, nearly-vertical rock formation and hill located in the city, situated approximately 139 meters above sea level. It was the last bulwark of defense for the Peruvian troops who garrisoned the city. It was attacked and captured on 7 June 1880 by Chilean troops, as the final effort of their Campaña del Desierto (Desert Campaign) during the War of the Pacific.

Near to the city center is the Azapa Valley, an oasis where vegetables and, famously, Azapa olives are grown. Economically, it is also an important port for Chilean ore. The semi-tropical latitude, combined with the low humidity and the city's beaches, have made Arica a popular tourist destination. It is also a center of Chilean rail networks with Bolivia. For air travel, the region is serviced by Chacalluta International Airport.

Catedral de San Marcos de Arica is a magnificent church designed by Gustave Eiffel was built in the 1870s.

Plaza Colón is the civic heart of the city, the public square is where its residents congregate for celebrations, diversions or simply being a part of the community.

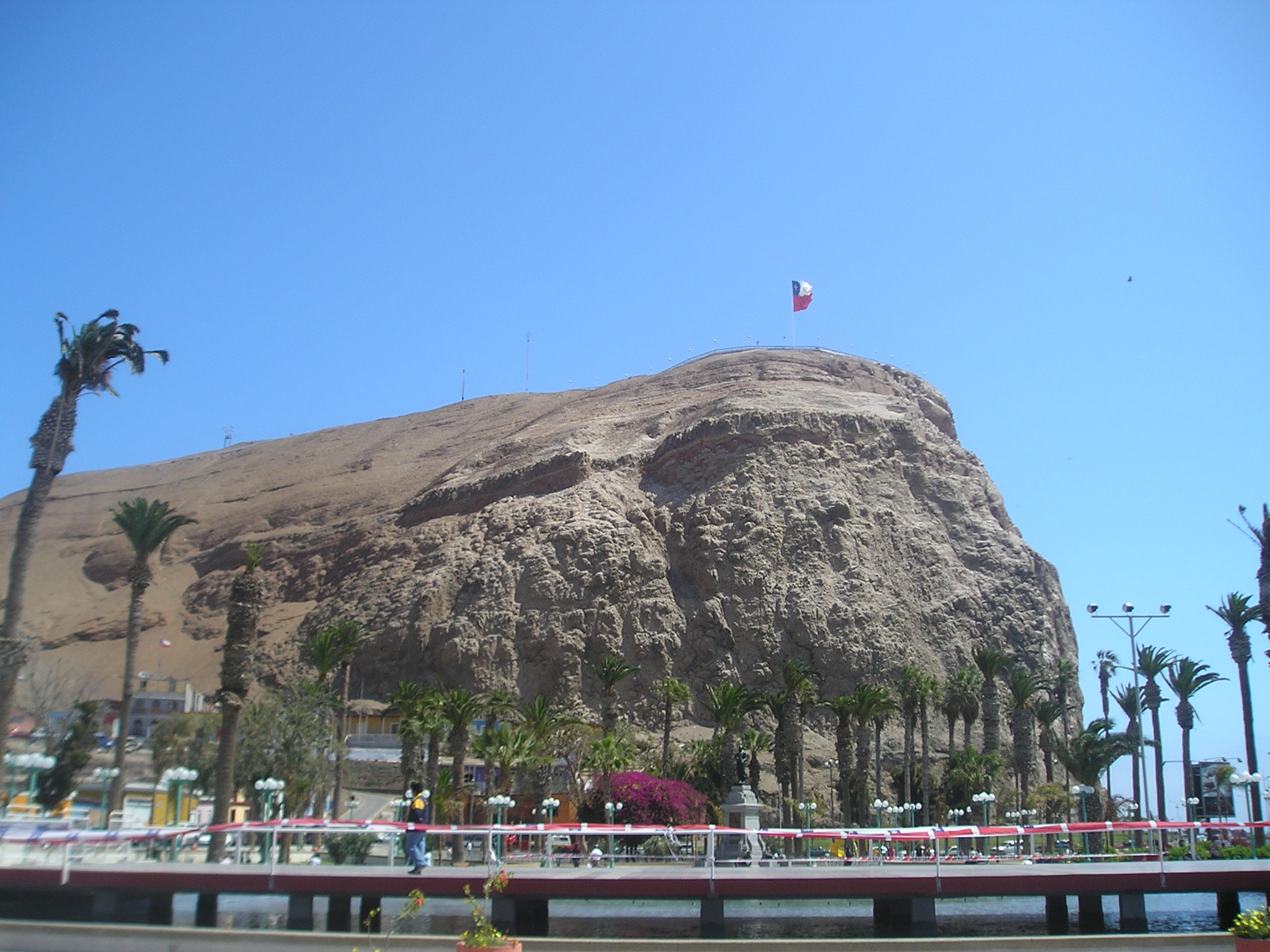
Morro de Arica

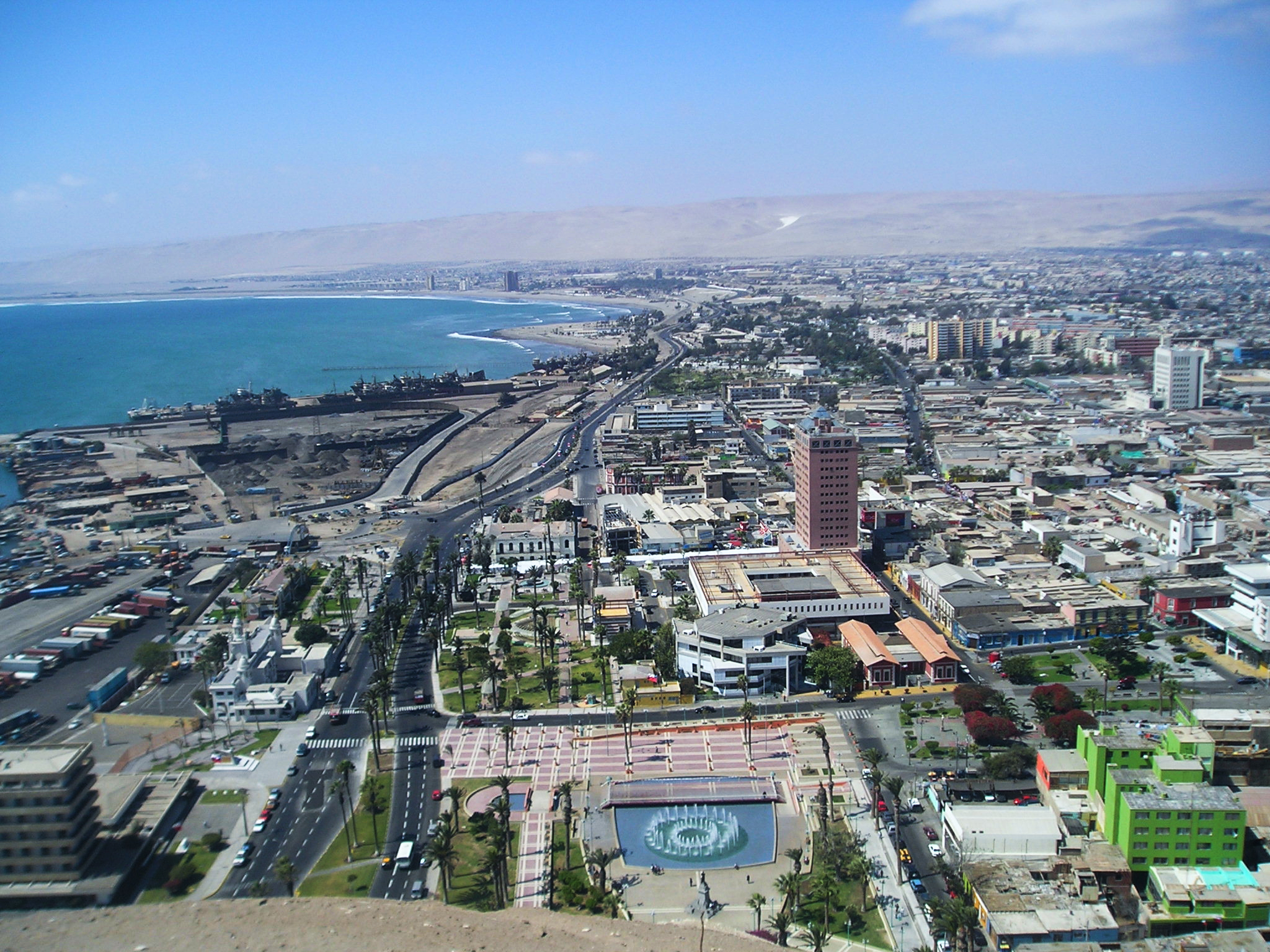
The city view from Morro de Arica

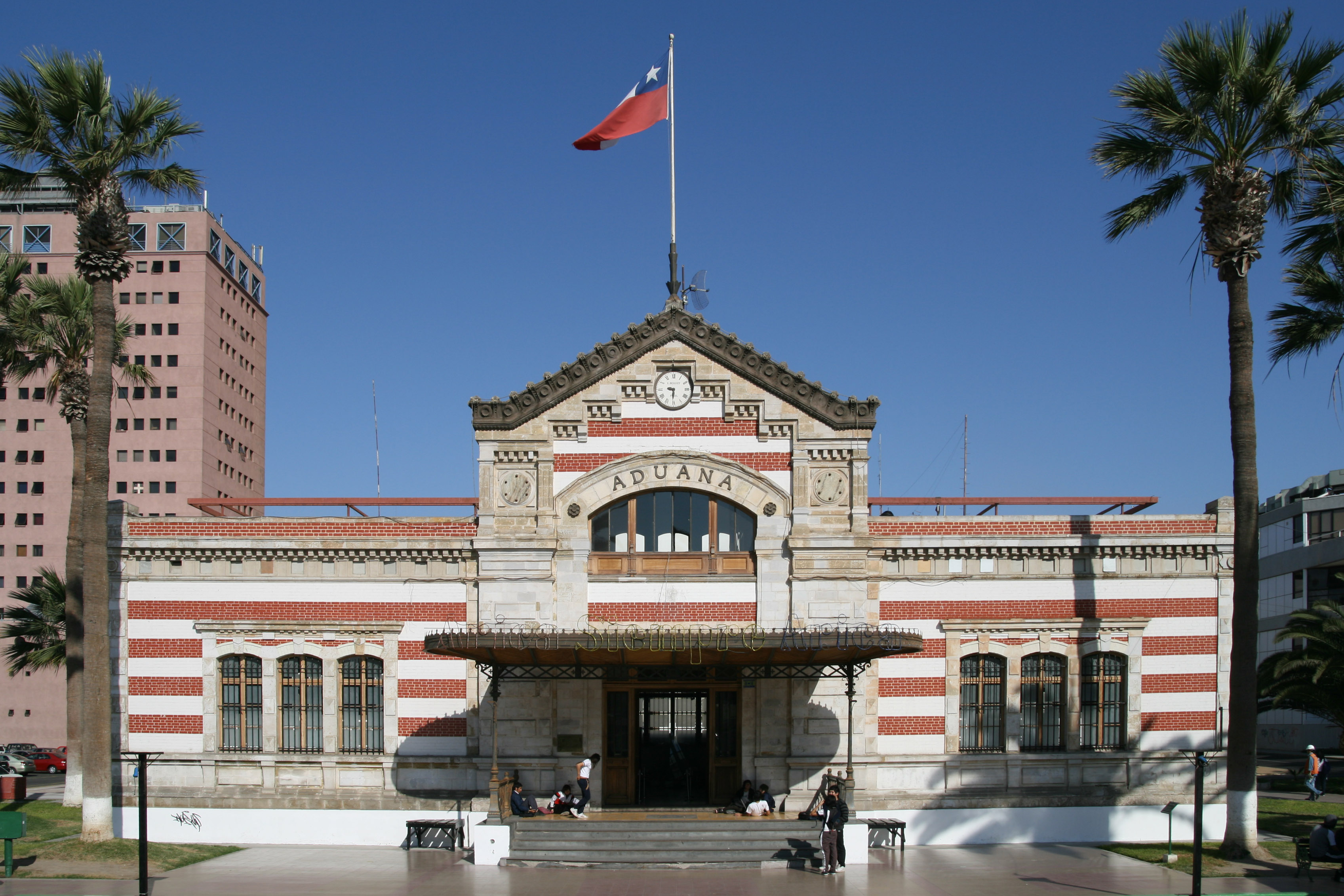
Arica's Customs Office (Aduana de Arica), built by the Peruvian Government after the 1868 earthquake.

Other attractions include the former house of the Governor, the Former Arica Custom House, railway station Arica-La Paz, the Archaeological and Anthropological Museum of San Miguel de Azapa, Sea and Historical Arms and Arica. For evening entertainment there is the Casino de Arica.

=== Beaches ===
More than 20 kilometres (12 mi) of beaches, many known for the quality of surfing, span across the Coastal Range in the northern sector. The harbored location makes these beaches unique from other cities in Chile in terms of topography.

From north to south the beaches are located Las Machas, Chinchorro, del Alacrán, El Laucho, La Lisera, Brava, Arenillas Negras, La Capilla, Corazones and La Liserilla.

=== Other tourist sites ===
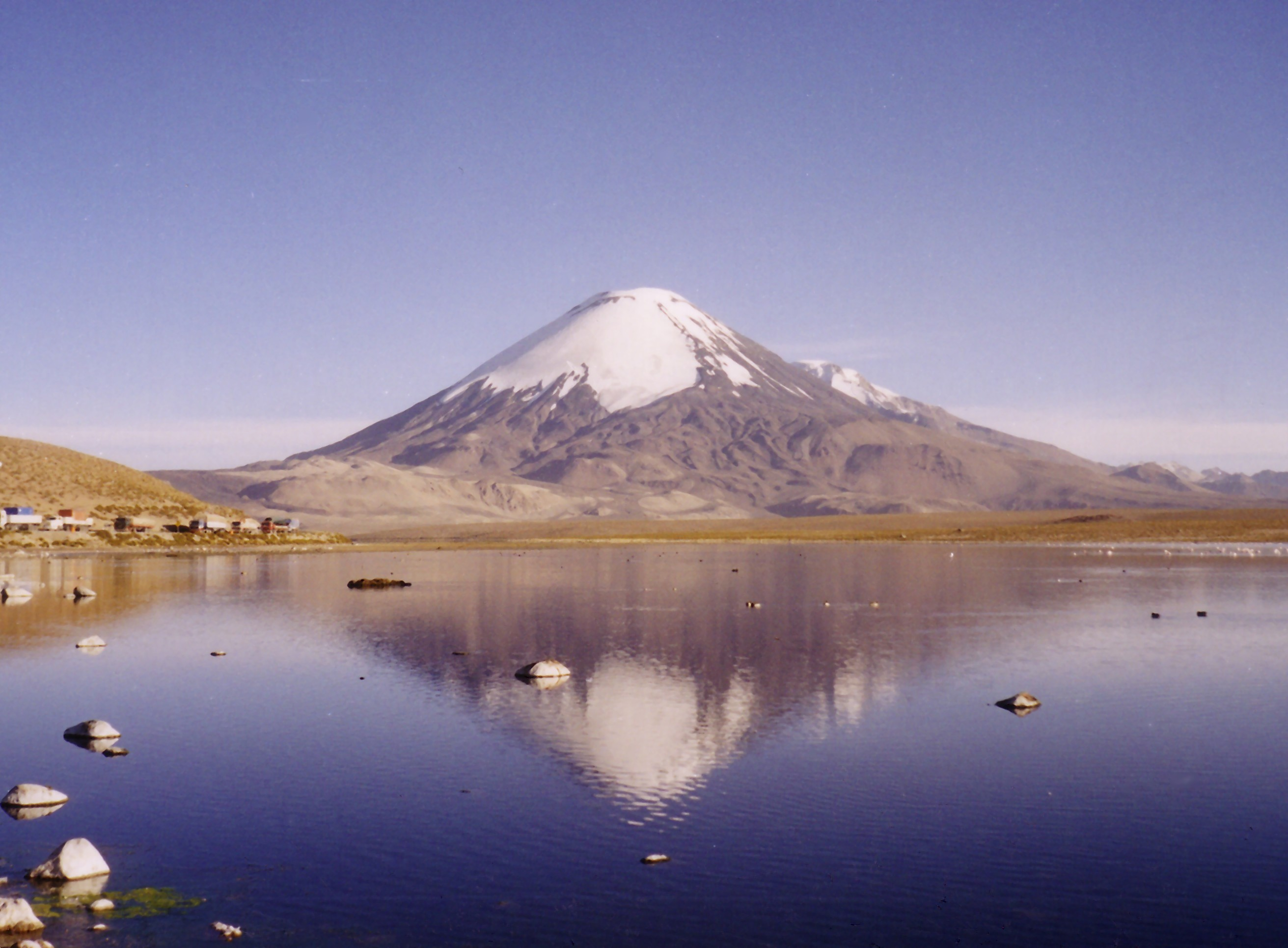
Chungará Lake

- Chungará Lake: Arica is the main access road to the lake, the 29th highest in the world (and the 10th highest in South America), with an approximate height of 4517 metres. It is located within the Lauca National Park.
- Pucará de Copaquilla: about 3,000 metres above sea level, dates from the 12th century, declared National Monument, located on a promontory that serves as the defence has a double stone wall, which protects a series of internal spaces. From this point it is possible to observe the pre-and streams.
- Termas de Jurasi a few miles southeast of Putre, by Ruta 11-CH, turning off a dirt road. Underground waters are home to temperatures above 40 °C (104 °F) which are reputed to have medicinal properties.
- Surf Arica is a world-famous spot for surfing. The wave known as "El Gringo" hosts surfing and bodyboarding world championships every year. In 2007, Arica was the site for an ASP world tour contest. Others stops on this tour include Hawaii, Tahiti, Fiji and South Africa.

== Economy ==
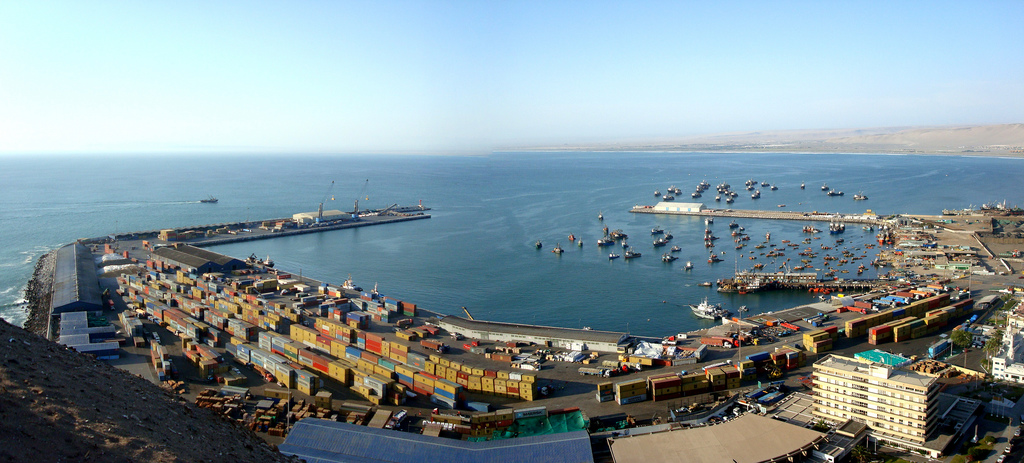
Panoramic view of the Port of Arica.

Near Arica lies the Azapa Valley, an oasis in the Atacama Desert where vegetables, olive trees, and citrus fruits are cultivated. The city experienced a relative boom during the nitrate cycle. When that cycle ended, the Chilean government promoted urban development through the creation of an industrial and commercial free-trade zone in 1953, which became notable for its automotive industry.

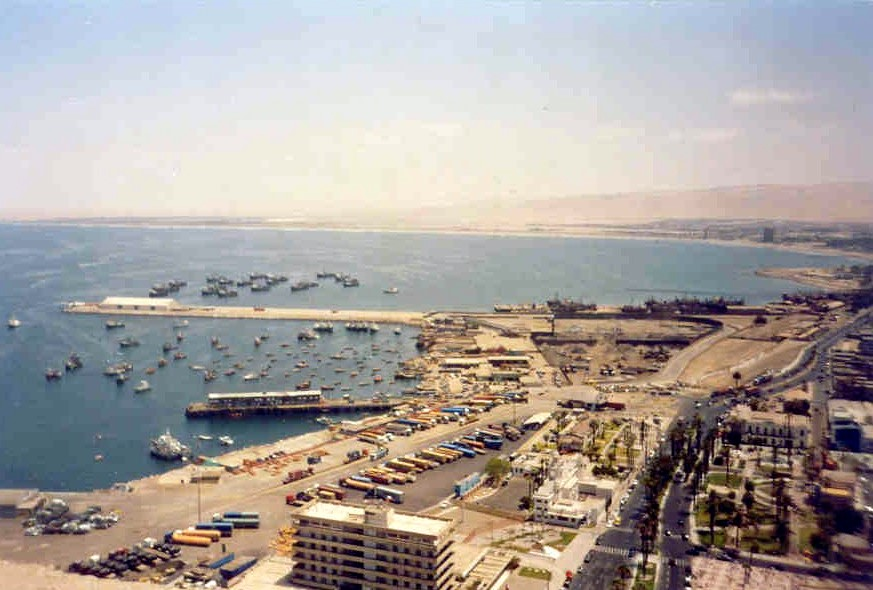
Port or Port Terminal of Arica, in 2006.

In addition, Arica is an important archaeological and anthropological center, home to the oldest mummies in the world. It features petroglyphs, geoglyphs, and a vast collection of handicrafts and cultural artifacts spanning more than 10,000 years of history, belonging to pre-Incaic Andean and coastal cultures.

Arica is also a seaside resort, with a casino, beaches, and a port frequently visited by cruise ships. Its tropical latitude, combined with its arid and sunny climate, make it an attractive tourist destination. The city also serves as a hub for railway and road communications with Bolivia and Peru, and it is served by the Chacalluta International Airport, which connects it by air with southern Peru, western Bolivia, and the rest of Chile.

=== Industry ===
The Arica Industrial Park, or "Gateway to the Americas," originally planned along the Pan-American Highway Route 5, Arica–La Serena section, north of the city, is now practically encompassed within the urban area. Notable for its large size, it offers excellent transportation links such as Route 5 (Pan-American Highway) and the newly extended Capitán Ávalos Avenue (ring road), which directly connects to international highways leading to Peru and Bolivia (the bioceanic corridor), as well as to those heading south toward central Chile.

Another industrial park, located near the Chacalluta International Airport, close to the Peru border and customs checkpoints, is the Parque Industrial Chacalluta, managed by the Iquique Free Trade Zone (ZOFRI) company.

== Transport ==
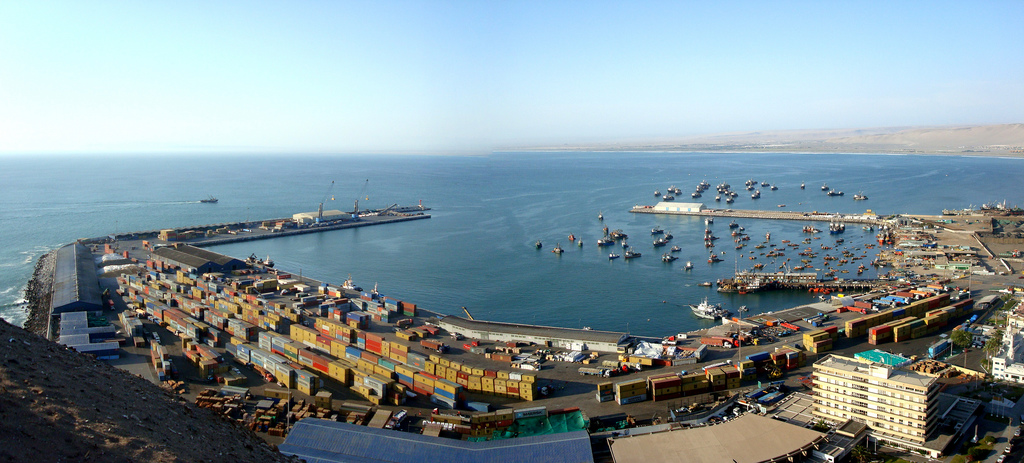
The port of Arica.

Passenger train services on the Arica–La Paz railway ceased in 1996, but as of 2017 there were proposals to restart services from Arica as a tourist attraction (and for freight).

In 2011, Chile announced plans to privatise the Port of Arica. These were opposed by Bolivia, as Arica is its main sea port.

Chacalluta International Airport is the main airport in Arica and is located 18.5 km north of the city. LATAM Chile, Amaszonas, JetSmart, and Sky Airline have scheduled commercial service to several Chilean airports.

== Sports ==
Arica was one of the four host cities of the 1962 FIFA World Cup, and it was the venue for a Rip Curl Pro Search surfing event that took place from June 20 to July 1, 2007. Arica plays host to a leg of the International Bodyboarding Association's world tour event every year at the notorious "el flops" surf break. The event has been running since 2004.

== International relations ==
Arica hosts various institutions dedicated to international relations. Among them, the Regional Unit for International Affairs (URAI) of the Regional Government of Arica and Parinacota stands out; it is responsible for analyzing and managing the region's bilateral and multilateral relations with Peru, Bolivia, Latin America, and the rest of the world. The Regional Council's Commission on International Relations also plays a role, along with governmental entities such as the regional office of the National Migration Service, the regional branch of the General Directorate for Export Promotion (ProChile), and the Arica and Parinacota Migration and International Police Prefecture of the Investigations Police of Chile. Furthermore, the Migrant Office of the Arica Municipality provides support to the city's migrant population.

In the field of higher education internationalization, the main institution in Arica is the Directorate of Interinstitutional and International Relations of the University of Tarapacá, responsible for academic cooperation and student mobility at the global level.

Arica has strong ties with the city of Tacna, Peru. Many people cross the border daily as they travel between the two cities, partially due to the many services (for example, dentists, doctors, etc.) that are cheaper in Peru. Arica is connected to both Tacna and to La Paz via separate railroad lines.

=== Consulates ===
- Germany (Honorary Consulate)
- Austria (Honorary Consulate)
- Belgium (Honorary Consulate)
- Bolivia (Consulate General)
- Denmark (Honorary Consulate)
- Ecuador (Honorary Consulate)
- Spain (Honorary Consulate)
- Hungary (Honorary Consulate)
- Italy (Honorary Vice-Consulate)
- Peru (Consulate General)
- United Kingdom (Honorary Consulate)

== Notable people ==
- Jean-François Dauxion-Lavaysse, a Frenchman, born in 1770 or 1775, died on 8 July 1829 in Arica. He was the first director of the Chilean National Museum of Natural History and the Botanical Garden.
- Dante Poli – former footballer
- Hipólito Unanue – physician, and briefly President of Peru
- Izkia Siches, former Vice president and minister of the interior of Chile.
- Américo – singer
- Chañaral Ortega-Miranda (b. 1973) – classical composer
