= The Trip to Panama =

2006 German film

- Theatrical release poster
- Directed by: Martin Otevrel
- Written by: Guido Schmelich
- Based on: The Trip to Panama by Janosch
- Produced by: Irina Probost
- Starring: Til Schweiger; Dietmar Bär; Anke Engelke; Ralf Schmitz; Mirco Nontschew; Friedrich Schoenfelder
- Edited by: Sascha Wolff
- Music by: Annette Focks
- Production companies: Papa Löwe Filmproduktion; Warner Bros. Film Productions Germany; MABO Pictures Filmproduktion; Rothkirch Cartoon-Film
- Distributed by: Warner Bros. Pictures
- Release date: 21 September 2006
- Running time: 73 minutes
- Country: Germany
- Language: German
- Box office: $2.7 million

The Trip to Panama (German: Oh, wie schön ist Panama) is a 2006 German film directed by Martin Otevrel, based on the children's book by Janosch. The film stars Til Schweiger and Dietmar Bär.

The film was released in Germany on 21 September 2006 by Warner Bros. Pictures under their Family Entertainment label.

== Voice cast ==
- Til Schweiger as Kleiner Tiger
- Dietmar Bär as Kleiner Bär
- Anke Engelke as Fisch
- Ralf Schmitz as Kobold Schnuddel
- Mirco Nontschew as Reiseesel
- Friedrich Schoenfelder as Paradiesvogel

== Release ==
The film was released on DVD on 23 February 2007 by Warner Home Video.
