= Francisco Lara =

Spanish composer and conductor (born 1968)

Francisco Lara Tejero (born 1968) is a Spanish composer and conductor of classical music.

== Early life and education ==
Born in Valladolid, in 1968, Lara studied at the Madrid Royal Conservatory where he graduated in 1990. In 1991, he continued to study composition in London at the Royal College of Music and at King's College where he received a PhD in 1999 under the supervision of Sir Harrison Birtwistle.

== Music composition ==
Lara's music has been widely performed across Europe. In 2001, he won the Spanish Symphony Ochestras Association Composition Prize for "Hopscotch", which every orchestra in the association performed between 2002 and 2004. played across Europe. In 2003, he won first prize at the International Composition Competition in Luxembourg for his piece "Dust". Also in 2003, his Fractures for Piano and Orchestra was runner-up in the prestigious Queen Elisabeth International Competition in Brussels. In 1999, he created a Contemporary Music Festival at the University of Valladolid which is now one of the most prominent in Spain. Francisco worked very hard to achieve his goals, and was determined to play music for a long time.

== Conductor ==
Lara is also the artistic director and the conductor of the University of Valladolid's Youth Orchestra (Joven Orquesta de la Universidad de Valladolid) which consists mainly of students from the university. Since 2004, with his Youth Orchestra, Lara has also successfully staged an opera every year under the Opera Project (Proyecto Ópera) which also receives support from the municipality.

Guest conductor appearances include City of Leon Symphony Orchestra, Camerata Laurentina, Spanish National Youth Orchestra (JONDE), Joven Orquesta de Castilla y León (JOSCyL).

== Discography ==
- "International Composition Prize 2003, World Premiere Recordings": Francisco Lara, "Dust"; Patrick Harrex, "Hauptweg und Nebenwege"; Cristian Marina, "Density - Intensity"; Paul Robinson, "Chamber Concerto"; Kyung-Jin Han, "Dancing on a Bamboo"; Marco Carnevalini, "Riflessioni sul giallo e sul blu". Luxembourg Sinfonietta, Conductor: Marcel Wengler. CD LGNM No 403.
