= Marcel Wengler =

Luxembourgish composer and conductor (born 1946)

Marcel Wengler (born 20 April 1946) is a Luxembourgish composer and conductor. From 1972–1997, he headed the Conservatoire de Luxembourg. Since 2000, he has been director of the Luxembourg Music Information Centre. His compositions include symphonies, concertos, chamber music and musicals.

== Early life and education ==
Born in Esch-sur-Alzette, Wengler studied at the Conservatoire Royal de Musique in Brussels and at the Musikhochschule in Cologne. Igor Markevitch and Sergiu Celibidache were his mentors during his conducting studies.

== Career ==
As a conductor, Wengler has worked across Europe with a variety of radio companies, recording over a hundred works. With the RTL Symphony Orchestra, he has recorded a series of CDs covering works by Luxembourgish composers.

Wengler has composed around 80 works, including symphonies and concertos as well as a stage, chamber and ballet music. In 1983, he wrote the music for Volker Schlöndorff's film Swann in Love with the Munich Philharmonic. His musical, Rex Leo (1986), has been staged both in Luxembourg and Graz. In 1995, he conducted the first performance of his Cello Concerto with the Portuguese National Symphony Orchestra in Lisbon and, in 1997, his Viola Concerto with Garth Knox and the Nuremberg Symphony Orchestra. His Violin Concerto (1997) was performed during the World Music Days in Romania and he conducted the première of his Flute Concerto (1999) with the Orquestra Nacional do Porto. His compositional style was initially influenced by Beethoven and Mahler and later by Karl Amadeus Hartmann and Hans Werner Henze.

Marcel Wengler is the President of the Luxembourg Society for Contemporary Music (LSCM), founded in 1983, where he has done much to promote Luxembourg composers who would otherwise have little chance of having their music performed in their native country. One of the achievements of the LSCM was the formation of the Luxembourg Sinfonietta ensemble which he has directed since it was founded in 1999. Since 2000, he has been director of the Luxembourg Music Information Centre which publishes catalogues of Luxembourgish compositions and participates in building up an international databank of new music.

== Awards ==
- 1978: first prize, International Conductors’ Competition, Rio de Janeiro

== Selected works ==
Stage

- Rex Leo, Musical (1986)

Orchestra

- Sinfonietta (1976)
- Konstellationen (1980)
- Symphony No. 2 (1982)
- Versuche über einen Marsch (1984, 1995); original version for symphonic band
- Antarctica Project, Music from the documentary film for string orchestra (1986, 1988)
- Diaporama (1989)
- The Answered Question (1997)

Band

- Sinfonietta (1976)
- Versuche über einen Marsch (1984)
- European Rhapsody (1990)
- Horse Parade: Marche des petits princes (1999)

Concertante

- Concerto for harpsichord and chamber orchestra (1972)
- Antiphonie for solo trumpet, timpani and 10 brass instruments (1983)
- Concerto for oboe and string orchestra (1984)
- Novellette for also saxophone and string orchestra (1991)
- Concerto for cello and orchestra (1995)
- Concerto for viola and orchestra (1997)
- Concerto for violin and orchestra (1997)
- Concerto for flute and orchestra (1999)

Chamber music

- String Quintet for 2 violins, viola, cello and double bass (1973)
- La crique: Musique de scène for flute, clarinet, violin and cello and piano (1978)
- Sonata a tre for violin, clarinet and piano (1981)
- Nach Mitternacht for harp solo (1982)
- Divertimento a 11 for flute, clarinet, bass clarinet, saxophone, horn, trumpet, trombone, piano, percussion, violin and cello (1982)
- Bakxai for percussion ensemble (1983)
- Elegie for trumpet and organ (1985)
- Quartetto for 2 violins, cello and harpsichord (1985)
- Die Pest in Brühl: Trauer Marsch for chamber ensemble (1985)
- Ständchen (Serenade) for trumpet and guitar (1986)
- Batuque for percussion ensemble (1986)
- Marche des Capucins for flute, clarinet, alto saxophone, trumpet, trombone, cello, piano and percussion (1986)
- Ballade for brass quintet (1986)
- Tango für vier for 4 clarinets (1998)
- Fanfare noble et sentimentale for brass quintet (1991)
- String Trio (1992)
- Piano Trio (1995)
- Faux Pas de Deux for flute and harp (1996)
- Peärls Quartet for flute, violin, cello and piano (1998)
- Shadows for 4 saxophones and accordion (2000)
- Pas de trois for violin, accordion and didgeridoo (2000)

Piano

- Nachtstück (1982)

Vocal

- Die Weisse Wildnis for baritone and orchestra (1982)
- Rimbaud Lieder for baritone, bass flute, guitar, cello, double bass and percussion (1984); words by Arthur Rimbaud
- Der Adler for mezzo-soprano and piano (1999); words by Hans Arp
- Le chant des Léonides, Vocalise for soprano and ensemble (1999)
- Der unbekannte Engel for soprano and chamber ensemble (2000)
- Das Karussell for soprano and 14 instruments (2001)

Film scores

- Swann in Love (1984)
- Stammheim (1986)
- Antarctica Project, Documentary (1986)
- Mumm Sweet Mumm (1989)
- Blue Eyed (1989)
- Schacko Klack (1989)
- Dammentour (1992)
