= El último cartucho =

Painting by Juan Lepiani

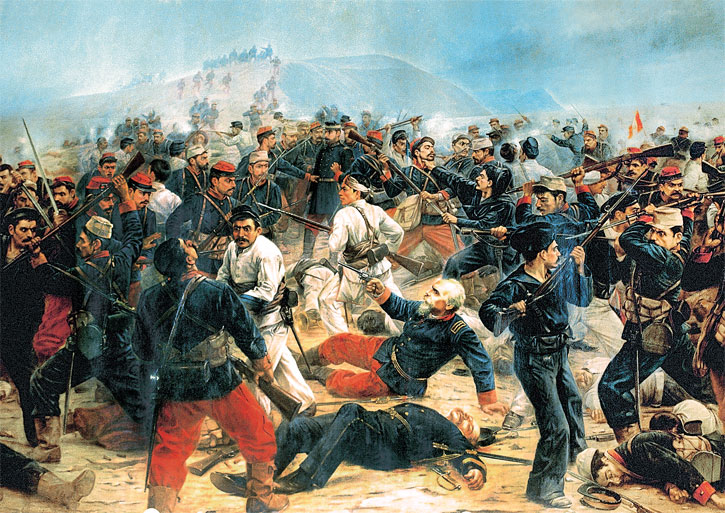
- Artist: Juan Lepiani
- Year: 1899
- Medium: Oil on canvas
- Subject: Battle of Arica
- Dimensions: 294 cm × 490 cm (116 in × 190 in)
- Location: Casa Bolognesi, Lima

El último cartucho (Spanish for "The Last Cartridge") is an 1899 oil painting by Peruvian painter Juan Lepiani. It forms part of the collection of the Combatants of the Morro de Arica Museum.

== Context ==
The painting depicts a chapter of the War of the Pacific, where the armies of Chile and Peru fought in the battle of Arica, where Francisco Bolognesi, commander of the Peruvian Army, was killed in action. Bolognesi's rejection of a surrender, which preceded the battle, is depicted in Lepiani's 1891 painting La respuesta.

The painting process carried out by Lepiani involved him travelling to the Rock of Arica to take photographs and notes of the area, exhume bodies and to speak with former soldiers and local Peruvians. It was first shown on that same year at the Casa Dubois, located at the corners of Jirón de la Unión and Jirón Moquegua in Lima. Then president Eduardo López de Romaña was impressed by the work, and ordered that it be used at schools to teach about the event.

== See also ==
- Battle of Arica
- La respuesta (painting)
- Casa Bolognesi
