= Gloria del Pacífico =

- Theatrical release poster
- Directed by: Juan Carlos Oganes
- Written by: Juan Carlos Oganes
- Produced by: Juan Carlos Oganes
- Starring: Reynaldo Arenas; Carlos Vertiz; Gustavo Mac Lennan; Lilian Nieto; Pold Gastello; Juan Manuel Ochoa; Paloma Yerovi
- Cinematography: Juan Carlos Oganes
- Edited by: Juan Carlos Oganes; Calin Romero
- Music by: Micky Tejada
- Production company: Emporium Digital Studios
- Distributed by: Emporium Digital Studios
- Release date: November 6, 2014
- Running time: 150 minutes
- Country: Peru
- Language: Spanish
- Budget: $200,000
- Box office: $68,294

Gloria del Pacífico (lit. 'Glory of the Pacific') is a 2014 Peruvian epic war historical drama film written, directed and produced by Juan Carlos Oganes as his twelfth film. Starring Reynaldo Arenas, Carlos Vertiz, Gustavo Mac Lennan, Lilian Nieto, Pold Gastello, Juan Manuel Ochoa and Paloma Yerovi. It is the first part of a trilogy about what happened during the War of the Pacific between Peru and Chile, which occurred in 1879 and 1883. The film premiered on November 6, 2014, in Peruvian theaters.

== Plot ==
After the events of the Battle at Alto de la Alianza, Peruvian Colonel Francisco Bolognesi (Carlos Vértiz) gathers his officers to decide the course of action after receiving no news or new orders from his superiors. Chilean General Manuel Baquedano (Gustavo Mac Lennan) prepares the strategy for the capture of Morro de Arica, the last Peruvian stronghold that defends the province of Arica and that has 1,900 men against the invasion of 10,000 Chileans. A surviving veteran in Tacna in 1929 (Reynaldo Arenas), already sick in bed, relives his experience in his last moments, revealing many secrets and mysteries that history never told. Parallel stories are also told, such as that of Alfonso Ugarte (Fernando Petong) and his personal sacrifice as an assimilated civilian, and of desertions and betrayals that occurred on both sides.

== Cast ==
The main cast of the film is:

- Gustavo Mac Lennan as Manuel Baquedano
- Reynaldo Arenas as Vicente
- Fernando Petong as Alfonso Ugarte
- Carlos Vertiz as Francisco Bolognesi
- Juan Manuel Ochoa as Agustín Belaunde
- Lilian Nieto as Rosa Vernal
- Patricio Villavicencio as José de la Cruz Salvo
- Pold Gastello as Juan Diego
- Paloma Yerovi as Timotea Vernal
- André Silva as Corporal Alfredo Maldonado

== Production ==
=== Script ===
The inspiration of the director Juan Carlos Oganes to write the film came from watching in his childhood a series made by the State in 1979 for the centenary of the war called "Nuestros Héroes de la Guerra del Pacífico" (Our Heroes of the Pacific War). In 2004, he started historical research for 6 years.

=== Financing ===
In 2009, Juan Carlos Oganes did not get investment from any private company, so he decided to sell his entire company (Emporium Digital Studios) for $150,000 to finance the film. The final budget reached $200,000.

=== Filming ===
Pre-production began in 2009 and principal photography began on November 16, 2010, and culminating in April 2013. It was filmed in the Rímac pampas, the historic center of Lima, the Morro Solar in Chorrillos, Ancón, San Bartolo, Barranco and Tacna. 700 uniforms for Peruvian, Chilean and Bolivian soldiers had to be made, as well as accessories and utensils for soldiers and officers to be used by 600 actors and extras.

== Reception ==
=== Critical reception ===
Jorge Millones from Daniel Mathews' blog from LaMula.pe, says: "Gloria del Pacífico is an uncomfortable and necessary film... I don't know if Juan Carlos Oganes is aware of what he has achieved with this film, for me, after almost 150 years, it is the flag of Alfonso Ugarte that Oganes decided to raise from the ground." Journalist and Critic Alonso Almenara of LaMula.pe says in his article about the film Feelings of superiority or inferiority must disappear: "There are in Juan Carlos Oganes a series of details that do not stop reminding me of the character of Fitzcarraldo, the protagonist of that famous film by German filmmaker Werner Herzog, recorded in the Amazon, between Brazil and Peru, Fitzcarraldo is the story of a personal project of excessive ambition: an eccentric businessman (a real figure) decides to build an opera house in a Peruvian town On the banks of the Amazon, his extravagant plan requires nothing less than taking a large boat out of the river and transporting it to the top of a mountain. Oganes is now involved in an adventure of similar dimensions: telling the story of the War of the Pacific, which he faced at the end of the 19th century to the nations of Chile, Bolivia and Peru. It is the first large-scale production of national epic cinema."

=== Box-office ===
Gloria del Pacífico grossed US$68,294 during the seven weeks it was in Peruvian theaters.

== Controversy ==
Gloria del Pacífico, despite its great demand, received little support from commercial cinema chains, being released in a few theaters and gradually limited despite its fed up attendance, causing great surprise and annoyance to the public due to the complex schedules and inadequate to which it was subjected, reaching the public to accuse the cinema chains of boycott and foreign black hand, being its Director many times interviewed on radio and TV due to this to know their impressions. “Yesterday the Hunger Games premiered in 252 rooms, whereas I am in 6 and I have brought almost the same number of viewers in proportion per room; Despite this, I am in the top 10 of the most viewed”, said Oganes in conversation with Mariella Patriau. "If the film was bad, it had bad actors or it had been directed badly or in an amateurish way, take me out for good reason. But if it's the opposite, people pack the rooms, it has a great cast of actors, well-achieved scenes, people applaud and cry at the end of each performance, tickets are sold out, there are long queues, etc.; why don't they give me more rooms?- he narrowed.

== Future ==
Gloria del Pacífico is the first part of a trilogy that covers the entire War of the Pacific, whose second part (in pre-production) will cover the capture of Lima in the battles of San Juan and Miraflores, connecting with the deed of Andrés Avelino Cáceres in the Brena. The third part is a prequel that addresses the life and deeds of Admiral Miguel Grau. Currently, the filming of Gloria del Pacífico 2 could start in mid-2023.
