= Mariano Bustamante =

Mariano Emilio Bustamante
- Born: August 5, 1831; Tingo, Arequipa, Arequipa, Peru
- Died: June 7, 1880 (aged 48); Arica, Peru

Mariano Emilio Bustamante y Mantilla (August 5, 1831 – June 7, 1880) was a Peruvian hero of the War of the Pacific between Chile and Peru, fighting in the battles of San Francisco, Tarapacá and Arica, in which he was killed while combating.

He was born in the town of Tingo, near the city of Arequipa, Peru. He joined the army to fight as a colonel during the war, he died on June 7, 1880, during the Battle of Arica along with 50% of the men that defended Arica. He was the Chief of Detail for Colonel Alfonso Ugarte under the garrison commanded by Colonel Francisco Bolognesi.

He was one of the Peruvian officers who, on the eve of the battle, had gallantly rejected an offer to surrender the garrison to the Chilean army, and prompted Colonel Bolognesi to vow to the Chilean emissary that he would defend the garrison to the last cartridge.

A barracks in the Mariano Melgar District, in the city of Arequipa, are named after him.
