= Combatants of the Morro de Arica Museum =

Museum in Peru

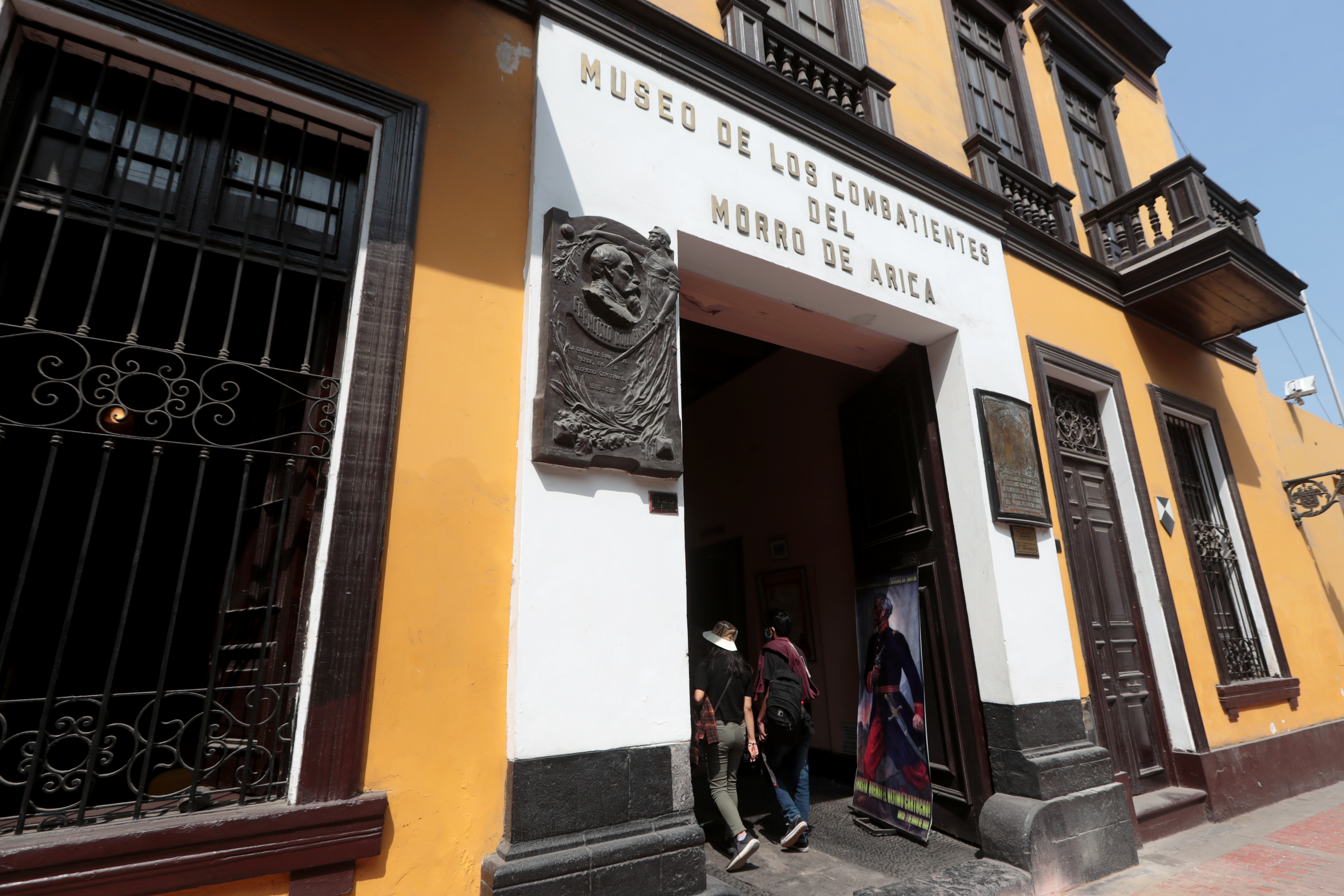
- Interactive map of the Combatants of the Morro de Arica Museum area

General information
- Architectural style: Spanish Colonial
- Location: Jirón Cailloma 125
- Coordinates: 12°02′40″S 77°01′58″W
- Inaugurated: June 7, 1975 (Museum)

The Combatants of the Morro de Arica Museum (Spanish: Museo de los Combatientes del Morro de Arica), also known as the Casa de Bolognesi, is a house museum dedicated to the War of the Pacific and its battle of Arica, located at the birthplace of Francisco Bolognesi, in the historic centre of Lima, Peru.

== History ==
The museum was installed in the house where Colonel Francisco Bolognesi, killed in action during the Battle of Arica (1880), was born in 1816. The mansion, declared a national monument on January 29, 1962, was restored under the military government of Juan Velasco Alvarado, inaugurated on June 7, 1975, by then War Minister Francisco Morales Bermúdez in a ceremony assisted by the descendants of those who fought during the battle. Its interior restoration was carried out by the architect Alfonso Estremadoyro, who restored its colonial appearance, but not the façade, whose restoration was in charge of the National Institute of Culture. In 2016 the museum was restored again as well as many pieces from its collection, such as military suits and handwritten letters from Bolognesi.

== Collection ==
The museum is divided into 12 thematic rooms. Among the most notable pieces in the collection are the paintings La respuesta and El último cartucho by Juan Lepiani, and the Peruvian flag that flew on the Morro de Arica before it became Chilean territory. The flag had been buried by lieutenant Emilio de los Ríos, of the Iquique Battalion, and recovered by a local woman, who delivered it to the Sociedad de Sobrevivientes de Arica.

== See also ==
- Alto de la Alianza Museum
- Casa Bolognesi
- Museum of the War of the Pacific
