= Friendship Park (Lima) =

Park in Lima, Peru

Coordinates: 12°07′54″S 76°58′54″W

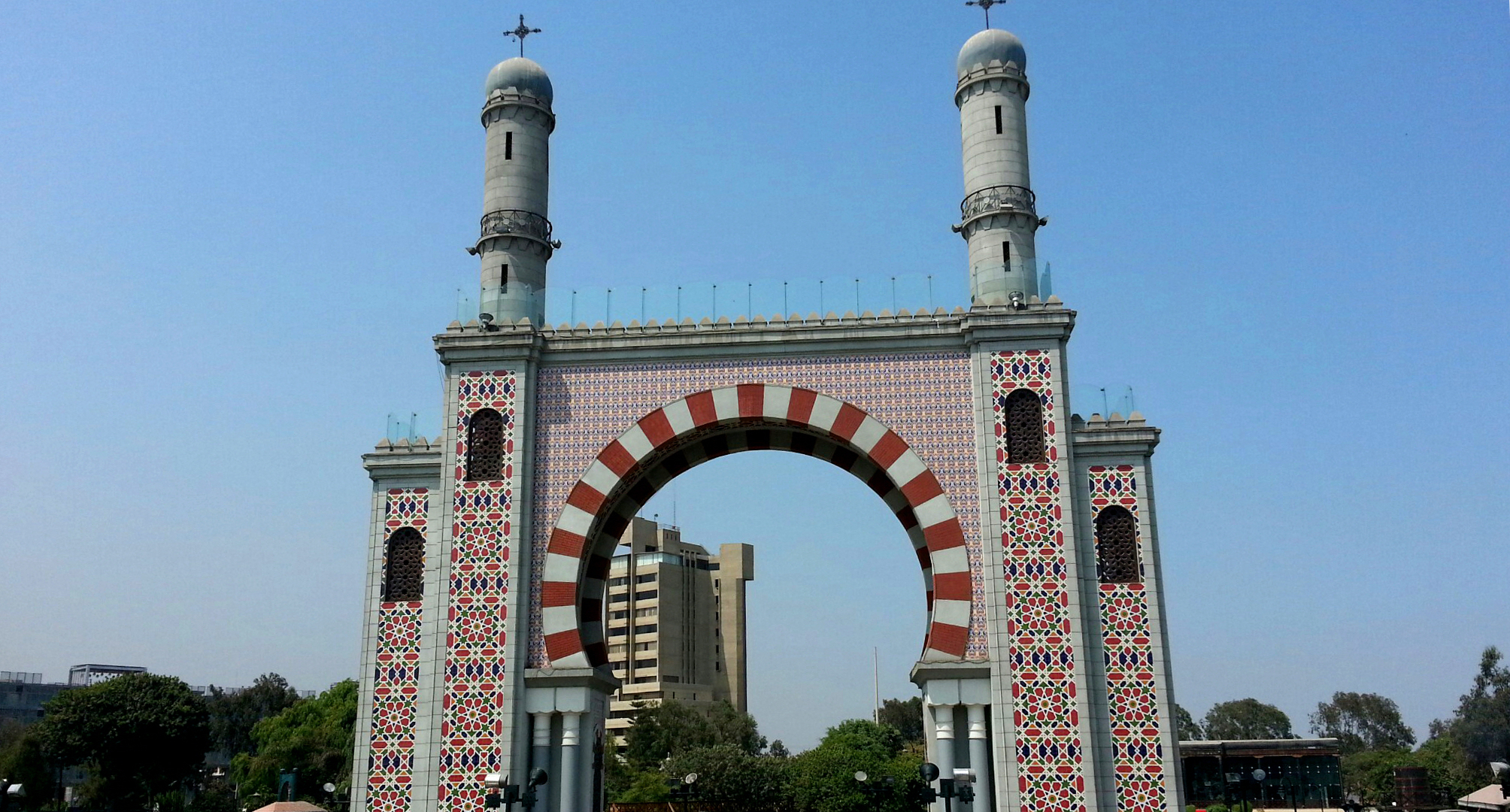
- The Moorish Arch at the Park
- Interactive map of Friendship Park
- Type: Public park
- Location: Santiago de Surco, Lima

María Graña Ottone Friendship Park (Spanish: Parque de la Amistad María Graña Ottone) is a public park located at the intersection of Alfredo Benavides and Caminos del Inca avenues, in Santiago de Surco, Lima, Peru. It features a monumental arch based on the one that once stood at Arequipa Avenue, in Lima District.

== History ==
The park is located at the intersection of Alfredo Benavides and Caminos del Inca avenues. It was inaugurated in a 2001 ceremony with the presence of the King and Queen of Spain, during the administration of Mayor Carlos Dargent, so that a new Moorish Arch could be installed in memory of the one that was originally on Arequipa Avenue.

It is the only park in Lima with Moorish decorations, which added an aesthetic style inspired by the Mosque-Cathedral of Córdoba. Access to the park is free (the only aspect that is charged for is the climb to the arch). The Augusto B. Leguía Cultural Centre, which houses the Casa de La Respuesta museum, is located in the park. Both are dedicated to the memory of those who fell in the War of the Pacific.

The park also has among its objects of historical interest, two old locomotives from 1926 that remain in operation. The park area includes a small lagoon, swimming pools, gardens and a food court with local dishes.

=== Augusto B. Leguía Cultural Centre ===
The Augusto B. Leguía Cultural Centre (Spanish: Centro Cultural Augusto B. Leguía) is an auditorium and cultural centre located in the park. Inaugurated on December 9, 2020, it features a bust of Augusto B. Leguía, after whom it is named.

=== Museum ===
The Museo Casa de La Respuesta (English: Museum of the "House of the Response") is the museum that is part of the cultural centre. It is themed around Juan Lepiani's La respuesta, a painting that depicts Francisco Bolognesi's interview with Juan de la Cruz Salvo, who requested the Peruvian garrison's surrender after the defeat at Tacna during the War of the Pacific. It features wax figures by artist Walter Huamán of the characters portrayed in the painting.

== See also ==
- Moorish Arch, Lima
