= Alfonso Ugarte =

Peruvian soldier (1847–1880)

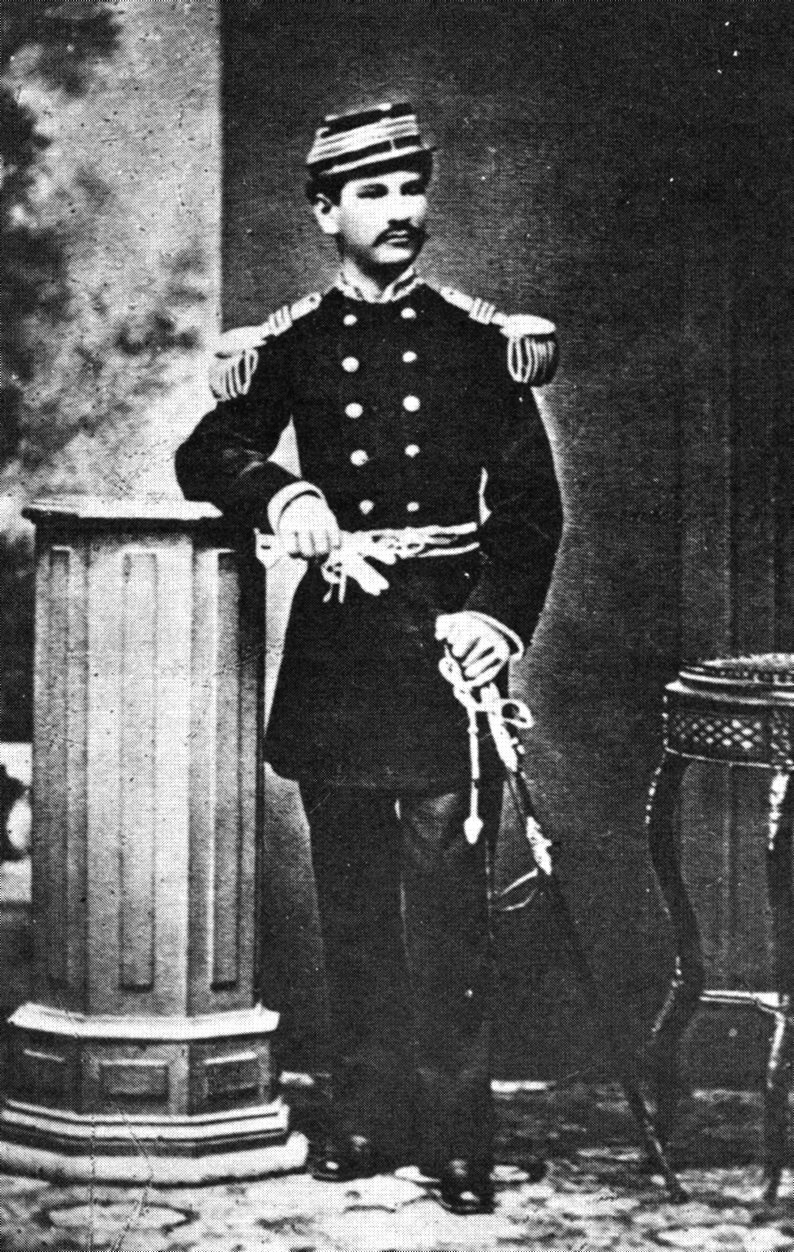
- Studio photograph of Ugarte, c. 1879

Provincial Mayor of Iquique
- In office January 4, 1876 – 1877
- President: Manuel Pardo y Lavalle
- Preceded by: Office established
- Succeeded by: Benigno Posada Galís

Personal details
- Born: July 13, 1847 Tarapacá, Tarapacá, Peru
- Died: June 7, 1880 (aged 32) Arica, Arica, Peru
- Cause of death: Killed in action
- Resting place: Crypt of Heroes
- Parent(s): Narciso Ugarte; Rosa Vernal Carpio
- Occupation: Agrarian, merchant, soldier

Military service
- Allegiance: Peru
- Branch/service: Peruvian Army; Southern Army
- Years of service: 1879–1880
- Rank: Colonel
- Unit: 8th Division
- Commands: Battalion "Iquique" No. 1
- Battles/wars: War of the Pacific; Battle of San Francisco; Battle of Tarapacá; Battle of Arica †

Alfonso Ugarte y Vernal (Tarapacá; July 13, 1847 — Arica; June 7, 1880) was a Peruvian civilian turned military commander during the War of the Pacific, between Peru and Bolivia against Chile. He held the rank of colonel.

== Early life ==
Ugarte was born in Tarapacá, Peru, the son of the rich local retailers Narciso Ugarte and Rosa Vernal. At an early age, he was sent by his parents to the Chilean port of Valparaíso, where he was educated, finishing his studies in 1868. On his return to Peru, he settled in Iquique, where he administered the family business. He was elected Provincial Mayor in 1876. He also became a member of the local charity, as well as of the local firefighting company, reaching the rank of third lieutenant.

== Military career ==
At the beginning of the War of the Pacific, Ugarte was about to leave the country for a business trip to Europe, but instead he decided to stay in order to organize a battalion using his own money. This unit was recruited from the workers and craftsmen of Iquique. It was named the Battalion "Iquique" No. 1, and it consisted of 429 enlisted men and 36 officers. As he enlisted a whole battalion to the war effort, he was admitted into the army as a colonel.

He fought at the Battle of Tarapacá, where he was injured in the head. The Peruvian forces retreated following this battle, and merged with the Army of the South, commanded by Major General Juan Buendía; the combined force marched from Tarapacá to Arica.

== Death ==
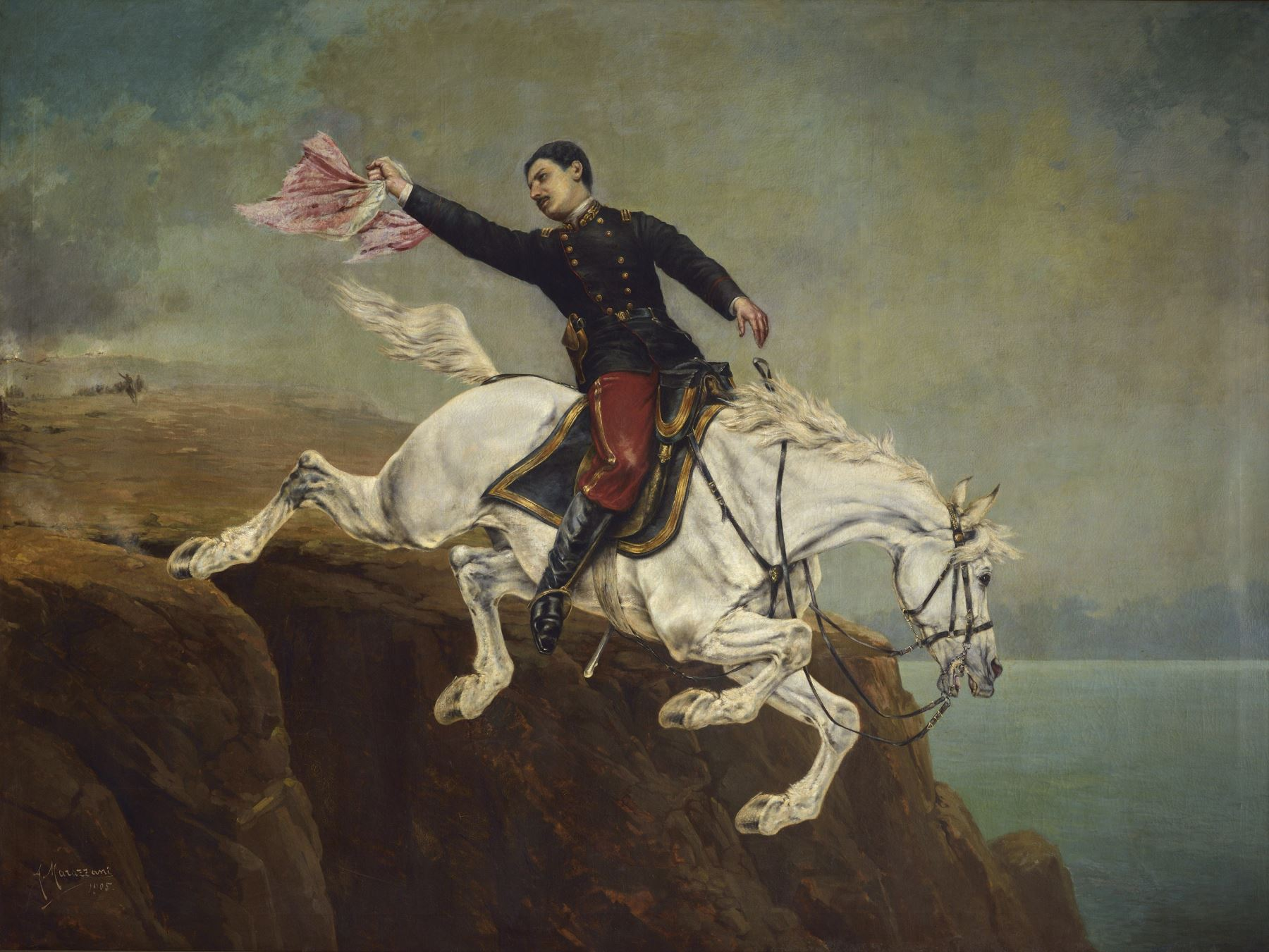
Painting by Lodovico A. Marazzani depicting Ugarte's death in Arica.

Ugarte was head of the Eighth Division in the defense of the city of Arica, where he participated in the two military councils held by Colonel Francisco Bolognesi, where the agreement was made to defend the bastion "until the last round is spent" (Spanish: hasta quemar el último cartucho).

The Battle of Arica took place on June 7, 1880. According to witnesses, Ugarte stated that "not even the tail" of his horse would be touched by the Chilean Army, and ultimately rode his horse over the Rock of Arica in order to prevent the Peruvian flag, which he was carrying, from being captured. Fifteen days later, the testimony appeared in La Patria, a newspaper based in Lima. This event is also recalled by Sir Clements Markham in his works about the conflict. A Chilean officer of the Mountain Detachment "Yungay" No. 3 also documented the event in a report.

In 1881, Chilean historian Benjamín Vicuña Mackenna wrote that on December 17, Nicolás de Piérola ordered that the southernmost defense redout in Lima be named after Ugarte, described by Vicuña as the "bizarre youth that, like La Rosa in Iquique, (Note: Pedro de la Rosa was a soldier of the Royal Army of Peru that turned to the Patriot side and, following the battle of Torata, retreated south. On February 13, 1823, he took part in an amphibious landing at Iquique, which was successfully repelled, leading to La Rosa and other soldiers launching themselves towards the sea in an attempt to reach the ship from which they had disembarked.) had jumped to the ocean" following the battle.

Ugarte's body was found at the bottom of the cliff, according to a recorded statement by José Diego Chávez, then priest of Arica, dated June 15, 1880. He was buried at a grave at the local cemetery, where he would remain buried until 1890, when a number of bodies were moved to Lima. On July 8, 1880, is 15-page last will and testament were read in Arequipa.

In 1890, a ceremony where a group of important tarapaqueños took his coffin to the mausoleum of Ramón Castilla took place. Years later, his body was taken to a mausoleum built by his mother in the General Cemetery of Lima. In 1979, historian Geraldo Arosemena Garland authorised the inspection of the body, his garments, and the flag.

== Legacy ==
Ugarte is today venerated as a Peruvian national hero, and his sacrifice in Arica, together with Colonel Bolognesi and the rest of the garrison, is commemorated in Peru's Day of the Flag. His will, in which he left his fortune to his mother and sister, is kept at the Regional Archive of Arequipa.

== See also ==
- Francisco Bolognesi
