= La respuesta (painting) =

Painting by Juan Lepiani

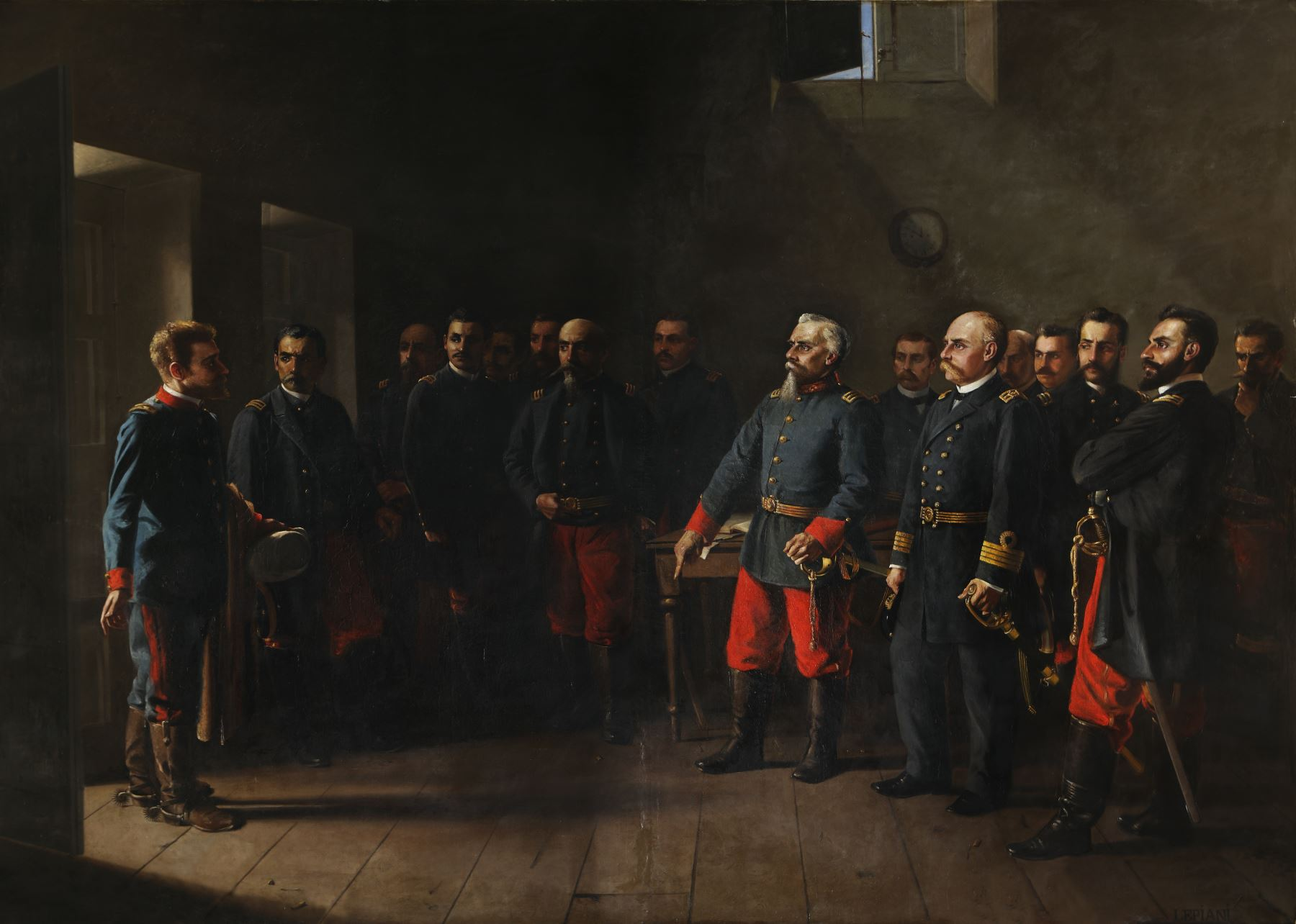
- Artist: Juan Lepiani
- Year: 1891
- Medium: Oil on canvas
- Location: Casa Bolognesi, Lima

La respuesta (Spanish for "The response"), also known as La respuesta de Bolognesi, is an 1891 oil painting by Peruvian painter Juan Lepiani. It forms part of the collection of the Combatants of the Morro de Arica Museum.

== Context ==
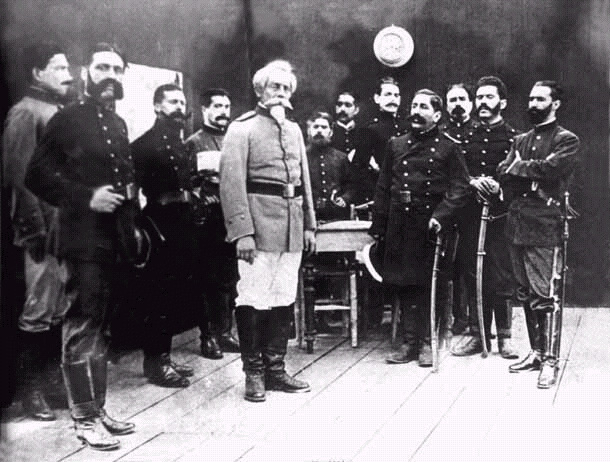
Recreation of the painting

The painting depicts a chapter of the War of the Pacific, where Chilean Major Juan de la Cruz Salvo arrived to Francisco Bolognesi's barracks in Arica, then part of Peru, to discuss the Peruvian group's surrender. Bolognesi replied to the request by saying "I have sacred dutes to fulfill, and I will carry them out until the last cartridge has been spent." Both armies subsequently fought in the violent battle two days later, where Bolognesi was killed in action.

In 1994, a photograph showing what appeared to be Bolognesi and his army was found by journalist Alejandro Guerrero in Tacna. It was purchased by businessman Genaro Delgado Parker and subsequently restored in a Kodak laboratory in the United States, with historians concluding that it was not a photograph of the men who fought in the battle, but rather a recreation based on Lepiani's painting.

== See also ==
- Battle of Arica
- El último cartucho
- Museo Casa de La Respuesta
