= Pedro Lagos =

Chilean infantry commander

Pedro Lagos Marchant
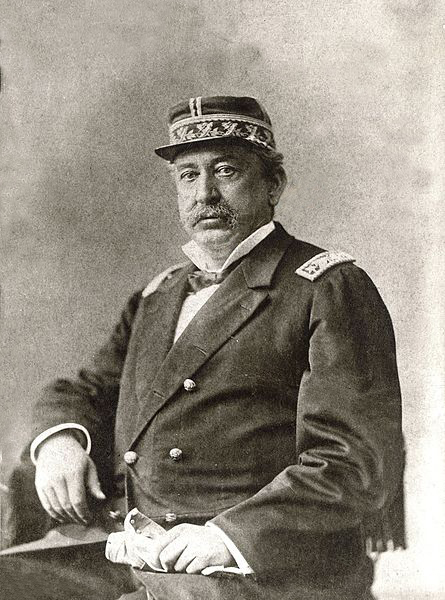
- Brigadier General Pedro Lagos
- Born: 1832; Chillán, Chile
- Died: 18 January 1884 (aged 51–52); Concepción, Chile
- Military career
- Allegiance: Chile
- Branch: Chilean Army
- Rank: Brigadier General
- Conflicts: Revolution of 1859; Occupation of Araucanía; War of the Pacific: Battle of Tacna; Battle of Arica; Battle of Miraflores; Occupation of Lima

Pedro Lagos Marchant (1832 – 18 January 1884) was a Chilean infantry commander. He is best remembered for commanding the assault and capture of the city of Arica during the War of the Pacific.

== Early life ==
He was born in Chillán in 1832 to Manuel Lagos y de la Jara and Rosario Marchant. The family moved to the countryside after the 1835 earthquake destroyed the city. Pedro was the first-born of 15 brothers of very poor background, and he started his studies at the first school opened in rebuilt Chillán. Soon afterwards, he continued them at the school founded by the Spaniard, José Martínez. In 1846, at the age of 14, he joined the Military School, where he obtained the rank of 1st Corporal in February 1847. He married his cousin Juana Marchant Lagos, and had a single daughter, Isabel.

== Military career ==
In March 1849, he enlisted in the Chilean Army with the rank of 2nd Sergeant. He was assigned to the Chacabuco battalion, which rebelled against the government on 29 April 1851 under the command of Colonel Pedro Urriola. He did not become involved in the rebellion as the event surprised him in Valparaíso; much to the contrary, he embraced the pro-government side, which won him a promotion to the rank of Lieutenant. In March 1852, he was promoted to Adjutant Major and, by 1854, he was Captain, serving with the garrisons of Chillán and Concepción until 1857. During the Revolution of 1859, he supported the government of Manuel Bulnes and participated soon in the siege of Talca and, in the North, in the Battle of Los Loros. These actions won him the promotion to the rank of Sergeant Major.

=== Campaigns in the Araucanía ===
Towards 1860, he actively participated in the campaigns of occupation of Araucanía. The actions against the Pehuenche communities of Bio Bío, achieved him his promotion to lieutenant colonel in 1866. In 1867, he became commander of the forces established in Malleco, and was designated commander of Angol. At this time, he married his cousin, Juana Marchant, and like most of the officials in the Araucanía he was awarded land, in his case in the Mulchén area. In 1869, he retired from the army to work his farm near Chillán.

== War of the Pacific ==
The second stage of the military career of Pedro Lagos defined its passage into history. In 1875, President Federico Errázuriz Zañartu appointed him Intendant of Ñuble, and, in 1878, he was commissioned as commander in Mulchén. In 1879, he participated in the War of the Pacific. He fought in the campaigns of Antofagasta, Tocopilla, Pisagua and Jaspampa. In January 1880, he was named chief of the general staff, a position to which he resigned due to differences with general Erasmo Escala, Army Commander-in-Chief in campaign. Again, he retired to the South. In the middle of 1880, he took up arms again, as aide to general Manuel Baquedano, and, as such, he participated in the campaign of Tacna, the Battle of Campo de la Alianza (the Alliance Field) in the Intiorco hill, on May 26, 1880 which meant the end of the Peru-Bolivian Alliance. There, at the head of the Amunátegui division, he managed to disperse the allied forces, that until his arrival were defeating the Chileans.

== Capture of Arica ==
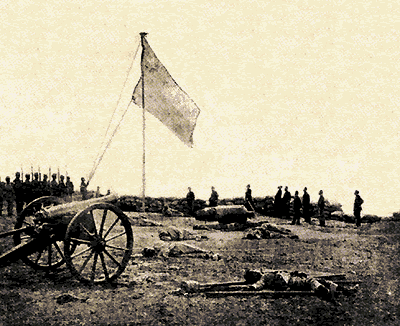
Chileans taking possession of Arica Cape after the battle

The battle that made him into a Chilean hero was the assault and capture of the Morro de Arica (Arica Cape), that took place on June 7, 1880. General Baquedano just ordered him to capture this city, and left him to plan the attack on his own . Lagos decided on a frontal assault with only 4,000 infantrymen, divided into three groups. The targets were the 3 main defenses of the city: the East fort, the Ciudadela (Citadel) fort and finally the Cape fort. The defeat of the Peruvian defenders at the first two forts, caught by surprise, was very quick. The Peruvians then retreated towards their main defense, bravely fighting back and trying to reorganize their lines. At that point, Lagos' idea was to wait for reinforcements before finally storming the Cape. Nevertheless, an unidentified soldier shouted "¡Al morro muchachos!" ("To the Cape, boys!"), causing the mass assault. This action altogether - from the initial attack to the capture of the Cape - took only 55 minutes. The feat was heroic, but it was marred by the lack of control over the assaulting troops, that led to a widespread killing of the surviving Peruvian soldiers and the citizens of the already surrendered city, which was looted.

=== Aftermath ===
A military man until the end, Pedro Lagos also had a valuable participation in the Lima Campaign, where he fought at the battles of San Juan and Miraflores. In March 1881, he was named Commander in Chief of the Occupation Army to replace General Baquedano, who returned to Chile. His short stint as head of the Chilean forces in Peru was highly controversial, due to his strict disciplinary measures against the citizens of Lima. On 18 June 1881, the Chilean Senate promoted him to Brigadier General, sent him back to Chile and appointed him chief of the Service Examination Commission. Finally, he was named Commander-at-Arms of the Santiago garrison on 23 November 1881. He died on 18 January 1884, in the city of Concepción.
