= Museum of the War of the Pacific =

Museum in Chile

- Museo de la Guerra del Pacífico
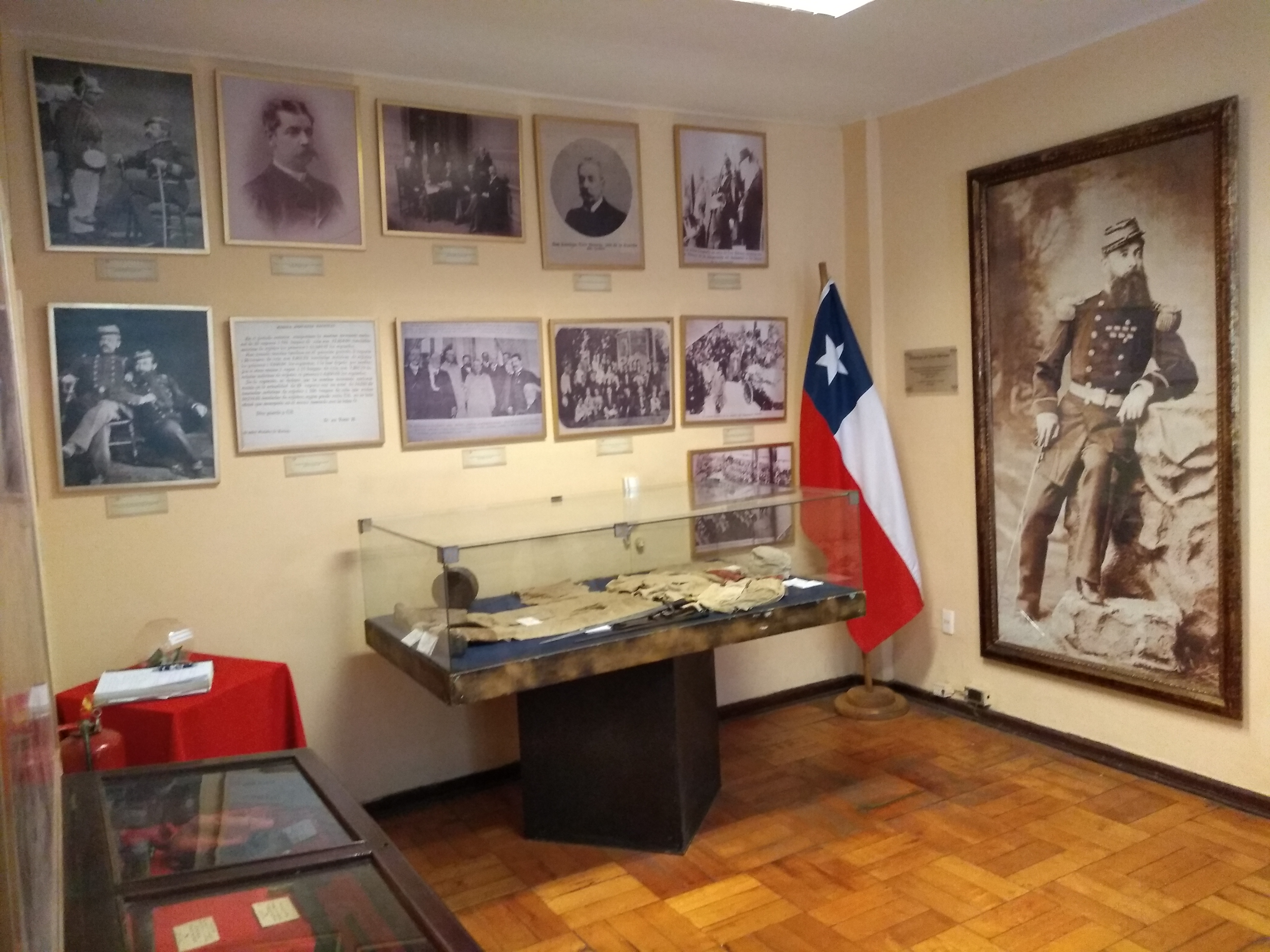
- Established: 2001
- Location: Cienfuegos 50 B, Barrio Brasil, Santiago, Chile
- Director: César Marcelo Villalba Solanas
- Website: guerradelpacifico1879.cl

The Domingo de Toro Herrera Museum of the War of the Pacific (Spanish: Museo Guerra del Pacifico Domingo de Toro Herrera) is a war museum located in the Barrio Brasil of Santiago de Chile dedicated to the War of the Pacific. It is a cultural centre owned and administered by the foundation of the same name, named after Domingo de Toro Herrera, a politician, engineer and soldier of the Chilean Army, and a veteran of the conflict who later held political positions and made other contributions to his country, in addition to having been the brother of Emilia de Toro Herrera, who was First Lady of Chile as the wife of President José Manuel Balmaceda. Opened in 2001, it is the only museum dedicated exclusively to this topic in all of Chile.

== Gallery ==
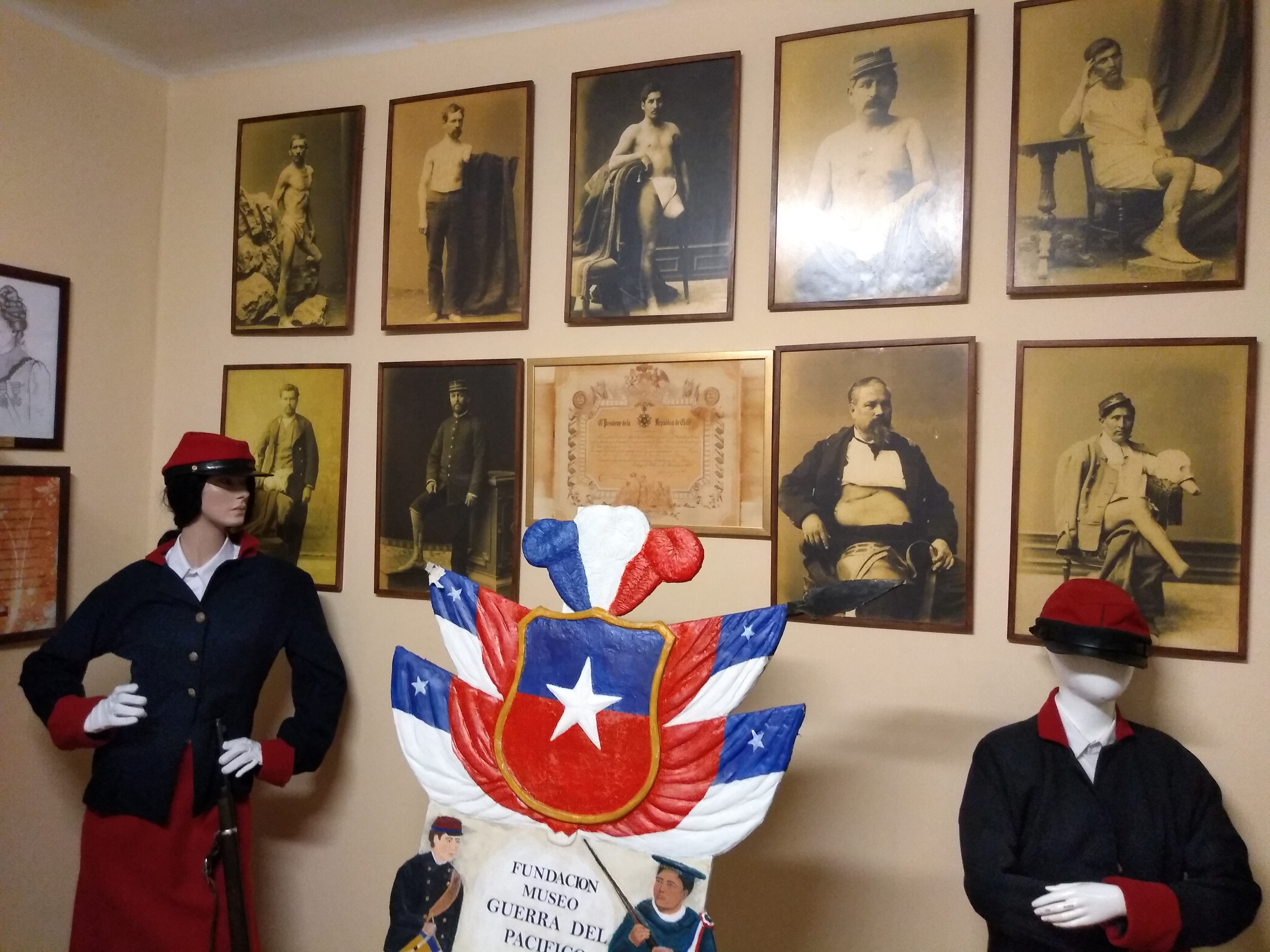
Sofanor Parra hall.

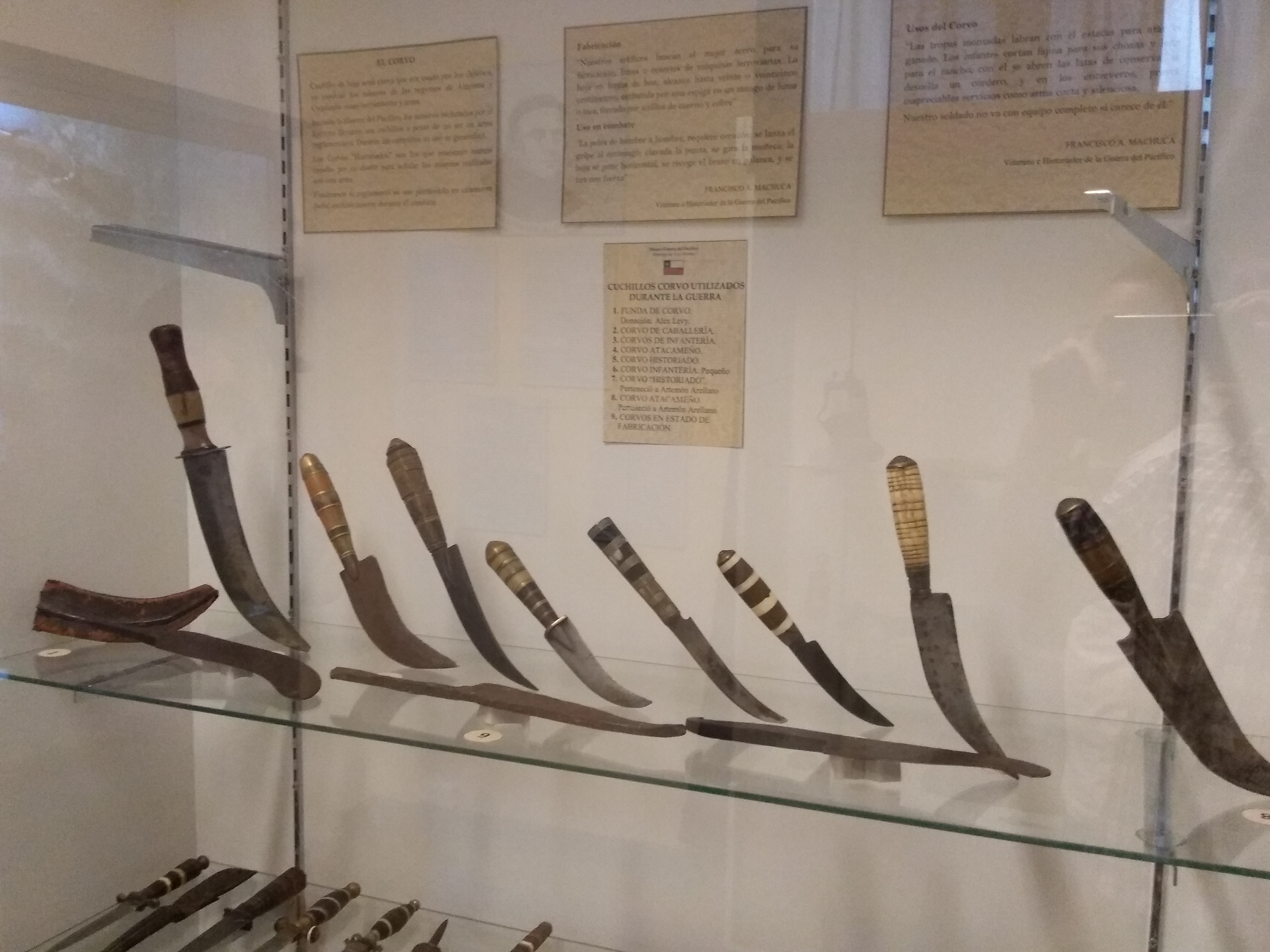
Showcase of Corvos used in the war.

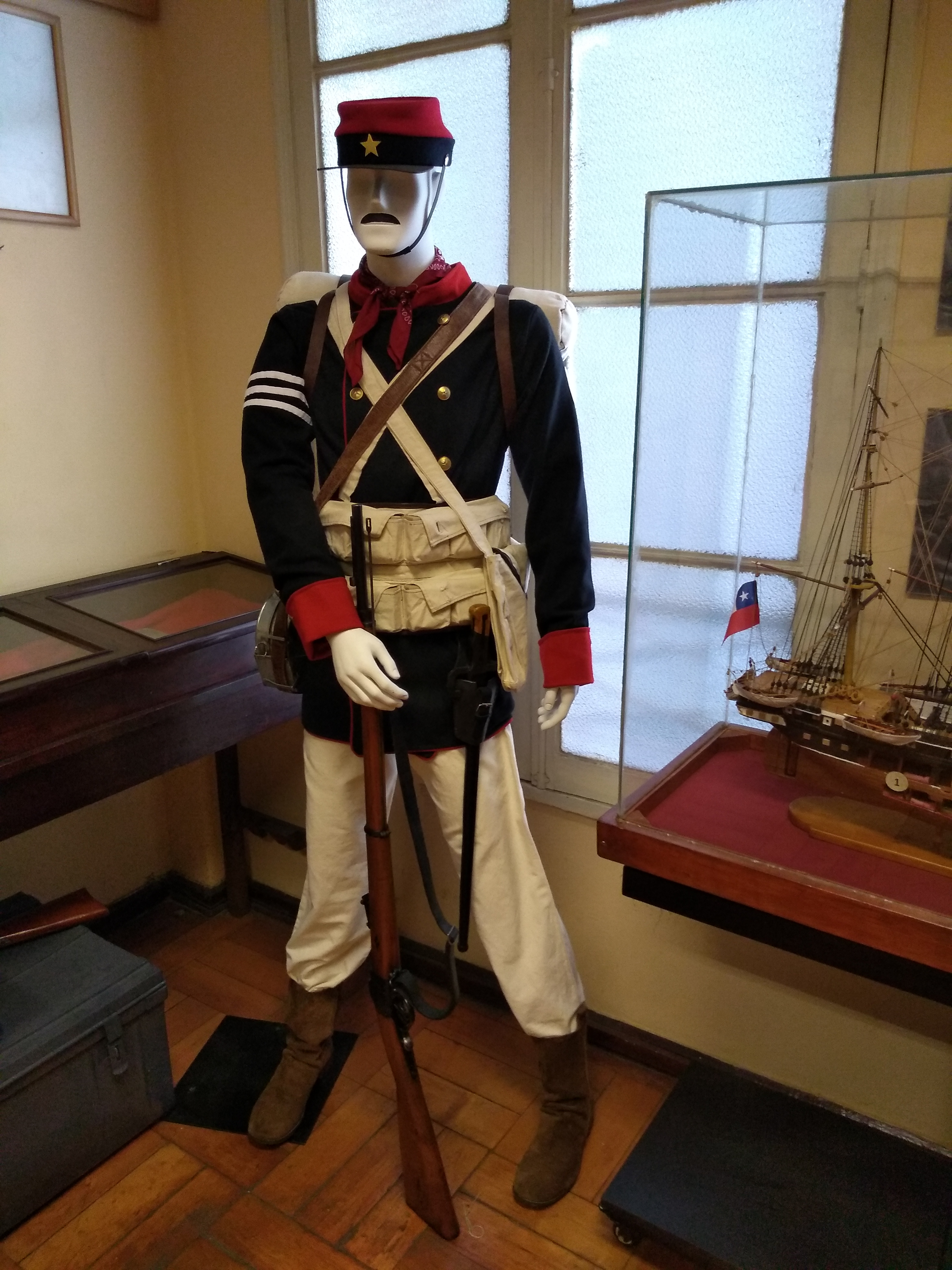
Replica of a Chilean uniform.

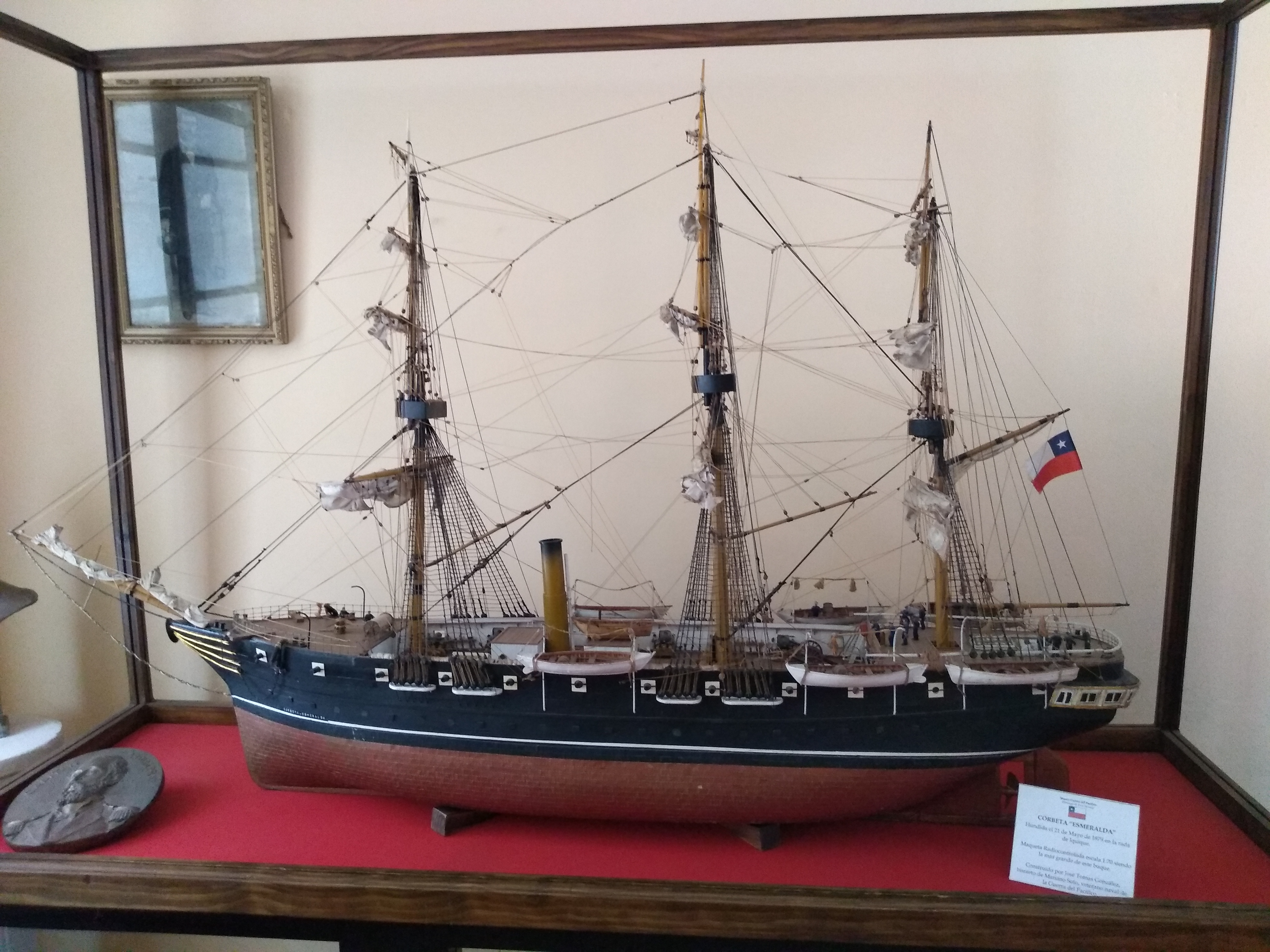
Replica of the Chilean corvette Esmeralda.

== See also ==
- Combatants of the Morro de Arica Museum
