= Moorish Arch, Lima =

Moorish arch in Lima, Peru

Moorish Arch
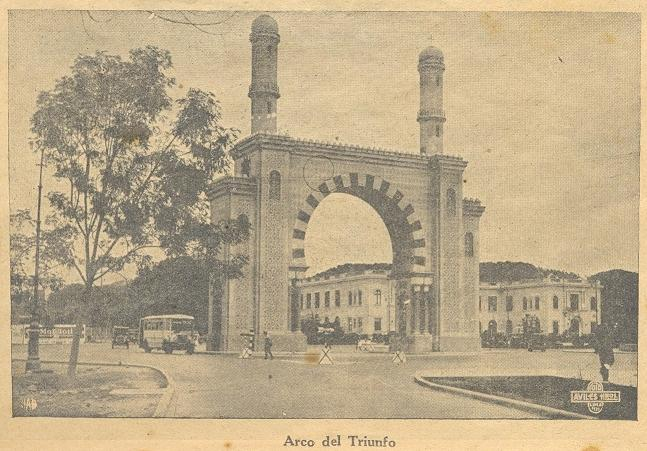
- The arch in Leguía Avenue
- Interactive map of Moorish Arch
- Material: Cement and majolica
- Height: 29 metres
- Beginning date: July 10, 1923
- Completion date: July 17, 1924
- Dismantled date: 1939

The Moorish Arch (Spanish: Arco Morisco), also called the Friendship Arch (Spanish: Arco de la Amistad) or Spanish Arch, was a triumphal arch installed at the beginning of Leguía Avenue (today Arequipa Avenue) in Lima, Peru. It was made in a neo-Moorish style, inaugurated in 1924 as part of the Centennial of the Independence of Peru, and demolished in 1939.

== Overview ==
The arch was located on the first block of Avenida Leguía, intersection with the Avenida 28 de Julio, in the Santa Beatriz neighbourhood; It had a height of 29 meters. It was made of cement with majolica decorations in the shape of stars and crescents, as well as two minarets.

== History ==
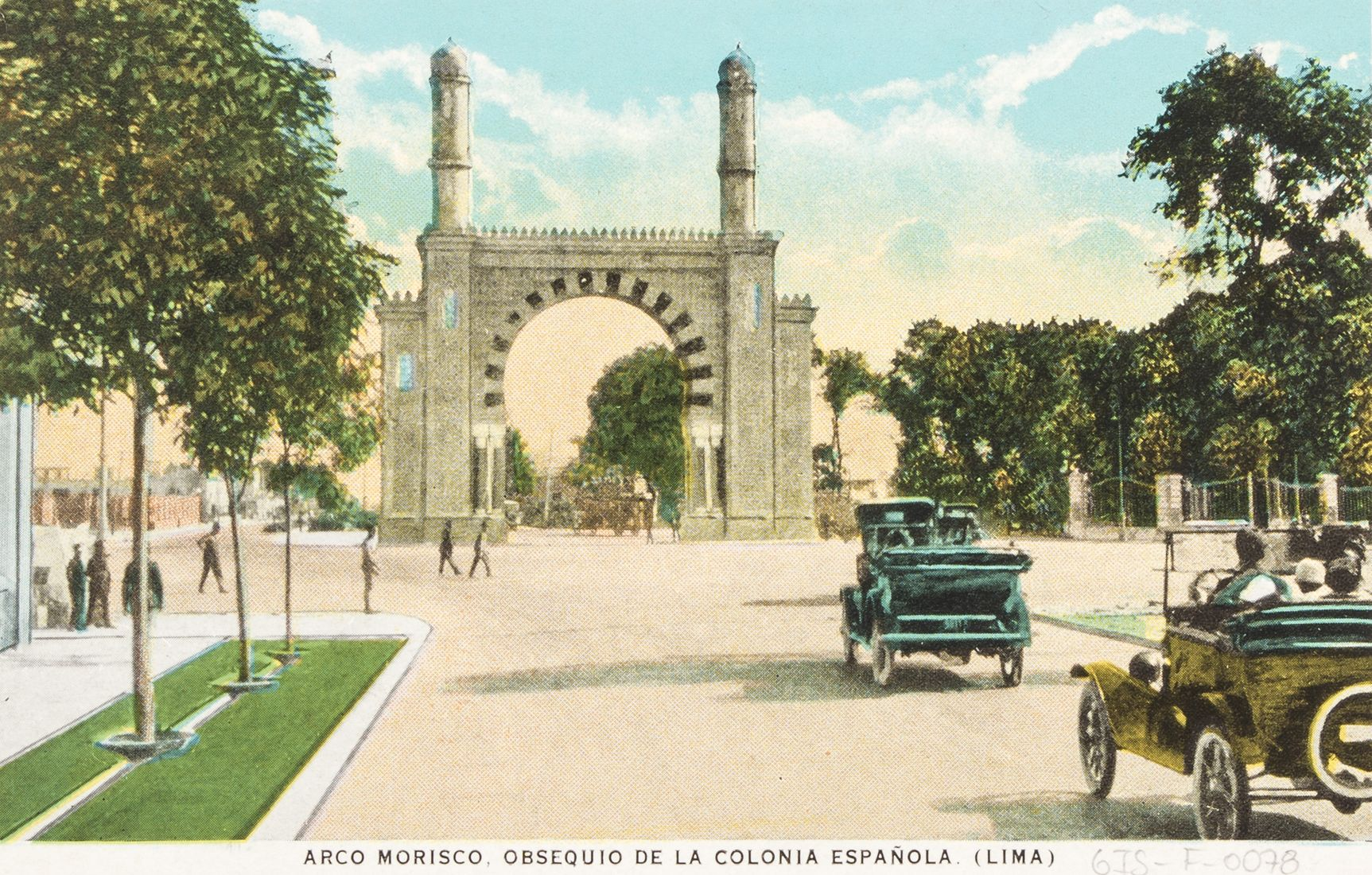
The arch, circa 1924.

In 1921, during the second government of Augusto B. Leguía, the Centennial of the Independence of Peru was celebrated and many colonies of foreign residents decided to grant gifts in the form of monuments to the Peruvian State. The gift of the Spanish colony was the Friendship Arch, a Moorish-style construction whose author is unknown. The original plans, deposited in Madrid, were lost due to the Spanish Civil War.

Construction began on its building on July 10, 1923, and it was delivered to the city of Lima on July 17, 1924. The inauguration ceremony was lavish, with the presence of President Augusto B. Leguía, the mayor of Lima Pedro Rada y Gamio, Gonzalo de Ojeda y Brooke, as representative of the Spanish government, and Arias Carraseno, representing the Spanish colony.

In 1938, President Óscar R. Benavides and his Minister of Development, Héctor Boza, ordered the demolition of the monument, alluding to traffic problems that it caused, and to widen Arequipa Avenue. The destruction with dynamite the following year caused unrest in the Spanish community, and some even interpreted Benavides' order as an act of political revenge against former President Leguía.

At the end of 2015, the National Association of the International Council on Monuments and Sites (ICOMOS) warned of the destruction of the footings of the remains of the Arch by the Brazilian construction company OAS, which was carrying out construction work on an overpass in the July 28 Avenue. The lawsuit filed by ICOMOS also reached the Municipality of Lima and the Ministry of Culture.

=== New arch ===
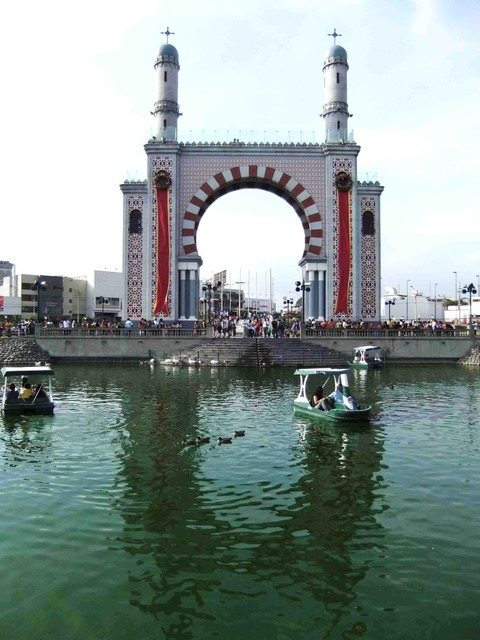
The new arch in Surco

Carlos Dargent, a politician from Lima, carried out initiatives for its reconstruction in the original location on Arequipa Avenue when he was a councilor of the Municipality of Lima. When his motion was rejected, he relocated his proposal to the exit of the Vía Expresa, then to the Higuereta roundabout. They offered to reinstall it on Argentina Avenue, but he considered that it was not a good option. Years later, when he was mayor of the Santiago de Surco district, he was able to carry out the work, with the financing of various Spanish companies.

On September 25, 2001, Mayor Dargent and the Spanish colony, with the presence of the King and Queen of Spain, inaugurated the new Friendship Arch, a faithful copy of its predecessor, located in the María Graña Ottone Friendship Park, in the intersection of Alfredo Benavides and Caminos del Inca avenues.

== See also ==
- Centennial of the Independence of Peru § Foreign gifts
