= Mariano Bolognesi =

Peruvian colonel and musician (1826–1899)

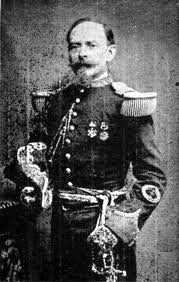
- Bolognesi in military uniform
- Born: February 4, 1826; Arequipa, Peru
- Died: July 11, 1899 (aged 73); Lima, Peru
- Relatives: Andrés Bolognesi (father); Francisco Bolognesi (brother)
- Military career
- Allegiance: Peru
- Branch: Peruvian Army
- Service years: 1854–1881
- Rank: Colonel
- Conflicts: Liberal Revolution of 1854; Battle of La Palma; War of the Pacific; Battle of San Juan; Battle of Miraflores

Mariano Andrés Bolognesi y Cervantes (né Boloñese; February 4, 1826 — July 11, 1899) was a Peruvian colonel, educator and composer. He was the son of composer Andrés Bolognesi and a younger brother of colonel Francisco Bolognesi.

== Biography ==
Bolognesi was born in Arequipa on February 4, 1826, being baptised at the El Sagrario Parish on the same day. He was the son of Andrés Bolognesi, an Italian Peruvian, and Juana Cervantes Pacheco, from Arequipa. One of many children, he was a younger sibling of Francisco Bolognesi (1816–1880).

It is likely that he and Francisco participated in the Liberal Revolution of 1854, as he was ascended to Lieutenant colonel in 1855, following the Battle of La Palma. On February 2, 1856, he married Rosa Coloma Salazar at San Marcelo Parish, in Lima. Coloma was a daughter of Juana Salazar y Sáenz de Ayala and José Ildefonso Coloma y Maldonado, a hero of the Peruvian War of Independence and a deputy and prefect for Arequipa. The marriage allowed him to enter the city's high society, as his best man was general Francisco Diez Canseco, brother-in-law of Ramón Castilla. In 1858, he was ascended to artillery colonel.

When Ramón Castilla's government disregarded the Constitution of 1856, Bolognesi requested his removal from the Army as a form of protest, dedicating himself to teaching music in Lima and Callao. He was reincorporated in 1862 by the government of Miguel de San Román. He served as president of the Philharmonic Society from 1866 to 1867, and as director of the Sociedad Amantes de la Música from 1872 and 1874. When Manuel Pardo y Lavalle visited the latter for a speech, its length made Bolognesi impatient, leading to him interrupting the president's speech with an overture by his students' orchestra. The offence led to Pardo closing the society.

Under the second government of Mariano Ignacio Prado (1876–1879), he was sent to Europe as a member of a commission in charge of studying the methods used to standardise the military's primary instruction, since many recruits were illiterate Quechua and Aymara-speaking Indians. During the War of the Pacific, he rejoined the Army to defend Lima against the upcoming Chilean invasion. He commanded the batteries at Chacra Alta (Callao) and, to prevent their capture, he disabled them following the battles of San Juan and Miraflores in January 1881.

After the war, he was placed on indefinite leave, serving in several public civilian positions. In 1886, he began working as an assistant for the Senate's chamber, a post he held until his death on July 11, 1899.

== Works ==
=== Poetic and musical compositions ===
- Canción nacional (1853)
- La arequipeña (1853)
- La aurora del 5 de enero (1855)
- La cantinera del ejército libertador (1855)
- Porvenir (1855), polka.
- La americana (1862), dedicated to Mexican general Ignacio Zaragoza.
- Dos de mayo (1866), song.
- El himno de la Salvadora Lima (1874)
- 2 de Mayo (1878), dedicated to Mariano Ignacio Prado.

=== Texts for musical instruction ===
- Principios elementales de la música (1861)
- Compendio de música elemental (1867)
- Manual de salmisación (1867?)

=== Texts for military instruction ===
- Prontuario de instrucción militar (1864), military manual reprinted in 1880 as Máximas, consejos e instrucciones sobre el arte de la guerra, distributed to reserve officials for the defence of Lima, also translated to English, French and Italian. It was not authorised by the government of Nicolás de Piérola and was later donated to the National Guard. It was re-edited in 2021.

== See also ==
- Francisco Bolognesi
