= Avenida Caminos del Inca =

Avenue in Lima, Peru

Caminos del Inca Avenue
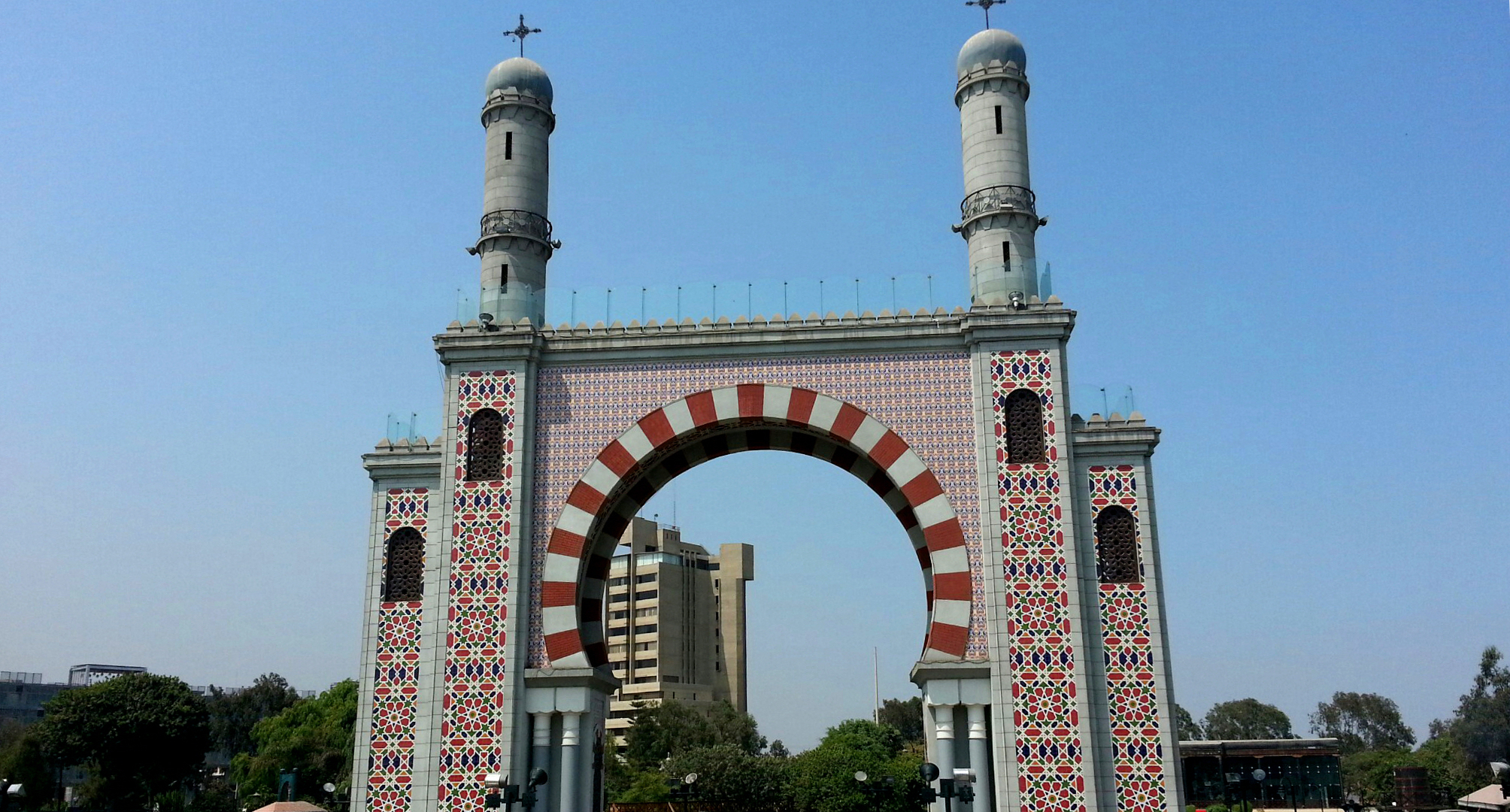
- Monumental arch next to the avenue
- Namesake: Inca road system
- From: Angamos Avenue
- Major junctions: Alfredo Benavides Avenue
- To: Tomás Marsano Avenue

Caminos del Inca Avenue (Spanish: Avenida Caminos del Inca) is a major avenue that crosses through the district of Santiago de Surco in Lima, Peru. It starts at its intersection with Angamos Avenue, and continues southbound until it reaches Tomás Marsano Avenue.

== History ==
Its name comes from the fact that it follows one of the paths of the Inca road system, as do a number of major avenues. The path that it forms part of is the road that starts at Santa Ana Church, in Barrios Altos.

Caminos del Inca Shopping Centre, located near the road's starting point, is named after the avenue.

On September 25, 2001, Carlos Dargent, mayor of Surco, and the Spanish colony, with the presence of the King and Queen of Spain, inaugurated the Friendship Arch, a faithful copy of its predecessor, the Moorish Arch, located in the María Graña Ottone Friendship Park, in the avenue's intersection with Alfredo Benavides Avenue.

== See also ==
- Inca road system
