= Casa Bolognesi =

Historical building in Chile

Coordinates: 18.4801°S 70.3209°W

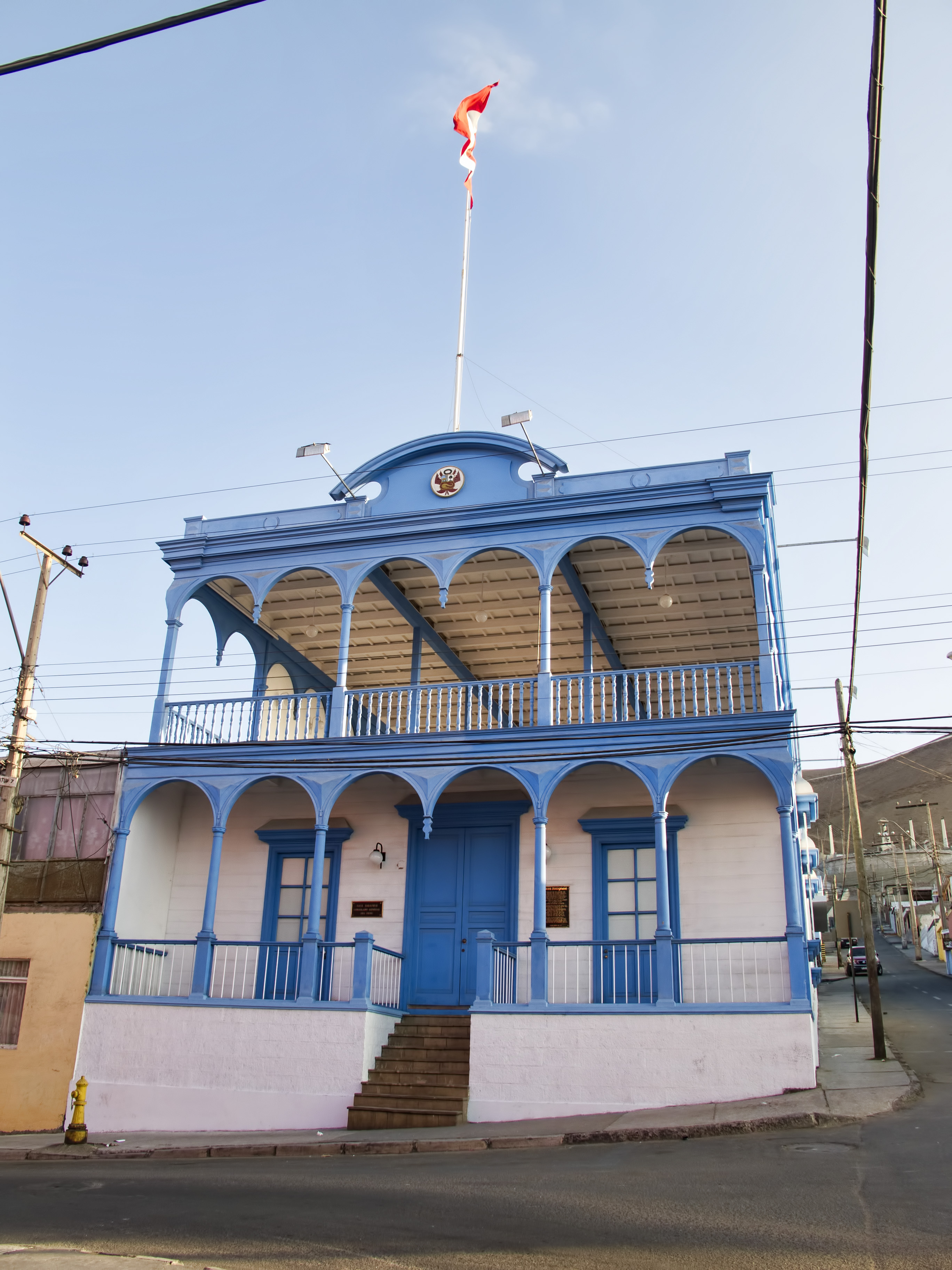
- Interactive map of Casa Bolognesi

General information
- Year built: 1870
- Renovated: 1995
- Owner: Peruvian State

The Casa Bolognesi, also known as the Casa de la Respuesta (House of the Reply), is a historical building owned by the Peruvian State located in Arica, Chile. It is the site of a meeting that preceded the Battle of Arica during the War of the Pacific.

== History ==
Its name comes from an event that preceded the battle of Arica during the War of the Pacific, being the site of the meeting between Francisco Bolognesi of the Peruvian Army and Juan de la Cruz Salvo of the Chilean Army, where the latter requested the Peruvian garrison's surrender after the defeat at Tacna, to which Bolognesi replied by saying he would "fight until the last cartridge is spent" (Spanish: hasta quemar el último cartucho).

From 1934 to 1987, it served as the Consulate General of Peru in the city, being the cultural section of the Consulate since 1996, having been restored the year prior.

It is used by the Peruvian government for ceremonies.

== See also ==
- Casa Yanulaque
- La respuesta (painting)
- Museo Casa de La Respuesta
