= Juan de la Cruz Salvo =

Chilean soldier

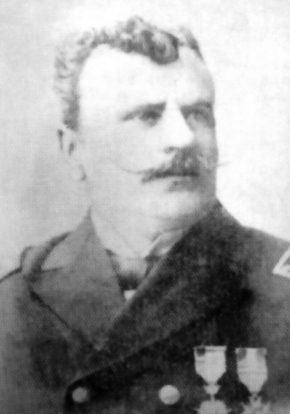
Undated photograph

Juan José de la Cruz Salvo y Poblete (Santiago; c. 1842 — c. 1917) was a Chilean soldier who fought in the War of the Pacific as a Sergeant major. He is best known for being the envoy sent by the Chilean Army to the headquarters of Francisco Bolognesi's garrison in Arica to request his surrender after the allied defeat at the Battle of Tacna, to which Bolognesi replied by saying he would "fight until the last cartridge is spent" (Spanish: hasta quemar el último cartucho).

== Painting ==
A painting by Peruvian painter Juan Lepiani illustrates the meeting between Salvo and Bolognesi.

== See also ==
- Battle of Arica
