= Lodovico Agostino Marazzani Visconti =

Italian sculptor (1853–1914)

Lodovico Agostino Marazzani Visconti (1853–1914) was an Italian sculptor and painter who lived in Peru. He was born in Piacenza, Italy into an aristocratic family. Count Marazzani studied art in Florence, and later became known for his equestrian art.

The Sladmore Galleries in London included his sculpture The Equestrian Show in May 2000 during an exhibition of equestrian sculptures.
