= Battle of Arica =

Battle in the War of the Pacific 1879–1884

- Part of the War of the Pacific
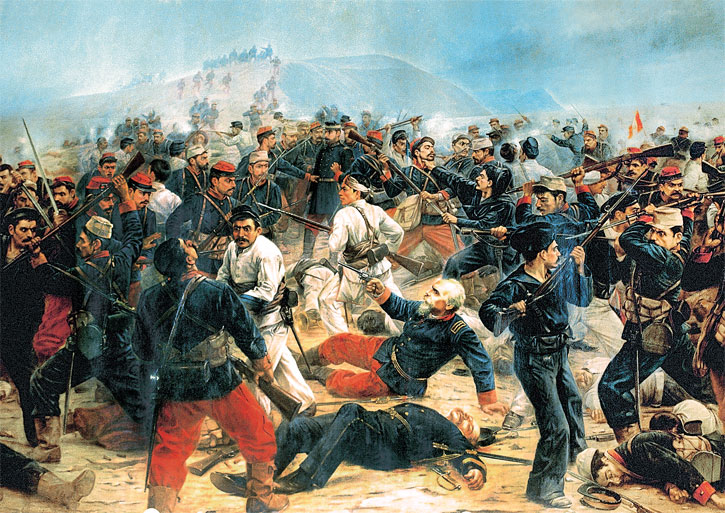
- El último cartucho by Juan Lepiani depicts Bolognesi's final moments. Oil on canvas, Lima, Peru.
Date	7 June 1880
Location	Arica, Arica, Peru (present-day Chile)
Result	Chilean victory

Belligerents
Chile	Peru

Commanders and leaders
(Chile) Pedro Lagos	(Peru) Francisco Bolognesi †

Strength
5,479	1,628

Casualties and losses
474 killed or wounded	1,000 killed or wounded 1 monitor lost

The Battle of Arica, also known as Assault and Capture of Cape Arica, was a battle in the War of the Pacific. It was fought on 7 June 1880, between the forces of Chile and Peru.

After the Battle of Tacna and the following Bolivian withdrawal from the war, Peru had to stand alone for the rest of the conflict. The need for a port near the location of the army, in order to supply and reinforce the troops and evacuate the wounded, made the Chilean command focus its attention on the remaining Peruvian stronghold in the Tacna Department. The Chilean army, led by Colonel Pedro Lagos, launched a giant assault on Arica, where the 1600 defenders fought more than 8000 Chileans, from sea and land, who finally captured the Morro de Arica (English: Cape Arica) after 55 minutes of combat. The defending Peruvian troops under the command of Colonel Francisco Bolognesi died as heroes. In this fight the old Peruvian Commander died along with several officers and more than 1,000 men.

The Chilean victory ended the phase of the conflict known as Campaña de Tacna y Arica (English: Campaign of Tacna and Arica), resulting in the occupation of the entire Tarapacá and Tacna provinces. After this action, a new stage began named Campaña de Lima (English: Lima Campaign), which concluded with the fall of the Peruvian capital city seven months later.

The city of Arica never returned to Peruvian hands. It was temporarily ceded to Chile after the signing of the Treaty of Ancon, in 1884; the city remained occupied by Chilean forces until the later signing of the Treaty of Lima in 1929, when it was ceded permanently to Chilean Sovereignty.

== Prelude ==
Since the outbreak of war in 1879, the initial naval stage came to an end with the capture of the ironclad ship Huáscar at Angamos, on 8 October 1879. After this, the Chilean Army disembarked at Pisagua on 2 November and drove the Allies inland. The Chilean Army claimed a series of victories at Germania and San Francisco, but ended with the Peruvian success at Tarapacá, on 27 November. Despite this latter victory, the Allies lost the Tarapacá department. Popular discontent in the Allied countries led to the removal from office of both President Prado in Peru and Hilarión Daza in Bolivia, replaced respectively by Nicolás de Piérola and Gen. Narciso Campero.

=== Naval preliminary actions ===
On 27 February, the Chilean Navy began bombarding the city's ground defenses. These defenses had a range of 3.5 km, providing a large covering zone for the remaining Peruvian ironclad, the Manco Cápac. The now Chilean warship Huáscar, after its resurfacing at Angamos, Grau had scuttled the ship to avoid it being captured by Chile. It had was sent for repairs and fitted with two 40 lb Armstrong type guns, with a firing range between 6 and 7 km. The ironclad was put under the command of Captain Manuel Thomson. The Huáscar arrived in Arica on 25 February in order to take the place of the warship "Cochrane" in the port blockade. Later the "Magallanes", led by Captain Carlos Condell arrived to join the "Huáscar" in the operation. The Chilean ironclad fought an ongoing and inconclusive duel with the "Manco Cápac". Though outclassed, the Peruvian monitor, covered by the land defenses, managed to hold the Chilean ships at bay for 4 months. During this time, Thomson died, being replaced by Carlos Condell. On 9 April, the Peruvian port of Callao was also put under blockade.

=== Preliminary land movements and engagements ===
On 8 March, a Chilean expeditionary force was sent to Mollendo, in order to interrupt communications between this port with Arequipa, where 4,000 Peruvian soldiers were posted. On the 22nd, and with General Manuel Baquedano as the new Commander in Chief of the Army of Northern Operations, the Chileans obtained the victory at Los Ángeles Hill. After this battle, the Chilean forces marched to the Sama river valley. From this rendezvous point, the Chileans marched to Tacna on a perilous march. During this march, the Chilean Minister Rafael Sotomayor died at Las Yaras, being replaced by Jose Francisco Vergara. On 26 May, the Army of Northern Operations conclusively defeated an allied army of 10,000 in the outskirts of Tacna. This battle proved decisive because Bolivia was knocked out of the war and retired to the Andes, and never engaged in the war again. From then on, Peru had to fight alone.

After reorganizing its troops, the Chilean command decided to take the port of Arica. With the entire allied army in Tacna destroyed, the port was an easy target for the large number of Chilean troops. Since February, the Peruvian garrison had already endured a naval blockade that had stopped supplies from reaching the garrison. This blockade was broken twice for the Peruvian army. On 1 June, Chilean troops led by Cmdnt. Rafael Vargas captured Engineer Teodoro Elmore, from whom they obtained the location of the landmines scattered around the city. 7,500 men were dispatched from Tacna to Arica by train arriving there in the early days of June.

==== Chilean surrender request ====
In the early morning of 5 June, the Chilean Sergeant Major José de la Cruz Salvo reached the Peruvian lines with a parley flag, requesting an interview with the commander of Arica. After Salvo was conducted to Bolognesi's headquarters in the city, they had the following dialogue:

- Salvo: Sir, the General commanding the Chilean Army, wishing to avoid useless bloodshed, after defeating the Allied Army at Tacna, has sent me to ask for your surrender, with all your men, provisions and munitions.
- Bolognesi: I have sacred duties to fulfill, and I shall fulfill them until the last cartridge has been fired.
- Salvo: Then, my mission is finished.

After consulting his officers on his decision, Bolognesi finally responded: "Tell your general that I am proud of my officers and am determined to fire until the last cartridge in Arica's defense, for it must not fall on your hands!" The phrase "until the last cartridge has been fired" (hasta quemar el último cartucho), which has now become part of the Spanish language, is also the official motto of the Peruvian Army.

== The contenders ==
=== Peru ===
==== Peruvian situation ====
After the defeat in Tacna, the Arica Peruvian garrison lost communication with the army in retreat. Only five survivors from it came to Arica with news about the battle. Several telegraphs sent to Tacna had no answer. Bolognesi still hoped that the Allied army at Tacna had not been obliterated and a portion of it would come to reinforce his position. After Tacna, Montero had decided to withdraw the forces guarding Arica, knowing that the port was already lost. Pierola's deputy, Del Solar, sent Col. Pacheco Cespedes to Arica in order to communicate the decision to abandon the city, but he never arrived at his destination, due to the Chilean troops in the area.

After the Chilean forces started to concentrate on Arica, Bolognesi's troops were completely isolated. A Chilean cavalry vanguard captured the engineer Teodoro Elmore, who was to blow up the railroads captured by the Chileans in Lluta. With his capture, the Chilean army knew the location of minefields and reduced the troops' apprehension, thereby permitting a ground assault.

==== Peruvian forces ====
The Peruvian garrison at the port consisted of 1,628 men – 29 chiefs, 223 officers and 1,376 soldiers. The defensive batteries at the cape were divided into three groups: East, North and South. The northern group had several batteries at town level: Santa Rosa (1 Vavasseur cannon with a 5 km range), San José (1 Vavasseur and 1 Pairot also with a 5 km range), and Dos de Mayo (1 Vavasseur). This group of cannons was led by Medardo Cornejo. The east group had seven Voruz cannons, protected by a sand trench, commanded by Juan Aillón. Finally the southern group, led by Juan Guillermo Moore, had eight cannons (6 Voruz, 1 Pairot and 1 Vavasseur), adding up a total of nineteen cannons.

The infantry posted here were the 7th and 8th divisions. The 7th Division had three battalions: Sappers of Tacna, Tacna Artisans and Piérola Rifles. The 8th had two units, the Tarapacá and Iquique battalions. The soldiers had mostly Chassepot rifles, providing lesser firepower than the Chilean weapons.

=== Chile ===
==== Chilean situation ====
After suffering heavy losses at the battle at Tacna, the Chilean command realized the need of a port in the area to resupply the troops and to evacuate the wounded. 4,500 men were sent to Arica, while another 13,000 were posted at Tacna and its surroundings, forming an impossible barrier for the 4,000 soldiers of Leiva's Second Southern Army. Even the addition of the remaining forces of Montero would not bring the Peruvian forces up to 6,000 men, and they had no artillery support whatsoever.

==== Chilean forces ====
After Tacna, the Chilean army kept its position at the outskirts of the city for a few days. This positioning prevented the Peruvians from reinforcing the garrison at Arica or communicating the order to leave the port. Leaving the most damaged units here, Gen. Baquedano decided to send part of the army under the command of Colonel Pedro Lagos, formed by the "Buin" 1st Line Regiment of Col. Luis José Ortíz, the 3rd Line Regt. led by Col. Ricardo Castro, Sergeant Major Juan José San Martín's 4th Line Regiment, the Bulnes Infantry Battalion, the Carabineros de Yungay Cavalry Regiment and four artillery batteries attached to the 1st and 2nd Artillery regiments, taking under consideration the low casualties sustained by these units in the previous battle. The infantry had been equipped with the Comblain and Gras rifles. The Chileans totalled 8,000 soldiers with the late arrival of the Lautaro Battalion.

== The battle ==
=== Chilean battleplans ===
The Battle of Arica according to Diego Barros Arana's, "Historia de la Guerra del Pacifico"

After the battle of Tacna, Col. Pedro Lagos was ordered to take Arica at any cost. He was left to decide on his own the way to do it. Lagos decided on a frontal assault with only 4,000 infantry, divided into three groups.

This attack will not be made trotting, lads. Has to be performed on the run. The enemy must be surprised and forced to surrender before the powerful mines at the Cape explode...

— Colonel Pedro Lagos

The targets were the three main defenses of the city: the East Fort, the Ciudadela (Citadel) Fort and finally the Cape Fort. The Ciudadela Fort was to be taken by the 3rd Line Regiment with the "Buin" 1st Line Regiment in reserve. The East fort would be attacked by the 4th Line Regiment. Col. Lagos was initially reluctant to attack Arica directly fearing excessive bloodshed; thus he asked for the surrender of his opponent, Francisco Bolognesi, an Italo-Peruvian veteran brought out of retirement when the war broke out. Lagos' pleas fell on deaf ears when Bolognesi replied that he would fulfill his duties until he had fired his last shot. Subsequently, both sides prepared for battle.

=== Peruvian battle plans ===
The Peruvian force had little choice but to wait for the attack on their defenses and admitted that the garrison had no choice but to make the impending Chilean victory as hard as they could.

...we thought in any way in order to make the victory as difficult as we could. We had the expectation of forcing them to have the laurels of victory among fields of bodies, oceans of blood...

— Jose Sanchez Largomarsino, Commander of the Manco Cápac ironclad

The entire city was mined in order to inflict as many casualties as these gadgets could explode while the Chilean army was passing through. The engineer Elmore made a study of the terrain determining the soil resistance in order to make three galleries where the land mines were planted.

...five series on the right flank; seven on the left flank; four on the center. Each series had ten charges, each charge of ten kgs. of dynamite. In the city were several distributed by section. Under the park were the Bulnes Battalion stood for so long existed an extensive one having 30 quintals of dynamite. This was meant to blow up the entire city...

— Engineer Teodoro Elmore

=== The assault ===
Using the night's darkness, the 3rd Line and 4th Line regiments marched towards the Azapa Valley and to their objectives. The Peruvian sentries on the Ciudadela Fort saw the Chilean deployment and opened fire. The 3rd Line Regiment ran to the fort and took it in hand-to-hand combat. The defenders were very quickly defeated. The use of land mines had made the assaulting force furious and they took no prisoners. Only the action of the officers prevented a total annihilation of the Peruvian troops.

... I'd rather not remember. They abused their numbers, playing with their corvos and bayonets; they were as blind as raging bulls; I have no words...

— Juan Sanchez, gunner of the East fort

At the East Fort exactly the same thing happened. This stronghold was taken by the 4th Line Regiment, also outnumbering and obliterating the defenders in a frontal charge. The remaining defenders then retreated to their main defense up the cape, fighting back and trying to reorganize their lines. At this point, Colonel Lagos's idea was to wait for reinforcements of the "Buin" 1st Line Regiment to arrive before finally storming the Cape Fort. At the same time, the Peruvian monitor Manco Cápac, which was defending the Cape from the sea, was attacked by four Chilean warships of the Navy, the Huascar included. An artillery bombardment between the two armies was exchanged, with the Chilean artillery strikes directed by the 1st and 2nd Artillery regiments.

However, an unidentified soldier shouted "¡Al morro muchachos!" ("To the Cape, boys!"), causing a mass assault. The Chilean officers had nothing to do but to follow their soldiers in a frenetic race for the summit. The infantry had to run up the hill facing the Peruvian men commanded by Colonel Bolognesi. Quickly the Chilean assault degenerated into a confusing pandemonium marked by the explosion of mines placed by the Peruvian defenders. The defenders were overrun and annihilated. Col. Bolognesi's plan was to blow up his gunpowder reserves when the Chileans reached the fort and cause massive casualties among the Chileans. However, he was unable to do this, and he fell in combat together with most of his men.

The final assault was directed by the Commander of the 4th Line Regiment, Major Juan José San Martín (who died in battle) and Sergeant Major Felipe Solo de Zaldívar who was the first to reach the summit of the Cape. After 55 minutes, the Cape had been taken by Chilean troops.

== Aftermath ==
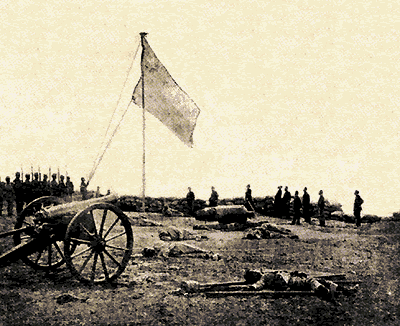
Chileans taking possession of Arica Cape after the battle

The Chileans won the battle, and Colonel Bolognesi was killed. Some other high-ranking Peruvian officers who also perished were Colonel Alfonso Ugarte (who drove his horse off the cliff down into the Pacific Ocean to prevent the capture of the Peruvian flag by Chilean forces), and Colonel Mariano Bustamante, his Chief of Detail. These three Peruvian officers belonged to the group that had rejected the offer to surrender to the Chilean army and prompted Colonel Bolognesi to vow to the Chilean emissary that he was going to defend the garrison to the last shot.

One high-ranking officer who survived the battle and its aftermath was Lieutenant Colonel Roque Sáenz Peña, a volunteer officer of the Peruvian Army, who later went on to become President of Argentina.

Since the Morro de Arica was the last bulwark of defense for the allied troops standing in the city, the city was quickly captured.

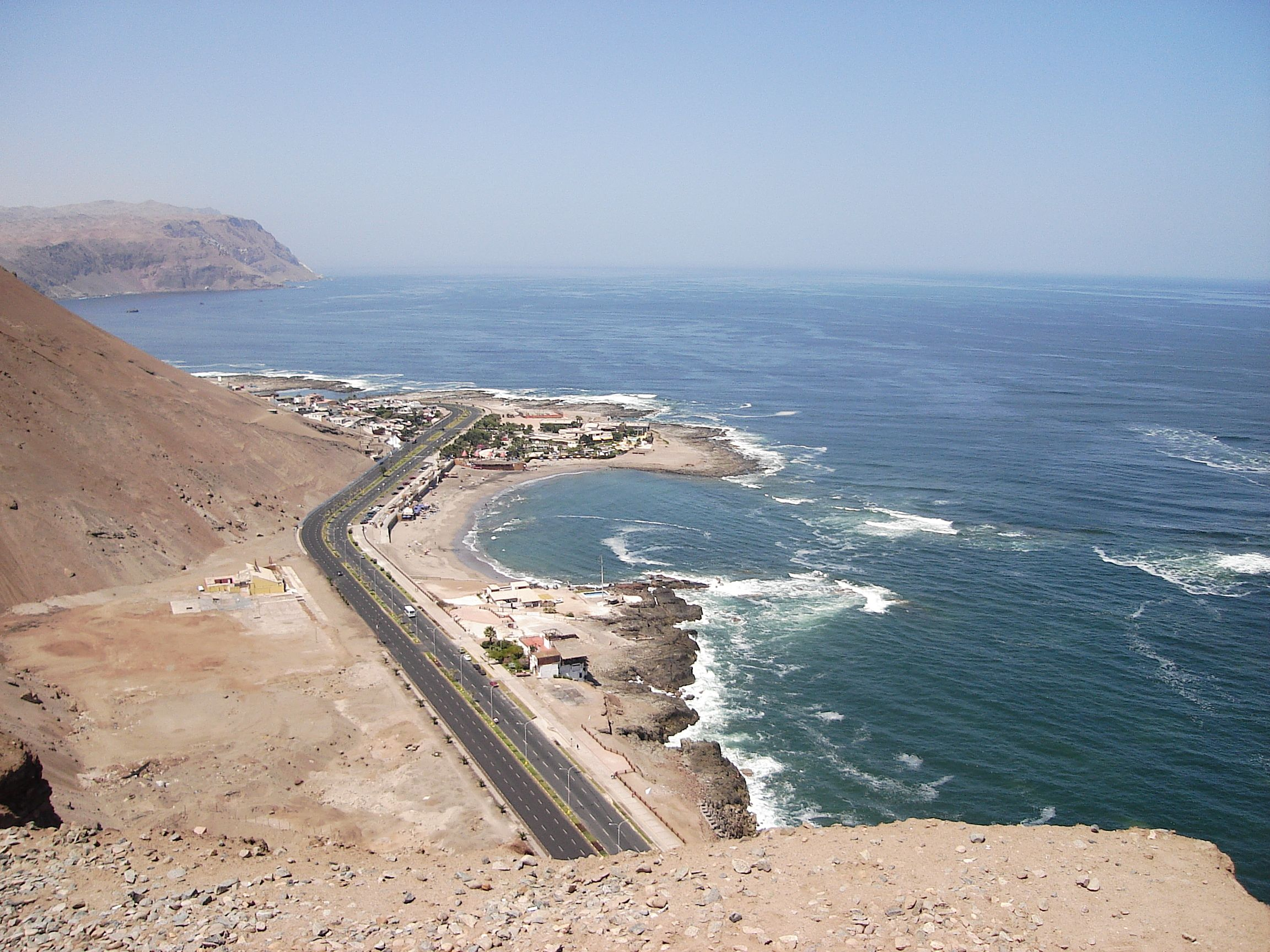
Looking down from the cape

With the fall of the city, the ironclad Manco Cápac found herself short on supplies and with the nearest friendly port four days away at Callao. Faced with an impossible trip, she was scuttled to prevent her capture by the Chilean military. The torpedo boat Alianza scape of Arica trying to reach Mollendo, but was pursued by the ironclad Cochrane and the gunned transport Loa that fired at them, until at noon and at the height of the Sama hill, the Cochrane returned to Arica, but the Loa continuing the pursuit alone. In Punta Picata, Tacna, the boat was stranded due to the impossibility of continuing because the engines were overheated and its crew blew it up with a boom torpedo to avoid its capture by the enemy.

Arica to this day remains part of Chile and is a constant symbol of friction with its neighbors Peru and Bolivia. For Peru it is commemorated as Flag Day for the heroic stances of both Bolognesi and Ugarte together with the rest of the garrison, while the Chilean Army honors the anniversary as Infantry Day every year, in commemoration of the heroism of the thousands of Chilean infantrymen who fought the battle to its victorious end.

== See also ==
- Combatants of the Morro de Arica Museum
