= Battle of Tarapacá =

1879 battle of the War of the Pacific

Battle of Tarapacá (1879)
- Part of the War of the Pacific
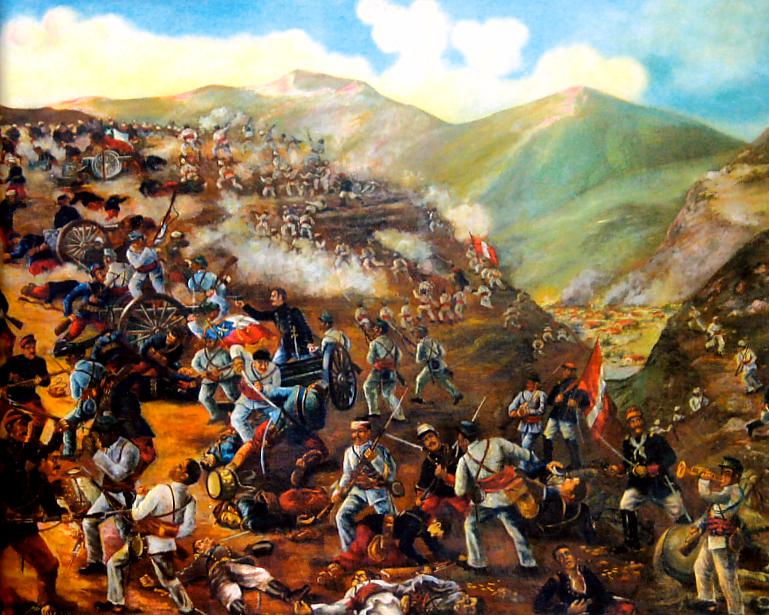
- Battle of Tarapacá
| Date | 27 November 1879 |
| Location | Tarapacá, Peru |
| Result | Peruvian victory |

Belligerents
| Peru | Chile |

Commanders and leaders
| (Peru) Juan Buendía (Peru) Francisco Bolognesi | (Chile) Luis Artega † (Chile) Ricardo Vargas (POW) (Chile) Eleuterio Ramírez † |

Strength
| Tarapacá: 3,046 infantry Pachica: 1,440 infantry Total: 4,486 infantry | 2,300 between infantry, cavalry and gunners 8 guns |

Casualties and losses
| 236 killed 261 wounded 76 missing | 788 killed and wounded 66 captured 8 guns captured Total casualties: 862 casualties |

The Battle of Tarapacá occurred on 27 November 1879 during the Tarapacá Campaign of the War of the Pacific. A Chilean force of 2,300 soldiers divided in three columns attacked a Peruvian contingent of 4,486 troops at Tarapacá commanded by Gen Juan Buendía, resulting in a harsh defeat. The Chilean 2nd Line Regiment was the most damaged unit, losing almost half of its force, along with its commander Lt. Col. Eleuterio Ramírez and his second in command, Lt. Col. Bartolomé Vivar. The unit lost its banner, which was recovered six months later after the Battle of Tacna. Despite the victory, the Allies could not contest for the domination of the Tarapacá department, abandoning it to Chilean control.

== Background ==
Battle of Tarapacá according to Diego Barros Arana's "Historia de la Guerra del Pacifico"

Following a significant defeat at Dolores well inflicted by an outnumbered Chilean contingent - which cost the Allies all their artillery - the remnants of the Peruvian army were scattered all across the desert, demoralized and almost leaderless. Belisario Suárez's soldiers marched to Tarapacá, the former administrative Peruvian capital of the department, to join Buendía. Buendía's army gathered at Tarapacá, reunited with Suárez, whose men had marched across the harsh desert terrain. When Buendía arrived at Tarapacá, he dispatched emissaries to gather more of those troops dispersed from the battle at Dolores. Within a few days, his force now numbering 2,000 men, on the 26th Rios's division arrived from Iquique with supplies, Rios's column supplementing the food and water already existing at Tarapacá. By now, 4,500 allied soldiers were stationed at Tarapacá.

Meanwhile, as these events unfolded, acknowledging that a column of exhausted Peruvians under Buendía had stopped near the Tarapacá to rest. Lt. Col. José Francisco Vergara asked Gen. Arteaga to dispatch a reconnaissance force to find out the enemy's condition as well as inspect the condition of the route.

Hence, on 24 November Arteaga dispatched under Vergara’s command a party of 270 men of the Zapadores Regiment, 2 artillery pieces, 115 riders of the Cazadores a Caballo Cavalry Regiment. Vergara’s column took the road to Dibujo, camping about 20 kilometres (12 mi) from Tarapacá. Later, Arteaga was informed that the Peruvian numbers were greater than expected, so he sent another column made up of the 2nd Line and Artillería de Marina regiments, the Chacabuco Battalion, 30 more Cazadores a Caballo riders and another artillery battery. Next day, Chilean sentries of the vanguard division captured an Argentinean muleteer, who reported only 1,500 men at the town. In receipt of this news, Vergara asked Arteaga for instructions, his request creating great anxiety among Chilean High Command and troops. At this point, the Chilean commanders soundly underestimated the battle capabilities of the Allies. Arteaga did not properly prepare the Chilean forces dispatched for battle, meaning they carried insufficient amounts of food, water and ammunition, all of which had serious consequences later on.

Vergara, meanwhile, gave little importance to supplying his troops properly. Instead, Vergara made a reconnaissance of the Peruvian positions.

The reinforcements dispatched by Arteaga reunited with Vergara's troops on noon of the 26th at Isluga. As both Chilean divisions gathered, Arteaga arrived with additional forces to assume command. It appears at this time Arteaga thought, given the condition of his soldiers, the Allies too must be as exhausted, thirsty and weary as his own men. Only that day, some of Arteaga's Chilean troops had marched for nine hours, bringing to 30 hours the total time his men had marched across burning sands with little food or water. This arduous advance severely diminished the fighting capabilities of the Chilean troops, leaving them in poor condition for battle. Worse, since they were now 70 km (45 mi), across desert terrain, from the nearest source of Chilean supplies at Dolores, Arteaga realised that their only salvation was to attack. In addition, Arteaga continued to believe he faced only 2,500 Peruvian soldiers when in fact Arteaga's forces added up to just 2,281 men, around half the strength of Buendía’s contingent.

=== Battlefield ===
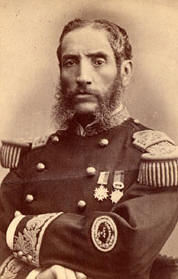
Andrés Cáceres, commander of the Peruvian Zepita Nº 2 Battalion

The Tarapaca oasis was 70 km (45 mi) from San Francisco/Dolores. This commercial town was founded by the Spanish in the 16th century, using one of the Inca roads that link up the mountains with the sea. A little creek, formed by snow melting in the Andes, runs through the town, allowing small plantations along the stream bed. The Peruvian administration buildings were next to rock walls, with the market and the church at the very centre of the town. Militarily, the town buildings lay in what was effectively a wide ravine, on the west side of the ravine. A ridge leading up to a waterless, flat and barren plateau bordered the town to the west. To the east, running for several Km/Mi, were a series of rugged ridges and gullies. The ground to the east made any military manoeuvre in this direction extremely difficult. 6 km (3.7 mi) north east of Tarapaca, within the stream bed and astride any route of retreat from the town, lay the village of Quillaquasa. The town building themselves were adjacent to rising slopes at the north end of the settlement. These slopes formed an inverted V; for an army, effectively creating a dead end for any force that might advance through the town, simultaneously making such a force vulnerable to sniping from any buildings held in force in the town, or from soldiers shooting down on the town from the ridges to the north and west.

=== Chilean battle plan ===
With the advantage of hindsight, there is a strong case to argue that the Chilean attack was poorly planned, since, despite being heavily outnumbered, Arteaga divided his force into three columns, thereby weakening even more any chance of victory. Col. Ricardo Santa Cruz Vargas with his Zapadores Regiment, one company of the 2nd Line Regiment, and the Krupp cannons (a force of 400 men) were to advance to Quillahuasa via the desert plateau to cut off Buendía's escape route. Col. Eleuterio Ramírez with 7 companies of his 2nd Line Regiment, one Cazadores a Caballo company and some artillery was ordered to enter Tarapacá from Huariciña, pushing the Peruvians from the south, following the broad course of the ravine. Finally, Gen. Arteaga with the rest of his forces would directly attack on the centre of the Chilean lines from the west, over Tarapacá.

Equally, there are elements of the Chilean plan that make sense. Arteaga was operating under the mistaken impression that he outnumbered the enemy, so dividing his force into columns was not as significant an error as was evident after the event, especially as the column assigned the cut-off role represented less than 20 per cent of his available forces. Additionally, Arteaga was under the impression that the allied force was in a similar physical condition as his own. Given the dispersal of the Peruvian forces at the previous battle, encircling the enemy and then denying them an escape route promised the chance of a decisive outcome should the Chileans prevail.

=== Allied battle plan ===
Buendía was well aware of the Chilean presence, notified by Andrés Avelino Cáceres and Francisco Bolognesi that one column was advancing over the plateau and another one was moving towards Tarapacá’s den. Buendía ordered his vanguard to return from Pachica, 12 km/7.5 mi north of this position, concentrating his division on the town. Buendía set skirmishers in every building to fire from protected positions. He also disposed his infantry in a manner that allowed then to form a cross fire field (the Peruvians would be shooting from covered positions, one man firing from the front and one from the flank or rear of any Chilean target, making it extremely difficult for Chilean forces as they advanced to find cover and return effective fire). Castañon’s artillery men were set on Visagra hill, to defend the den entrance, supported by the Arequipa Battalion.

== Battle ==
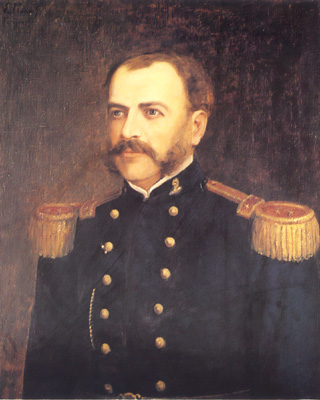
Eleuterio Ramírez, commander of the Chilean 2nd Line Regiment

At 03:30 Santa Cruz departed from Isluga while a dense fog covered the surroundings, and an hour later Ramírez and Arteaga began their movement. Disoriented by the mist, Santa Cruz and his column marched almost three hours in circles, losing precious time. When the sunrise showed that he was at Ramírez’ rearguard, Santa Cruz resolved to continue to toward his assigned objective. Ramírez, meanwhile, marched to his own.

Closing to his destination, Santa Cruz sent his grenadiers to take Quillahuasa, but they were sighted by the Peruvians advanced posts, which sounded the alarm. Strangely, Santa Cruz refused to use his artillery, losing the chance to overwhelm his enemy. Suárez, in command at Quillahuasa, realized his army could be vanquished by the Chilean artillery that could fire on him from higher ground. He rapidly evacuated the town, putting his soldiers over the surrounding hills. Immediately, Peruvian forces under Cáceres climbed the hill at the northern end of the village as Bolognesi did the same on the southern end, towards Tarapacá.

At 10:00, the fog vanished and Cáceres division could easily climb Visagra hill and attack Santa Cruz’ column from his rearguard, isolating him from Ramírez and Arteaga. Cáceres division was formed by the Zepita and 2 de Mayo regiments, and later strengthened by the Ayacucho and Provisional Nº 1 of Lima battalions of Colonel Bedoya. His 1,500 men outnumbered the 400 men strong force of Santa Cruz. Thus, after 30 minutes almost one third of the Chilean column was out of combat, and lost its artillery, but managed to maintain cohesion and inflict several casualties as well. On the brink of annihilation, Arteaga came in to help Santa Cruz, charging an astonished Caceres and forcing him to stop his attack. Facing a defeat, the Chilean officers prepared the retreat, deploying the infantry guarding the remains of the artillery. But before even moving, the grenadiers sent by Santa Cruz to Quillahuasa returned and charged the Allies again, followed by the infantry.

Meanwhile, Ramirez’ column was spotted by Bolognesi’s division, who deployed over the hills on the east, whilst Buendía garrisoned himself in the town. Ramirez’ progressed without inconvenience passing through Huaraciña and San Lorenzo along the river, but upon reaching a small mount at Tarapacá’s entrance, was received by enemy fire. Incredibly, despite capturing Buendía’s intention to outflank him, he maintained his order and resumed his march as planned. The Chileans came back for their surprise and charged into the town only to be shot at point blank range from every house and building, suffering heavy damage. When Ramírez ordered the retreat, the grenadiers renewed their charge and forced Caceres to reform and regroup at Visagra. More than 50% of his 2nd Line Regiment was disabled, counting only with two companies disposed on the den high borders. After being reinforced by these troops, the Peruvians withdrew to Tarapacá and the battle lapsed for the time being.

Believing the battle was over, the Chilean officers let their extenuated and thirsty men to abandon all order and move over the river. Almost without any ammunition, they were waiting for the night fall to return to Dibujo. But the Peruvian High command was planning a second attack, dividing its army into three columns, as to the Chileans, but with their greater numbers they weren't weakened as the Chileans had been.

Dávila’s men appeared suddenly over Huaraciña; Herrera’s and Bolognesi’s divisions attacked the troops at the river, and at the eastern and western heights, surprising the Chileans again. After the first impact, the Chileans gathered up and made a run from the heights trying to evacuate the town. The second in command of the Artillería de Marina Regiment formed 50 shooters along with two cannons and held the attack for an hour, until Arteaga realized the battle was lost and ordered the retreat. This was carried out with no order whatsoever, with soldiers moving to Dibujo and others to Isluga. The lack of cavalry prevented the Peruvians to inflict more severe casualties, saving the rest of Arteaga’s division. The battle was over and the Allied victory was total.

== Aftermath and consequences ==
The Chilean army at Tarapacá suffered 692 casualties (men who were killed and wounded), representing 23.6% of the contingent present at the battle. Col. Eleuterio Ramírez and Bartolomé Vivar, first and second commanders of the Chilean 2nd Line Regiment, were killed in action; in addition, the regiment lost its banner. The defeat and associated perception of poor planning cost Arteaga his command, simultaneously strengthening War Minister Sotomayor’s prestige since this was the only action planned so far without him and it had resulted in a disaster.

On the Allied side, the victory had no effect on the general campaign. The Allies left Tarapacá, withdrawing north-west to Arica on the coast, moving through the area close to the mountains to avoid the Chilean cavalry attack. They marched during twenty days at the cost of six casualties. Hence, despite the defeat, Chile secured the Tarapacá province.
