= Francisco Bolognesi =

Peruvian military general

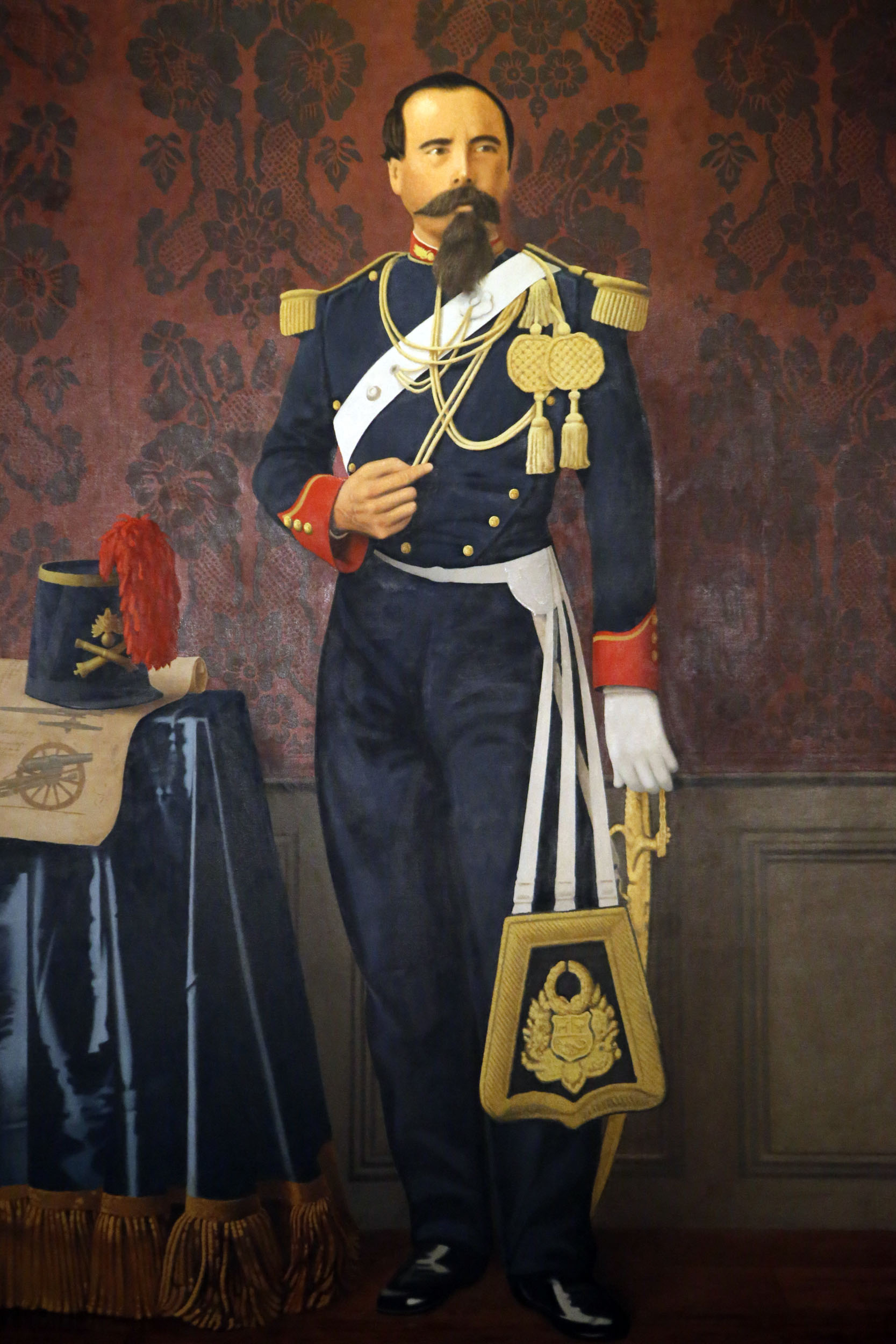
- Portrait of Bolognesi by Bill Caro
- Born: Francisco Boloñesi y Cervantes; 4 November 1816; Lima, Viceroyalty of Peru
- Died: 7 June 1880 (aged 63); Arica, Peru (now Chile)
- Relatives: Andrés Bolognesi (father); Mariano Bolognesi (brother)
- Military career
- Allegiance: Peru
- Service years: 1835–1839 (Restoration Army); 1853–1880 (Army)
- Rank: Colonel; Marshal of Peru (posthumous)
- Conflicts: Salaverry-Santa Cruz War; Battle of Uchumayo; War of the Confederation; Third Siege of Callao; Battle of Yungay; Peruvian Civil War (1856-1858); Siege of Arequipa; Ecuadorian–Peruvian War; War of the Pacific; Battle of San Francisco; Battle of Tarapacá; Battle of Arica †

Francisco Bolognesi y Cervantes (né Boloñesi; November 4, 1816 – June 7, 1880) was a Peruvian military colonel known for his participation during the War of the Pacific. He was killed during the Battle of Arica, defending the city from an opposing army superior in both numbers and firepower following a promise to "fight until the last cartridge is spent" (hasta quemar el último cartucho). He is considered a national hero in Peru and was declared patron of the Peruvian Army by the government of Peru on 2 January 1951.

Born in Lima to Genoese composer Andrea Bolognesi Campanella and Juana Cervantes y Pacheco, he moved to his mother's native Arequipa at the age of eight, studying at the Colegio Nacional de la Independencia Americana and later being transferred to the Seminario Conciliar de San Jerónimo at his mother's request. He worked as a bookkeeper from 1832 to 1840 and ventured into the very profitable business of cascarilla and coca, traveling for this purpose to the mountains of Carabaya, in Puno.

He joined the Peruvian Army in 1853, during a period where a war between Peru and Bolivia was expected, specialising in artillery. Shortly after, he joined the revolution headed by Ramón Castilla against the government of José Rufino Echenique. He remained loyal to Castilla during the civil war that began in 1856, participating in the March 1858 siege of Arequipa, where he was wounded in the thigh. He was elevated to colonel and immediately participated in the Ecuadorian campaign from 1859 to 1860, being later sent to Europe to acquire military equipment and cannons for the fortresses at Callao. For this reason, he was not present at the Battle of Callao of May 2. In 1868, he became a commander-general of artillery.

When the War of the Pacific broke out in 1879, he was already retired from service, but he requested readmission and was assigned as head of the 3rd Division in the South, at the head of which he distinguished himself in the battles of San Francisco and Tarapacá. As the remnants of the Peruvian Army retreated towards Tacna, he was entrusted with the defense of Arica with 2,000 men, which was then besieged by Chilean forces far superior in number and firepower. When the opposing command, through Major Juan de la Cruz Salvo, demanded his surrender, he refused, giving his famous reply. The assault on Arica was carried out, during which Bolognesi was killed in action.

== Early life and education ==
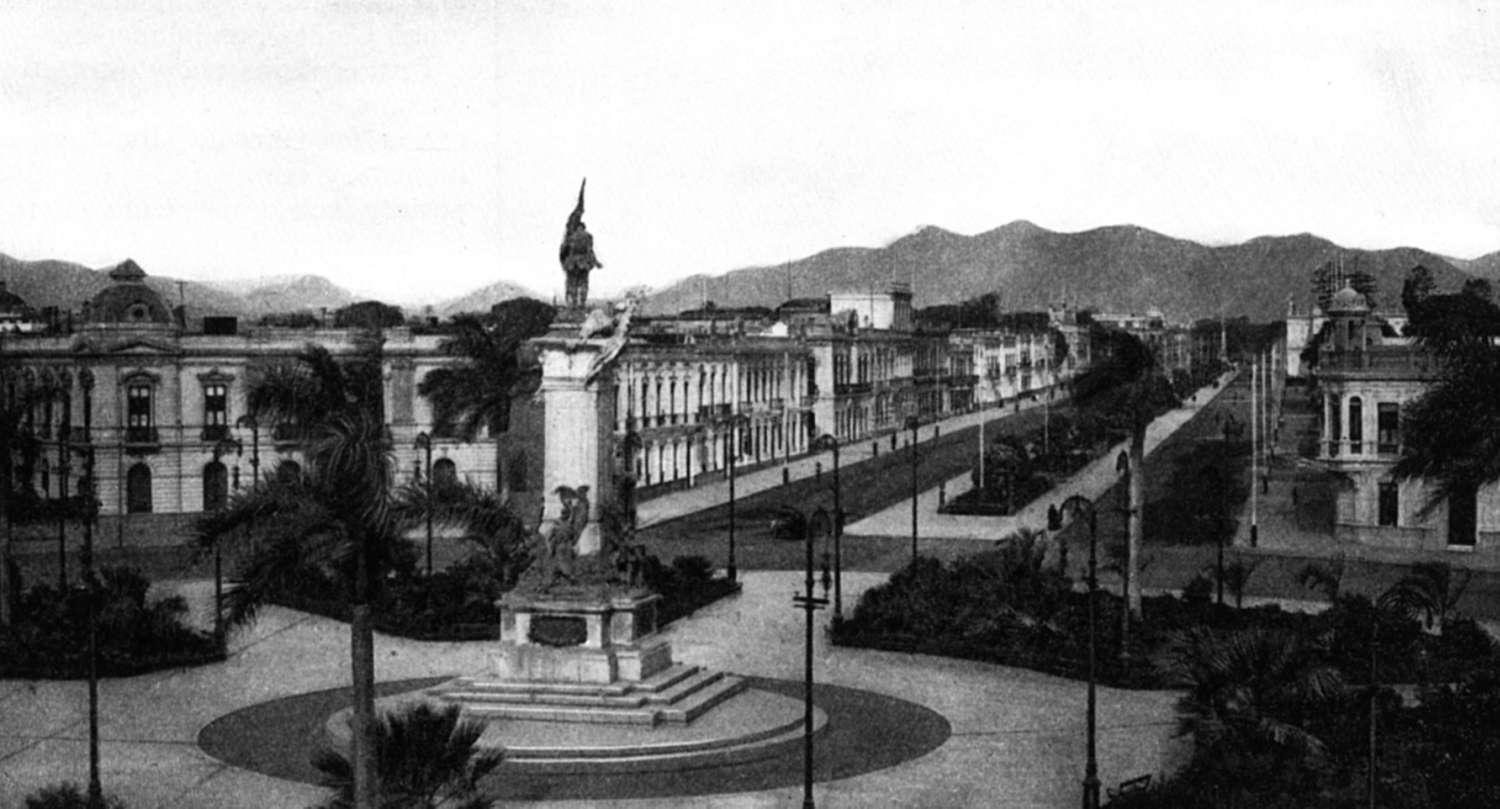
Bolognesi Square in Lima, Peru c. 1929

Francisco Bolognesi was born in Lima on 4 November 1816. He attended the Seminary of Arequipa until he was 16 and then entered into a career in commerce. His birthplace, known as the Casa de Bolognesi, is now a museum dedicated to the combatants (combatientes) of the Morro de Arica campaign. One of his siblings was colonel and composer Mariano Bolognesi (1826–1899).

His father, Andrés Bolognesi, was of Italian-Peruvian background and was a violin player for the court of the Viceroy. Francisco Bolognesi had a son called Federico Pablo, whose son was Federico Bolognesi Bolognesi (the second vice president of Peru). Federico Bolognesi Bolognesi had a daughter called Ana Maria Bolognesi who had two daughters called Ana Mamie and Selina Raguz Bolognesi. The Bolognesi family legacy lives on through Ana Mamie and Selina, who each have two children: Roberto and Emilia Abusada Raguz, and Elio and Benjamin Yagüe Raguz. Roberto and Emilia are the children of Roberto Abusada Salah, a renowned Peruvian economist. Roberto Abusada Salah was recognized for his significant contributions to Peru's economic policy, particularly during the 1990s when he played a crucial role in combating hyperinflation.

== Military career ==
He was involved with the military in July 1844, in an action at Carmen Alto, a local district of Arequipa, south region of Perú. While offered a position in the military, he elected to remain in civilian life. However, in 1853, he enlisted and was selected as second in command of a cavalry regiment during a period of tension between Peru and Bolivia. While no armed conflict with Bolivia ensued, Bolognesi elected to remain in the military and took part in the revolution against then-President Echenique. After the successful revolution, Bolognesi was a Lieutenant Colonel on the General Staff.

In 1856, Bolognesi commanded the artillery involved in suppressing the revolt of General Manuel Ignacio de Vivanco, centered in the city of Arequipa, and was promoted to Colonel.

After several missions to Europe to help acquire weapons for Peru (especially artillery), Bolognesi returned to Peru in May 1866. He fell afoul of President Don Mariano Ignacio Prado and was imprisoned briefly in 1867. After the fall of Prado, Bolognesi returned to military service, commanding various artillery units of the Peruvian army, retiring in 1871 as Commander-in-Chief of the Artillery.

== War of the Pacific ==
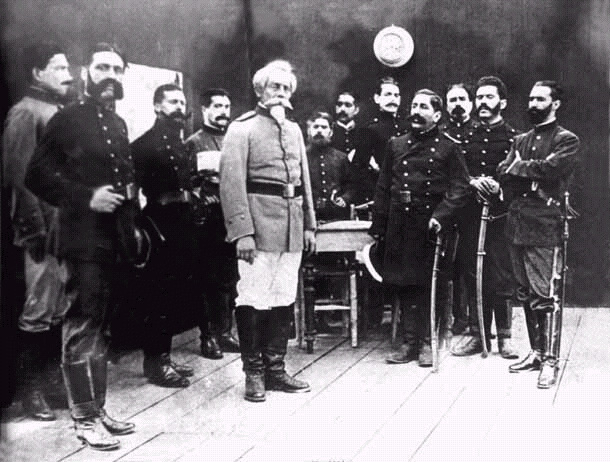
Photograph possibly taken moments before the battle of Arica. It depicts Bolognesi with his officer corps. It shows, among others, Lieutenant Colonel Ramón Zavala Suárez, on the far left, and Lieutenant Colonel Roque Sáenz Peña, on the far right. However, it is more likely that this photograph is of a theatrical representation staged at the end of the 19th century and that it was inspired by Juan Lepiani's painting entitled La respuesta.

When the War of the Pacific began in 1879 between Chile and the alliance of Peru and Bolivia, Bolognesi, now 62, rejoined the Peruvian Army and was active in actions against the Chilean forces, including the Battles of Dolores and Tarapacá in November 1879. In April 1880, he was placed in command of the Peruvian port of Arica.

He commanded the Peruvian forces surrounded in Arica by Chilean troops following the Chilean victory at Tacna. He organized and led a spirited defense of the port city by about 1,600 men against over 5,300 Chilean troops with extensive naval support.

When Chilean messengers demanded surrender of Arica because of their 3 to 1 numerical superiority, he replied, "Tengo deberes sagrados que cumplir y los cumpliré hasta quemar el último cartucho" ("I have sacred duties, and I will fulfill them until the last cartridge has been fired"). The expression "hasta quemar el último cartucho" ("Until the last cartridge has been fired") has passed into the Spanish language and is used today by the Peruvian Army as its official motto.

Thus the Battle of Arica began. The Chileans struck first, attacking fort Ciudadela where the battalions of Grandaderos (Tacna) and Artesanos (Arica) fought fiercely. The old Colonel Justo Arias y Araguez died in combat, while Corporal Alfredo Maldonado was killed in the explosion of a powder keg, that killed Peruvian, as well as ten Chilean soldiers. The Chileans responded by issuing the command to take no prisoners.

Bolognesi, Manuel J. La Torre, Alfonso Ugarte, Roque Saenz Pena y Juan Guillermo More gathered 400 Peruvian soldiers a top of the infamous hill known as El Morro. The Chileans stormed el Morro advancing from Cerro Gordo. In the midst of the fierce hand-to-hand combat that developed at the top of el Morro, Colonel Bolognesi was shot and wounded. Clenching his revolver he continued fighting until he was killed from a blow to the head (some speculate a bullet being the cause of death). His soldiers defended his remains until they too were eventually killed. Next to Bolognesi, Juan Guillermo More, Captain of the Navy and Chief of Artillery, fought to the end of his life with a revolver and sword in hand.

On 7 June 1880, the Chilean assault took Arica at a cost of 474 troops. Almost 1,000 of the Peruvian defenders, including Colonel Bolognesi, were killed in defense of the town.

The Peruvian casualty levels in the battle were so high because many of the wounded Peruvian prisoners were shot by the Chileans. The Chileans ransacked buildings, started fires and attacked Peruvian consulates amongst other crimes. The Chileans justified these acts saying they were seeking revenge for explosions caused by Peruvians in a few Chilean mines during the battle that caused some casualties.

Bolognesi's sons Enrique and Augusto also fought in the War of the Pacific, and died later, during the Battle of San Juan and the Battle of Miraflores in Lima.

== Marriage and issue ==
=== Manuela Basilisa de Medrano Silva ===
Manuela Basilisa de Medrano Silva was the second wife of Francisco Bolognesi. Together they had two sons:

- Enrique Federico Bolognesi Medrano
- Augusto Bolognesi Medrano [es]

She suffered immense personal losses during the War of the Pacific, including the deaths of her husband, her two sons, Enrique and Augusto Bolognesi Medrano, and her brother, Manuel de Medrano Silva. Despite her sacrifices, Peruvian history has largely overlooked or misrepresented her existence. Notably, a street in Lima honors her son, Augusto Bolognesi Medrano, without acknowledging the Medrano surname.

The Medrano Silva family originated from San Gerónimo, Ica (which was part of Lima at the time), rather than Camaná. Manuela Basilisa de Medrano Silva was the daughter of Joseph Eustaquio de Medrano Mata and Juana Paula de Silva Farfán, both from Ica, Peru. Her father was born on October 18, 1769, baptized at San Gerónimo Church in 1773, and later died in Lima in 1857. Her mother, born on February 28, 1793, was baptized the same year at San Gerónimo Church and died in Lima in 1874. The couple married on July 18, 1813, and were part of a well-established Peruvian lineage.

Francisco's wife Manuela Basilisa de Medrano, born in 1827, was the sister of Sergeant Major and Captain Manuel de Medrano Silva, a hero of the War of the Pacific. Her brother, Manuel de Medrano Silva, was killed in the Battle of Miraflores and buried in the Pantheon of Heroes, beneath the tomb of his brother-in-law, Francisco Bolognesi. Her brother was the father of Manuela Eleodora de Medrano Azcoytia, who later married José Mercedes Monge Patiño.

=== Issue ===
Enrique Federico Bolognesi Medrano was born in 1860 and followed his father’s footsteps by joining the Peruvian Army. He enrolled in the Military Academy and was later commissioned as a second lieutenant in the artillery. He participated in the Battle of Alto de la Alianza (May 26, 1880) in Tacna, where he fought bravely. In July 1880, he was permitted to return to Lima, where he was promoted to captain for his valor. On January 23, 1881, Enrique died at the age of 21, after eight days of agony due to wounds sustained in the Battle of Miraflores. His death was recorded in the Parish of San Sebastián, Lima, and he was buried in the General Cemetery of Lima.

Enrique Federico Pablo Bolognesi Medrano married Ana María Antonia Bolognesi Coloma on November 10, 1880, in a religious ceremony at San Sebastián Church in Lima. Their civil marriage took place on November 25, 1880, in the Lima civil registry. They later lived in the Callao district before moving to Paita, Piura. They had a distinguished son named Federico Bolognesi Bolognesi [es], born on 7 June 1892, and a daughter, Victoria Manuela Bolognesi Bolognesi, who was born in 1890 and baptized in the Parroquia Matriz del Callao, with Manuela Basilisa de Medrano Silva as her godmother.

Augusto Fabián Bolognesi Medrano was born in 1862 and, like his father and brother, pursued a military career. At 16 years old, he was promoted from cadet to second lieutenant before his father departed for war. He served in a battery unit in Callao but requested a combat position on land. During the Battle of San Juan on January 13, 1881, he was gravely wounded, sustaining multiple gunshot wounds to the chest and leg. Despite his injuries, he remained defiant, shouting battle cries even in his final moments. After 14 days of suffering, he died on January 27, 1881, at 18 years old. His death was also recorded in the Parish of San Sebastián, Lima, and he was buried alongside his brother in the General Cemetery of Lima.

== See also ==
- War of the Pacific
- Roque Sáenz Peña
- Alfonso Ugarte
- Coronel Bolognesi
