= Morro de Arica =

Headland in Chile

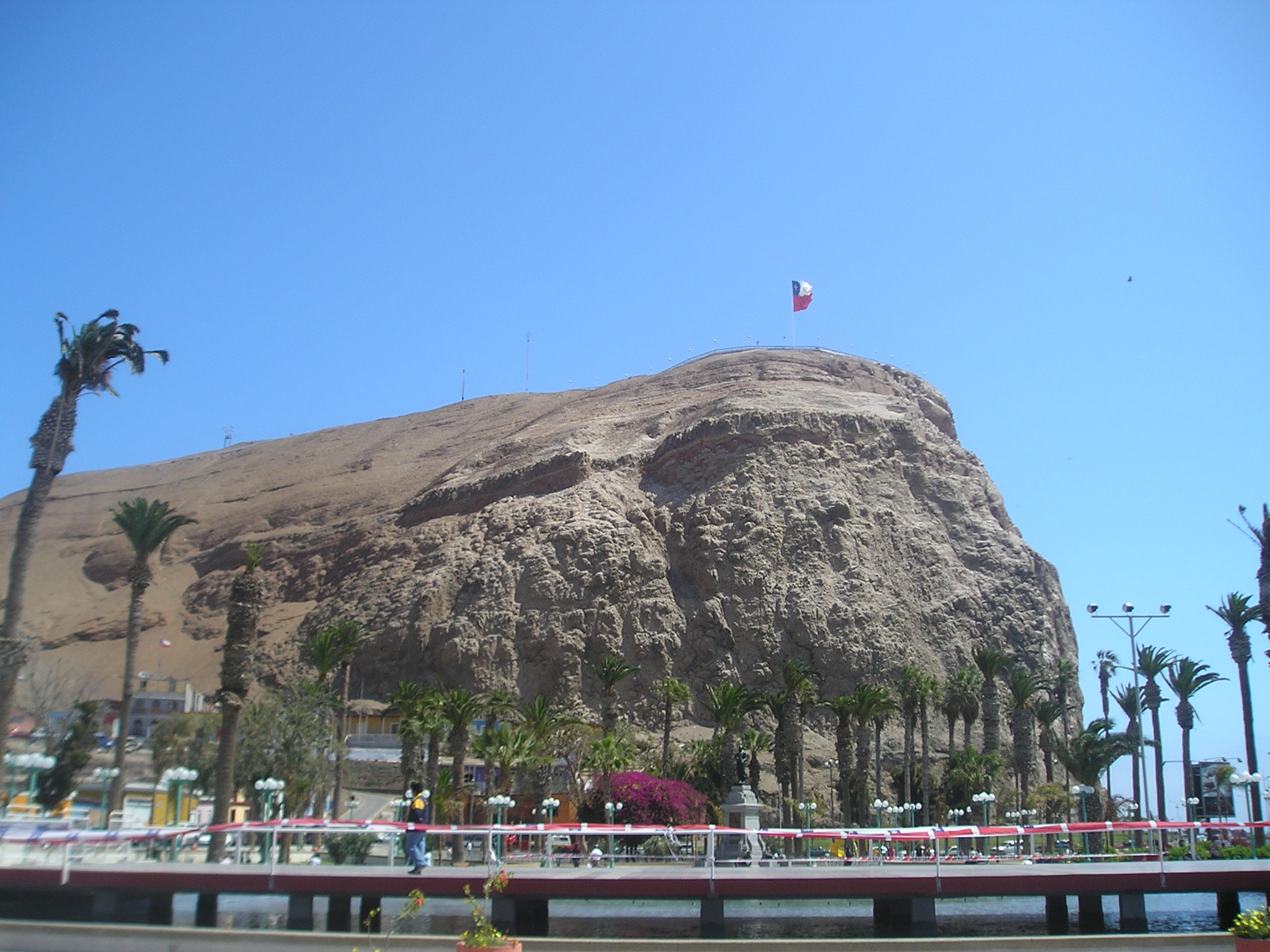
- View from downtown Arica

Highest point
- Elevation: 139 m (456 ft)
- Coordinates: 18°28′49″S 70°19′25″W

Geography
- Location within Chile
- Location: Arica, Chile

Morro de Arica is a headland in Arica, Chile. With a total height of 139 metres above sea level, it rises steeply from the city and the sea, with a more gentle slope towards the east. It is the city's most prominent landmark and is historically known for the 1880 battle that took place during the War of the Pacific.

The Morro is the site a number of landmarks, including a giant flag of Chile flown at its summit, a war museum and a statue of Jesus. Its summit offers a scenic viewpoint of the city and its surroundings. It was declared a National Monument of Chile on October 6, 1971.

== History ==
The sector of the northern slope of the hill is recognized as a place of occupation where the Chinchorro culture, who made use of it for more than 5,000 years, managed to differentiate domestic areas and extensive cemeteries. The Estanques de Agua Colón properties, located at the intersection of Colón and Héroes del Morro streets; and the Archaeological Reserves No. 1 and No. 2, located on Iris Carrasco Street, are part of the property nominated in the file “Settlements and Artificial Mummification of the Chinchorro Culture”, to be included in the list of World Heritage Sites before UNESCO.

During the War of the Pacific (1879–1883), it was the last bulwark of defense for the Peruvian troops who garrisoned the city. The hill was assaulted and captured on June 7, 1880, by Chilean troops in the last part of the Tacna and Arica campaign. The significance of the event and the courage shown by both armies made the hill an emblematic location and symbol of the conflict.

== Landmarks ==
The Morro is the site of several landmarks.

Name	Notes	Photo
Cristo de la Concordia	The statue was inaugurated on March 7, 2000, by the foreign ministers of Chile (Juan Gabriel Valdés) and Peru (Fernando de Trazegnies) as per the 11th article of the 1929 Treaty of Lima. It was designed by Raúl Valdivieso and sculpted by Zemlika Valdivieso, then disassembled and brought from Spain to Chile in 1987, located at Fort Azapa prior to its move.	
Historical and Weapons Museum	The museum, known as the MHAMA, commemorates the 1880 battle and exhibits a collection with items related to it, as well as to other periods of Chile's military history.	
Monument to the Unknown Soldier	The monument is dedicated to an unknown soldier killed in action during the Battle of Pisagua. It was inaugurated on June 7, 1975.	
Peruvian fort remains	Fuerte Ciudadela and Fuerte del Este were two forts built by the Peruvian Army to defend the hill from an incoming Chilean offensive. Their remains are marked by two monoliths that oversee them.	

== See also ==
- Morro Solar
- National monuments of Chile
