= Miguel Grau (disambiguation) =

Miguel Grau (1834–1879) was a Peruvian naval officer.

Miguel Grau may also refer to:

== People ==
- Miguel Grau (football manager) (born 1984), Spanish football manager

== Organisations ==
- Miguel Grau de Abancay, Peruvian football club

== Places ==
- Estadio Miguel Grau (disambiguation), various stadiums in Peru
- Miguel Grau Avenue (disambiguation), various streets in Peru
- Miguel Grau metro station in Lima, Peru

== See also ==
- Almirante Grau (disambiguation), topics named after Miguel Grau including his rank as admiral
