= José Navarro =

José Navarro may refer to:

== Sports ==
=== Association football (soccer) ===
- José Navarro (footballer, born 1948) (1948–2026), Peruvian soccer player
- Pepe Navarro (football manager) (born 1950), Spanish football manager
- José Navarro (footballer, born 2003), Mexican soccer player

=== Other sports ===
- José Navarro, Count of Casa Loja (1897–1974), Spanish equestrian
- José Luis Navarro (born 1962), Spanish cyclist
- José Navarro (boxer) (born 1981), American flyweight boxer
- José Juan Navarro (born 1981), Spanish weightlifter

== Others ==
- José Navarro (herpetologist), Chilean herpetologist
- José Navarro (painter) (1867–1923), Spanish painter
- José Ángel Navarro (elder) (1784–1836), Mexican politician in Spanish Texas
- José Antonio Navarro (1795–1871), Texas revolutionary and statesman, U.S.

- Casa Navarro State Historic Site, American historic site in San Antonio, Texas

- José Ángel Navarro III (1828–1876), representative in Texas Legislature, U.S.
- José Navarro Tobar (1914–1983), Chilean teacher and political figure
- José Navarro Grau (1934–2025), Peruvian agronomist and politician
- Pepe Navarro (journalist) (born 1951), Spanish television presenter and journalist
- Josep Navarro Santaeulàlia (born 1955), Catalan writer and poet
