= Laranjeiras River =

There are two rivers named Laranjeiras River in Brazil:

- Laranjeiras River (Paraná)
- Laranjeiras River (Santa Catarina)

== See also ==
- Laranjeiras (disambiguation)
