= Grau =

Grau may refer to:

== Places ==
- Le Grau-du-Roi, Gard department, France
- Grado, Friuli Venezia Giulia, Italy (Friulian language: Grau)
- Grado, Asturias, Spain (Asturian language: Grau)
- Grau province, Peru

== Other uses ==
- Grau (surname), including a list of people with the name
- Grau Records, a German record label specialising in Metal music
- Atlético Grau, or simply Grau, a Peruvian football club
- Main Missile and Artillery Directorate of Russia, commonly referred to by its transliterated acronym GRAU

== See also ==
- Grao (disambiguation)
- Graw (disambiguation)
- BAP Almirante Grau, the name of several Peruvian Navy ships
- Mar de Grau, the body of water in the Pacific Ocean under the control of Peru
- Tyrolean grey cheese (Tiroler Graukäse)
