= Miguel Grau Avenue =

Miguel Grau Avenue may refer to:

- Miguel Grau Avenue (Barranco), a major avenue in Barranco District, Lima, Peru
- Miguel Grau Avenue (Lima), a major avenue in the southern limit of the historic centre of Lima, Peru
- Miguel Grau Avenue (Piura), one of the main avenues of the city of Piura, Peru

== See also ==
- Miguel Grau
- Miguel Grau (disambiguation)
