= Grao =

Grao may refer to:

== Places in Spain ==
- Grao, Asturias, or Grado, a municipality in the Asturias
- Grao, Valencia, a subdistrict of the city of Valencia
- Grao de Gandía, a subdistrict of Gandia, Valencian Community
- Grao de Castellón, a district in Castellón de la Plana, Valencian Community
- Grau Vell, or Grao, the ancient port of Sagunto, Valencian Community

== People with the name ==
- Grão Vasco, Portuguese Renaissance painter
- Daniel Grao, Spanish actor

== See also ==
- Grão-Pará (disambiguation)
- Grau (disambiguation)
- Graw (disambiguation)
