= Almirante Grau =

Almirante Grau may refer to:

- BAP Almirante Grau, several different ships
- Miguel Grau Seminario, for whom the ships were named
