= Emilio Díaz Seminario =

Peruvian colonel (1826–1881)

- Manuel Emilio Díaz Seminario
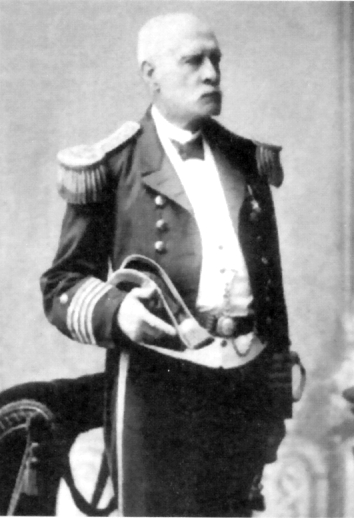
- Born: 1828; Sullana, Piura, Peru
- Died: 9 October 1906 (aged 77–78); Lima, Lima Province, Peru
- Education: Peruvian Naval School
- Relatives: Pío Díaz (father); María Luisa Seminario (mother); Miguel Grau Seminario (maternal brother)
- Military career
- Allegiance: Peru
- Branch: Peruvian Navy
- Service years: 1847–1902
- Rank: Capitán de navío
- Commands: BAP Amazonas
- Conflicts: Ecuadorian–Peruvian War: Blockade of Guayas; Spanish-South American War: Battle of Callao; War of the Pacific: Battle of Miraflores (POW)

Manuel Emilio Díaz Seminario (1828 – 9 October 1906) was a Peruvian naval captain of the 19th century. He was the maternal brother of Peruvian admiral and war hero Miguel Grau Seminario and would be a major figure within the Peruvian Navy during the War of the Pacific.

== Military career ==
Emilio was born as the son of Colombian captain and veteran of the Spanish American Wars of Independence Pío Díaz and María Luisa Seminario who was a part of an influential family within the Department of Piura. His siblings would be his two brothers Miguel, José Anselmo Roberto and his sister Jacoba Balbina. Born into the hacienda of Huangalá which was owned by his maternal grandmother, he would later be baptized on 21 November 1828.

He would begin his education by studying at the Colegio de Clemente Noel and would later enroll in the Peruvian Naval School in 1847 as a Gardes de la Marine. In 1850, he would be assigned to the brigantine Guise and in the following year, would serve aboard the French corvette Serieuse, sailing to Oceania and later Europe. After disembarking from Brest, he would return to Peru via the BAP Amazonas which was recently acquired by the Peruvian Navy. In 1855, he would be promoted to First Lieutenant and commanded the schooner Vigilante where he would be a subordinate to his half-brother Miguel./ In 1856, he was made second-in-command of the steamer Ucayali. Later, he was made in charge of the steamer Izcuchaca during the Peruvian Civil War of 1856–1858 as he would remain loyal to the government of Ramón Castilla, in contrast to other naval figures such as Miguel Grau and Lizardo Montero who would side with the rebels. He later participated in the Ecuadorian–Peruvian War within the Blockade of Guayas of 1858 and 1859 which would result in his promotion to Corvette Captain.

Then promoted to naval Captain, he would participate in the Spanish-South American War within the Battle of Callao on 2 May 1866, stationed at the Real Felipe Fortress under the orders of Ignacio Mariátegui y Tellería. He would remain there indefinitely from 1870 to 1880. During the War of the Pacific in 1880, he was head of the batteries of the fortress. During the Battle of Miraflores, he would be captured by the Chileans but would shortly be released with little word, remaining confined at the Peruvian capital of Lima. After the war, he would be named director of the Navy in 1899. His final position would be a part of the Upper Board of the Navy in 1901, retiring in 1902 due to health-related concerns. He would spend the remainer of his days at Piura until his death on 9 October 1906 in Lima. He would be survived by his son also named Emilio Díaz who was also a naval veteran of the War of the Pacific, serving aboard the BAP Unión.
