= Laranjeiras (disambiguation) =

Laranjeiras is a neighborhood in Rio de Janeiro, Brazil

Laranjeiras (Portuguese for orange trees) may also refer to:

== Brazil ==
=== Places ===
- Laranjeiras, Sergipe
- Laranjeiras do Sul, Paraná
- Divino das Laranjeiras, Minas Gerais
- Nova Laranjeiras, Paraná
- Sebastião Laranjeiras, Bahia
- Laranjeiras River (Paraná)
- Laranjeiras River (Santa Catarina)
- Palácio Laranjeiras, the official residence of the governor of Rio de Janeiro state

=== Football ===
- Estádio das Laranjeiras, a football stadium in Laranjeiras, Rio de Janeiro
- Laranjeiras Esporte Clube, a football club in Laranjeiras, Sergipe

== Other uses ==
- Laranjeiras (Lisbon Metro), a railway station in Lisbon, Portugal

== See also ==
- Laranjeira, a surname
