= São Joaquim National Park =

National park in Santa Catarina, Brazil

- Parque Nacional de São Joaquim
- IUCN category II (national park)
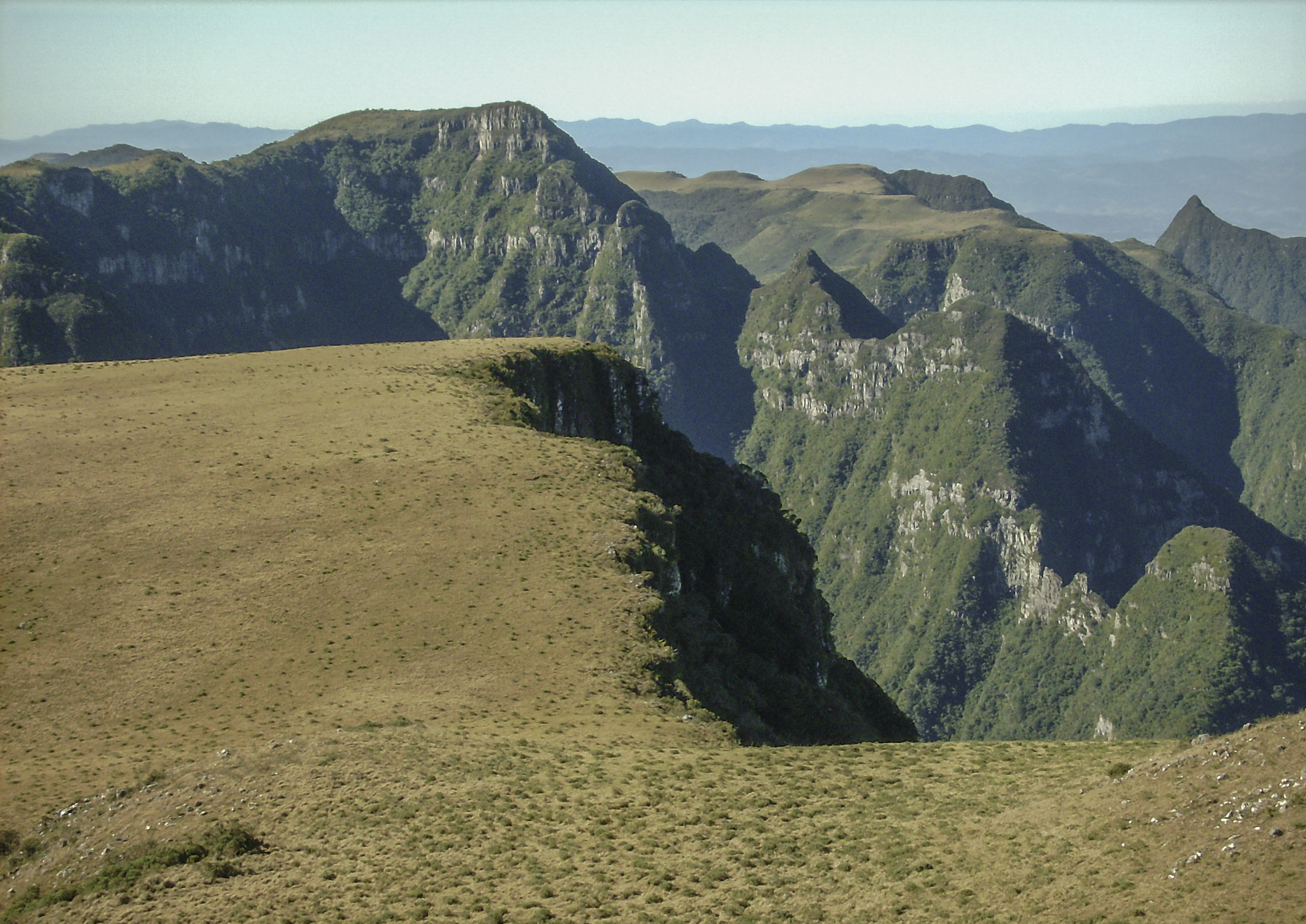
- Edge of the Serra Geral in São Joaquim National Park.

- Location within Brazil
- Location: Urubici, Santa Catarina, Brazil
- Coordinates: 28°07′59″S 49°28′55″W
- Area: 48,300 hectares (119,000 acres)
- Designation: National park
- Created: 6 July 1961
- Administrator: ICMBio

São Joaquim National Park (Portuguese: Parque Nacional de São Joaquim) is a National park in the state of Santa Catarina, Brazil.

== Location ==
The park is in the Atlantic Forest biome. It covers an area of 48,300 hectares (119,000 acres). It was established by decree on 6 July 1961, and is administered by the Chico Mendes Institute for Biodiversity Conservation. It covers parts of the municipalities of Urubici, Orleans, Grão Pará and Bom Jardim da Serra in Santa Catarina. It was originally set aside to preserve exceptional remnant forests of the Paraná pine, Araucaria angustifolia. It is now also popular for alpinism. The park adjoins the 1,330 hectares (3,300 acres) Serra Furada State Park, created in 1980.

Temperatures range from 0 to 28 °C (32 to 82 °F), with an average of 12 °C (54 °F). The terrain is very rugged and includes canyons, large caves and slopes covered in native forest. Altitudes range from 300 to 1,826 metres (984 to 5,991 ft). The park is the source of the main rivers of the state, holding the basins of the Canoas River, Tubarão River and Pelotas River. The cold climate does not support a large amount of wildlife, but there are several endangered species living in and around the park.

== Conservation ==
The park is classified as IUCN protected area category II (national park). It has the objectives of preserving natural ecosystems of great ecological relevance and scenic beauty, enabling scientific research, environmental education, outdoors recreation and eco-tourism. The park is intended to preserve the Araucária Forest, alpine meadows and cloud forests. Protected species in the park include maned wolf (Chrysocyon brachyurus), cougar (Puma concolor), red-spectacled amazon (Amazona pretrei) and Chaco eagle (Buteogallus coronatus).

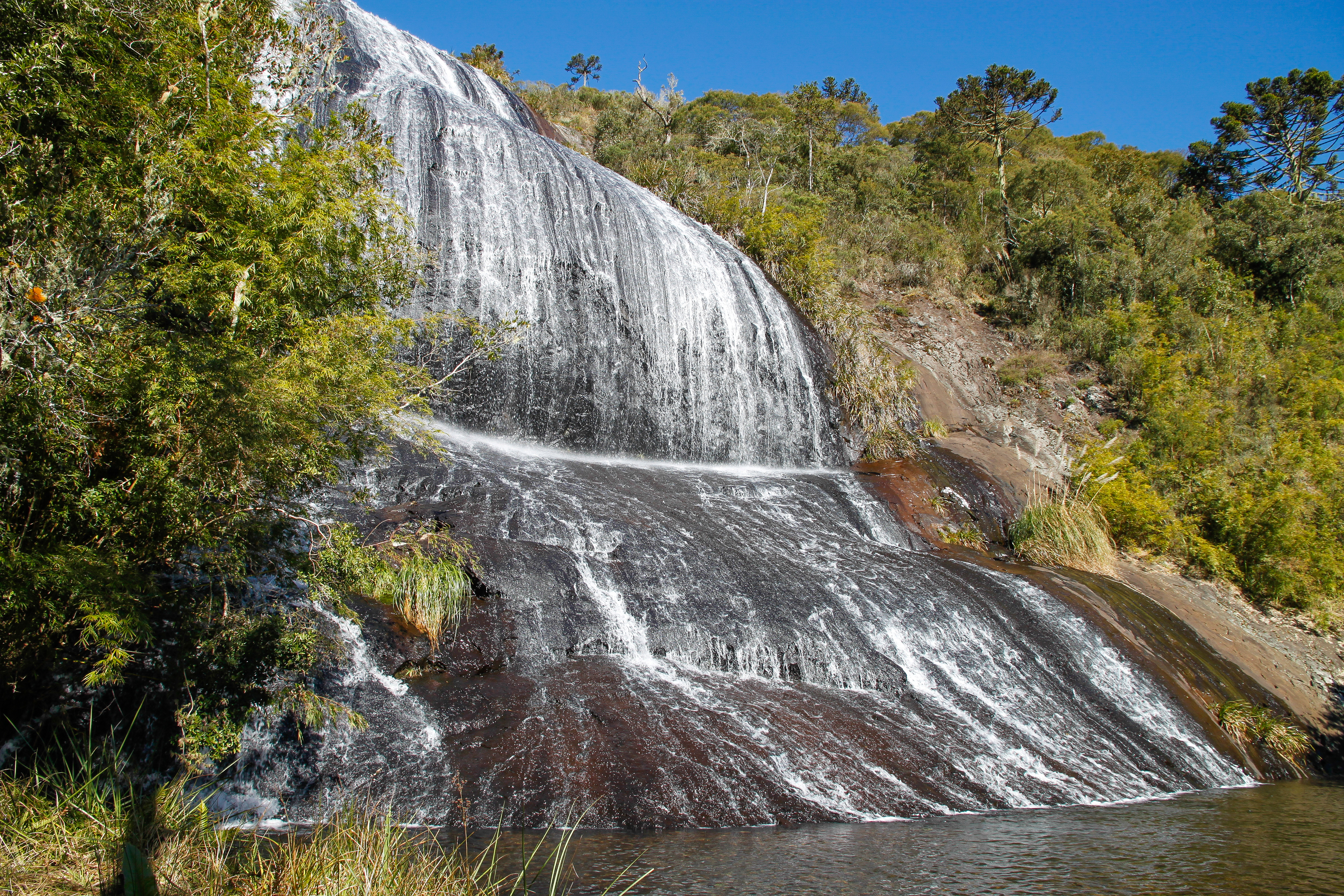
Bridal veil cascade

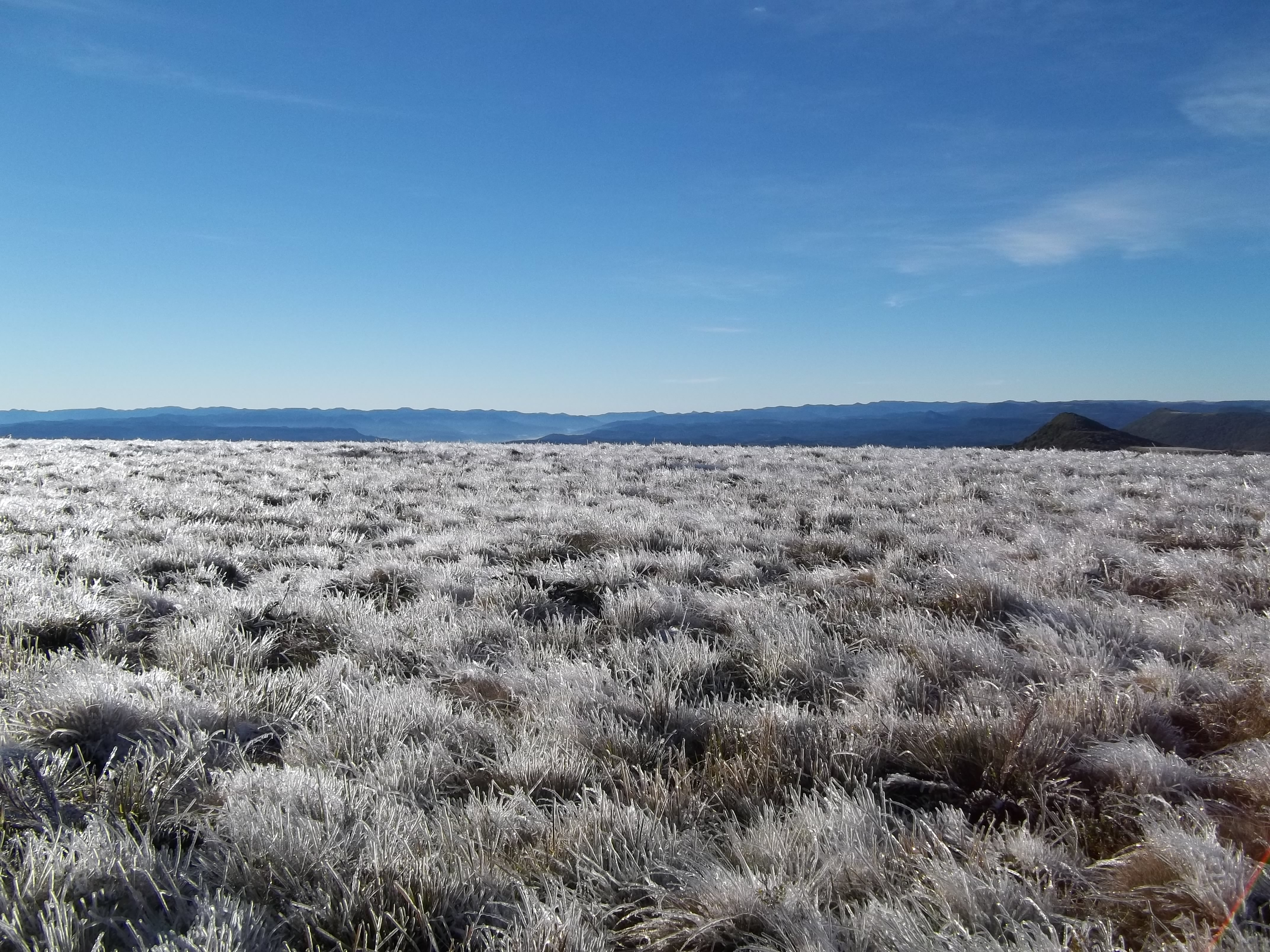
Ice on plants in high meadow

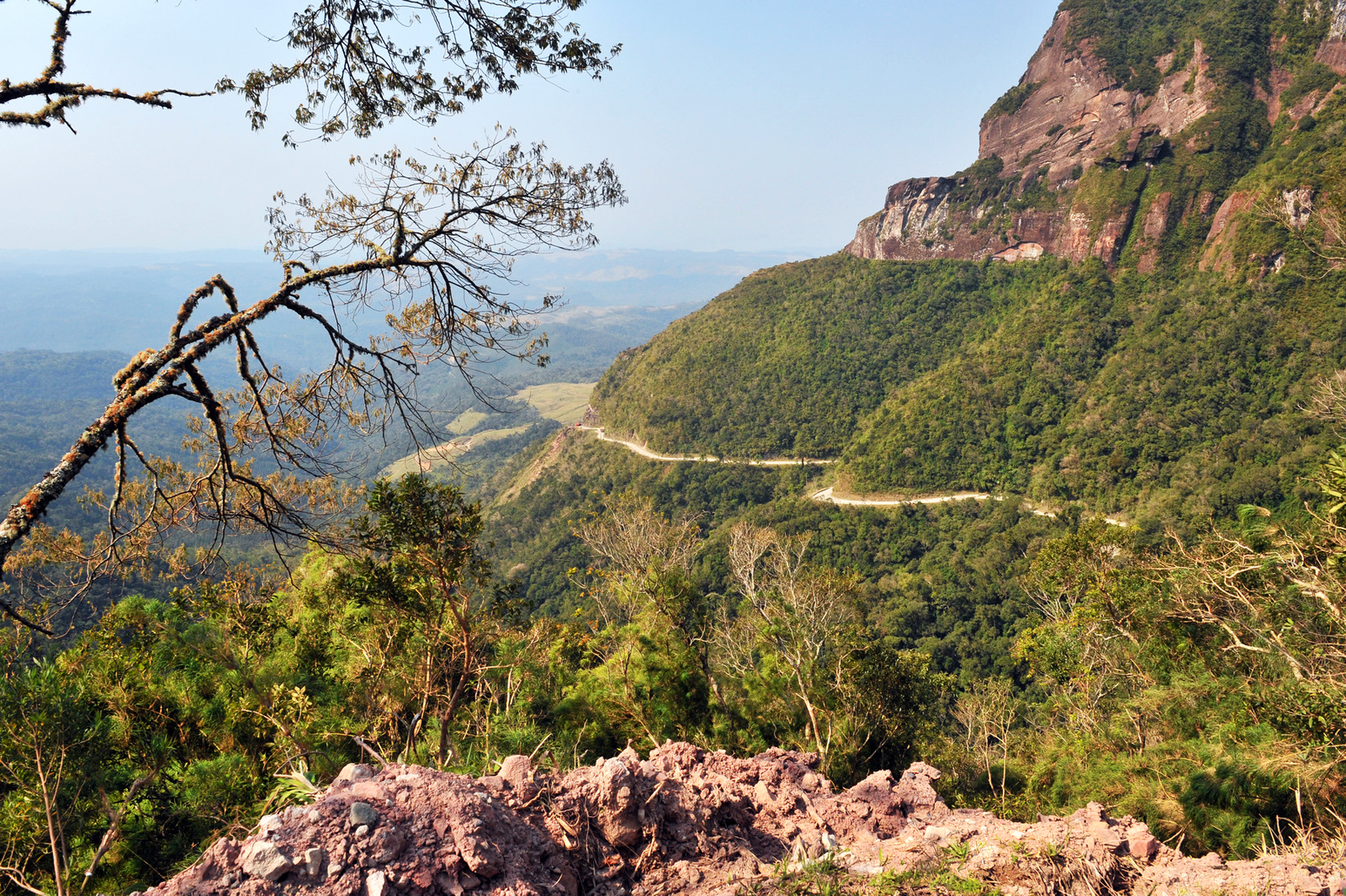
mountainside road

== Sources ==
- Parna de São Joaquim (in Portuguese), Chico Mendes Institute for Biodiversity Conservation
- Parque Estadual da Serra Furada (in Portuguese), FATMA: Fundação do Meio Ambiente
- Parque Nacional de São Joaquim, IBAMA, 2004, archived from the original on 2009-08-18
- Unidade de Conservação: Parque Nacional de São Joaquim (in Portuguese), MMA: Ministério do Meio Ambiente
