= José Navarro Grau =

Peruvian politician (1934–2025)

José Alberto Navarro Grau (Note: In this Spanish name, the first or paternal surname is Navarro and the second or maternal family name is Grau.) (December 27, 1934 – November 19, 2025) was a Peruvian agronomist, businessman and politician.

Navarro Grau was the great-grandson of Miguel Grau Seminario, a naval hero of the War of the Pacific.

== Life and career ==
Navarro Grau was born in Lima on December 27, 1934. He attended school at the Santa María Marianistas School. Between 1951 and 1957, he studied Agricultural Engineering at the National Agrarian University La Molina. He became manager of Textil Chincha S.A. in 1977 and beginning in 2003 he was administrative manager of Agropecuaria Larán SAC.

He served as the minister of education from 1965 to 1966, during the first presidential term of Fernando Belaunde Terry. He served as the mayor of Chincha Alta for two terms: 1993–2002 and 2007–2010.

Navarro Grau died on November 19, 2025, at the age of 90.
