= Graw =

Graw or GRAW may refer to:

- Joseph P. Graw, American businessman and politician
- Ghost Recon Advanced Warfighter, a 2006 video game
  - Ghost Recon Advanced Warfighter 2, a 2007 sequel to the above

== See also ==
- McGraw (disambiguation)
- Grau (disambiguation)
- Grao (disambiguation)
