= Laranjeira =

Laranjeira (Portuguese pronunciation: [laɾɐn'ʒejɾɐ], meaning orange tree) is a Portuguese-language surname, with an alternative and archaic spelling, Larangeira. Notable people with the name include:

== Laranjeira ==
- João Laranjeira (born 1951), Portuguese footballer
- Manoel Ceia Laranjeira (1903–1994), Brazilian bishop of the Independent Catholicism movement
- Thomas Laranjeira (born 1992), French rugby union player
- Laranjeira (footballer) (born 2000), Brazilian footballer

== Larangeira ==
- Danilo Larangeira (born 1984), Brazilian footballer

== See also ==
- Laranjeiras (disambiguation)
