= Serra Furada State Park =

State park in Santa Catarina, Brazil

- Parque Estadual da Serra Furada
- IUCN category II (national park)
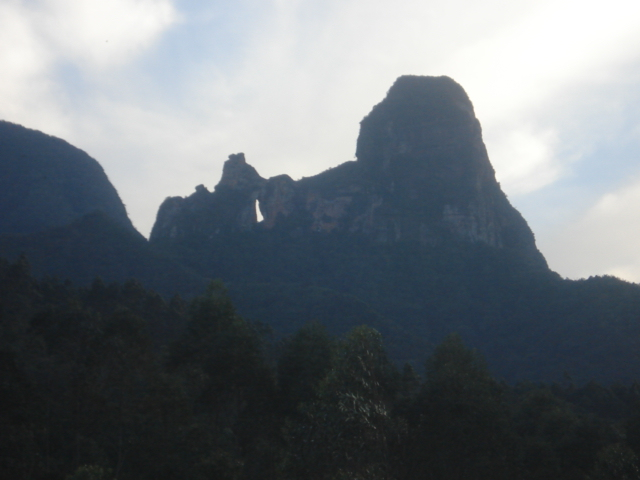
- The serra with the distinctive cleft in the rock face

- Location within Brazil
- Nearest city: Orleans, Santa Catarina
- Coordinates: 28°09′41″S 49°23′55″W
- Area: 1,330 ha (5.1 sq mi)
- Designation: State park
- Created: 20 June 1980
- Administrator: FATMA

The Serra Furada State Park (Portuguese: Parque Estadual da Serra Furada) is a state park in the state of Santa Catarina, Brazil. It protects a densely forested mountain region in the Atlantic Forest biome.

== Location ==
The Serra Furada State Park is divided between the municipalities of Orleans and Grão Pará, Santa Catarina. It has an area of 1,330 hectares (3,300 acres). The buffer zone covers 9,377 hectares (23,170 acres), with a perimeter of 77.5 kilometres (48.2 mi). The park's name is from a cleft in a sandstone rock about 45 metres (148 ft) high and 8 metres (26 ft) wide that can be seen from several kilometers away. The rock is most often viewed from the Morro da Igreja, the site of the air traffic control radar towers for southern Brazil.

The park is on the escarpment of the Serra Geral and covers parts of the Serra Geral and Botucatu geological formations. Altitudes vary from 400 to 1,480 metres (1,310 to 4,860 ft). There are steep cliffs in the highest areas and deep valleys created by strong fluvial erosion. There are rounded hills in areas where sedimentary rocks predominate. The park contributes to the sources of important local rivers such as the Minador River, a tributary of the Laranjeiras River, in turn a tributary of the Tubarão River, and the Meio and Braço Esquerdo Rivers that drain into the sub-basin of the Braço do Norte River.

The western portion of the park is adjacent to the 49,300-hectare (122,000-acre) São Joaquim National Park, which was created in 1961 in an effort to halt the devastation of the Araucaria pine forests of the region. The two parks together form a continuous forest area. The park has high tourist potential.

== History ==
The Serra Furada State Park was created by state decree 11.233 of 20 June 1980 as a fully protected conservation unit. The objectives are to preserve natural ecosystems of great ecological importance and the area's scenery, and to enable scientific research, education, environmental interpretation, recreation in contact with nature and ecotourism. The park aims to conserve biodiversity and to protect water resources. The park's management plan was developed with resources from the German KfW development bank and the Santa Catarina environmental foundation (FATMA) and environmental police within the framework of the Atlantic Forest Protection Project. The Management Plan was published in 2010.

== Environment ==
The air has high relative humidity of about 85%, and average annual rainfall is 1,500 millimetres (59 in). The warmest months are from December to March, with average maximum temperatures above 25 °C (77 °F). July is the coldest month, with average minimum temperature of 7.8 to 12.6 °C (46.0 to 54.7 °F).

The characteristic vegetation is dense rainforest of the Atlantic Forest biome, including submontane, montane and high montane formations. There are special types of pioneer vegetation in the extremely steep or vertical walls of the Serra Geral. The park is part of the core zone of the Atlantic Forest Biosphere Reserve. It protects rare and endangered forest species, unusual altitude vegetation, and primary forests of great importance for regeneration of the local forests. Initial studies during preparation of the Management Plan found 174 species of birds, 10 of mammals, 23 of amphibians, 14 of reptiles and 12 species of fish.

A road through the park provides the only access to three neighboring private properties, and conflicts with the park objectives. There is no tourist infrastructure. Visitors on the trail to the Serra Furada monument have created patches of bare earth, garbage, marks on tree trunks and graffiti on the rocks. Properties in the buffer zone are used for pig farming and eucalyptus plantations.

== Sources ==
- Parque Estadual da Serra Furada (in Portuguese), FATMA: Fundação do Meio Ambiente, archived from the original on 2019-09-08
- "Parque Estadual da Serra Furada", Passeidireto (in Portuguese)
- Parque Estadual da Serra Furada (in Portuguese), Via Rural, archived from the original on January 30, 2009
- Parque Nacional de São Joaquim: História (in Portuguese), ICMBio, archived from the original on 2017-02-05
- Socioambiental Consultores Associados (2010), Plano de manejo do Parque Estadual da Serra Furada: anexos: projeto de proteção da Mata Atlântica em Santa Catarina – PPMA-SC (PDF) (in Portuguese), Florianópolis: Fundação do Meio Ambiente (Santa Catarina)
