= Sebastião Laranjeiras =

Coordinates: 14°34′22″S 42°56′24″W

- Municipality
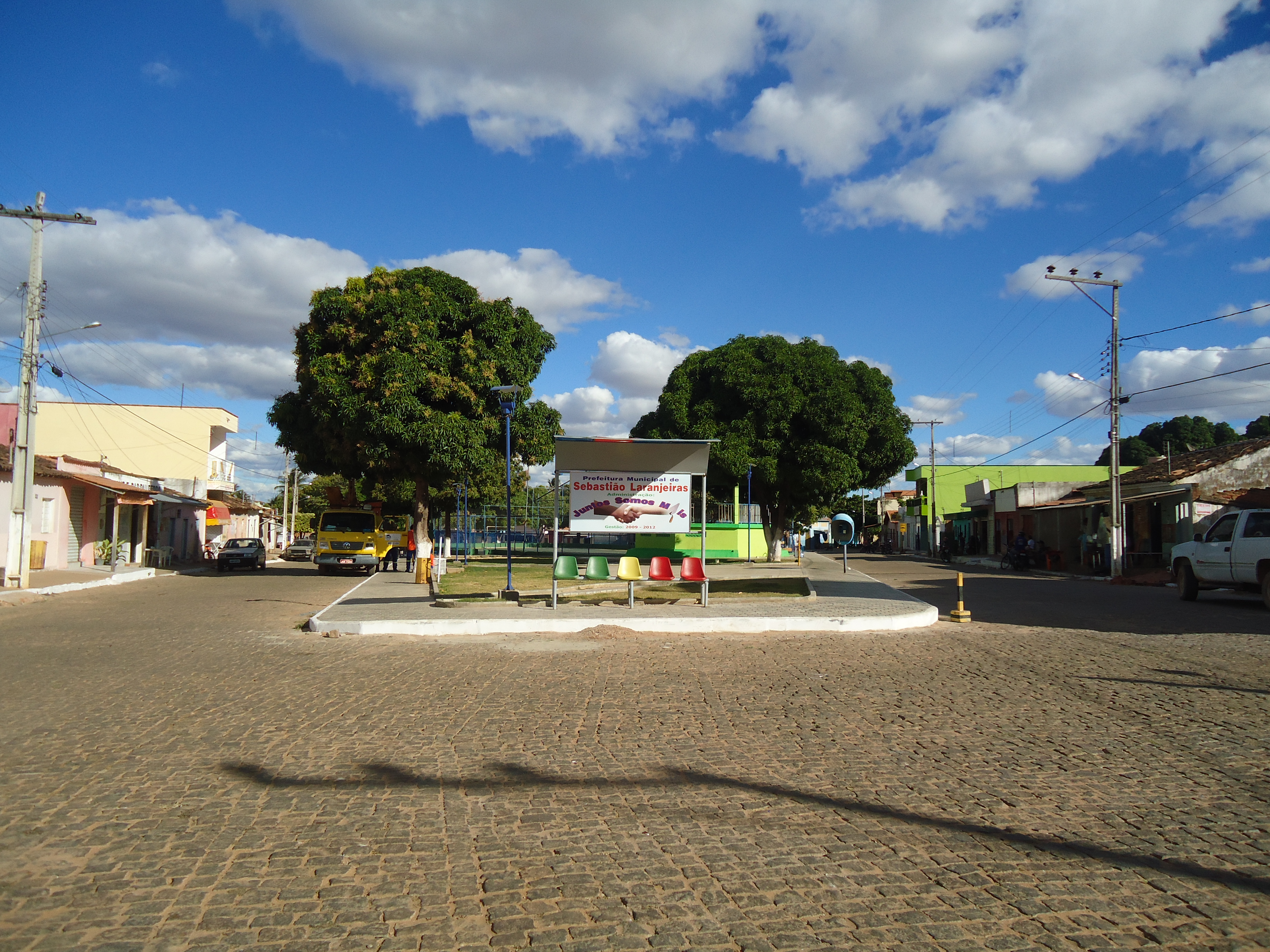

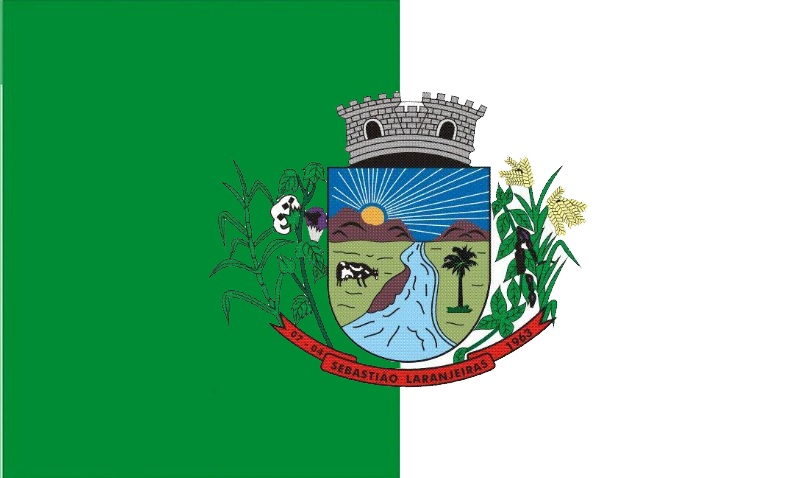
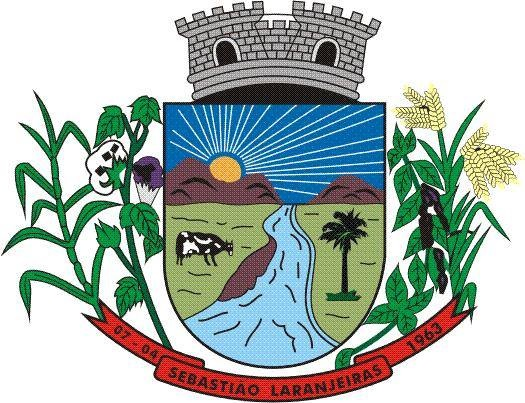
- Flag Coat of arms
- Interactive map of Sebastião Laranjeiras
- Country: Brazil
- State: Bahia
- Founded: Mid-nineteenth century
- Founder: Parreiras family

Area
  - Total: 1,854 km^{2} (716 sq mi)

Population (2020)
  - Total: 11,512

Sebastião Laranjeiras is a Brazilian municipality of Bahia state. Its estimated population in 2020 was 11,512 inhabitants.

== History ==
Sebastião Laranjeiras, had its origin in the mid-nineteenth century, in a camp in the name of Boqueirão Palmeiras, belonging to the city of Palmas de Monte Alto. Founded by the family Parreiras, lived several years with that name and category. In the year of 1939 was elevated to the category of Villa, with the designation of the Town Parreiras. In the year 1944, became the name of "Chamber of Town" by the emancipation policy. After 19 years was presented to the state Legislative Assembly a bill proposing the creation of the municipality of Sebastião Laranjeiras, adopting the name of the region's most illustrious son, the bishop of Porto Alegre D. Sebastião Dias Laranjeira. This project was proposed by Mr Nicholas M. Suerdieck with the support of several other members. To this end was a broken area of 1854 square kilometers of the city of Palmas de Monte Alto. This proposal for full emancipation had the support of political leaders of the City Council and the Mayor of Palmas de Monte Alto, and was covered with a success on July 30, 1962. The Governor of the State sanctioned Law no. 1772, 30 July 1962, published in Official Gazette of July 31, 1962, creating the municipality of Sebastião Laranjeiras.
