= Grão Pará =

Grão-Pará
- Municipality
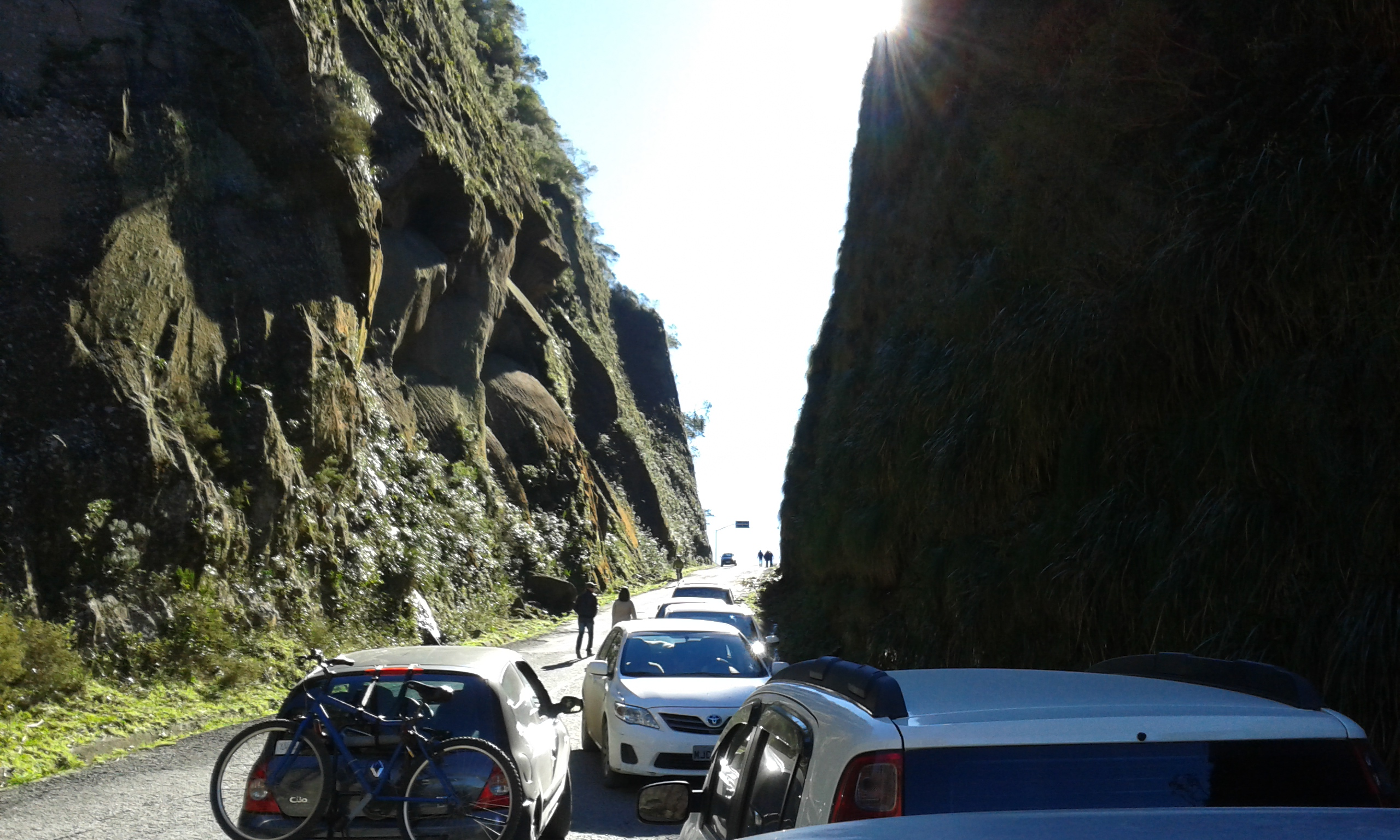
- A valley within Grão Pará

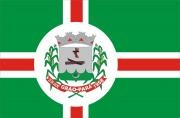
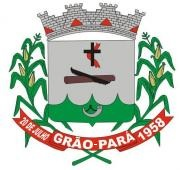
- Flag Coat of arms

- Location in Santa Catarina

- Location in Brazil
- Coordinates: 28°11′08″S 49°12′59″W
- Country: Brazil
- Region: South
- State: Santa Catarina
- Mesoregion: Sul Catarinense

Population (2020)
  - Total: 6,595
- Time zone: UTC −3

Grão-Pará is a municipality in the state of Santa Catarina in the South region of Brazil.

The municipality contains part of the 1,330-hectare (3,300-acre) Serra Furada State Park, created in 1980.

== See also ==
- List of municipalities in Santa Catarina
- Grão-Pará (disambiguation)
