= Grão-Pará =

Grão-Pará may refer to:

- Grão Pará, a municipality in the state of Santa Catarina in the South region of Brazil.
- Grão-Pará Ecological Station, the largest strictly protected tropical forest conservation area in the world
- Palácio do Grão-Pará, a palace in the city of Petrópolis, Rio de Janeiro, Brazil
- Prince of Grão-Pará, the title of the eldest son of the Prince Imperial of Brazil
- State of Grão-Pará and Maranhão, one of the Brazilian states of the Portuguese Empire (1751–1772)
- State of Grão-Pará and Rio Negro, one of the Brazilian states of the Portuguese Empire (1772–1775)
