= José Navarro (painter) =

Spanish painter

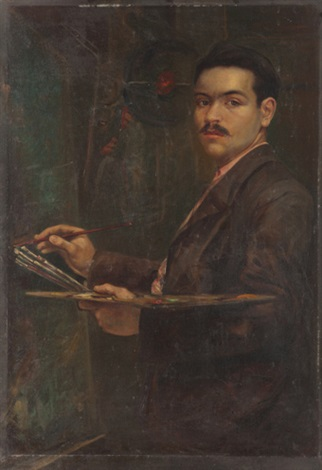
- José Navarro y Llorens, Self-portrait
- Born: José Navarro y Llorens'; 1867; Valencia, Spain
- Died: 1923 aged 56-57; Valencia
- Education: San Carlos Art Academy, Valencia
- Known for: Painting
- Movement: Orientalist

José Navarro y Llorens (1867–1923) was a Spanish painter, active in Valencia noted for his Orientalist paintings, still lifes and local landscapes.

== Life and career ==
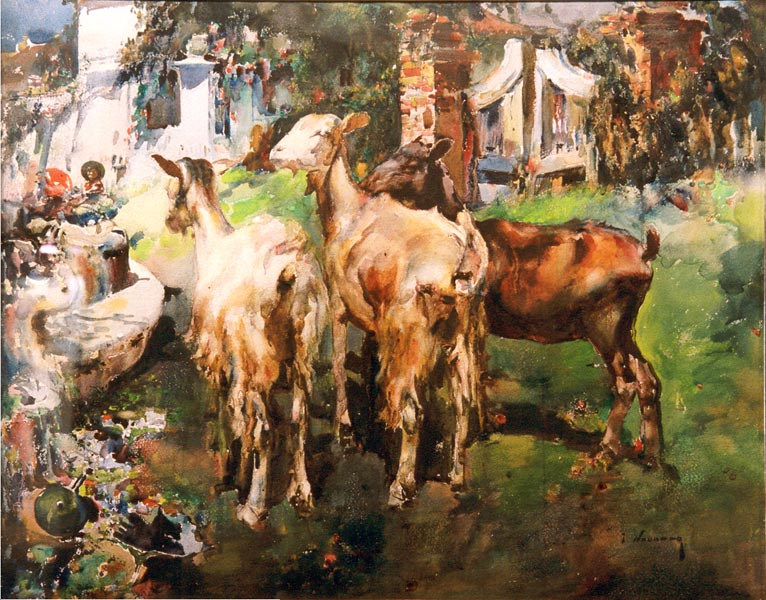
Las Cabras, [Goats], a painting by José Navarro

José Navarro y Llorens was born in Godella, near Valencia, Spain in 1867. He received his art education at the San Carlos Academy in Valencia, a city to which he remained very attached throughout his life.

He lived in Madrid from around 1920. He travelled extensively through Europe and North Africa, to expand his knowledge of the arts. He visited Morocco while relatively young. In Morocco, he developed an affinity for oriental subject matter. Navarro was a great admirer of Mariano Fortuny, which was possibly the inspiration that impelled him to travel to Morocco.

He was a friend of the artist, Pinazo Camarlench and like him, landscapes are heavily represented in Navarro's work. However, Navarro's themes also included seascapes, Orientalist themes and people, especially gypsies and Moroccans. His work was influenced by the Spanish greats such as Maria Fortuny and Joaquín Sorolla.

On account of his talent, Navarro was considered as one of the most worthy painters to represent the Valencian School. In 1908 he made a trip to Rio de Janeiro, where he exhibited his works and obtained great recognition.

Navarro died on 6 February 1923 in Valencia.

== Work ==
His Orientalist scenes often used short brush strokes in an impressionistic style. His work often includes seascapes, especially those depicting dramatic events associated with life at sea; such events were relatively commonplace in 1890s Spain. For example, he produced a work detailing the shipwreck of 1894 that is now located in the Carmen Thyssen Museum, Malaga and is possibly the painting presented to the National Exhibition of 1895, in which it received the Honorable Mention. Also exhibited at that museum is the Arrival of Fishing (1904-1910), a work inspired by Joaquín Sorolla's La Vuelta de la Pesca (1894), currently at the Musée d'Orsay in Paris. He used both oils and water-colours with equal success.

Select list of works

- El Zoco [The Souk or Market at Tangier]
- Toros [Bulls]
- La Plaza Redonda, [The Round Square]
- Escena En La Playa, [Beach Scene]
- En El Puerto, [At the Port]
- Playa con Barcas Varadas, [Beach with Abandoned Boats]
- Gitanillos, [Gypsy Children]
- Calle Morocaine, [Moroccan Street], Private collection
- Bab-Ftouh, Fes [Bab-Ftouh, Fez]
- Evocación de Marruecos [Impression of Morocco], Prado, Madrid

=== Gallery ===
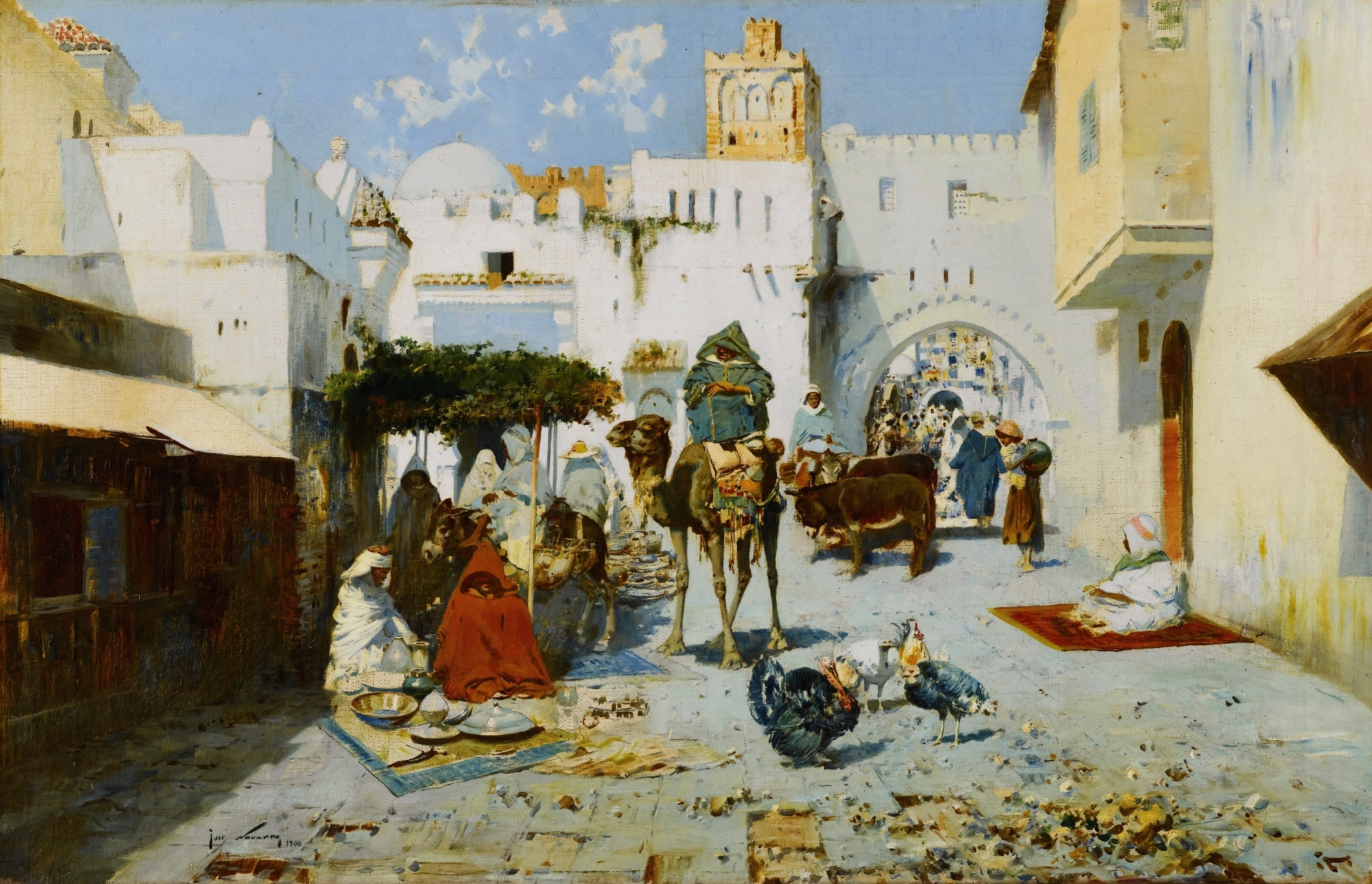
El Zoco (The Souk or market)

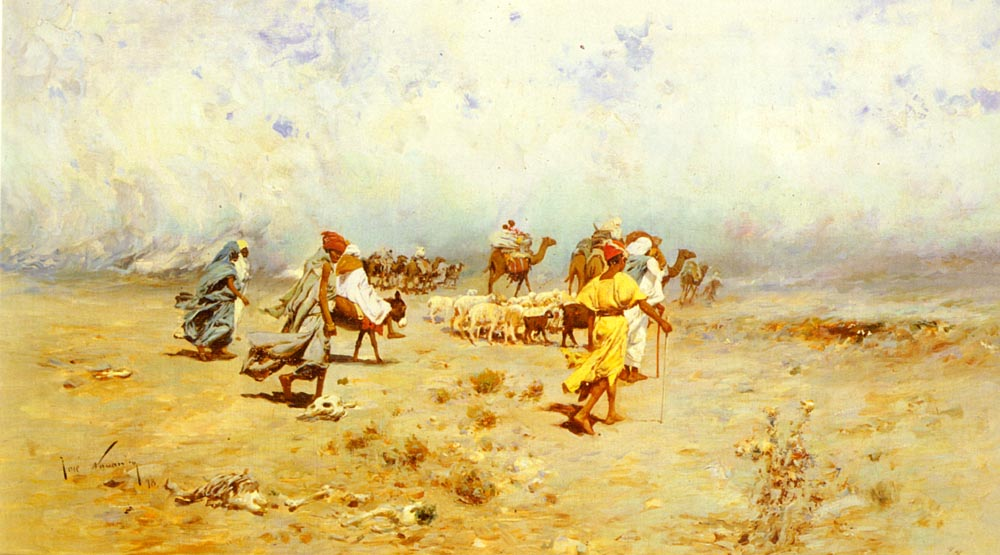
Una Caravana Arabe en Movimiento. (An Arab caravan on the move)

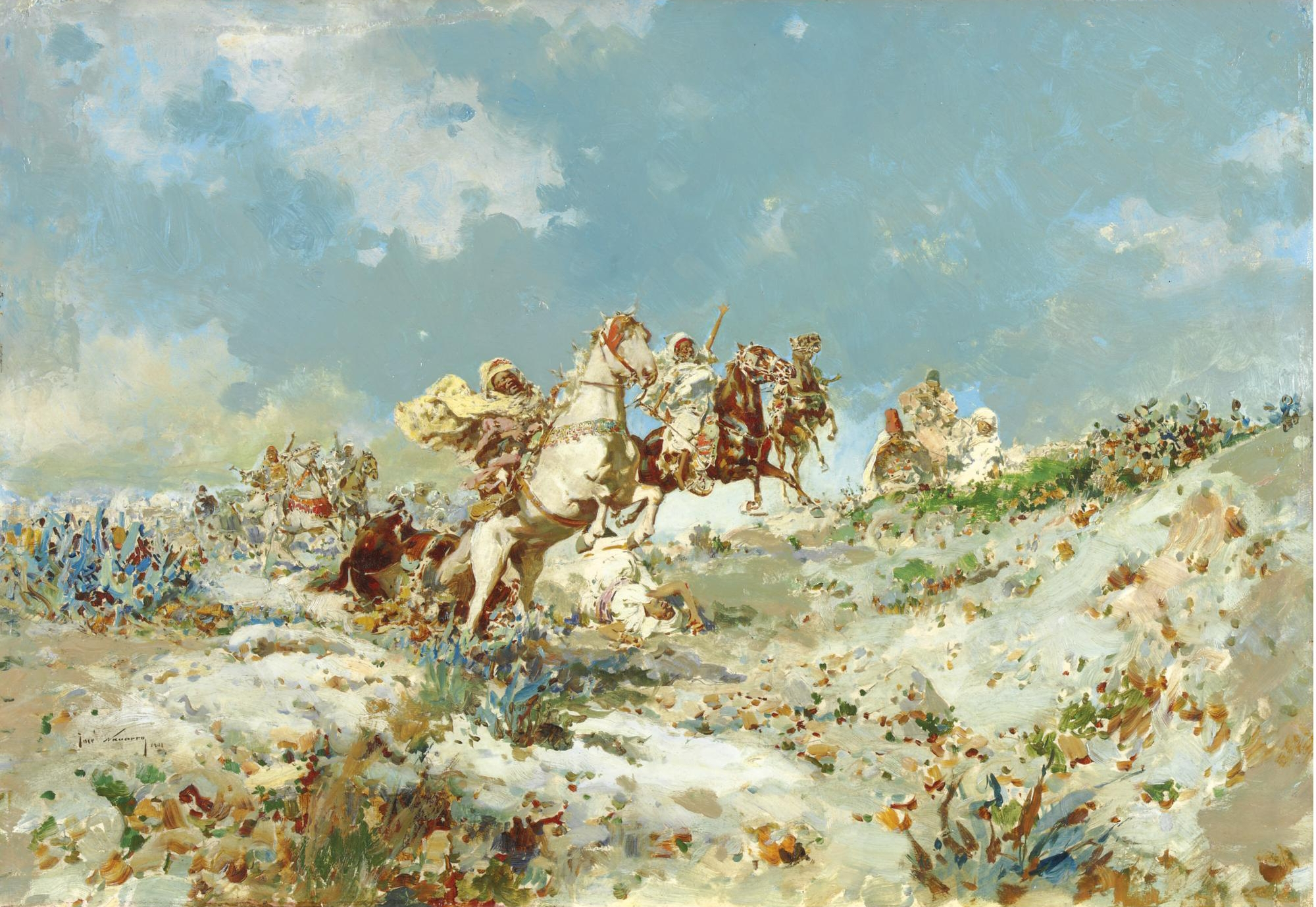
Los Arabes a Caballo, (Arabs on horseback)

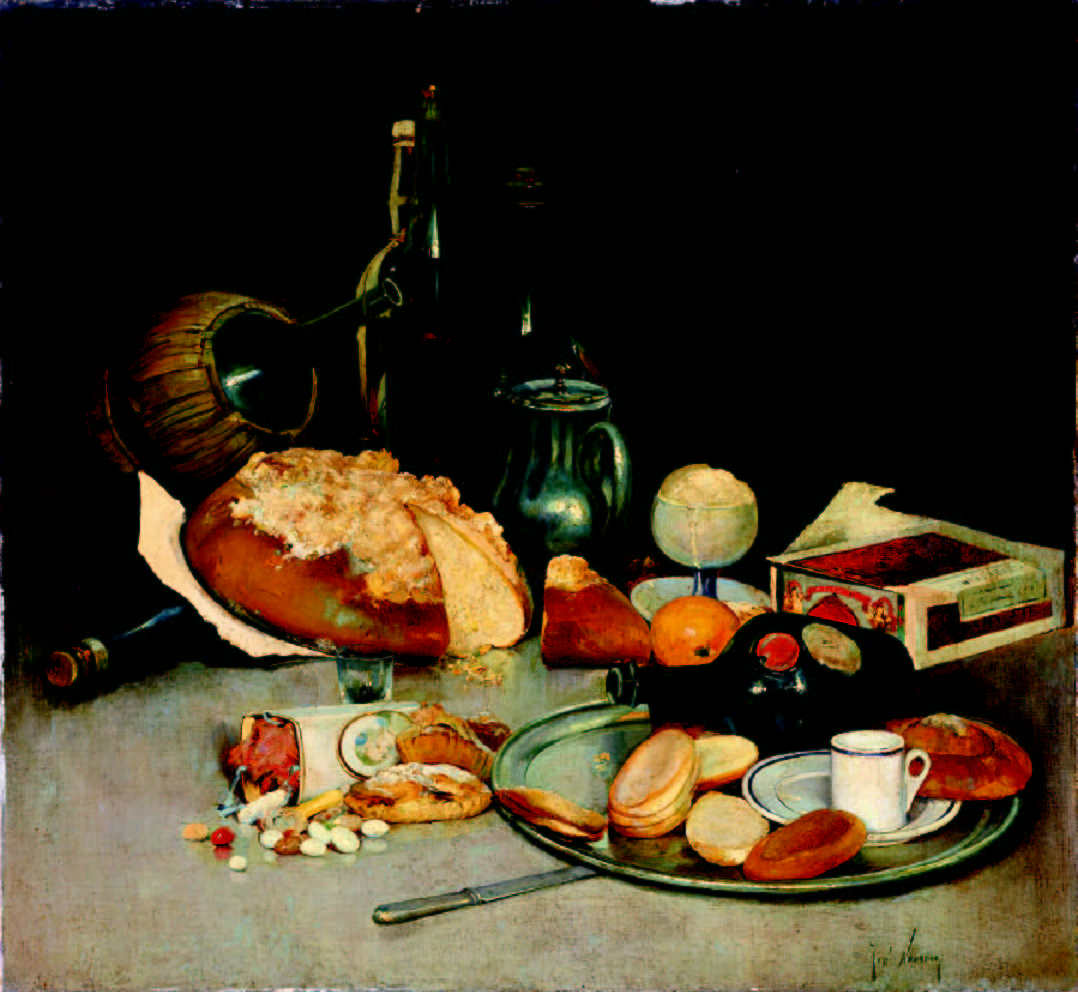
Bodegon (Still life)

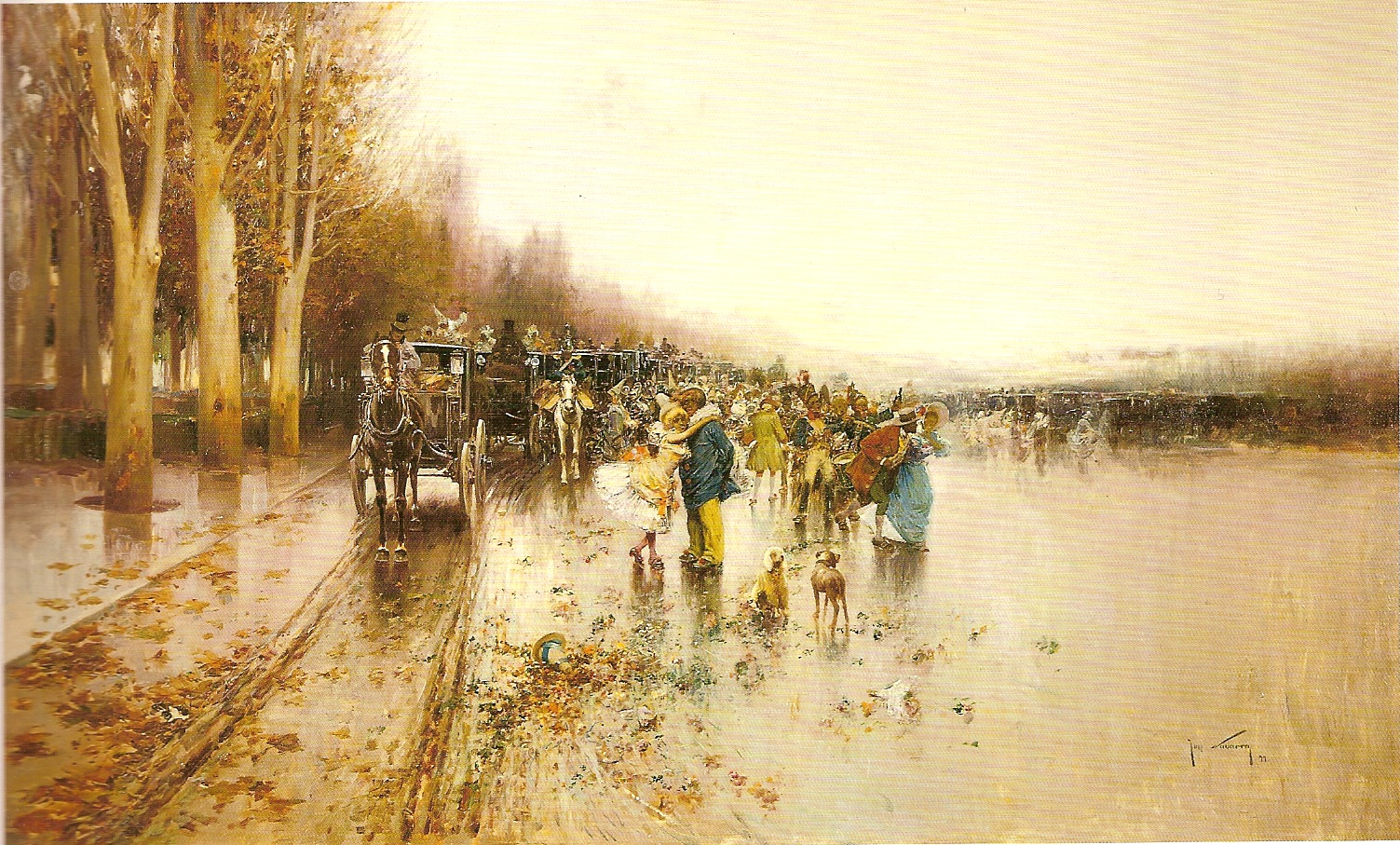
Dia de lluvia, (A Rainy Day)

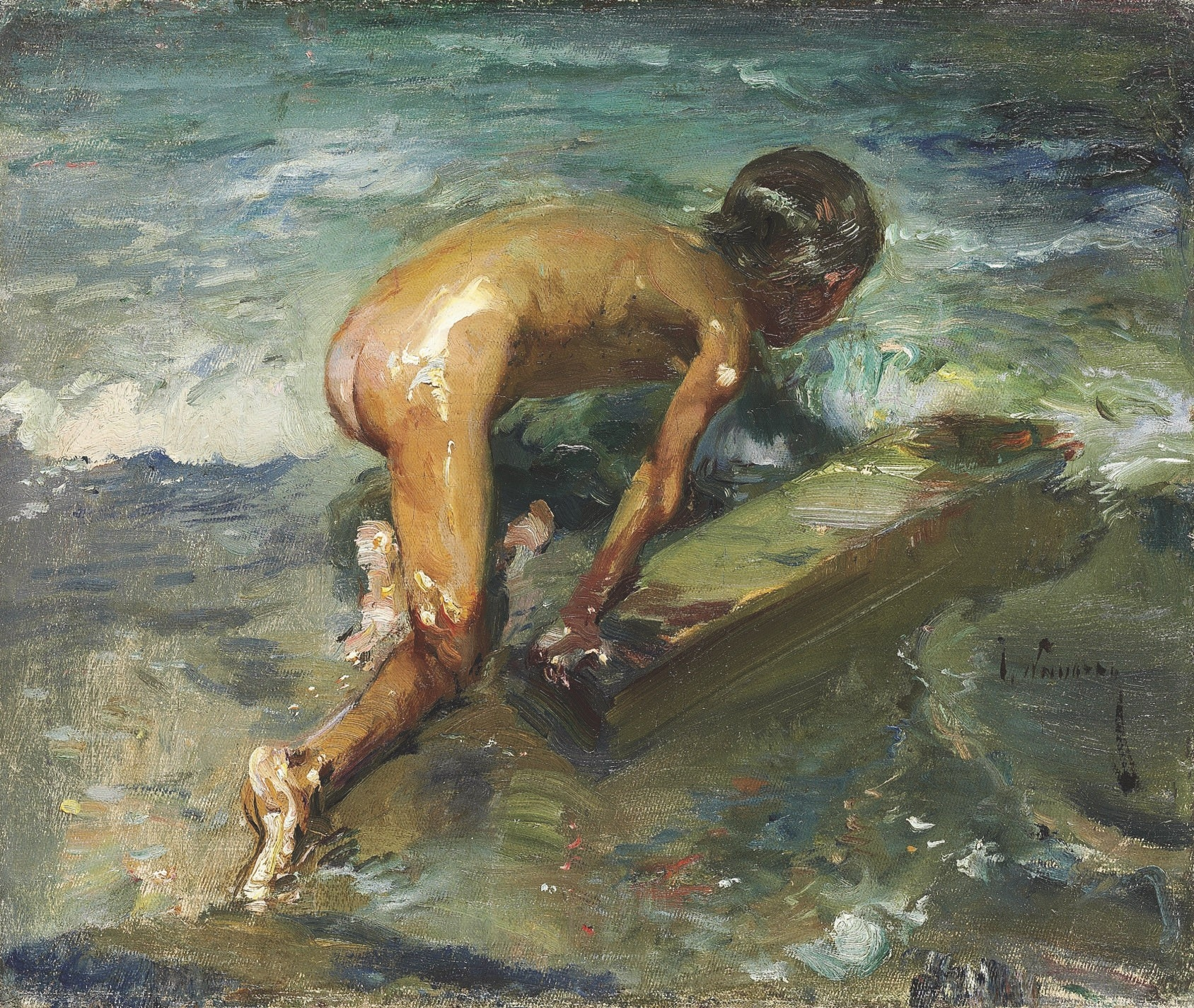
El Niño Bañista, (Boy bathing)

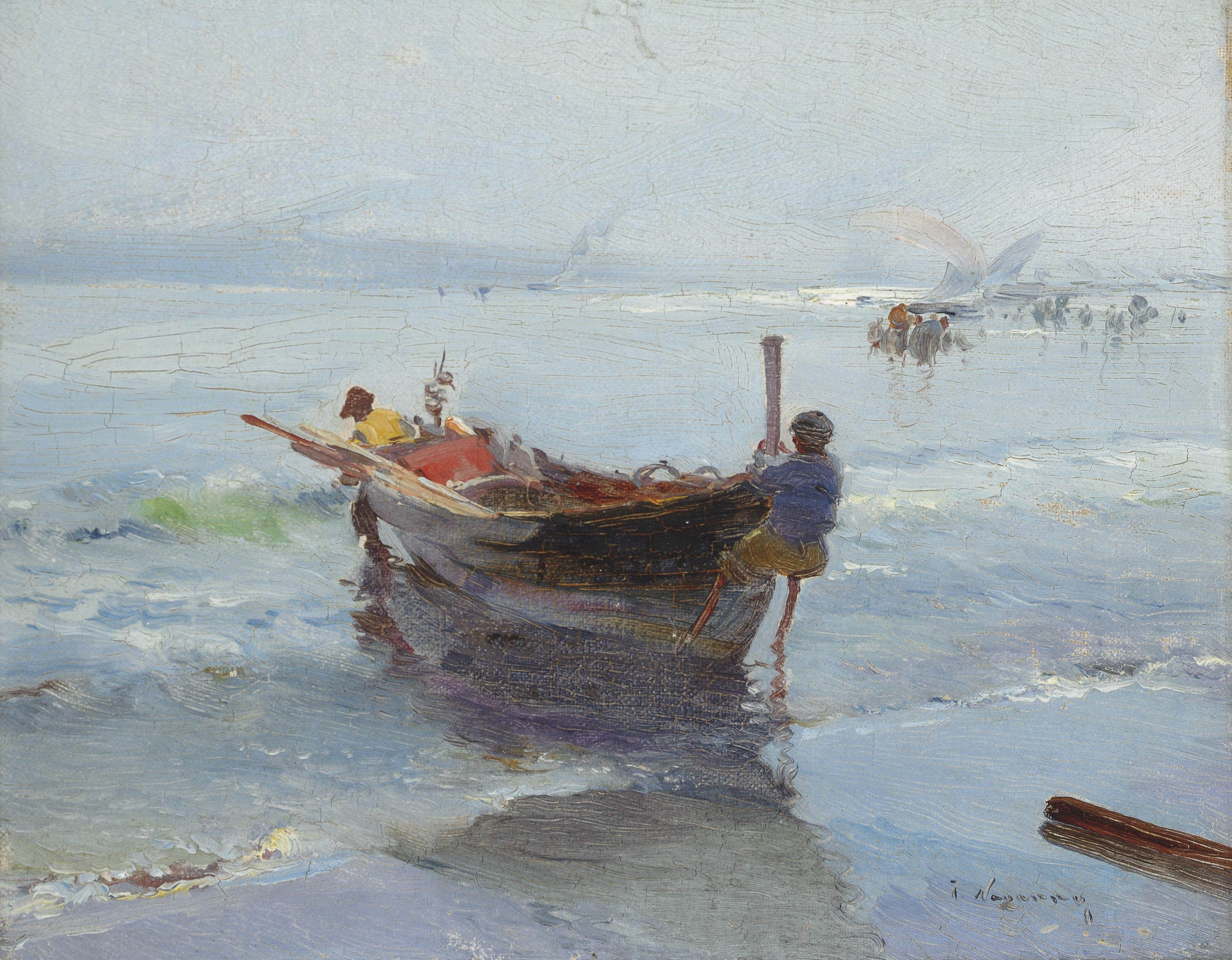
Llegar a la Costa, (Arriving at the Coast)

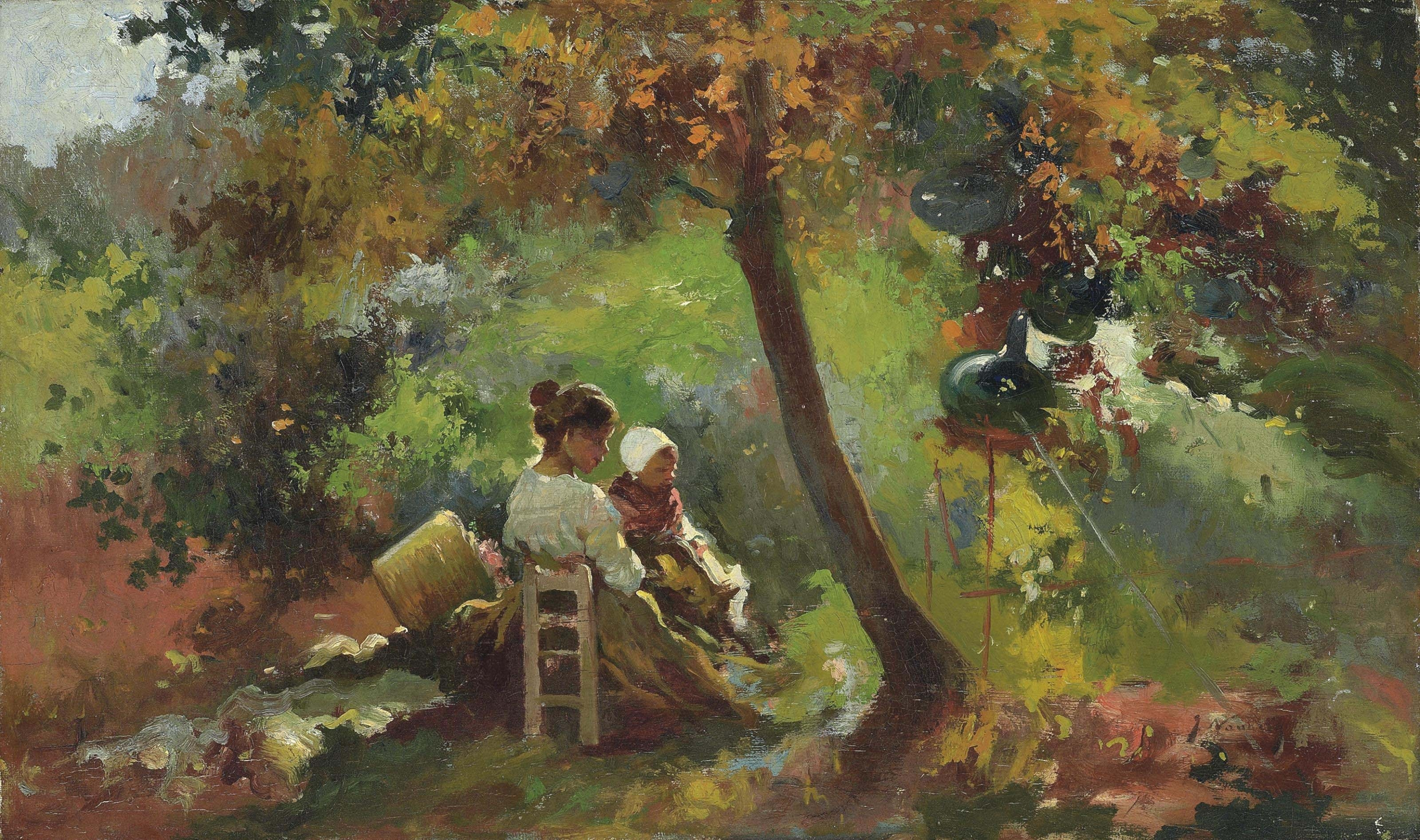
En el Jardín, (In the Garden)

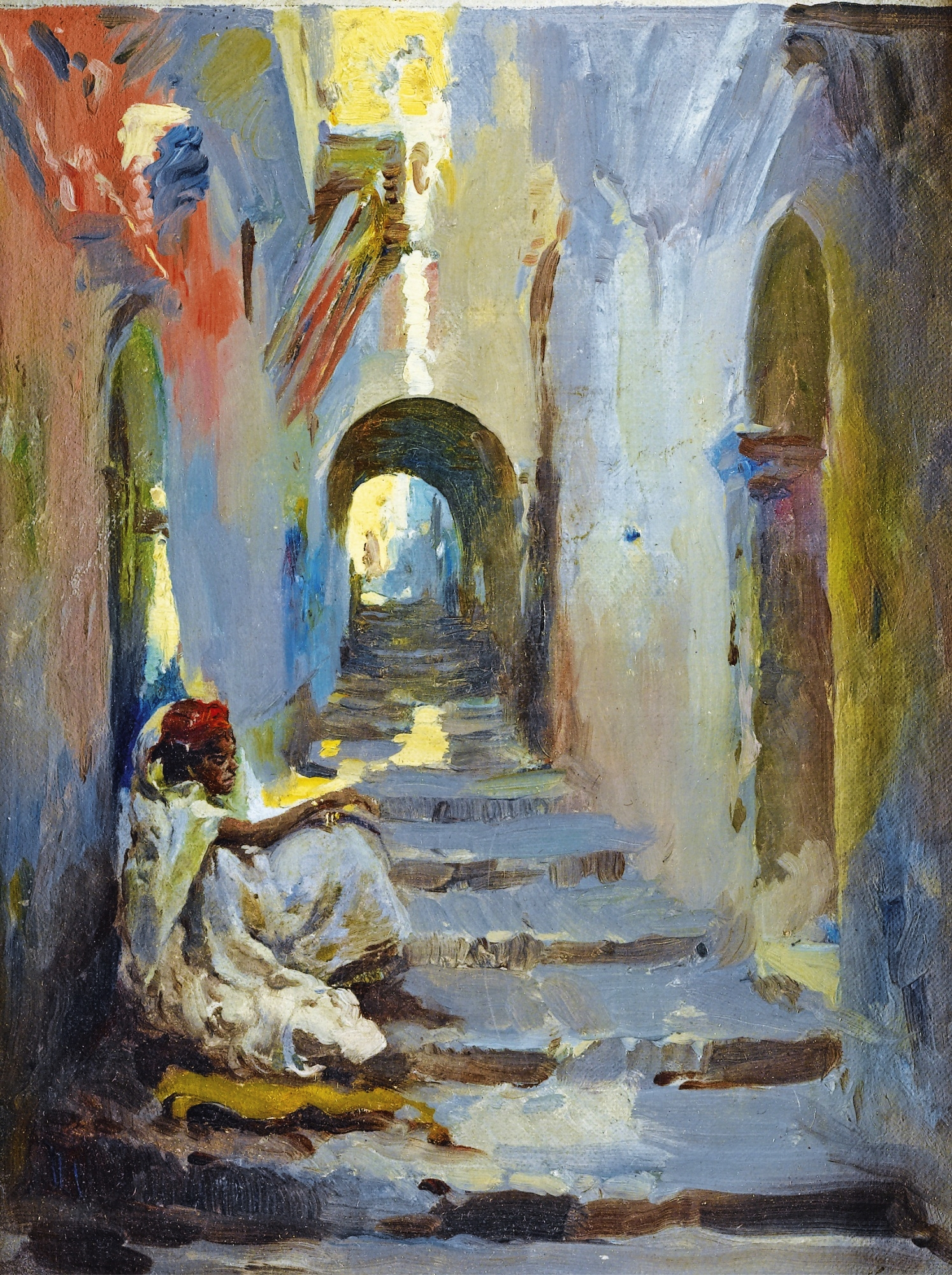
Escalier dans la Medina (Stairs in the Medina)

== See also ==
- List of Orientalist artists
- Orientalism
