= Grau (surname) =

Grau (Catalan: [ˈɡɾaw]; German: [ˈɡʁaʊ]) is a common surname used in Catalan and German, meaning respectively "grade", coming from the Latin word gradus, or "gray". Notable people with the surname include:

- Agustí Grau (1893–1964), Spanish (Catalan) composer
- Albin Grau (1884–1971), German artist, architect and occultist
- Alexander Grau (born 1973), German racing driver
- Benjamin Grau (born 1945), Spanish (Catalan) former motorcycle racer
- Dieter Grau (1913–2014), German rocket scientist
- Doris Grau (1924–1995), American actress, script supervisor and voice actress
- Emili Prats Grau (born 1946) Andorran politician
- Emilio Grau Sala (1911–1975), Spanish (Catalan) artist
- Enrique Grau (1920–2004), Colombian artist
- Eulàlia Grau (born 1946), Spanish (Catalan) artist
- Francisco Grau (1947–2019), Spanish musician
- Fritz Grau (1894–?), German athlete
- Hugo Grau (1899–1984), German biologist
- Jacinto Grau (1877–1958), Spanish playwright
- Jaume Grau (born 1997), Spanish footballer
- Jeff Grau (born 1979), American former football player
- Joan Carretero i Grau (born 1955), Spanish (Catalan) politician
- Jorge Grau (1930–2018), Spanish (Catalan) director, scriptwriter, playwright and painter
- José Sanchis Grau (1932–2011), Spanish comic book writer
- Lester W. Grau (fl. 1992–2011), American military writer
- Lorenzo Batlle y Grau (1810–1887), President of Uruguay from 1868 to 1872
- Martin Grau (born 1992), German steeplechase runner
- Maurice Grau (1849–1907), Austrian-born American impresario
- Miguel Grau Seminario (1834–1879), Peruvian naval officer
- Nicolás Grau (born 1983), Chilean business manager, economist and politician
- Olga Grau (born 1945), Chilean writer, professor, philosopher
- Oliver Grau (born 1965), German art historian
- Polita Grau (1915–2000), former First Lady of Cuba
- Ramón Grau (1881–1969), President of Cuba 1933–34 and 1944–48
- Raúl Cubas Grau (born 1943), President of Paraguay, 1998–1999
- Roberto Grau (1900–1944), Argentine chess player
- Roberto Diego Grau (born 1970), Argentine rugby player
- Santiago Grau (born 1963), Spanish (Catalan) field hockey player
- Shirley Ann Grau (1929–2020), American writer
- Vicente Grau Juan (born 1968), Spanish athlete
