= Laranjeiras River (Santa Catarina) =

- Mouth location in Brazil
- Native name: Rio Laranjeiras (Portuguese)

Location
- Country: Brazil

Physical characteristics
- Source
  - location: Santa Catarina state
- Mouth
  - coordinates: 28°18′51″S 49°21′54″W

Basin features
- River system: Hipólito River

The Laranjeiras River (Portuguese: Rio Laranjeiras) is a river of Santa Catarina state in southeastern Brazil. It is a left tributary of the Hipólito River, which in turn is a right tributary of the Braço do Norte River.

The river rises in the São Joaquim National Park. The upper reaches of the Laranjeiras River are fed by streams from the 1,330-hectare (3,300-acre) Serra Furada State Park, created in 1980.

== See also ==
- List of rivers of Santa Catarina
