= BAP Almirante Grau =

The flagship of the Peruvian Navy has traditionally borne the name BAP Almirante Grau, in honor of the Peruvian Admiral Miguel Grau Seminario.

- The first BAP Almirante Grau (1906) was an Almirante Grau-class scout cruiser built in the United Kingdom; it was commissioned in 1907 and decommissioned in 1958
- The second BAP Almirante Grau (CL-81) was the former HMS Newfoundland, a Crown Colony-class light cruiser built in the United Kingdom; it was commissioned by the Peruvian Navy in 1960 and decommissioned in 1982; its name was changed to BAP Capitán Quiñones (CL-83) in 1973
- The third BAP Almirante Grau (CLM-81) was the former HNLMS De Ruyter, a De Ruyter-class light cruiser built in the Netherlands; it was commissioned by the Peruvian Navy in 1973 and decommissioned in 2017; its name was temporarily changed to Proyecto de Modernización 01 (Modernization Project 01) or PM-01 from 1985 through 1988 while it underwent modernization in Amsterdam
- The fourth BAP Almirante Grau (CH-81) was the former HNLMS De Zeven Provinciën, a De Ruyter-class light cruiser built in the Netherlands; it was commissioned by the Peruvian Navy in 1978 as BAP Aguirre (CH-84) and decommissioned in 1999; its name was temporarily changed to BAP Almirante Grau from 1985 through 1988 while BAP Almirante Grau (CLM-81) underwent modernization in Amsterdam
- The fifth BAP Almirante Grau (FM-53) was formerly the frigate BAP Montero, built in 1984 and renamed when designated fleet flagship in September 2017.
