= Josep Navarro Santaeulàlia =

Catalan writer and poet

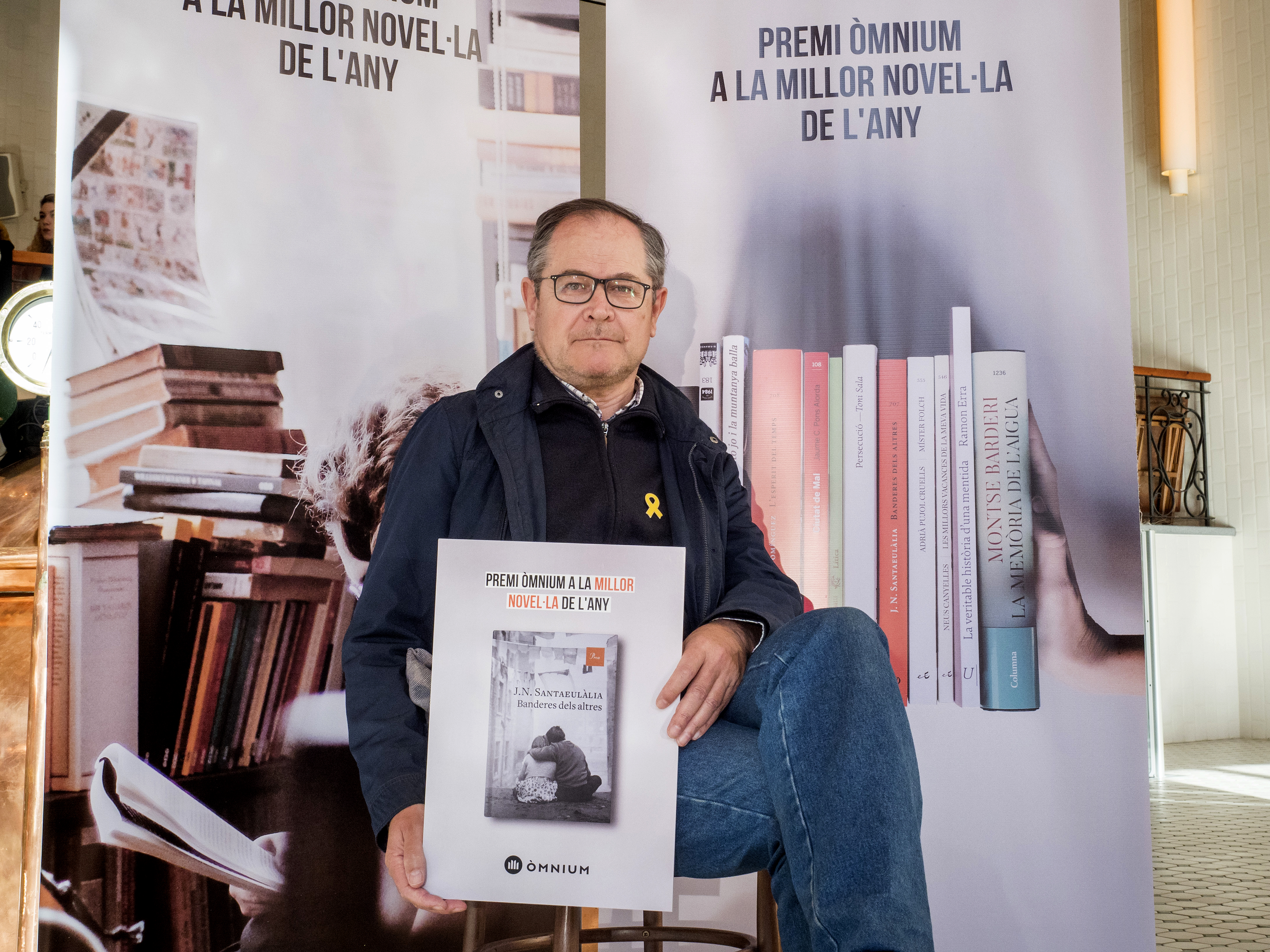
Els 12 finalistes del Premi Òmnium Millor Novel·la de l'Any 191130 199 dc

J. N. Santaeulàlia, Josep Navarro Santaeulàlia (Banyoles, Girona; 1955) is a Catalan writer and poet.

== Biography ==
Josep Navarro Santaeulàlia, whose name is always stated as J. N. Santaeulàlia on his books, was born in 1955 in Banyoles, Girona, where he still lives with his family. He is a poet, essayist, novelist and translator. His first publication was a poetry book, Memòries de la carn (Memories of the flesh). The author has been awarded with the Prize for Essays Crítica Serra d'Or 1991, with the Novel Award Crítica Serra d'Or 2000 and the Premi Columna 2002, also for a novel, among others.

== Publications ==
- Memòria de la carn, poetry, Columna, Barcelona 1987
- Questió de mots: del simbolisme a la poesia pura, essay, La Magrana, Barcelona 1989
- Objectes perduts, stories, La Magrana, Barcelona 1990
- La llum dins l'aigua, poetry, Columna, Barcelona 1996
- Una ombra a l'herba, poetry, Moll, Majorca 1998
- Fusions, poetry, La Magrana, Barcelona 1997
- Terra negra, novel, Proa, Barcelona 1996
- Bulbs, novel, La Magrana, Barcelona 1999
- L'absent, novel, La Magrana, Barcelona 1999
- Pagodes i gratacels, travel narrative, Columna, Barcelona 2001
- Ulls d'aigua, novel, Columna, Barcelona 2002
- Punt mort, novel, Columna, Barcelona 2005
- Yume, novel, La Magrana, Barcelona 2007
- La sorra vermella, novel, Proa, Barcelona, 2017

== Translations by the author ==
- Marea baixa. Haikus de primavera i d'estiu, Haikus (from Japanese to Catalan), La Magrana, Barcelona 1997
- Marea Baixa, Haikus de les quatre estacions, Haikus (from Japanese to Catalan), www.amazon.es, 2015
