= Estadio Miguel Grau =

There are two stadiums in Peru named Estadio Miguel Grau.

- Estadio Miguel Grau (Piura) in Piura
- Estadio Miguel Grau (Callao) in Callao
