= Miguel Grau Avenue (Piura) =

Route information
- Length: 4.7 mi (7.6 km)

Major junctions
- East end: Tacna Jiron, Historic Center
- Loreto Avenue; Sullana Avenue; San Martín Avenue; Guillermo Gullman Avenue; Vice Avenue; César Vallejo Avenue; Marcavelica Avenue; Raúl Mata La Cruz Avenue; A Avenue
- West end: North Pan-American Highway, City of the Sun Urban Center

Location
- Country: Peru

Highway system
- Highways in Peru

Miguel Grau Avenue, known locally as Grau Avenue, is one of the main avenues in the city of Piura, in Peru. It extends from east to west through the historic center and a large part of the city.

Its first blocks stand out for being an important commercial hub.

== Route ==
From east to west, it begins at the intersection with Tacna Jiron, in the historic center of Piura, and ends when it is intercepted by the North Pan-American Highway in the direction of the Piura bypass road.

== See also ==
- Piura
