= Orleans, Santa Catarina =

Municipality of Santa Catarina state, Brazil

Coordinates: 28°21′S 49°18′W

- Municipality
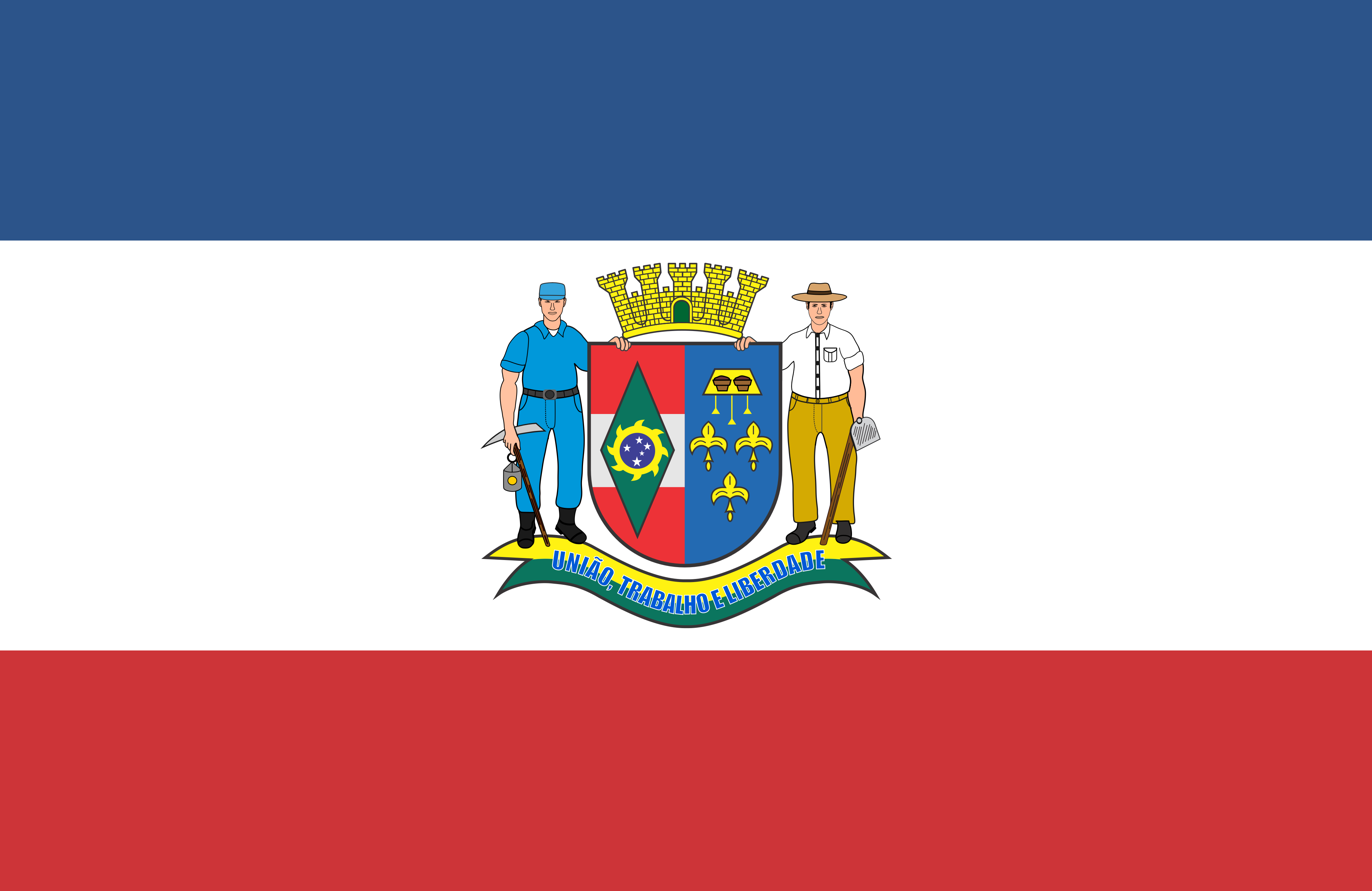
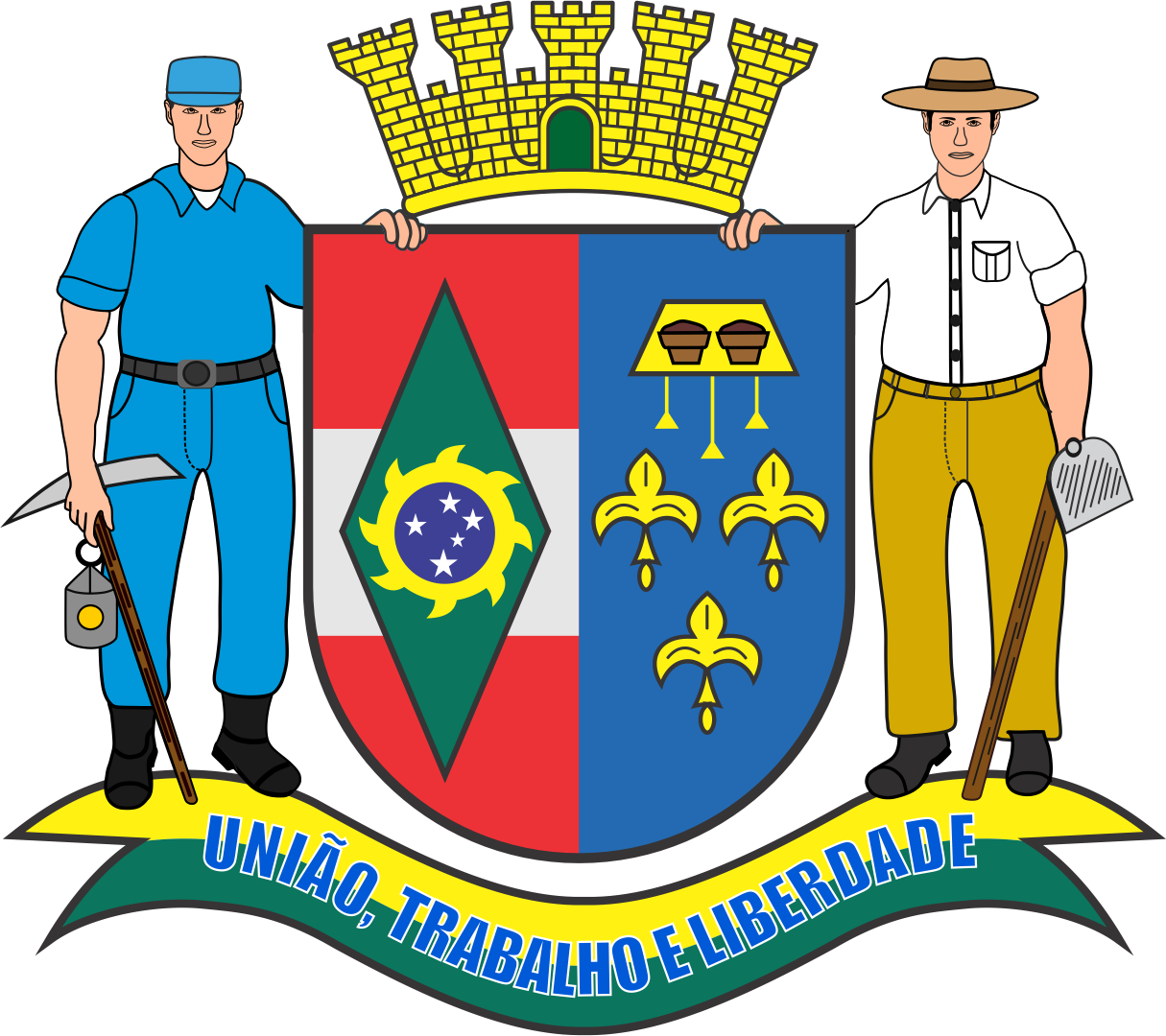
- Flag Coat of arms
- Interactive map of Orleans, Santa Catarina
- Country: Brazil
- Time zone: UTC−3 (BRT)

Orleans highlighted in Santa Catarina.

Orleans is a Brazilian municipality in the state of Santa Catarina. The town is located in the south of the state. As of 2020, the estimated population was 23,038.

The municipality contains part of the 1,330-hectare (3,300-acre) Serra Furada State Park, created in 1980.

== History ==
Named after emperor Dom Pedro II's son-in-law, Gaston, Count of Eu, from the House of Orléans on December 26, 1884. It was first colonized by Italians, then Germans, Austrians, Poles, Norwegians, Latvians, Dutch and other nationalities from Europe.

== Climate ==
Climate data for Orleans (1976–2005)
Month	Jan	Feb	Mar	Apr	May	Jun	Jul	Aug	Sep	Oct	Nov	Dec	Year
Record high °C (°F)	44.6 (112.3)	41.0 (105.8)	43.2 (109.8)	41.1 (106.0)	36.3 (97.3)	35.0 (95.0)	35.0 (95.0)	38.2 (100.8)	38.4 (101.1)	39.8 (103.6)	39.7 (103.5)	41.5 (106.7)	44.6 (112.3)
Mean daily maximum °C (°F)	31.2 (88.2)	30.5 (86.9)	29.3 (84.7)	26.1 (79.0)	24.1 (75.4)	22.3 (72.1)	22.3 (72.1)	23.3 (73.9)	24.5 (76.1)	24.0 (75.2)	28.4 (83.1)	30.2 (86.4)	26.4 (79.4)
Daily mean °C (°F)	23.0 (73.4)	23.1 (73.6)	21.6 (70.9)	19.0 (66.2)	16.1 (61.0)	14.4 (57.9)	14.2 (57.6)	14.9 (58.8)	16.5 (61.7)	18.9 (66.0)	20.5 (68.9)	22.4 (72.3)	18.7 (65.7)
Mean daily minimum °C (°F)	16.5 (61.7)	16.9 (62.4)	16.1 (61.0)	13.0 (55.4)	10.3 (50.5)	8.5 (47.3)	7.8 (46.0)	9.0 (48.2)	10.6 (51.1)	12.7 (54.9)	14.2 (57.6)	15.7 (60.3)	12.6 (54.7)
Record low °C (°F)	7.1 (44.8)	7.4 (45.3)	6.0 (42.8)	2.0 (35.6)	−1.8 (28.8)	−3.2 (26.2)	−5.4 (22.3)	−5.8 (21.6)	−2.1 (28.2)	3.0 (37.4)	2.6 (36.7)	6.4 (43.5)	−5.8 (21.6)
Average precipitation mm (inches)	219.8 (8.65)	186.7 (7.35)	134.4 (5.29)	83.8 (3.30)	106.9 (4.21)	77.6 (3.06)	121.3 (4.78)	84.4 (3.32)	109.0 (4.29)	137.6 (5.42)	121.8 (4.80)	151.4 (5.96)	1,534.7 (60.43)
Average relative humidity (%)	83	85	86	85	85	87	85	85	85	84	83	84	85
Source: Empresa Brasileira de Pesquisa Agropecuária (EMBRAPA)
