= Peruvian Naval School =

Coordinates: 12.0714°S 77.1647°W

Naval Academy of Peru
- Type: Naval School
- Established: 1657
- Affiliations: Peruvian Navy
- Director: Rear Admiral Luis José Polar Figari
- Location: La Punta, Callao, Peru
- Website: Escuela Naval del Perú

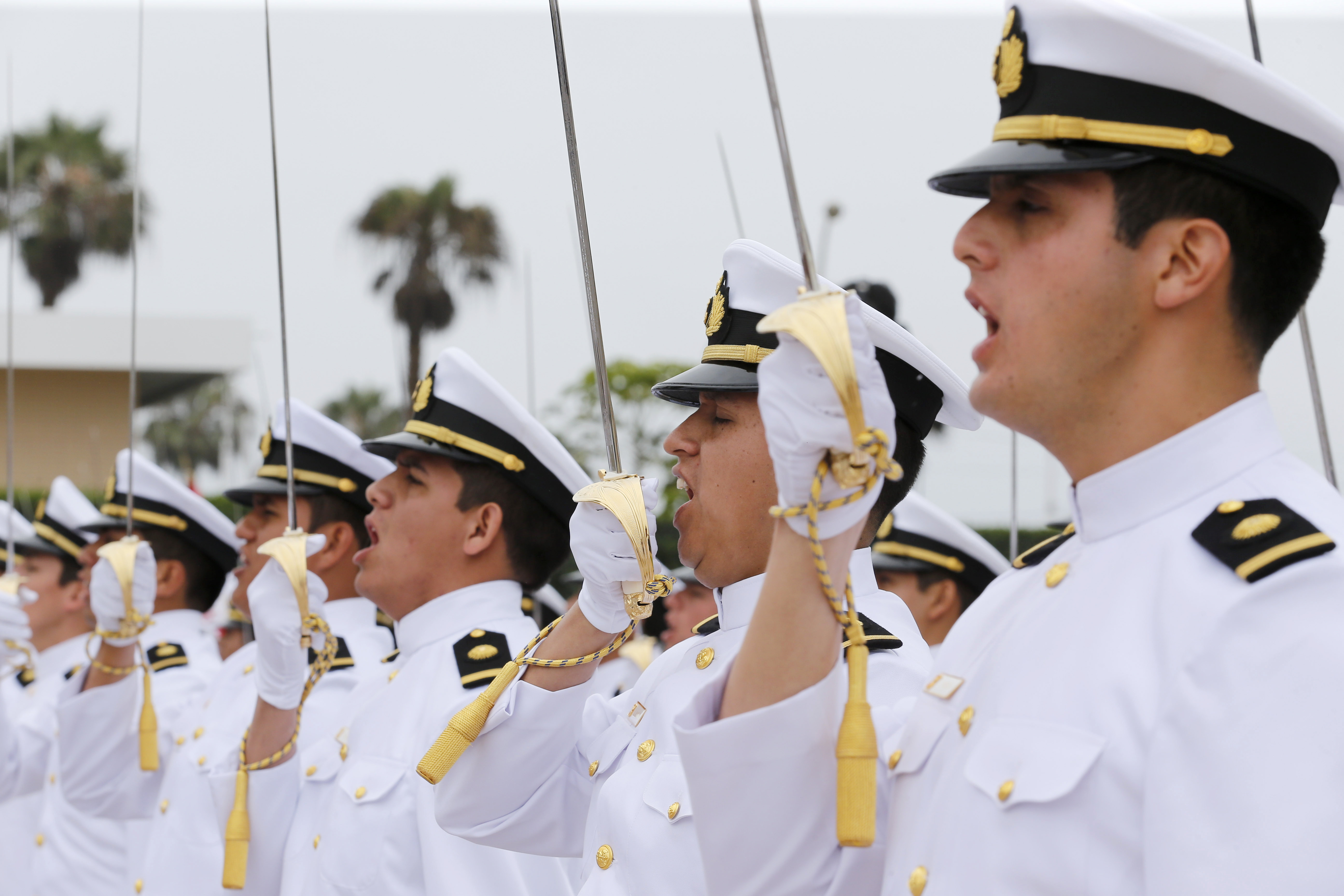
Cadets graduate the Naval Academy, 11 December 2015

The Naval Academy of Peru (Spanish: Escuela Naval del Perú) is the institution in charge of the undergraduate education of officers of the Peruvian Navy. It is located at La Punta, Callao, overlooking the Pacific Ocean. Its current director is Rear Admiral Luis José Polar Figari.

== Admission ==
To be admitted, candidates must be Peruvian, between sixteen and twenty years of age upon entrance, unmarried with no children, physically and mentally in good health, height over 1.60 m (females) or over 1.65 m (males), with a complete secondary education and of no political affiliation. The admission procedure includes academic, knowledge, medical, physical and psychological exams as well as a personal interview of the candidate by a board of Admirals and high-ranking officers headed by the Director of the Academy.

== Campus ==
The following are the main buildings of the Escuela Naval:

- Edificio Grau: provides housing for the cadets.
- Edificio Guise: library, media center, conference room, classrooms and laboratories.
- Edificio Ferré: Director's office and several administrative offices.
- Edificio Aguirre: officers' berths and mess.
- Edificio Unanue: non-commissioned officers (enlisted) berths.
- Gimnasio Pardon: gym with facilities for the practice of sports such as basketball, fencing, martial arts, swimming and volleyball.
- Casa de Botes Scarletich: storage for rowing, sailing and scuba diving equipment.
- Auditórium De Izcue y Runciman: available for the presentation of films, plays and other presentations.

== History ==
The Escuela Naval del Perú has its precedents in the Escuela Náutica (Nautical School) established at Lima by Viceroy Luis Enríquez de Guzmán, Count of Alba de Liste in 1657. This institution closed in 1709 and was superseded by the Academia Real Náutica de Lima (Royal Nautical Academy of Lima) which opened its doors in 1794 under the sponsorship of Viceroy Francisco Gil de Taboada y Lemos. The Academy was closed by the War of Independence in July, 1821 but it was reopened in November 1821 as Escuela Central de Marina (Central Naval School). During the 19th century the School changed locations several times until its closure at the outbreak of the War of the Pacific (1879–1883). Labors resumed in 1888 as Escuela Naval but a permanent location was not obtained until 1915 when the construction of the current campus at La Punta ended. In 1921 the school received its actual name "Escuela Naval del Perú" Installations were destroyed by an earthquake in 1974, the rebuilding process lasted up to 1981. Admission for women at the school has been allowed since 1998.

== The Battalion of the Corps of Cadets "Battle of Angamos" ==
The cadets of the Naval school are organized into the "Battle of Angamos" Cadet Battalion, divided into 4 companies and the Casma Cadet Band.

- 1st Company "Abtao"
- 2nd Company "May 2nd"
- 3rd Company "Pacocha"
- 4th Company "Iquique"
- Casma Cadet Band

== See also ==
- Callao Naval Base
- Port of Callao
