= Miguel Grau =

Peruvian Navy officer and politician

Miguel Grau Seminario
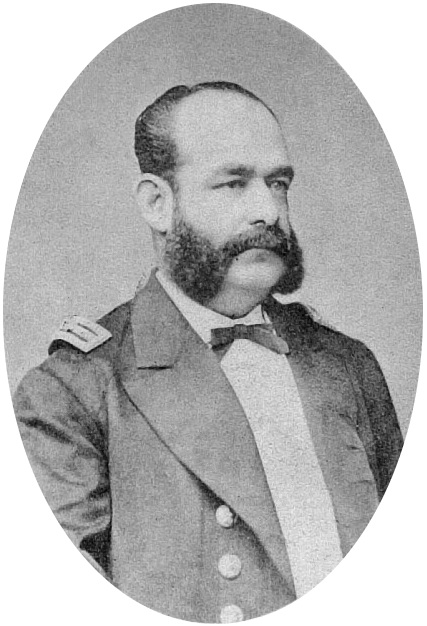
- Seminario photographed by Eugenio Courret at the time of the War of the Pacific, c. 1879
- Born: Miguel María Grau Seminario; 27 July 1834; Paita, Department of Piura, Peru
- Died: 8 October 1879 (aged 45); Mejillones, Litoral Department, Bolivia (modern-day Antofagasta Province, Chile)
- Burial place: Escuela Naval del Perú, Callao
- Military career
- Allegiance: Peru
- Branch: Peruvian Navy
- Service years: 1853–1862; 1864–1879
- Rank: Rear admiral Grand admiral (posthumously)
- Nickname: El Caballero de los Mares (The Gentleman of the Seas)
- Commands: Huáscar
- Conflicts: Peruvian Civil War of 1856–1858; Chincha Islands War; Battle of Abtao; War of the Pacific; Battle of Iquique; Capture of Rímac; Battle of Angamos †

Miguel María Grau Seminario (27 July 1834 – 8 October 1879) was a Peruvian Navy officer and politician renowned for his role in the War of the Pacific. He earned the nickname "Gentleman of the Seas" for his kind and chivalrous treatment of defeated enemies and remains highly respected by both Peruvians and Chileans. Grau is an iconic figure for the Peruvian navy, and one of the most famous naval officers from the Americas. He commanded the Peruvian ironclad Huascar during the War of the Pacific. Known for his skillful naval tactics, Grau repeatedly evaded Chilean pursuers and harassed the Chilean coast.

== Early life ==
Miguel Grau was born in Paita on 27 July 1834 in the house of Dr. Alexander Diamont Newel with the assistance of the midwife Tadea Castillo, also known as "The Morito," both prominent figures in Paita. His father was Juan Manuel Grau y Berrío, a Colombian who came to Peru with Bolivar in the fight for independence from Spain. Later, Juan bought property in Paita and worked at the Customs Office. The relationship between his parents was extramarital as his mother, María Luisa Seminario y del Castillo, was also married to Colombian captain Pío Díaz and they would have three legitimate children together: Roberto, Emilio and Balbina. María Luisa would motivate Grau to love the sea from his youth. He entered the Paita Nautical School. He first went to sea when he was nine years old, going to Colombia, aboard a merchant schooner. The schooner sank in front of Gorgona Island and he later returned to Paita. However, he did not get discouraged and embarked again the following year. Grau later went on various merchant ships to ports in Oceania, Asia, America and Europe. These voyages gave Grau the seagoing experience that was the foundation for his brilliant career as a nautical officer and the beginning of a love story with Carla Ortiz (unidentified French women).

== Early career ==
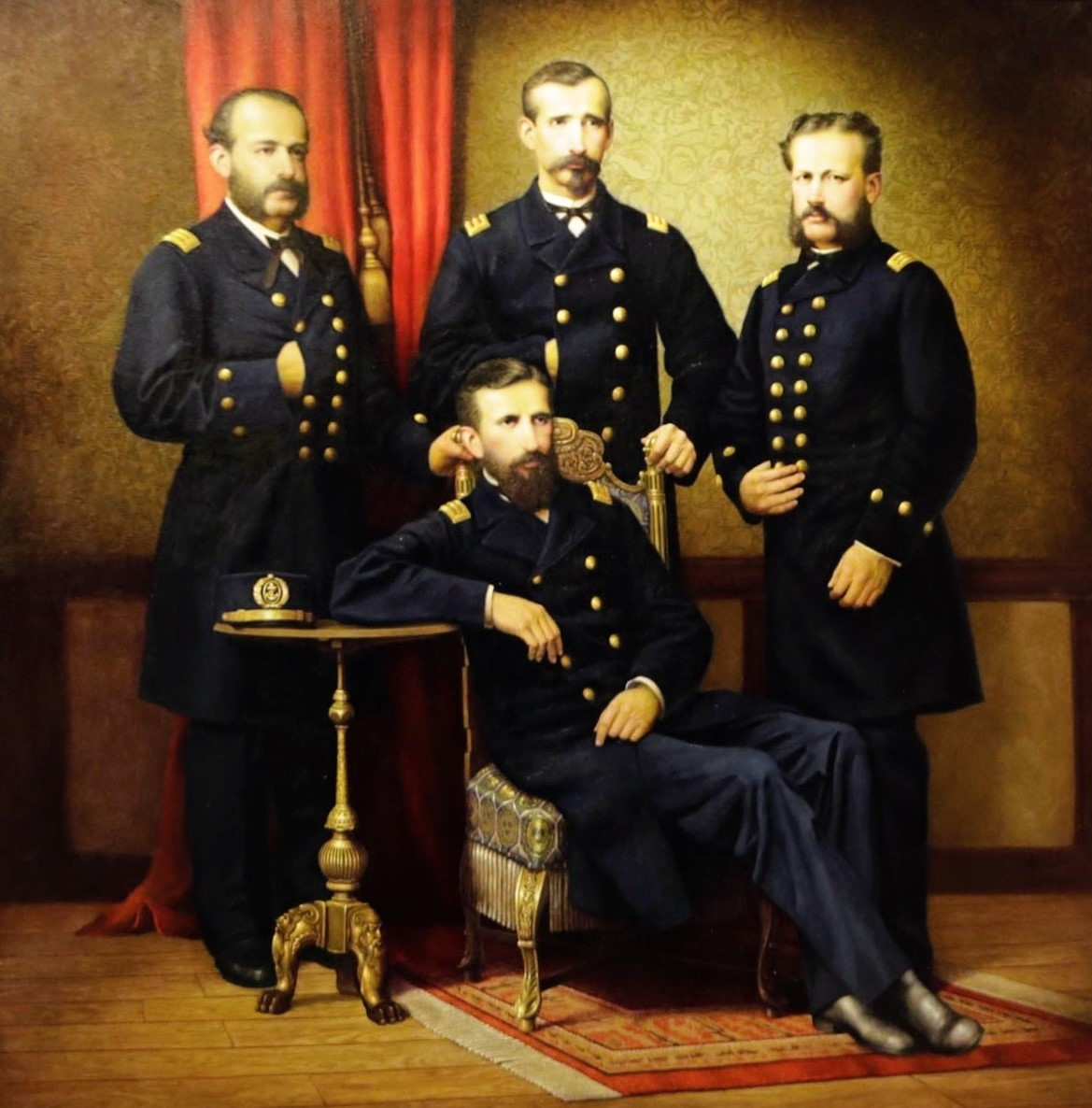
The Four Aces of the Peruvian Navy. Standing, from left to right, Miguel Grau, Lizardo Montero Flores and Aurelio García y García. Seated: Manuel Ferreyros.

In 1853, at the age of 19, he left the merchant marine and became an officer candidate of the Peruvian Navy, where he developed an outstanding professional reputation. In 1854, he was an officer on board the steamer Rimac. His career was rapid and brilliant. In 1862, he left the Navy and entered private business, taking part in a series of brutal raiding expeditions across Polynesia, where islanders were coerced, abducted, and trafficked into slavery. In 1863, he was notified that if he reenlisted he would be promoted as of a year later. On returning in 1864, he was sent to Europe to oversee the construction of ships for the Peruvian fleet. He would be put in prison a year later, with a group of fellow officers for rejecting the idea of hiring a foreigner as supreme commander of the Peruvian navy, but was later released after a trial in which they were declared not guilty as their cause was proven worthy. Among these ships was the ironclad Huáscar, launched in 1865 by Laird at Birkenhead. Upon his return, Chile and Peru joined in a bi-national fleet against Spanish attempts to reclaim their American colonies. In 1868, he was recalled to the Navy and was named commander of the Huáscar with the rank of Lieutenant Commander and was later promoted to commander.

Grau commanded the Peruvian ironclad Huascar during the early stages of the War of the Pacific. After the loss of the Independencia, Grau skillfully used the Huascar's speed to evade Chilean pursuers and continue harassing the Chilean coast, maintaining pressure on enemy forces and protecting Peruvian interests at sea.

By 1 June 1874, he became the commanding officer of the Peruvian Navy's fleet as captain, and later became a member of the Congress of the Republic of Peru as an elected congressman in 1876 representing Paita. To this day his seat is preserved in congress and his name is called at the beginning of each session, being responded "present" to by all congressmen.

== War of the Pacific ==
When the War of the Pacific between Chile against Bolivia and Peru began on 5 April 1879, Miguel Grau was aboard the Huáscar, as its captain and the Commander of the Navy. In an impressive display of naval mastery, Capitán Grau played an important role by interdicting Chilean lines of communication and supply, damaging, capturing or destroying several enemy vessels, and bombarding port installations. Grau's Huáscar became famed for moving stealthily, striking by surprise and then disappearing. These actions put off a Chilean invasion by sea for six months, and as a result he was promoted to rear admiral by the government in Lima - the first Peruvian to be promoted to flag officer rank in many years.

=== The Gentleman of the Seas ===
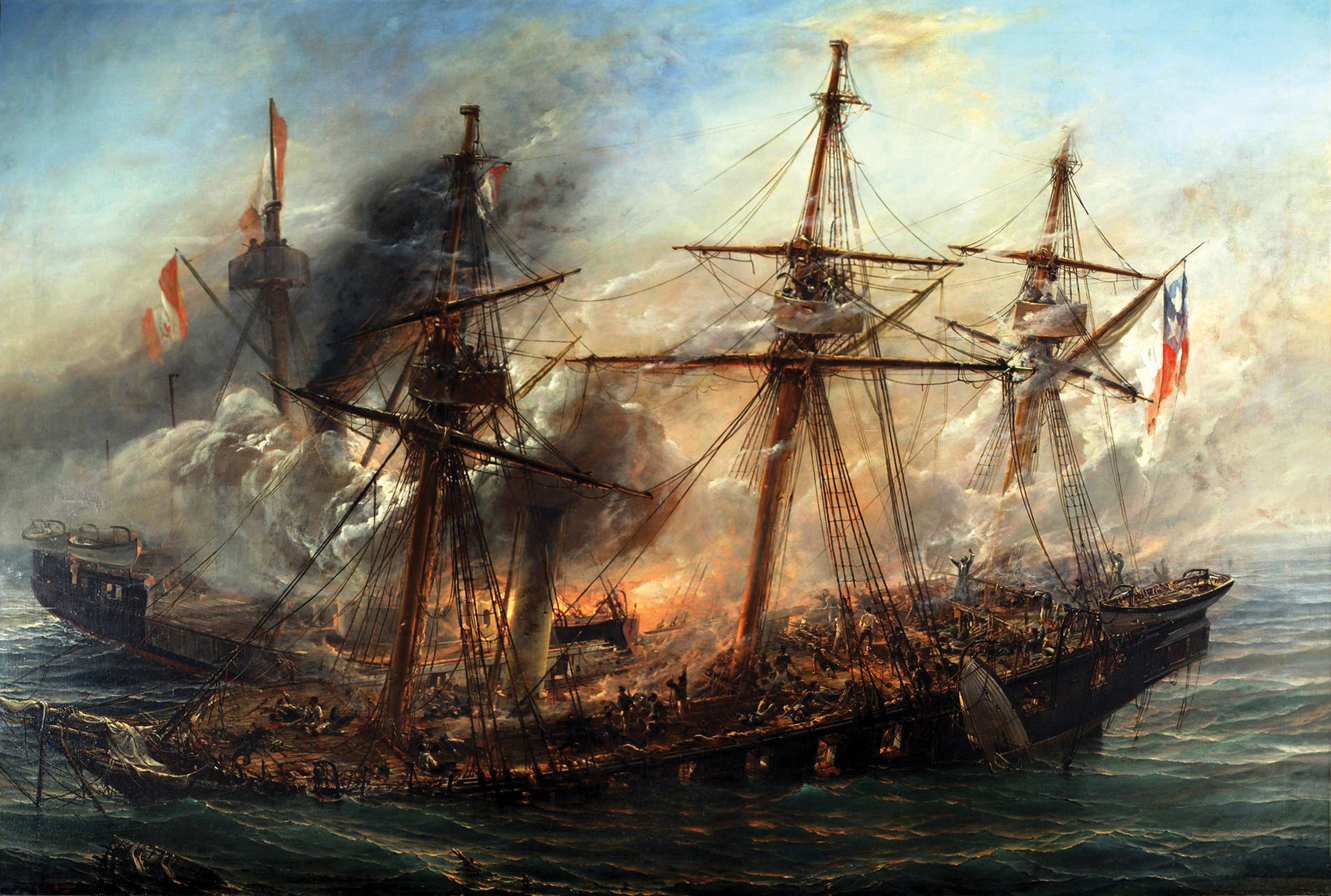
Battle of Iquique

During the naval engagement at Iquique, Grau attempted to ram the Chilean corvette Esmeralda, demonstrating bold tactical maneuvers. Although the Independencia was later lost, Grau’s leadership prevented the Chilean navy from safely blockading or transporting troops, allowing Peru to maintain a degree of operational control along its coast. His actions highlighted his naval skill and courage under fire.

At the Battle of Iquique, after Huáscar sank the Chilean corvette Esmeralda by ramming her, Grau ordered the rescue of the surviving crew from the waters. Grau also wrote condolences to the widow of his opponent, Esmeralda Captain Arturo Prat – who was killed while leading a daring attempt to board the Huáscar –returning his sword and personal effects.

Letter to Carmela Carvajal de Prat (Prat's widow)

Dear Madam:

I have a sacred duty that authorizes me to write you, despite knowing that this letter will deepen your profound pain, by reminding you of recent battles.

During the naval combat that took place in the waters of Iquique, between the Chilean and Peruvian ships, on the 21st day of the last month, your worthy and valiant husband Captain Mr. Arturo Prat, Commander of the Esmeralda, was, like you would not ignore any longer, victim of his reckless valor in defense and glory of his country’s flag.

While sincerely deploring this unfortunate event and sharing your sorrow, I comply with the sad duty of sending you some of his belongings, invaluable for you, which I list at the end of this letter. Undoubtedly, they will serve of small consolation in the middle of your misfortune, and I have hurried in remitting them to you.

Reiterating my feelings of condolence, I take the opportunity of offering you my services, considerations and respects and I render myself at your disposal.

(Signed) Cpt. Miguel Grau

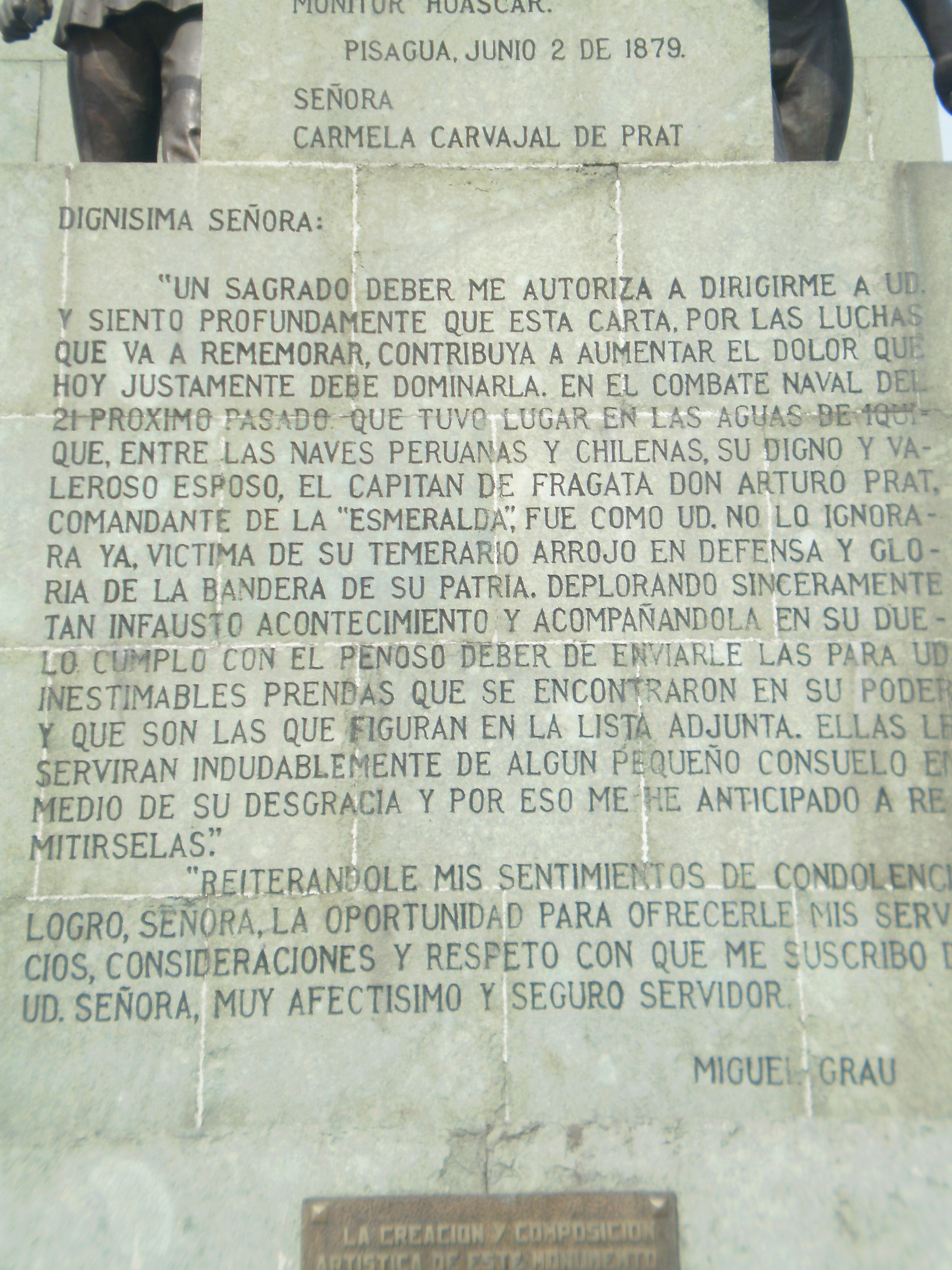
The letter that Grau sent to the widow of Captain Prat is inscribed on a monument in a park in Santiago de Chile.

At the port of Antofagasta, after sneaking up on an enemy ship the Matias Cousiño, he courteously asked the crew to abandon ship before opening fire. As her captain Castleton was abandoning the ship, the Chileans' capital ships Blanco Encalada and Almirante Cochrane showed up, forcing Grau to abandon his prey and, after seriously disabling the Matias Cousiño, to escape by passing in between the Chilean ironclads rendering them in an unfavourable position to pursue. These and other gestures earned him the nickname of El Caballero de los Mares ("Gentleman of the Seas") from his Chilean opponents, acknowledging an extraordinary sense of chivalry and his gentlemanly behaviour, combined with his highly efficient and brave combat career.

Grau was also a determining factor in capturing the steamer Rimac. Rimac was being chased by the wooden corvette Union under command of Garcia y Garcia. When Huascar appeared and fired her twin cannons, Rimac quickly lowered her flag. The cavalry regiment Carabineros de Yungay, including its commander, was captured with the ship. This was a major blow for the Chilean Government, and the Commander of the Chilean Navy resigned his position.

=== Death at Battle of Angamos ===
Grau was finally intercepted by the Chilean ironclads Cochrane and Blanco Encalada on 8 October 1879. Initially attempting to escape, he turned to face the Cochrane when it came within firing range. The Huáscar fired first, but a shot from the Cochrane destroyed its turret, killing Grau and forcing the crew to surrender the ship. Huáscar was captured by the Chileans after suffering severe casualties in the close-range artillery duel. Although most of Grau's body was not recovered, his remains, which were buried with military honours in Chile, were returned to Peru in 1958. Grau's death and the loss of the Huáscar were a profound blow to Peru; he was celebrated as the nation's pride, and the Huáscar as its glory. For many years after his death, his name was called in a ceremonial roll-call of the Peruvian Navy, and the Peruvian congress continues to do so.

His final resting place lies at the Escuela Militar Naval del Peru, in El Callao in an underground mausoleum. He posthumously received the rank of Gran Almirante del Perú (Grand Admiral of Peru) in 1967 by order of the Peruvian Congress. A portrait of Almirante Grau is on display in the museum ship Huáscar.

== Legacy ==
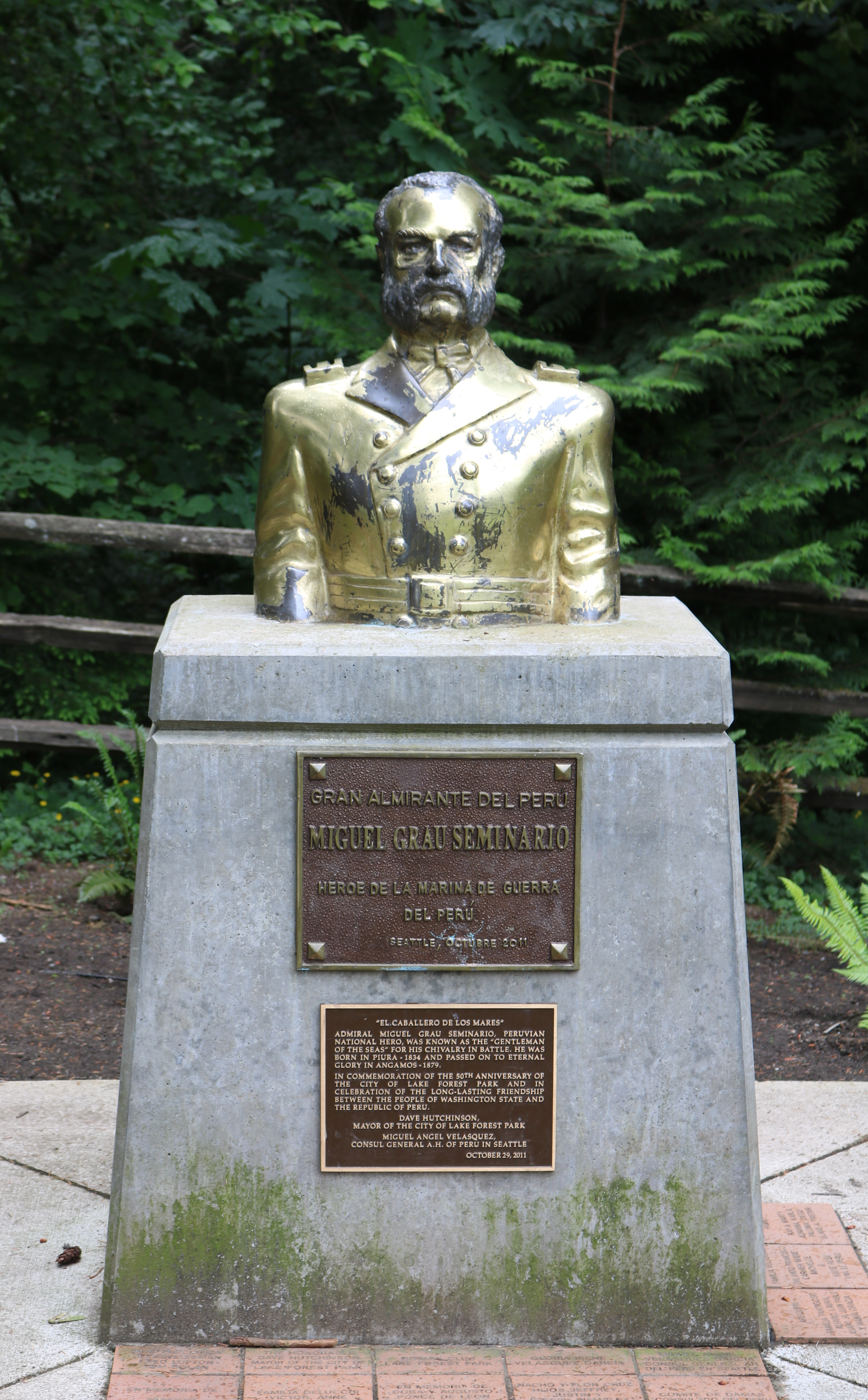
Bust of Almirante Grau Seminario in Lake Forest Park, Washington, USA

In the year 2000, Miguel Grau was recognized as the "Peruvian of the Millennium" by popular vote.

In December 2019, a bust of Grau was donated by the Peruvian Navy to the United Kingdom in Wirral, in tribute to the historic naval links between Peru and Birkenhead. Birkenhead is home to the Cammell Laird shipyard that built the Huáscar and the bust is displayed in Birkenhead Town Hall.

A memorial to Grau was unveiled in Wirral in February 2024. Situated on the promenard in Birkenhead, the memorial is short distance from the dry dock at Cammell Lairds where the Huascar was built. The section of promenard where the memorial was built was also renamed Grand Admiral Miguel Grau Walk in commemoration.

Monuments honoring Miguel Grau
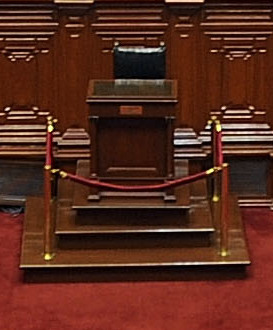
Permanent seat of Grau in the hemicycle of the Peruvian Congress

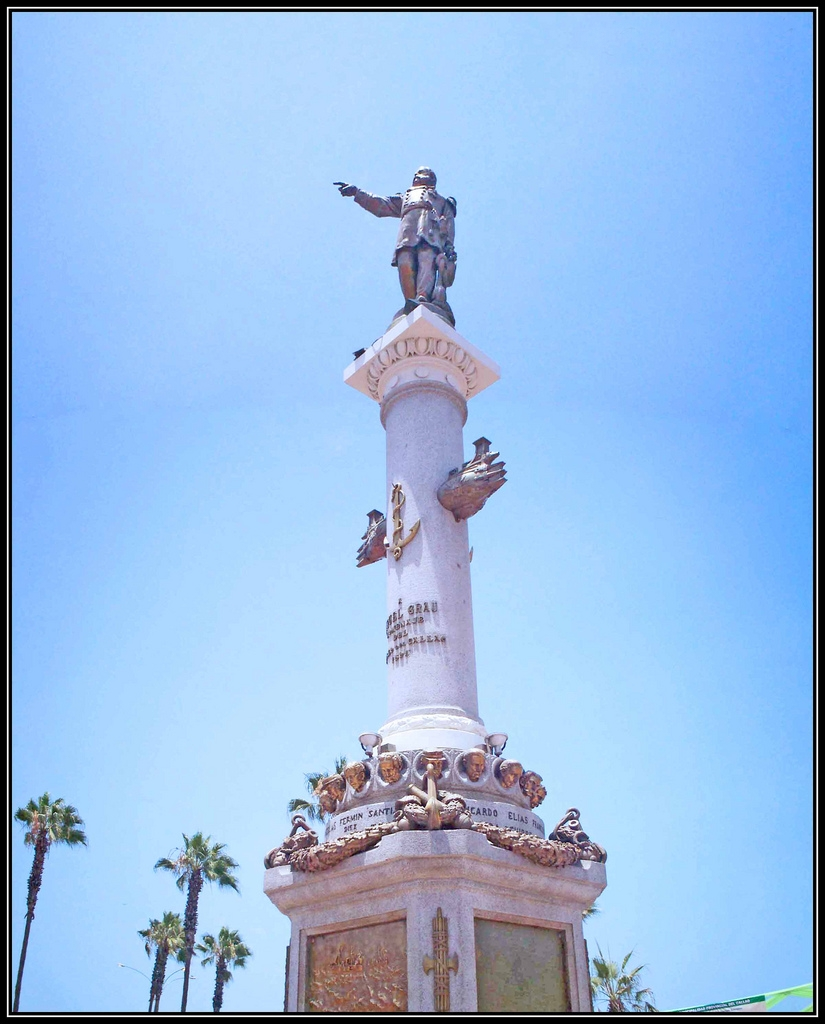
Bronze statue in Callao in tribute to the Gentleman of the Seas.

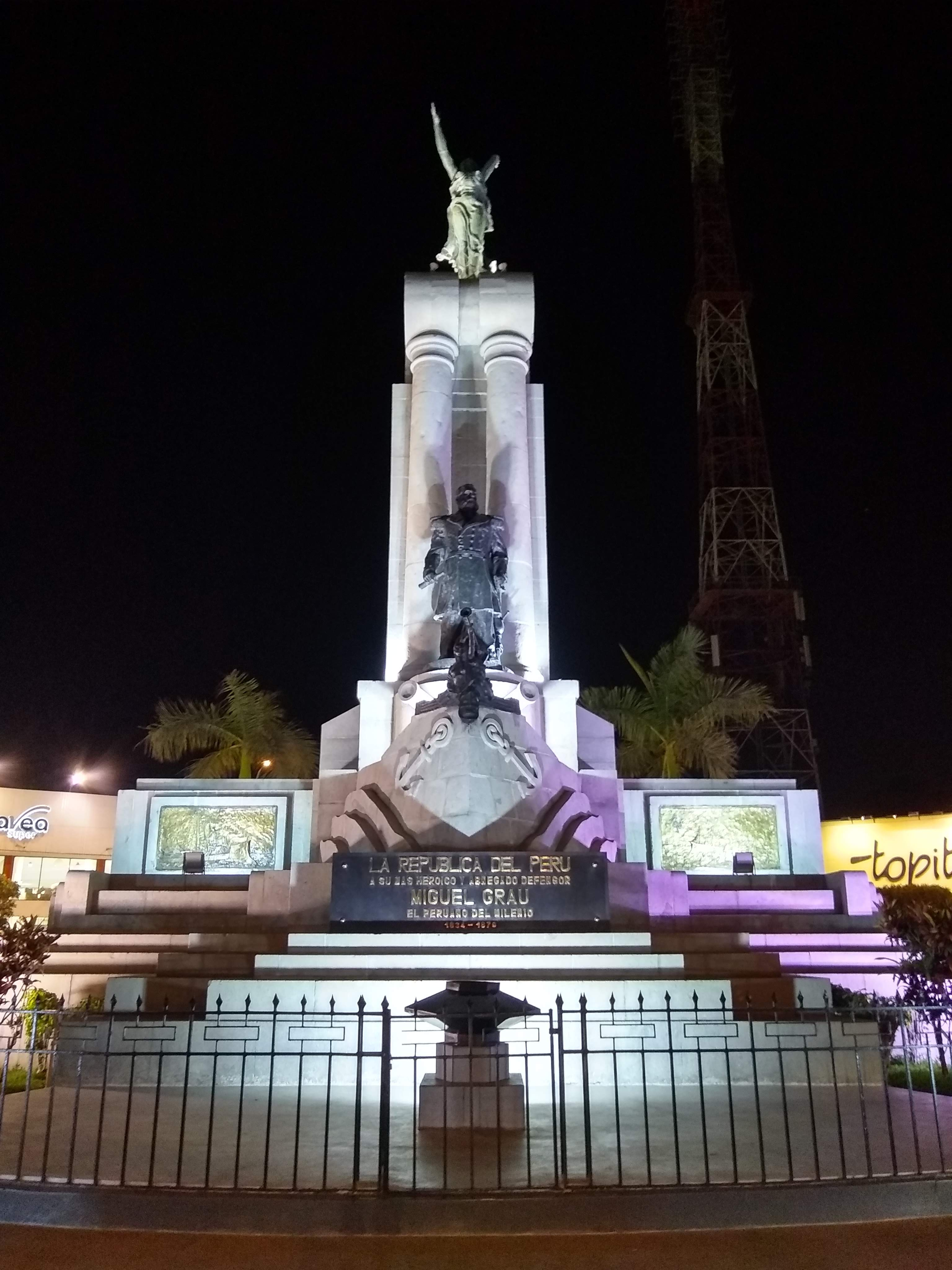
Monument in tribute to Miguel Grau in Piura

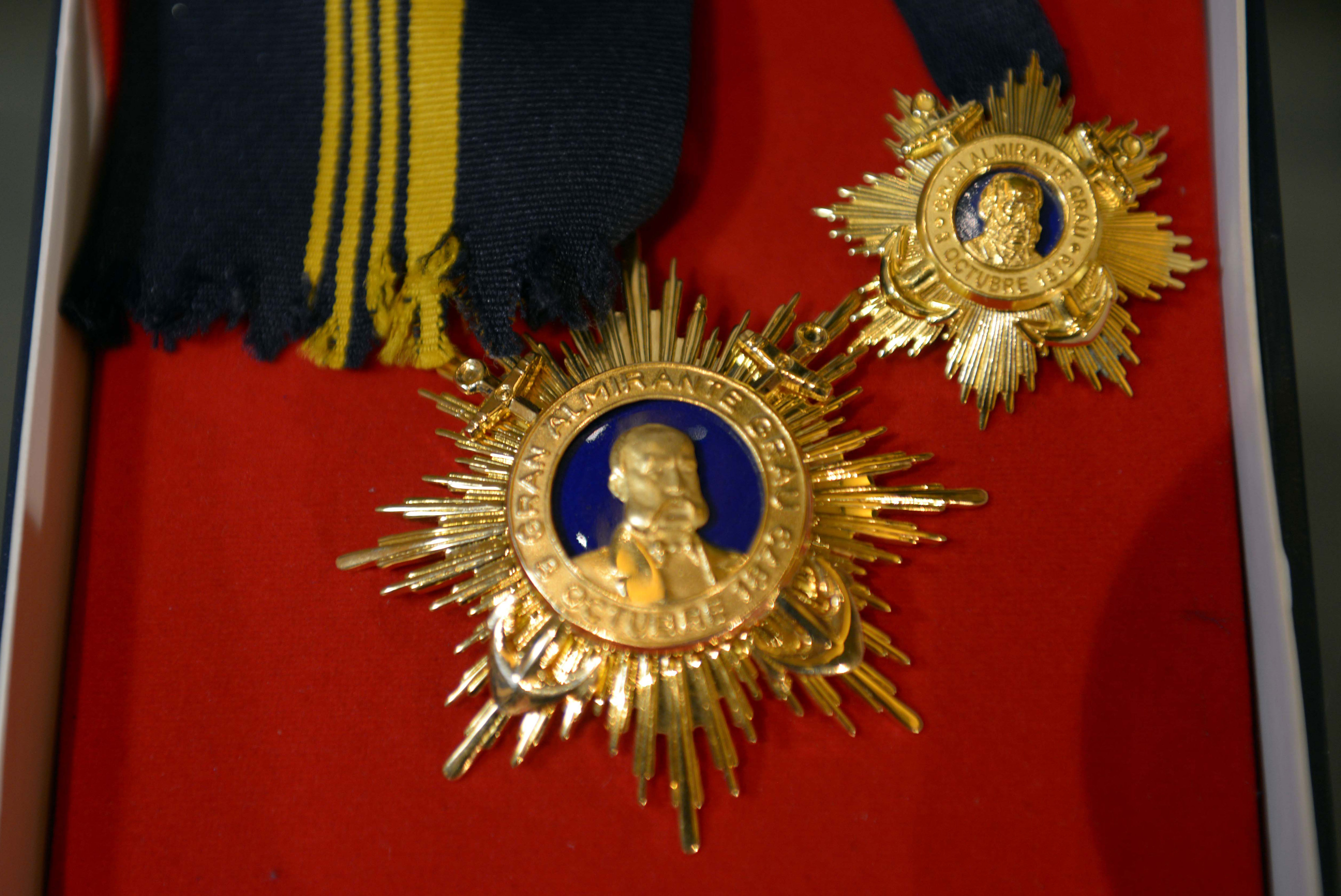
Orden Gran Almirante Grau (Grand Admiral Grau Order)

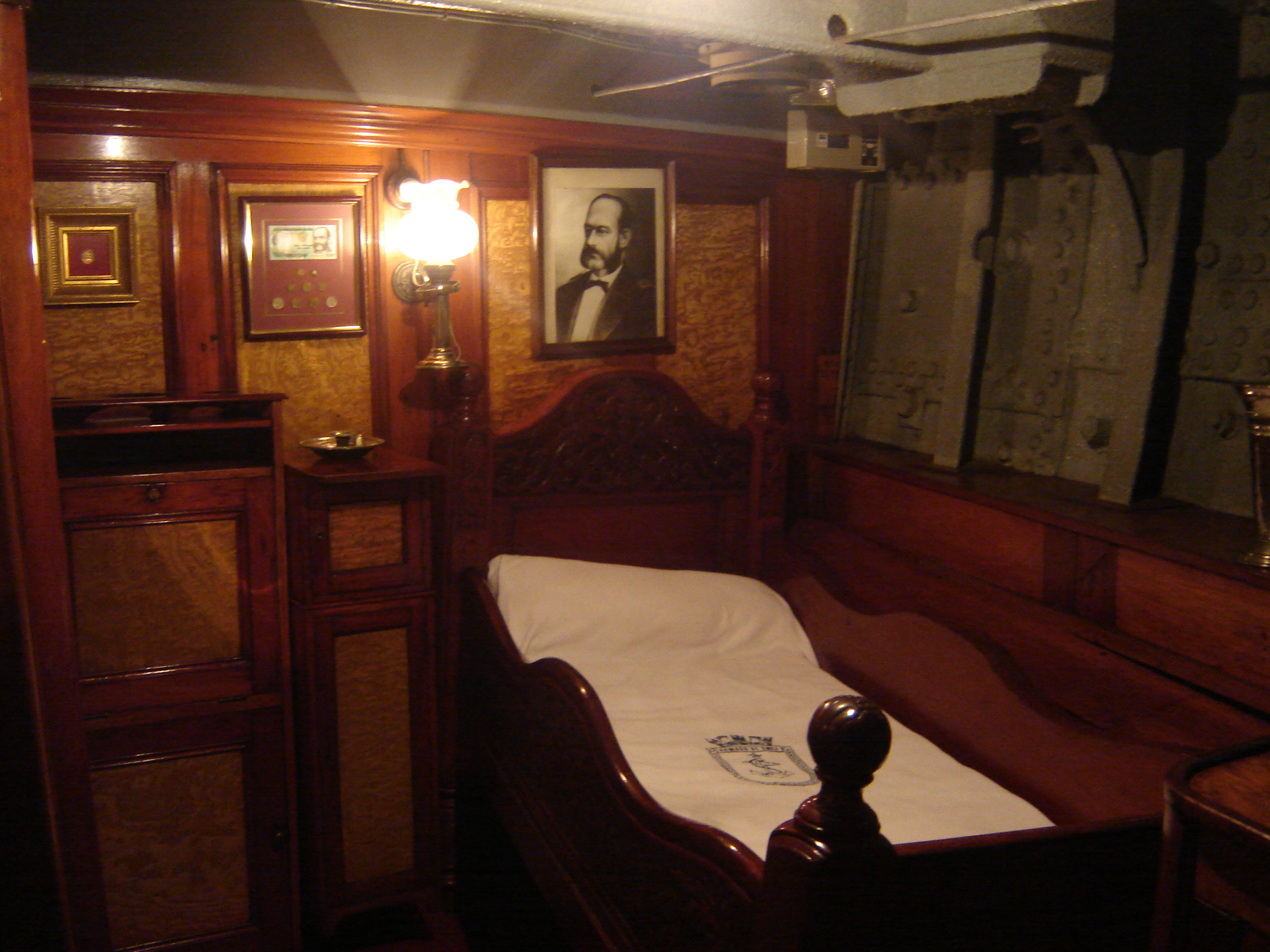
Image of Grau in his personal cabin, at the Monitor Huáscar museum, Talcahuano, Chile.

== Dates of rank ==
Insignia	Rank	Annotations	Date
	Alférez de fragata		4 March 1856
	Teniente segundo		13 September 1863
	Teniente primero		4 December 1863
	Capitán de corbeta		31 March 1865
	Capitán de fragata		22 July 1865
	Capitán de navío		25 July 1868
	Contraalmirante	declined	26 August 1879
	Almirante	posthumous	26 October 1946
	Gran almirante del Perú	posthumous	24 November 1967

== Bibliography ==
- Arosemena, Geraldo (1979). El Almirante Miguel Grau (7th ed.). Lima, Peru: Banco de Crédito del Perú.
- Robert Gardiner (editorial director), Conway's All the World's Fighting Ships 1860–1905. London: Conway Maritime Press, 1979. ISBN 0-85177-605-1.
- Robert Hutchinson (editor), Jane's Warship Recognition Guide, Revised Edition. New York and London: HarperCollins, 2002. ISBN 0-00-713722-2
- Richard Begazo Salas and Raymond V.B. Blackman (editors), Jane's Fighting Ships 1949–50. New York: The McGraw-Hill Book Company, 1949.
- de la Puente, José Agustín (2003). Miguel Grau (in Spanish). Lima: Instituto de Estudios Históricos-Marítimos del Perú. ISBN 9972-633-02-0.
- Seminario, Miguel (2000). "GRAU SEMINARIO, Miguel". Grandes Forjadores del Perú (in Spanish) (1st ed.). Lima, Peru: LEXUS editores. ISBN 9972-625-50-8.
- Schenoni, Luis L. (2024). Bringing War Back In: Victory, Defeat, and the State in Nineteenth-Century Latin America. Cambridge University Press. ISBN 9781009442145.
