= Carlos Ferreyros =

Peruvian Navy officer and politician (1843–1910)

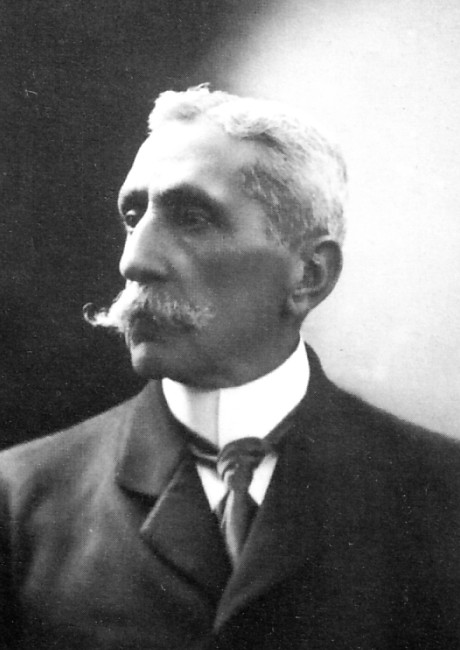

Senator of the Department of Huánuco
- In office July 28, 1907 – February 6, 1910
- President: Augusto Leguía
- Vice President: Eugenio Larrabure y Unanue

Personal details
- Born: August 12, 1843 Lima, Lima Province, Peru
- Died: February 5, 1910 (aged 66) Lima, Lima Province, Peru
- Education: Peruvian Naval School

Military service
- Allegiance: Peru
- Branch: Peruvian Navy
- Years of service: 1860 – 1910
- Rank: Captain
- Commands: BAP Pilcomayo
- Battles/wars: Chincha Islands War: Battle of Abtao; War of the Pacific: Naval campaign of the War of the Pacific; Capture of the corvette Pilcomayo (surrendered); Lima campaign; Battle of San Juan and Chorrillos; Battle of Miraflores

Carlos Ferreyros y Senra (August 12, 1843 — February 5, 1910) was a Peruvian Navy officer and politician. He was the commander of the gunboat Pilcomayo during the War of the Pacific, commanding it before its capture. He was also a Senator of the Department of Huánuco from July 28, 1907, to February 6, 1910, where he died in office.

== Biography ==
Carlos was the son of Manuel Bartolomé Ferreyros, a politician and diplomat and María Josefa Basilia de Senra y Echevarría. He was born in the city of Lima and was baptized Carlos Francisco Hipólito.

After completing his studies, he entered the Peruvian Naval School at the age of fifteen, as a midshipman, following in the footsteps of his older brother Manuel Ferreyros. In October 1860, he graduated as a midshipman from the navy and went on to serve aboard the BAP Amazonas. In November 1861, he traveled to the United Kingdom as part of the commission in charge of supervising the construction of four river steamers destined for the Amazon, returning aboard the Morona.

In 1864 he was promoted to lieutenant and in 1865, to first lieutenant. During that period, he served on the Tumbes, Loa and General Lerzundi.

During the Chincha Islands War, he was present at the Battle of Abtao, aboard the frigate BAP América. In the battle, the Peruvian-Chilean fleet pushed back the Spanish squadron. Carlos's older brother, Manuel Ferreyros, commanded the América, which made "the most accurate shots, with the longest range and the most effect", as the head of the Spanish squadron himself pointed out. He then temporarily resigned his commission, along with other sailors, as a result of the protest against the election of the American John R. Tucker as commander of the squadron, he rejoined the navy in 1868, as second commander of the América, on which he served until her shipwreck during the Arica tsunami of August 13, 1868.

During this disaster, his younger brother Eusebio Ferreyros Senra, who was serving on the ship as a midshipman, died; his body took 37 days to be found.

In November 1868, he traveled to the United States, as a member of the crew in charge of bringing the monitors BAP Manco Cápac and BAP Atahualpa. He was appointed second commander of the latter and later became assistant to the general commander of the division, aboard the corvette BAP Unión. He was promoted to lieutenant commander in 1869 and was promoted to frigate captain in 1870 and assumed command of the schooner BAP Tumbes.

In July 1872, along with the other chiefs of the Navy, including Miguel Grau Seminario and Aurelio García y García, he opposed the Rebellion of Colonels Gutiérrez, supporting the historic manifesto of the Navy given on that occasion. The coup failed, and the elected candidate, Manuel Pardo, assumed the presidency of Peru.

In August 1872 he became commander of the BAP Chalaco. In July 1877, he was promoted to graduate ship captain .

At the outbreak of the War of the Pacific, he participated in the Naval campaign of the War of the Pacific, serving aboard the small 600-ton gunboat Pilcomayo. Said ship, together with the corvette Unión, participated in the naval Battle of Chipana, against the Chilean corvette Magallanes of 950 tons. It was the first naval encounter of the war and took place on April 12, 1879, resulting in a firefight without major casualties.

On July 4 of that same year, Ferreyros, as captain of the ship and commander of the Pilcomayo, left Arica for Pisagua, guarding the Oroya transport. He then entered Chilean waters, where he carried out a brilliant naval action on July 6 as he reached Tocopilla, set fire to 13 boats and sank the Chilean brigantine Matilde Ramos, prior to disembarkation of its crew. Furthermore, he landed troops at the port to stock up on coal, announcing in advance that he would not bombard the town if unprovoked. After finishing his task, and already leaving Tocopilla, the Pilcomayo was discovered by the Chilean ironclad Blanco Encalada but the Pilcomayo was superior in speed, from which she managed to escape after 20 hours of pursuit, reaching Arica without any damage.

Ferreyros's action caused unease in Chile, which had a navy superior in number and power to its Peruvian counterpart, and with which it hoped to obtain victory in a short time. However, due to the actions of the Peruvian sailors with Grau at the head, the war lasted longer than it should have. The Venezuelan historian Jacinto López stated about the feat of the Pilcomayo:

The fragile Peruvian gunboat “Pilcomayo” had ridiculed the power of the Chilean squad; he had proved that command of the sea was questionable; he had mocked the Chilean blockade ships, passing through Iquique with impunity, reaching almost as far as Cobija, that is to say, he had ignored with heroic disdain the lordship of the Chilean battleships that in Antofagasta and Iquique had established themselves as absolute owners of those waters.

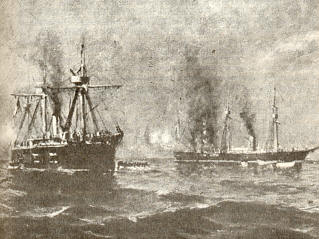
Capture of the corvette Pilcomayo

.

On November 17, 1879, the Pilcomayo, the Unión and the Chalaco returned to Callao by order of the Peruvian president, Mariano Ignacio Prado. However, on November 18 they were ambushed by the Chilean squad, and the Pilcomayo was pursued and captured while the other two ships managed to escape. Ferreyros wanted to burn and sink the gunboat, but the Chileans from the 3,560-ton ironclad Almirante Cochrane boarded the ship and prevented its collapse in time. Ferreyros and his crew went to Chile as prisoners of war, while the gunboat became integrated into the Chilean Navy. The news of the capture of the Pilcomayo was greeted with joy in Chile.

In December 1879, Ferreyros returned to Peru through a prisoner exchange. A summary trial for the loss of the gunboat followed, being acquitted on July 31, 1880. He participated in the defense of the capital, fighting in the battles of San Juan and Miraflores in January 1881.

After his military career, in 1888 he was appointed a member of the Lima Public Welfare Society, which he presided over between 1894 and 1896. He was Prefect of the departments of Lambayeque and La Libertad and of the constitutional province of Callao. He was also Director General of Posts and Telegraphs in 1901.

He was part of the Reorganizing Meeting of the Civil Party on May 10, 1896, and being elected a member of its new Directive Committee that ultimately brought Manuel Candamo Iriarte to power, elected President of Peru in 1903. He was then elected as Senator of the Peruvian Republic the for Department of Huánuco in 1907 by the Civil Party but he died on February 6, 1910, in office of the Second Vice Presidency of his Chamber.

== Personal life ==
He was married to Rosa Ayulo Mendivil, with whom he had several children, including Manuel, Alfredo, Carlos, Alberto, Luis and Enrique Ferreyros Ayulo; the latter, founder in 1922 of the important Peruvian company Ferreyros. He also had two daughters, Rosa Ferreyros and María Isabel F. de Swayne.
