= Nicolás Portal =

Peruvian captain (???–1892)

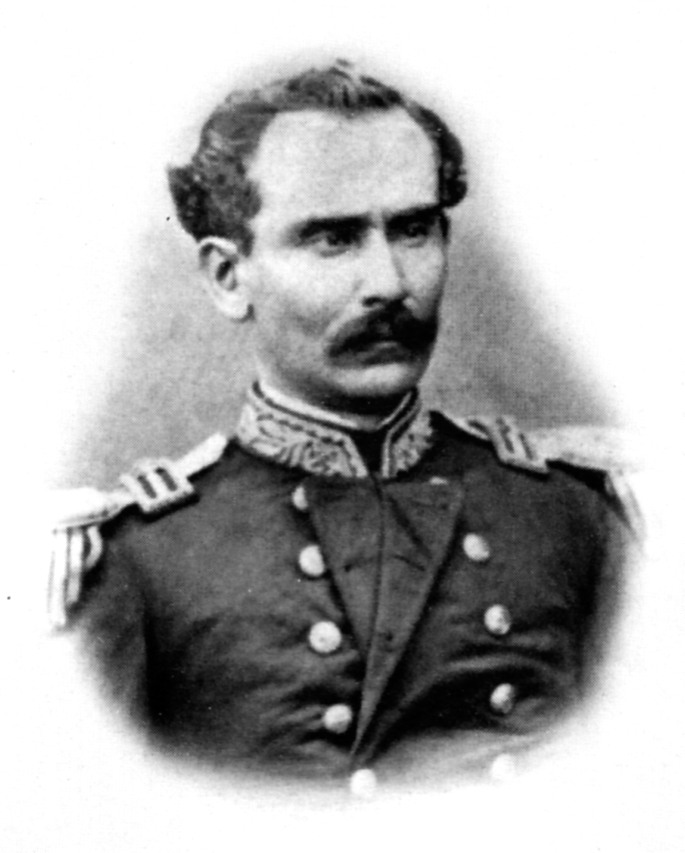
- Born: Unknown; Ica, Department of Ica, Peru
- Died: August 13, 1892; Lima, Lima Province, Peru
- Military career
- Allegiance: Peru
- Branch: Peruvian Navy
- Service years: 1853 – 1881
- Rank: Captain
- Conflicts: War of the Pacific: Naval campaign of the War of the Pacific; Capture of the corvette Pilcomayo

Nicolás Federico Portal was a Peruvian captain and politician during the War of the Pacific. He is known for being the captain of the BAP Unión throughout the war.

== Biography ==
Entering military service in 1853, he made midshipman of steamer Izcuchaca in 1853 and was promoted to frigate lieutenant on 1856. He served on the ship Vigilante in 1857. Then he successively embarked on the brigantine Martina on 1859 and on the barque Iquique, as a detail officer on 1860. He was promoted to second lieutenant in 1862 and transferred to the frigate Arica, also as a detail officer. On board said frigate, in May 1862 he traveled to the United Kingdom, commissioned to bring the newly built river steamers, which were destined to patrol the Amazon Rivers. He towed the brigantine Próspero from Pará to Iquitos and commanded the steamer Pastaza. He established the shipping line between Yurimaguas and Pará.

He was promoted to effective first lieutenant in 1864 and to corvette captain in 1865. On May 21, 1866, he returned to Callao and was attached to the General Command of the Navy. That same year he was named successively commander of the steamship Sachaca and second commander of the corvette BAP América.

He was sent on commission to Europe and the United States in 1867, returning the following year. He was then sent on commission to the south of Peru in order to provide assistance to the population as a result of the terrible earthquake that occurred on August 13, 1868. In November he was assigned to most of the Plaza del Callao under the orders of Colonel Tomás Gutiérrez.

He was appointed port captain of the Chincha Islands and then of Iquique in 1869. That same year he was sent to Saint Thomas to take charge of the Marañón transport, which towed the monitor Manco Cápac bound for Callao from New Orleans. He fulfilled his mission by arriving at the port of Chalaco in May 1870.

He was promoted to frigate captain in 1870 and was appointed commander of the monitor Manco Cápac. In 1871 he became commander of the corvette Unión, with which he began a trip for the UK to make repairs, starting on November 30, 1872, and returning in 1873. In May 1875, he accidentally occupied the command of Chalaco carrying out the drilling of the coast from Callao to Loa to install the submarine cable and by July, he returned to the Unión.

In 1876 he was promoted to captain of an effective ship. In 1877 he was appointed prefect of Tarapacá and in 1878, of Amazonas.

The War of the Pacific broke out in April 1879 and became commander of the Unión once again. It was part of the Second Peruvian Squadron along with the Pilcomayo. The division was commanded by Captain Aurelio García y García, who hoisted his ensign in the Unión.

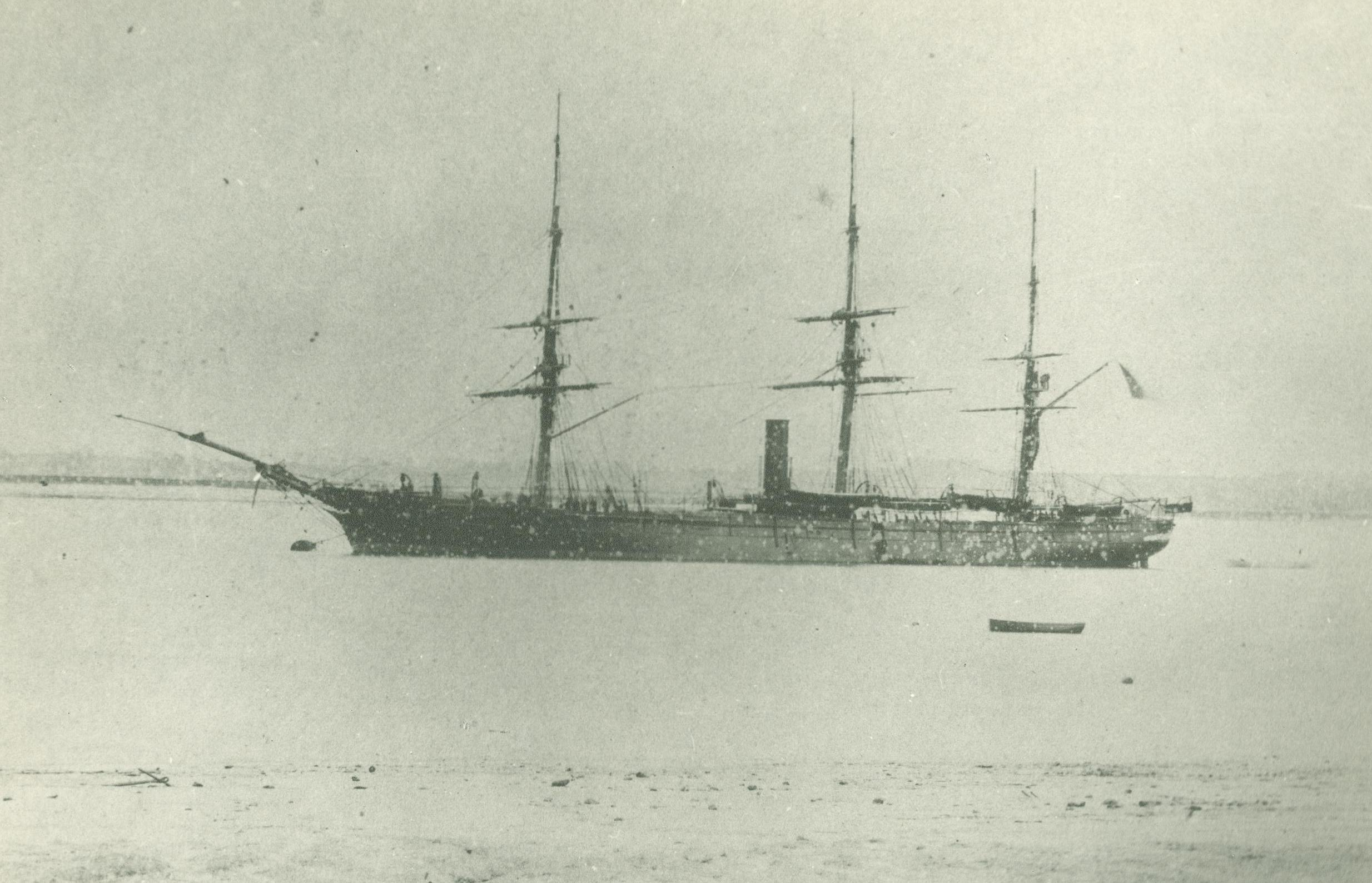
The corvette Unión

Portal, under the command of the Unión, participated in the Battle of Chipana, which was the first naval confrontation of the war on April 12, 1879. After maintenance work on his ship, which lasted three months, he accompanied the monitor Huáscar and Miguel Grau on raids along the Chilean coast. Between July and August he made the famous trip to Punta Arenas, in the extreme south of the continent, with the mission of intercepting a Chilean arms transport, a mission that he could not accomplish, because it had gone ahead.

At the beginning of the Battle of Angamos, when the Huáscar and the Unión were surrounded by the Chilean fleet, the Unión, following the war instructions established for such circumstances, escaped for Arica, being pursued by the Chilean corvettes Loa and O 'Higgins, who abandoned the pursuit at Huanillos, due to the greater speed of the Peruvian corvette on October 8, 1879.

On December 8, 1879, Portal left the command of the Unión and went on to serve in the batteries of Callao, until August 1880, when he became captain of the port of Pisco. After the Chilean occupation, he was left without employment

After the war ended and the process of National Reconstruction began as he was appointed general agent and sub-administrator of the Lake Titicaca steamships in 1888. In 1890, he was appointed Prefect of Áncash. In 1891 he became inspector of the captaincies.
