= Four Aces =

Four Aces may refer to:

- Four Aces or Tribe of the Four Aces, a soldier of The 82nd Airborne Division who has deployed with the Division and wears an 82nd patch on both arms of their uniform.
- Four Aces (passenger liners), a series of 1929–1931 American cruise ships, later converted to World War II military transport
- The Four Aces, an American male pop music quartet from 1950
- The Four Aces Club, a pioneering music venue in Dalston, London
- Four Aces (casino), a casino in South Dakota
- Four Aces (bridge), a 1930s American contract bridge team led by David Burnstine (later to become David Bruce)
- The Four Aces, a nickname for Peruvian Navy members Miguel Grau, Lizardo Montero, Aurelio García and Manuel Ferreyros.
- A variety of card trick involving the four aces.
- Timken 1111, a steam locomotive also called the "Timken Four Aces".
- 4 asa, a Croatian music group

== See also ==
- Aces Four, an Irish thoroughbred racehorse born 1999
