= Capture of the corvette Pilcomayo =

Battle of the Naval campaign of the War of the Pacific

Capture of the Pilcomayo
- Part of Naval campaign of the War of the Pacific
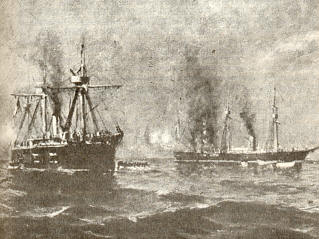
- The capture of the Pilcomayo by the Blanco Encalada
Date	November 18, 1879
Location	Mollendo, Arequipa, Peru
Result	Chilean victory

Belligerents
Peru	Chile

Commanders and leaders
Nicolás Portal; Carlos Ferreyros (surrendered); Manuel Villavicencio	Galvarino Riveros; Luis Anacleto Castillo

Strength
1 corvette (Unión); 1 gunboat (Pilcomayo); 1 transport (BAP Chalaco)	1 ironclad (Blanco Encalada)

Casualties and losses
2 lightly wounded, 167 captured, 1 gunboat captured (Note: Sailor Pedro Álvarez and Corporal 1st Rufino Chuquihuanca were slightly injured with a bullet to the face and another to the right wrist respectively.)	None

The Capture of the corvette Pilcomayo was a battle of the Naval campaign of the War of the Pacific. In the battle, the Peruvian gunboat Pilcomayo was captured by the Chilean ironclad Blanco Encalada after a brief confrontation.

== Background ==
With the capture of the Huáscar, Chile obtained a wide advantage in the sea, which would seek to prevent the allies from concentrating their armies in southern Peru. In this way, the political objective of the war was more ambitious for the Chileans, and it was not only sought to ensure Chilean sovereignty between parallels 23 and 25 South, but also to obtain favorable territorial compensation.

With this, the Chilean army imposed the need to seek the destruction of the Peruvian-Bolivian forces present in Tarapacá, starting the Tarapacá campaign. Within this, the assault and Battle of Pisagua occurred on November 2, 1879, an operation that culminated in the Chilean occupation of the place.

In this context, the Chilean Navy was careful to maintain free control of the sea to facilitate its own maritime transport and prevent that of the allies, in such a way as to isolate the adversary forces in the region.

== Order of Battle ==
=== Peru ===
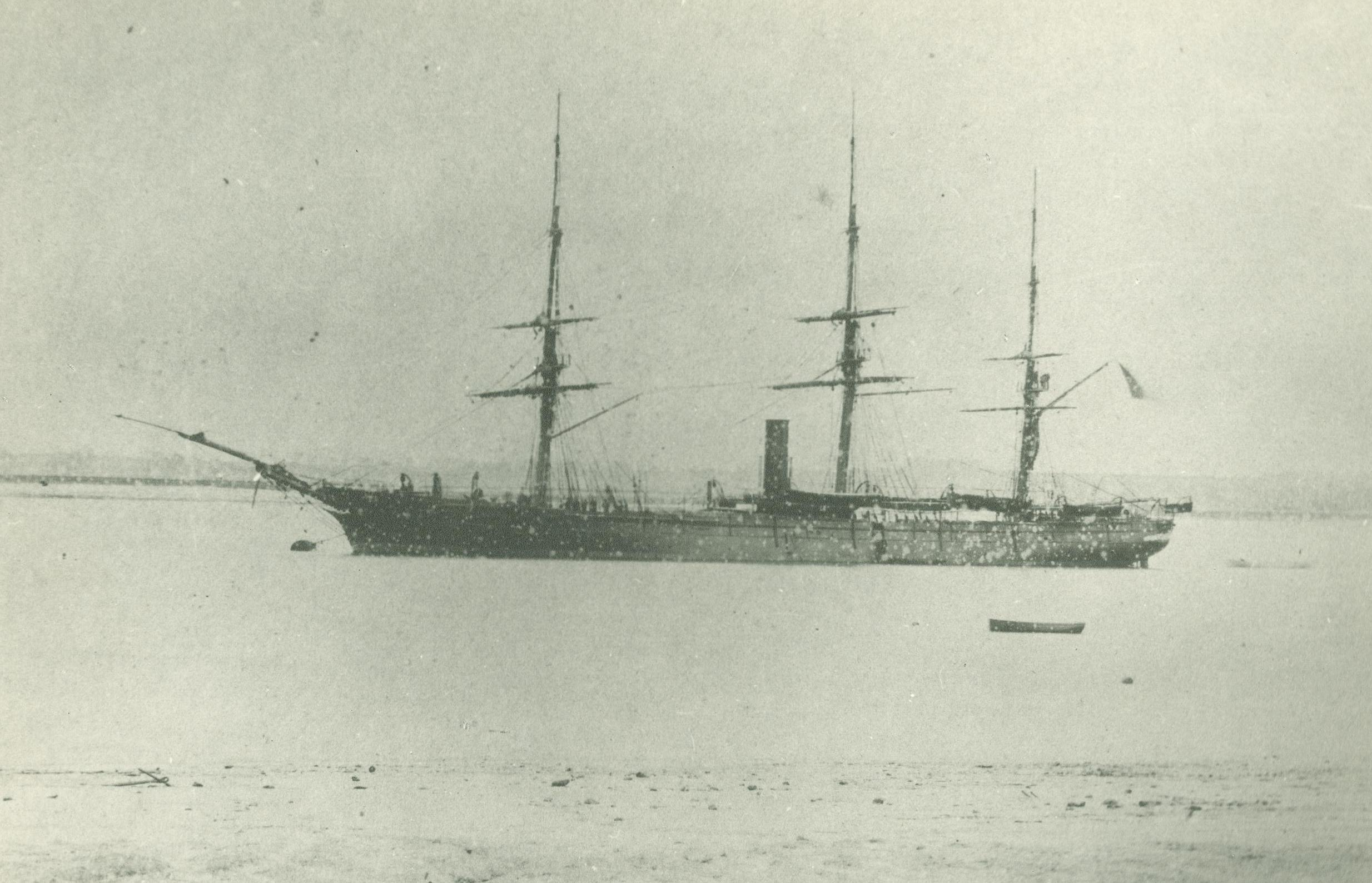

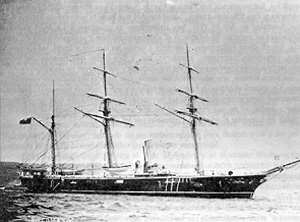

Peruvian commanders
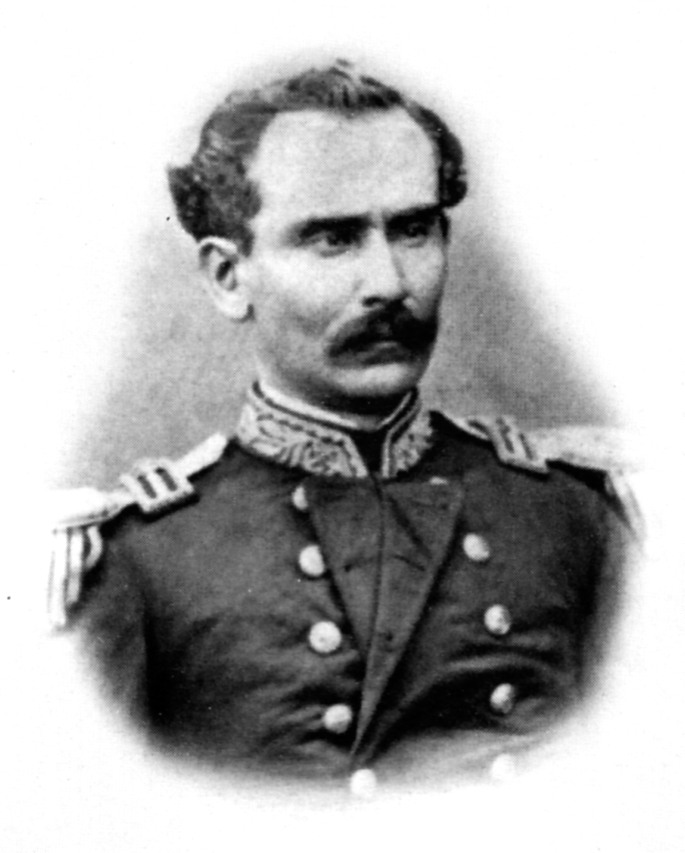
Cpt.
Nicolás Portal
(Unión)

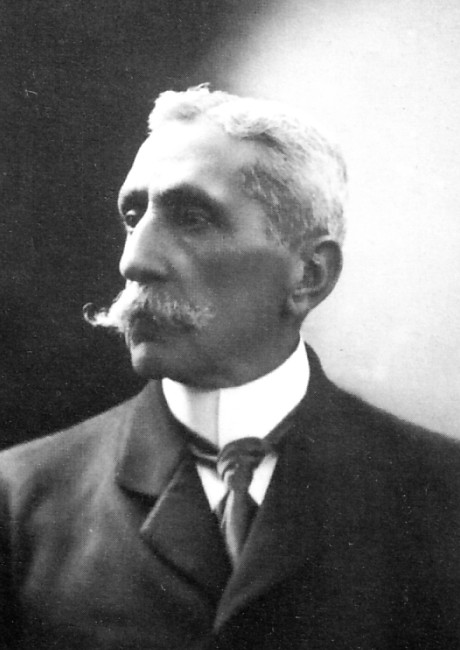
Cpt.
Carlos Ferreyros
(Pilcomayo)

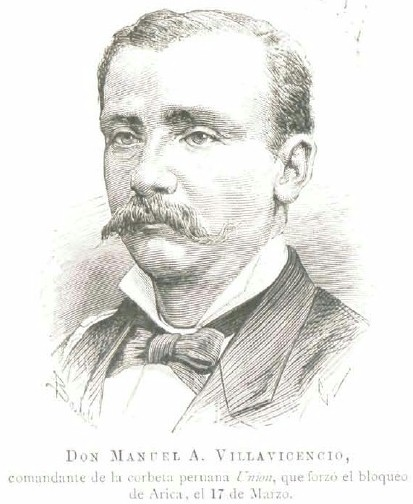
Frig. Cpt.
Manuel Villavicencio
(Chalaco)

The Unión was a corvette built in 1865, with a wooden hull protected with iron and copper. She displaced 2016 t and had 12 muzzle-loading 70 lb Voruz rifled guns as main armament, in the battery and 6 per side. She also had two 70 lb Armstrong guns in the bow and a 9 lb Withworth muzzle-loading gun. Her propulsion system was also mixed with a propeller and being able to reach a maximum speed of 13 kn. She was commanded by Captain Nicolás Portal.

The Pilcomayo gunboat was a ship built in 1874 and was armed with two 70-pound Armstrong muzzle-loading guns, one on each side of the ship and four 40-pound muzzle-loading guns, two on each side, also rifled, and a Gatling gun. On the day of the fight, her speed was 11 kn. She was under the command of the ship's captain Carlos Ferreyros.

The Chalaco had an iron hull 90.4 m (297 ft) long that displaced 999 t. Her propulsion system was mixed, steam with double wheel and sail. Her machine allowed her to reach a walking speed of 12 kn. Her armament consisted of four 30-pound Parrott guns, two in the bow and two in the stern, and two 70-pound guns in the sundeck. She was under the command of frigate captain Manuel Villavicencio.

Country	Name	Commander	Type	Displacement	Speed	Armament
Peru	Unión (1865)	Captain; Nicolás Portal	Corvette	2,016 t (1,984 long tons; 2,222 short tons)	13 Knots	12 70 lb Voruz cannons
Peru	Unión (1865)	Captain; Nicolás Portal	Corvette	2,016 t (1,984 long tons; 2,222 short tons)	13 Knots	2 70 lb Armstrong cannons
Peru	Unión (1865)	Captain; Nicolás Portal	Corvette	2,016 t (1,984 long tons; 2,222 short tons)	13 Knots	1 9 lb Withworth cannon
Peru	Pilcomayo (1874)	Captain; Carlos Ferreyros	Corvette (Note: The Pilcomayo was classified as a corvette due to its rigging, however it is commonly called a gunboat)	600 t (590 long tons; 660 short tons)	11 Knots	2 70 lb Armstrong guns
Peru	Pilcomayo (1874)	Captain; Carlos Ferreyros	Corvette	600 t (590 long tons; 660 short tons)	11 Knots	4 lb cannons
Peru	Pilcomayo (1874)	Captain; Carlos Ferreyros	Corvette	600 t (590 long tons; 660 short tons)	11 Knots	1 Gatling gun
Peru	Chalaco (1864)	Frigate Captain; Manuel Villavicencio	Vapor de ruedas	999 t (983 long tons; 1,101 short tons)	12 Knots	4 30 lb Parrott guns
Peru	Chalaco (1864)	Frigate Captain; Manuel Villavicencio	Vapor de ruedas	999 t (983 long tons; 1,101 short tons)	12 Knots	2 70 lb guns

=== Chile ===
Chilean commanders
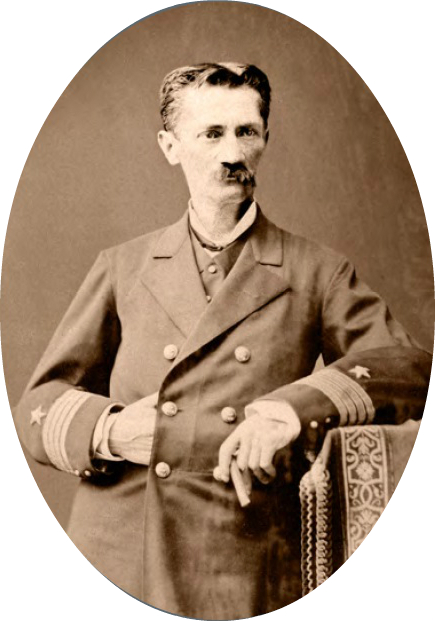
Adm.
Galvarino Riveros
(Blanco Encalada)

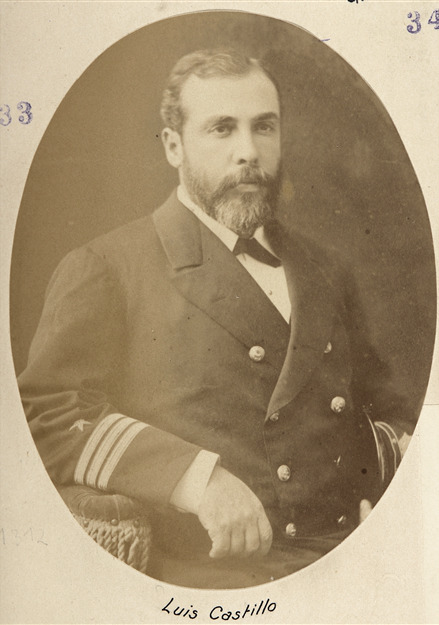
Cor. Cpt.
Luis Anacleto Castillo
(Blanco Encalada)

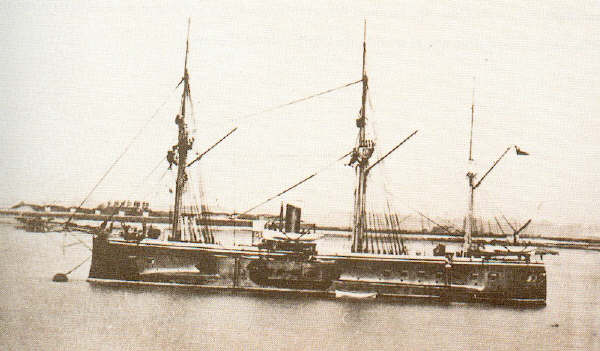

The Blanco Encalada was a 64 m-long (210 ft), 3,560 t armored frigate with a double steel hull. She had 9-inch-thick (23 cm) armor in the center and 4.5-inch-thick (11 cm) armor in the bow and stern. Her armament consisted of six Armstrong muzzle-loading 250 lb rifled guns in a central battery (three per band), two 20 lb rifled guns and two 7 lb guns. Her propulsion system was mixed, steam with double propeller and sail, being able to reach a maximum speed of 9 kn. On the day of the combat, she was commanded by Admiral Galvarino Riveros.

Country	Name	Commander	Type	Displacement	Speed	Armament
Chile	Blanco Encalada (1875)	Almirante; Galvarino Riveros; Capitán de Corbeta; Luis Anacleto Castillo Goñi	Ironclad	3.560 t (3.504 long tons; 3.924 short tons)	9 Knots	6 250 lb Armstrong guns
Chile	Blanco Encalada (1875)	Almirante; Galvarino Riveros; Capitán de Corbeta; Luis Anacleto Castillo Goñi	Ironclad	3.560 t (3.504 long tons; 3.924 short tons)	9 Knots	2 20 lb guns
Chile	Blanco Encalada (1875)	Almirante; Galvarino Riveros; Capitán de Corbeta; Luis Anacleto Castillo Goñi	Ironclad	3.560 t (3.504 long tons; 3.924 short tons)	9 Knots	2 7 lb guns

== The Capture ==
The Pilcomayos smokes were seen at Mollendo by the Blanco Encalada while conducting a reconnaissance mission and soon enough, spotted the Pilcomayo, the Unión and the BAP Chalacowere identified. Knowing that the Blanco Encalada was superior to all three ships, they began to head south.

When the Commander of the Pilcomayo, Carlos Ferreyros realized that the distance was rapidly closing, he gathered his officers in council, agreeing to sink the ship before surrendering, beating a retreat in order to have enough time to execute the plan.

Being at 5,000 meters, the Pilcomayo opened fire in elevation without damaging the Blanco Encalada. The Chilean ironclad did not open fire until 4,200 m (13,800 ft), reaching the peak of the Peruvian corvette's foremast. At the same time, Commander Ferreyros had the bottom valves opened to flood the engine and magazine and ordered all kinds of flammable material to be spilled to set the ship on fire. The aft guns were aimed over the wardroom hatch to pierce the hull below the waterline. He then arranged for the ship's codes, correspondence and documents to be destroyed.

Soon enough, the fire started and the ship was stopped and the crew lowered the boats to disembark the ship. When Chilean Admiral Riveros saw signals with white flags being made from the boats, he ordered a ceasefire and the machine to stop so that Lieutenant Roberto Goñi could board the Peruvian ship.

Boarding the Pilcomayo, Goñi replaced the Peruvian emblem with the Chilean emblem and dedicated all his efforts to save the ship, mooring it to the Blanco Encalada so that with its bilge pumps it would prevent its sinking and simultaneously reinforce the personnel that put out the fires. In two hours they managed to cover the waterways with divers and put out the fires.

Subsequently, the Chileans continued to take it in tow to the port of Pisagua, arriving on November 20, where the Peruvian prisoners were embarked on the Vapor Loa and then heading to the port of Valparaíso with the Pilcomayo, landing on December 4, to the joy of the population that invaded the streets to pay homage to the victorious sailors. In the port, the already ex-Peruvian ship would receive many repairs.
