= List of shipwrecks in May 1880 =

The list of shipwrecks in May 1880 includes ships sunk, foundered, grounded, or otherwise lost during May 1880.

== 1 May ==
List of shipwrecks: 1 May 1880
Ship	State	Description
Thorndean	United Kingdom	The full-rigged ship was wrecked by ice at La Poile, Newfoundland Colony. Her crew were rescued. She was on a voyage from Genoa, Italy to Quebec City, Canada.

== 2 May ==
List of shipwrecks: 2 May 1880
Ship	State	Description
Amalia	United Kingdom	The steamship ran aground at Constantinople, Ottoman Empire and was wrecked.
Kong Oscar	Norway	The barque foundered in the Atlantic Ocean. Her crew were rescued by the schooner Bois Rose (France). Kong Oscar was on a voyage from Newport, Monmouthshire, United Kingdom to Quebec City, Canada.

== 3 May ==
List of shipwrecks: 3 May 1880
Ship	State	Description
Abel	Norway	The barque was abandoned in the Atlantic Ocean. Her crew were rescued by the barque Island Home ( Canada. Abel was on a voyage from Newport, Monmouthshire, United Kingdom to New York, United States. She was discovered on 6 May by the barque Burmah (United Kingdom), which put six of her crew on board. They took her in to Crookhaven, County Cork, United Kingdom on 15 May.
Lucie	Germany	The barque was driven ashore on Saltholmen, Denmark. She was on a voyage from Stettin to Newport, Monmouthshire.

== 4 May ==
List of shipwrecks: 4 May 1880
Ship	State	Description
Conovium	United Kingdom	The schooner hit rocks off Lizard Point, Cornwall and was wrecked. Her five crew rowed to Penzance in the ship's boat. She was on a voyage from London to Dublin. Her captain had miscalculated the ship's position. He blamed the intensity of the light from the Lizard Lighthouse.
Elizabeth McClure	United Kingdom	The ship was driven ashore in the Larne Lough.
Helene Newton	United Kingdom	The steamship ran aground at Öland, Sweden. She was on a voyage from Sunderland, County Durham to Stockholm, Sweden. She was refloated and completed her voyage, subsequently being placed under repair.
Mary Driver	United Kingdom	The steamship foundered in the Mediterranean Sea off Bizerta, Beylik of Tunis with the loss of two of her crew. Survivors were rescued by local fishing boats. She was on a voyage from Alexandria, Egypt to Gibraltar.
Sea Queen	United Kingdom	The barquentine was destroyed by fire at sea 40 nautical miles (74 km) east of "Desart Island". Her crew were rescued by Arab (United Kingdom). Sea Queen was on a voyage from Antwerp, Belgium to "Buland".

== 5 May ==
List of shipwrecks: 5 May 1880
Ship	State	Description
Brilliant	Germany	The brigantine was driven ashore at Port Elizabeth, Colony of Natal. Her crew were rescued. She was consequently condemned.
Little Lizzie	United Kingdom	The ship was driven ashore at "Ahquay", Africa. She was plundered by the local inhabitants.
Nimrod	(United Kingdom of Great Britain and Ireland) Jersey	The sloop was driven ashore on the Kent coast. She was on a voyage from London to Barnstaple, Devon. She was refloated and assisted in to Ramsgate, Kent in a leaky condition.
Pride of the Isles	United Kingdom	The schooner ran aground on the Scroby Sands, Norfolk. She was refloated with the assistance of a tug and the Gorleston Lifeboat, but consequently sank. Her six crew were rescued. Pride of the Isles was on a voyage from Sunderland, County Durham to Bridport, Dorset.
Queen	United Kingdom	The schooner ran aground on the Goodwin Sands, Kent. She was on a voyage from Middlesbrough, Yorkshire to Cardiff, Glamorgan. She was refloated and put in to Dover, Kent in a leaky condition.
Seadrift	United Kingdom	The ship was sighted off The Lizard, Cornwall whilst on a voyage from South Shields, County Durham to the River Plate. No further trace, reported missing.
Unnamed	Flag unknown	The barque ran aground on the Goodwin Sands. She was refloated and taken in to Ramsgate.

== 6 May ==
List of shipwrecks: 6 May 1880
Ship	State	Description
Batavia	United Kingdom	The steamship was damaged by fire at Liverpool, Lancashire.
Colleen Bawn	New Zealand	The schooner was presumed to have foundered on this date with the loss of all seven crew; distress lights having been sighted. She was on a voyage from Wellington to Havelock.
Lady Tyler	United Kingdom	The paddle steamer ran aground on the Black Middens, off the mouth of the River Tyne. She was refloated the next day.
Unnamed	France	The fishing smack was wrecked off Alderney, Channel Islands. Her crew were rescued by the steamship Courier (United Kingdom).

== 7 May ==
List of shipwrecks: 7 May 1880
Ship	State	Description
Consett	United Kingdom	The steamship was wrecked on the Suadiva Atoll, in the Maldive Islands. Her crew were rescued by a brig. She was on a voyage from Bassein, India to Port Said, Egypt.
Niord	Flag unknown	The derelict and waterlogged ship was discovered in the North Sea by the smack Equity (United Kingdom). She was subsequently towed in to IJmuiden, North Holland, Netherlands by the steamship Eddystone (United Kingdom).
Whimper	United Kingdom	The smack collided with the schooner Hermine (Germany) and was abandoned in the North Sea. Her six crew were rescued by Hermine.

== 8 May ==
List of shipwrecks: 8 May 1880
Ship	State	Description
Ostsee	Germany	The steamship was holed by ice in the Baltic Sea. She was on a voyage from Lübeck to Saint Petersburg, Russia. She was towed in to Kronstadt.
Rappelez-vous-de-moi	France	The cutter was wrecked on Alderney, Channel Islands. Her three crew were rescued by the steamship Courier ( (United Kingdom of Great Britain and Ireland) Guernsey).

== 9 May ==
List of shipwrecks: 9 May 1880
Ship	State	Description
Aroya	Peruvian Navy	War of the Pacific: The transport ship was shelled and damaged at Callao by a squadron of ships comprising Amazonas, Angamos, Blanco Encalada, Huáscar, O'Higgins and Pilcomayo (all Chilean Navy).
Helena	Peru	War of the Pacific: The barque was shelled and damaged at Callao by the ironclad Huáscar (Chilean Navy).
Sancey Pecke	Peru	War of the Pacific: The brigantine was shelled and sunk at Callao by Huáscar (Chilean Navy).
Unión	Peruvian Navy	War of the Pacific: The corvette was shelled and set afire at Callao by Huáscar and Pilcomayo (both Chilean Navy).

== 10 May ==
List of shipwrecks: 10 May 1880
Ship	State	Description
Algerian	United Kingdom	The steamship caught fire in the Mediterranean Sea and put in to Gibraltar, where the fire was extinguished. She was on a voyage from Alexandria, Egypt to Liverpool, Lancashire.
Edith Troop	United Kingdom	The ship was sighted off Cape Hatteras, North Carolina, United States whilst on a voyage from New Orleans, Louisiana, United States to Calais, France. No further trace, reported missing, presumed foundered with the loss of all 40 crew.
Swiftsure	United Kingdom	The steamship was driven ashore at Cape Charles, Virginia, United States. She was on a voyage from Bône, Algeria to Baltimore, Maryland, United States.

== 11 May ==
List of shipwrecks: 11 May 1880
Ship	State	Description
Freia	Norway	The schooner ran aground, capsized and became severely hogged at Dover, Kent, United Kingdom. She was on a voyage from Cardiff, Glamorgan, United Kingdom to Riga, Russia. She was refloated and beached for repairs.
Mattea	United Kingdom	The ship ran aground at Maryport, Cumberland. She was on a voyage from Maryport to New York, United States. She was refloated.
Odessa	Russia	The steamship was driven ashore in the Dardanelles. She was on a voyage from London, United Kingdom to Taganrog. She was refloated on 13 May.
Penwith	United Kingdom	The ship departed from Cardiff for the Rio Grande. No further trace, presumed foundered with the loss of all hands.

== 12 May ==
List of shipwrecks: 12 May 1880
Ship	State	Description
Joseph Hazel	United Kingdom	The tug sank at Dublin.
Mari Vagliano	Flag unknown	The steamship ran aground at Cardiff, Glamorgan, United Kingdom whilst avoiding a collision with the schooner Thomas C. Seed (United Kingdom). Mari Vagliano was on a voyage from Cardiff to Constantinople, Ottoman Empire.
Roelfina Tijdens	Netherlands	The schooner was driven ashore and wrecked at Thorpeness, Suffolk, United Kingdom. Her crew were rescued.
Senegal	United Kingdom	The steamship struck a sunken rock off Grando Point, Gran Canaria, Canary Islands and was beached with the loss of one life. Her passengers were taken off by the steamship Teuton (United Kingdom). Senegal was refloated on 2 June and taken in to Las Palmas.
Unnamed	Flag unknown	The brig ran aground on the Maplin Sand, in the North Sea off the coast of Essex, United Kingdom.

== 13 May ==
List of shipwrecks: 13 May 1880
Ship	State	Description
Ornen	Norway	The barque was abandoned in the Atlantic Ocean (30°35′N 13°00′W). Her crew were rescued by Jupiter (United Kingdom). Ornen was on a voyage from Cardiff, Glamorgan, United Kingdom to Bermuda.
Sebastopol	United Kingdom	The barque struck an iceberg and sank in the Atlantic Ocean. Her crew survived. She was on a voyage from Marseille, Bouches-du-Rhône, France to Quebec City, Canada.

== 14 May ==
List of shipwrecks: 14 May 1880
Ship	State	Description
Adelheid	Germany	The schooner was abandoned and drove ashore on Vlieland, Friesland, Netherlands. She was on a voyage from Hamburg to Bordeaux, Gironde, France.
Burlington	United Kingdom	The steamship was run into by the steamship Castor (Sweden at Bordeaux, Gironde, France and was beached on the Queyrie Bank, in the Gironde.
Gesine	Germany	The schooner ran aground at Maassluis, South Holland, Netherlands. She was on a voyage from Rotterdam, South Holland to Königsberg. She was refloated and placed under repair.
Laboramus	United Kingdom	The brig caught fire and was abandoned in the Atlantic Ocean (46°44′N 24°42′W). Her crew were rescued by Arnesnoes (Norway). Laboramus was on a voyage from Doboy, Georgia, United States, to Dundalk, County Louth. She was towed in to Vigo, Spain by the steamship Roelas (Spain) on 12 October.
Ontario	United Kingdom	The ship was driven ashore at Cape Ray, Newfoundland Colony. She was on a voyage from Grangemouth, Stirlingshire to Quebec City, Canada. She was refloated.
Wild Pigeon	United Kingdom	The ship ran aground on the Holywood Bank, in the Belfast Lough. She was on a voyage from Cardiff, Glamorgan to Donaghadee, County Down. She was refloated and resumed her voyage.
Zeemanschoop	Netherlands	The brig was driven ashore and wrecked at Petit Trou, Trinidad.

== 15 May ==
List of shipwrecks: 15 May 1880
Ship	State	Description
Cleadon	United Kingdom	The steamship ran ashore at Cromer, Norfolk. She was on a voyage from Sunderland, County Durham to Ostend, West Flanders, Belgium. She was refloated and resumed her voyage.
Cure	United Kingdom	The smack collided with another vessel and was abandoned off Orfordness, Suffolk. She was subsequently taken in to Harwich, Essex.
Dolphin	Victoria	The ship was driven ashore at Rockingham, Western Australia. She had been refloated by 31 May.
Souvenir	United Kingdom	The barque ran aground on the Kentish Knock. She was on a voyage from Pensacola, Florida, United States to Sunderland. She was refloated with the assistance of a tug and put in to Gravesend, Kent in a leaky condition.

== 16 May ==
List of shipwrecks: 16 May 1880
Ship	State	Description
Regina	Spain	The schooner ran aground on the Horse Sand, in the Solent. She was on a voyage from Bilbao, Spain to Antwerp, Belgium. She was refloated and taken in to Spithead, Hampshire, United Kingdom.
Vanadis	United Kingdom	The steam yacht put in to Harwich, Essex on fire. She was on a voyage from the River Tyne to the River Thames.
Water Lily	United Kingdom	The barque was wrecked in the "Darwarkan Islands", Netherlands East Indies. Her crew were rescued.
Young Harry	United Kingdom	The fishing smack was driven ashore and wrecked on Amrum, Germany. Her crew were rescued.

== 17 May ==
List of shipwrecks: 17 May 1880
Ship	State	Description
Meath	United Kingdom	The steamship was driven ashore and severely damaged at Hong Kong. She was on a voyage from Yokohama, Japan to Hong Kong. She was refloated and taken in to Hong Kong.
Rosario	Italy	The barque ran aground in the Weser. She was on a voyage from Bremen, Germany to Newcastle upon Tyne, Northumberland, United Kingdom. She was refloated.
Ruby	United States	The steamship was destroyed by fire while fitting out.
Sebastopol	France	The ship foundered off Saint Pauls, Nova Scotia, Canada. Her crew were rescued.
Zembra	United Kingdom	The dandy ran aground on the Kentish Knock and was abandoned. Her crew were rescued by the schooner Mary (United Kingdom).
Unnamed	Belgium	The pilot boat was run down and sunk off St. Catherine's Point, Isle of Wight, United Kingdom by the steamship Fatfield (United Kingdom) with the loss of five of the twelve people on board. Survivors were rescued by Fatfield.

== 18 May ==
List of shipwrecks: 18 May 1880
Ship	State	Description
Ann Elizabeth	United Kingdom	The ship was wrecked on the Eastern Spit, in the Opobo, Africa.
Dolphin	Western Australia	The ship was driven ashore at Rockingham.
Harry	United Kingdom	The fishing smack was driven ashore and wrecked on Amrum, Friesland, Netherlands. Her crew were rescued.
Lady Hilda	United Kingdom	The ship was damaged by fire at the Millwall Dock, London.

== 19 May ==
List of shipwrecks: 19 May 1880
Ship	State	Description
Aspotogon	Canada	The barque was driven ashore at the Richibucto Cape, New Brunswick. She was on a voyage from Pictou, Nova Scotia to Montreal, Quebec.
Belgnon	United Kingdom	The steamship sank in the Raz de Sein. Her crew were rescued.

== 20 May ==
List of shipwrecks: 20 May 1880
Ship	State	Description
Albula	United Kingdom	The steamship was driven ashore north of the Heugh Lighthouse, County Durham. She was on a voyage from South Shields, County Durham to Middlesbrough, Yorkshire. She was refloated and put back to South Shields.
Archer	United Kingdom	The schooner ran aground on the Doom Bar. She was on a voyage from the Shetland Islands to Padstow, Cornwall. She was refloated and taken in to Padstow in a leaky condition.
Catherine	United Kingdom	The schooner ran aground in the Larne Lough. She was on a voyage from Glasgow, Renfrewshire to Dublin.
Guardian	United States	The ship ran aground on the Seco Shoal. She was refloated and taken in to Manila, Spanish East Indies.
Jane Smith	United Kingdom	The schooner ran aground on the Platters, in the North Sea off the coast of Essex.
Tromsø	Norway	The brig was driven ashore at Stubben, Germany. She was on a voyage from Newcastle upon Tyne, Northumberland, United Kingdom to Umeå, Sweden. She was refloated.

== 21 May ==
List of shipwrecks: 21 May 1880
Ship	State	Description
Francis Drake	United Kingdom	The brigantine was driven ashore and wrecked at Vestervik, Sweden. She was on a voyage from Trinidad to Turku, Grand Duchy of Finland.
Harken Cornelia	Netherlands	The barque capsized in the Baltic Sea. She was towed in to "Draco" by the schooner Neptun (Russia).

== 22 May ==
List of shipwrecks: 22 May 1880
Ship	State	Description
Anna	New Zealand	The ketch was wrecked near Bluff. Both men on board perished.
Canton	United Kingdom	The ship was damaged by fire in the South West India Dock, London.
Maine	United States	The steamship was destroyed by fire at Port Huron, Michigan.

== 23 May ==
List of shipwrecks: 23 May 1880
Ship	State	Description
Bon Accord	United Kingdom	The tug sank in the River Wear.
Boraco	Flag unknown	The ship was wrecked on a reef 60 nautical miles (110 km) from Halifax, Nova Scotia, Canada. Her crew survived. She was on a voyage from New Orleans, Louisiana, United States to Trieste.
Fanny Thornton	New Zealand	The ketch drifted onto rocks and was wrecked near the entrance to Hokianga Harbour when the wind suddenly abated.

== 24 May ==
List of shipwrecks: 24 May 1880
Ship	State	Description
Caroline	United Kingdom	The schooner ran aground at Copenhagen, Denmark. She was on a voyage from Swansea, Glamorgan to Saint Petersburg, Russia. She was refloated.
Kildonan	Canada	The brigantine was abandoned in the Atlantic Ocean 600 nautical miles (1,100 km) west of Cape Clear Island, Nova Scotia. Her crew were rescued by the steamship Helvetia (United Kingdom). Kildonan was on a voyage from Barrow-in-Furness, Lancashire, United Kingdom to New York, United States.

== 25 May ==
List of shipwrecks: 25 May 1880
Ship	State	Description
Amsterdam	Netherlands	The steamship ran aground at Maassluis, South Holland. She was on a voyage from Gothenburg, Sweden to Rotterdam, South Holland. She was refloated with assistance the next day.
Janequeo	Chilean Navy	War of the Pacific: The torpedo boat was sunk off Callao, Peru.
William W. Thomas	United Kingdom	The ship was wrecked on the Hogsty Reef. She was on a voyage from Liverpool, Lancashire to Matanzas, Cuba.

== 26 May ==
List of shipwrecks: 26 May 1880
Ship	State	Description
Arvon	United Kingdom	The schooner was driven ashore at Ballyness, County Donegal.
Galatea	United Kingdom	The steamship ran aground at Bushire, Persia. She was refloated on 28 May.
Janne	France	The schooner ran aground on the Barre-á-Anglais. She was refloated and resumed her voyage.
Spell	United Kingdom	The fishing smack foundered off Rockall with the loss of all fourteen hands.
Strathairly	United Kingdom	The steamship ran aground at Belfast, County Antrim. She was on a voyage from Belfast to Glasgow, Renfrewshire. She was refloated and resumed her voyage.
Unnamed	Flag unknown	The schooner was driven ashore at the Pointe de la Coubre, Charente-Inférieure, France. Her crew were rescued.

== 28 May ==
List of shipwrecks: 28 May 1880
Ship	State	Description
Henry Bolchow	United Kingdom	The steamship ran aground at Lingah, Persia. She was on a voyage from Bombay, India to Bushire, Persia. She was refloated and resumed her voyage.

== 30 May ==
List of shipwrecks: 30 May 1880
Ship	State	Description
Edmonton	United Kingdom	The steamship was wrecked in the Providence Channel. Her 40 crew were rescued. She was on a voyage from Cardiff, Glamorgan to Havana, Cuba. Edmonton was discovered in a derelict condition 100 nautical miles (190 km) north of Key West, Florida, United States on 15 June by the steamship Deronda (United Kingdom), which put a skeleton crew aboard with the intention of taking her in to Key West.
Quickstep	United Kingdom	The tug ran aground on the Elbow End Bank, at the mouth of the River Tay. She was on a voyage from Montrose to Dundee, Forfarshire. Sixteen of her passengers were taken off by the tug Excelsior (United Kingdom) and by boats. Quickstep was refloated and put back to Montrose.

== 31 May ==
List of shipwrecks: 31 May 1879
Ship	State	Description
Angelique	France	The ship ran aground in the Saigon River. She was on a voyage from Saigon, French Indo-China to Saint Helena. She was refloated and resumed her voyage.
Duchess of Lancaster	United Kingdom	The barque ran aground on the Weymouth Reef, off Antigua. She was on a voyage from Trinidad to Queenstown, County Cork. She was refloated with assistance and taken in to Antigua.
Unnamed	Belgium	The fishing smack foundered in the North Sea 12 nautical miles (22 km) east of Montrose, Forfarshire, United Kingdom. Her crew were rescued by the fishing boat Welfare (United Kingdom).

== Unknown date ==
List of shipwrecks: Unknown date in May 1879
Ship	State	Description
Advance	New Zealand	The schooner drifted onto the North Spit at Christchurch and was damaged. She was refloated.
Aldergrove	United Kingdom	The ship ran aground at Adelaide, South Australia. She was on a voyage from London to Adelaide. She was refloated.
Alma	United Kingdom	The ship ran aground at "Amazea", Denmark. She was on a voyage from Newcastle upon Tyne, Northumberland to a Baltic port. She was refloated and resumed her voyage.
Aner	Sweden	The barque was driven ashore on Læsø, Denmark before 27 May. She was refloated and taken in to Fredrikshavn, Denmark.
Anna	Germany	The schooner was driven ashore on Hiiumaa, Russia.
Annie	United Kingdom	The steamship collided with the steamship Memento (Norway) and was beached at Bath, Zeeland, Netherlands. Annie was on a voyage from Antwerp, Belgium to Goole, Yorkshire. She was refloated with assistance from the tug England (Flag unknown) and put back to Antwerp severely hogged on her starboard side.
Ann Law	United Kingdom	The ship was severely damaged by fire at Sunderland, County Durham.
Bachelors	United States	The ship ran aground in the Seine. She was on a voyage from New Orleans, Louisiana to Rouen, Seine-Inférieure, France.
Bellona	Norway	The barque was driven ashore and wrecked at Musquash, New Brunswick, Canada.
Berlin	Germany	The steamship ran aground on the Middle Sand, in the River Ouse near Goole. She was on a voyage from Hamburg to Goole.
Blanche	United Kingdom	The schooner sank near "Belour", France. Her crew survived. She was on a voyage from Hamburg to Nantes, Loire-Inférieure, France.
Borneo	United States	The full-rigged ship was driven ashore and wrecked on Beaver Island, Nova Scotia, Canada. She was on a voyage from New Orleans to Trieste.
Calais-Douvres	United Kingdom	The steamship sprang a leak and sank at Dover, Kent. She was refloated and towed to London by the tugs Granville and Palmerston (United Kingdom) and was placed under repair.
Care	United Kingdom	The abandoned smack was driven ashore at Thorpeness, Suffolk. She was refloated and take in to Harwich, Essex by a pilot cutter.
Carl Johan	Sweden	The barque was driven ashore at "Carlso", Gotland. She was refloated and towed in to Visby.
Caroline	Sweden	The barque was driven ashore on Saltholmen, Denmark.
Caroline	Norway	The barque ran aground on the Hinder Bank, in the North Sea off the Dutch coast. She was refloated with assistance.
Ceres	United Kingdom	The brig struck a rock and was wrecked. Her crew were rescued. She was on a voyage from Newcastle upon Tyne to Rotterdam, South Holland, Netherlands.
C. E. Robinson	United Kingdom	The barque was driven ashore at "Manawogonish". She was on a voyage from Saint John, New Brunswick to Honfleur. She was refloated and put back to Saint John.
Connaught	United Kingdom	The ship ran aground at Chittagong, India. She was on a voyage from Chittagong to Mauritius. She was refloated and resumed her voyage.
Corragio	Italy	The barque foundered at sea. Her crew survived.
Critic	United Kingdom	The smack collided with the smack British Queen (United Kingdom) and sank. Her crew survived.
Daniel Marin	Italy	The barque foundered at sea. Her crew were rescued. She was on a voyage from Java, Netherlands East Indies to the English Channel.
David Malcolmson	United Kingdom	The barque was driven ashore and wrecked at Cape Negro, Nova Scotia. Her crew were rescued. She was on a voyage from Liverpool, Lancashire to Saint John, New Brunswick
Diana	Norway	The brig was abandoned in the Atlantic Ocean before 15 May. She was discovered on that date at 48°57′N 21°52′W by the steamship Queen (United Kingdom), which put some of her crew aboard. They took her in to Queenstown, County Cork, United Kingdom in a leaky condition.
Elizabeth Ann	United Kingdom	The ship was damaged by fire at Glenarm, County Antrim. She was on a voyage from Glenarm to Campbeltown, Argyllshire.
Ellida	United Kingdom	The ship ran aground at "Amazea", Denmark. She was on a voyage from Sunderland, County Durham to a Baltic port. She was refloated and resumed her voyage.
Esmeralda, and Holland	United Kingdom; Sweden	Esmeralda collided with the steamship Holland at Lübeck, Germany and sank. She was on a voyage from Alloa, Clackmannanshire to Saint Petersburg, Russia. Holland was severely damaged. She put back to Lübeck.
Expectance	United Kingdom	The ship struck an iceberg and sank in the Baltic Sea off Skutskär, Sweden on or before 10 May. Her crew were rescued. She was on a voyage from Sunderland, County Durham to Saint Petersburg.
Falcon	United Kingdom	The steamship was damaged by fire at Antwerp, Belgium.
Fides	United Kingdom	The brig ran aground in the Bokkegat. She was on a voyage from Newcastle upon Tyne to Rotterdam. She was refloated and towed in to Hellevoetsluis, Zeeland, Netherlands in a leaky condition.
Gauthiod	Sweden	The ship was wrecked on the Colorados, off the coast of Cuba. Her crew were rescued. She was on a voyage from New Orleans to Dunkirk, Nord, France.
Grace Kelly	United States	The brig was wrecked at Anamaboe, Gold Coast. She was on a voyage from the Cape Coast Castle to Anamaboe.
Guiver	United Kingdom	The brigantine was wrecked at Barranquilla, United States of Colombia.
Gudrun	Norway	The barque was damaged by ice and abandoned in the Atlantic Ocean. Her crew survived. She was on a voyage from Dram to Miramichi, New Brunswick.
Hamburg	Germany	The barque was driven ashore on Pratas Island, Formosa before 8 May. She was refloated and put back to Hong Kong in a leaky condition.
Henry Trowbridge	United States	The schooner ran aground at Montevideo, Uruguay and was severely damaged.
HMS Iron Duke	Royal Navy	The Audacious-class ironclad ran aground in the Huangpu River. She was refloated five days later with assistance from USS Monocacy (United States Navy).
James Gray	United Kingdom	The steamship was driven ashore at "False Cape", near Baltimore, Maryland, United States. She was on a voyage from Béni Saf, Algeria to Baltimore. She was refloated and completed her voyage.
Jeanie Landles	United States	The ship ran aground in the Hooghly River. She was on a voyage from Calcutta, India to New York. She was refloated and resumed her voyage.
Jessie Boyle	United Kingdom	The barque was wrecked near Cape San Antonio, Cuba. Her crew were rescued. She was on a voyage from Newport, Monmouthshire to Pensacola, Florida, United States.
J. S. Wright	United Kingdom	The ship was abandoned at sea. Her crew were rescued. She was on a voyage from Gloucester to Providence, New Jersey, United States.
Julie	Sweden	The schooner was driven ashore on Saltholmen.
Lloyd	United Kingdom	The ship ran aground on the Sunderland Bank, in the Irish Sea off the coast of Lancashire. She was refloated.
Lochawe	United Kingdom	The ship ran aground at San Juan, Puerto Rico and sprang a leak.
Lydia	United Kingdom	The ship was driven ashore at "Betsiametis", Quebec, Canada. She was later refloated and taken in to Quebec City in a severely damaged condition.
Mallard	United Kingdom	The ship ran aground at Miramichi. She was on a voyage from London to Quebec City.
Mette	Denmark	The brigantine was abandoned in the Atlantic Ocean. Her crew were rescued by Europa (Flag unknown).
Morning Star	United Kingdom	The ship was sunk by ice off Cape Ray, Newfoundland Colony (46°39′N 59°40′W). Her seven crew were rescued by the barque Princess Royal (United Kingdom). Morning Star was on a voyage from Liverpool to Quebec City.
Najaden	Flag unknown	The ship ran aground on Saltholmen. She was refloated and take in to Malmö, Sweden for repairs.
Offley	Tasmania	The whaler, a barque, was wrecked at Hobart before 14 May.
Oma	Norway	The brig was driven ashore at Aracaju, Brazil.
Our Annie	United Kingdom	The ship was driven ashore on Green Island, Nova Scotia. She was on a voyage from Barbados to Quebec City. She was consequently condemned. Our Annie was refloated in June and completed her voyage.
Peiho	France	The steamship parted from her moorings in a squall at Shanghai, China. She collided with the frigate Thémis (French Navy) and was damaged. Repaired and returned to service.
Persian	United Kingdom	The steamship was driven ashore at Boston, Massachusetts, United States.
Prince of Wales	United Kingdom	The ship was beached at Egmond aan Zee, North Holland, Netherlands and was wrecked.
Quiver	United Kingdom	The brigantine was wrecked at Barranquilla, United States of Colombia. Her crew were rescued.
Robert A. Chapman	United Kingdom	The barque was driven ashore on the French coast. She was later refloated and take in to Calais.
Sarah B	United States	The schooner was abandoned in the Atlantic Ocean before 4 May.
Schiedam	Netherlands	The steamship ran aground at Maassluis, South Holland. She was on a voyage from Rotterdam, South Holland to New York. She was refloated and resumed her voyage.
Stella	Netherlands	The steamship ran aground in the Danube 37 nautical miles (69 km) downstream of Sulina, United Principalities. She was refloated three days later and taken in to Sulina.
Strathisla	United Kingdom	The schooner was abandoned in the North Sea before 17 May. Her crew were rescued by the steamship Xantha (United Kingdom). Strathisla was on a voyage from Hull, Yorkshire to Lyme Regis, Dorset. Strathisla was subsequently taken in to Great Yarmouth, Norfolk.
Trafalgar	United Kingdom	The ship was severely damaged by fire at Gävle, Sweden.
HMS Wolverine	Royal Navy	The Jason-class corvette ran aground in the River Tamar in late May. She was refloated.
Zebulon	Austria-Hungary	The barque ran aground off Honfleur, Manche, France. She was on a voyage from New York to Honfleur. She was refloated on 26 May and towed in to Honfleur.
Four unnamed vessels	Tasmania	The coasters were wrecked at Hobart before 12 May.
Unnamed	Greece	The ship was driven ashore at "Sdefkia". Her crew were rescued.
