= Manuel Ferreyros =

Peruvian Navy officer, diplomat and politician (1833–1876)

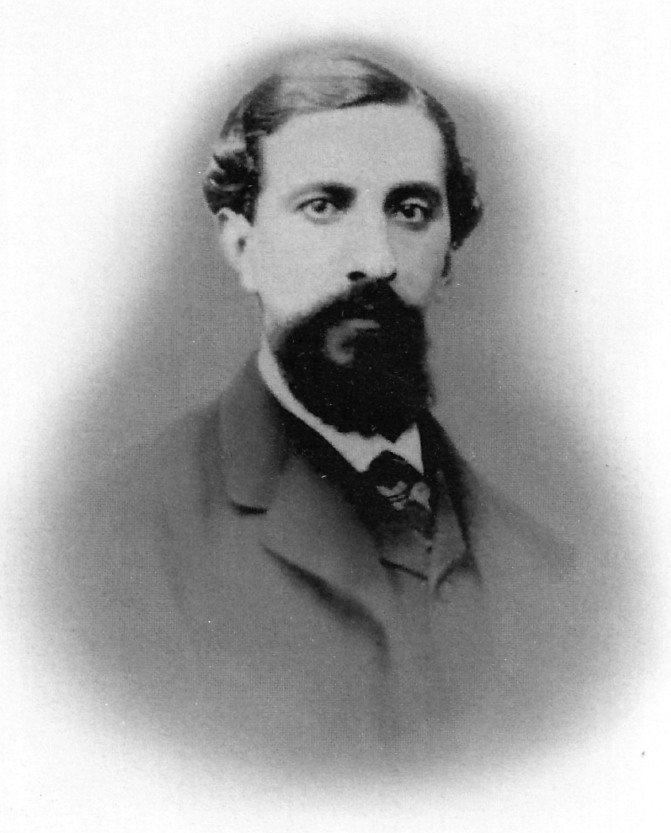

Minister of Government, Police and Public Works
- In office April 13, 1869 – July 27, 1869
- Preceded by: Pedro Gálvez
- Succeeded by: Rafael Velarde

Personal details
- Born: September 2, 1833 Lima, Peru
- Died: January 13, 1876 (aged 42) Puno, Peru

Military service
- Allegiance: Peru
- Branch: Peruvian Navy
- Years of service: 1854–1874
- Rank: Captain
- Battles/wars: Liberal Revolution (1854) Peruvian Civil War of 1856–1858 (WIA); Ecuadorian–Peruvian War; Chincha Islands War: Battle of Abtao

Manuel José Ferreyros y Senra (September 2, 1833 — January 13, 1876) was a Peruvian Navy officer, diplomat and politician. Ferreyros was a friend and comrade-in-arms of Miguel Grau, Aurelio García y García and Lizardo Montero Flores, who were known as the "Four Aces of the Peruvian Navy". Unlike his comrades-in-arms, Ferreyros did not participate in the War of the Pacific, as he died prematurely, three years before the conflict broke out. His younger brother, Captain Carlos Ferreyros, fought in the war, commanding the gunboat Pilcomayo.

== Biography ==
Ferreyros was born in Lima to Manuel Bartolomé Ferreyros, politician and diplomat, and María Josefa Basilia Senra y Echevarría. He entered the navy in 1853 as a midshipman. That same year he embarked on the French frigate La Forte, on board of which he made several trips between the Oceanian archipelagos.

Upon his return to Peru in 1854, he took part in the capture of Arica and then went on to serve aboard the brig Almirante Guise, rising to alférez de fragata. During the civil war of 1854 he remained loyal to the government of José Rufino Echenique. In December of the same year, he went to the frigate Amazonas. After the battle of La Palma on January 5, 1855, which put an end to both the war and Echenique's government, he was discharged from the navy, although shortly after he was readmitted, and re-embarked in the Amazonas.

In 1856 he was promoted to second lieutenant and went to the frigate Apurímac, where he remained until the uprising of that ship in Arica, in November of that year. The rebellious sailors, including Miguel Grau and Lizardo Montero Flores, joined Manuel Ignacio de Vivanco's revolution against the government of Ramón Castilla, the same one that led to a new civil war in 1856. Ferreyros, who did not want to join the revolution, returned to Callao, being assigned to the steamship Ucayali, later passing to the subtle forces that defended the port under the command of Guillermo Jones. Callao was attacked by the rebel navy, and he was wounded in the combat of April 22, 1857. Shortly before, Ferreyros had been promoted to graduate senior lieutenant. In June 1857 he was promoted to effective first lieutenant.

In September 1857 he was sent in commission to Panama and later to Rio de Janeiro, accompanying Rear Admiral Ignacio Mariátegui y Tellería, to meet the frigate Amazonas, which was returning from its trip around the world. He went to that ship as second commander and participated in the blockade of the Ecuadorian coast in 1859, during the Peruvian-Ecuadorian War. He was promoted to lieutenant commander effective in October 1859.

In 1860, he traveled to England as a member of the commission in charge of supervising the construction of the steamers destined to serve in the Peruvian Amazon. On board one of those steamers, the Morona, in 1862 he starred in an incident with the Brazilian authorities at Fort Ovidos, in the Brazilian Amazon, who tried to prevent him from passing on his trip to Loreto. This episode originated a phrase that became popular in colloquial speech: "as brave as Ferreyros" (Spanish: Bravo como Ferreyros). He then assumed command of the Loreto post. By then he was an effective frigate captain (1862).

In 1864 he returned to Callao and was in charge of the rescue of the Callao frigate (formerly Apurímac), which had sunk on the island of San Lorenzo during a test of the floating dock. In 1864 and 1865 he was commander of the steamer Loa.

In 1866 he participated in the Chincha Islands War, commanding the corvette América. He stood out in the Battle of Abtao, where the allied Peruvian-Chilean fleet faced the Spanish screw frigates Villa de Madrid and Reina Blanca on February 7, 1866. His ship made "the most accurate shots, with the longest range and most effect," as the head of the Spanish squadron himself pointed out in the respective part.

When the dictatorship of Mariano Ignacio Prado decided to continue the war against Spain, attacking its possessions in Cuba and the Philippines, hiring the American Commodore John R. Tucker as commander of the Peruvian navy, the protest of the Peruvian sailors was immediate, in solidarity with the displaced chief, Lizardo Montero. A large number of officers resigned in protest, including Ferreyros and Grau. The government considered this attitude as insubordination and imprisoned the rebel sailors on the island of San Lorenzo, putting them on trial. One by one they were declared innocent and released (1867). He then requested indefinite leave in the Navy and became commander of the merchant frigate America, in which he made trips to China.

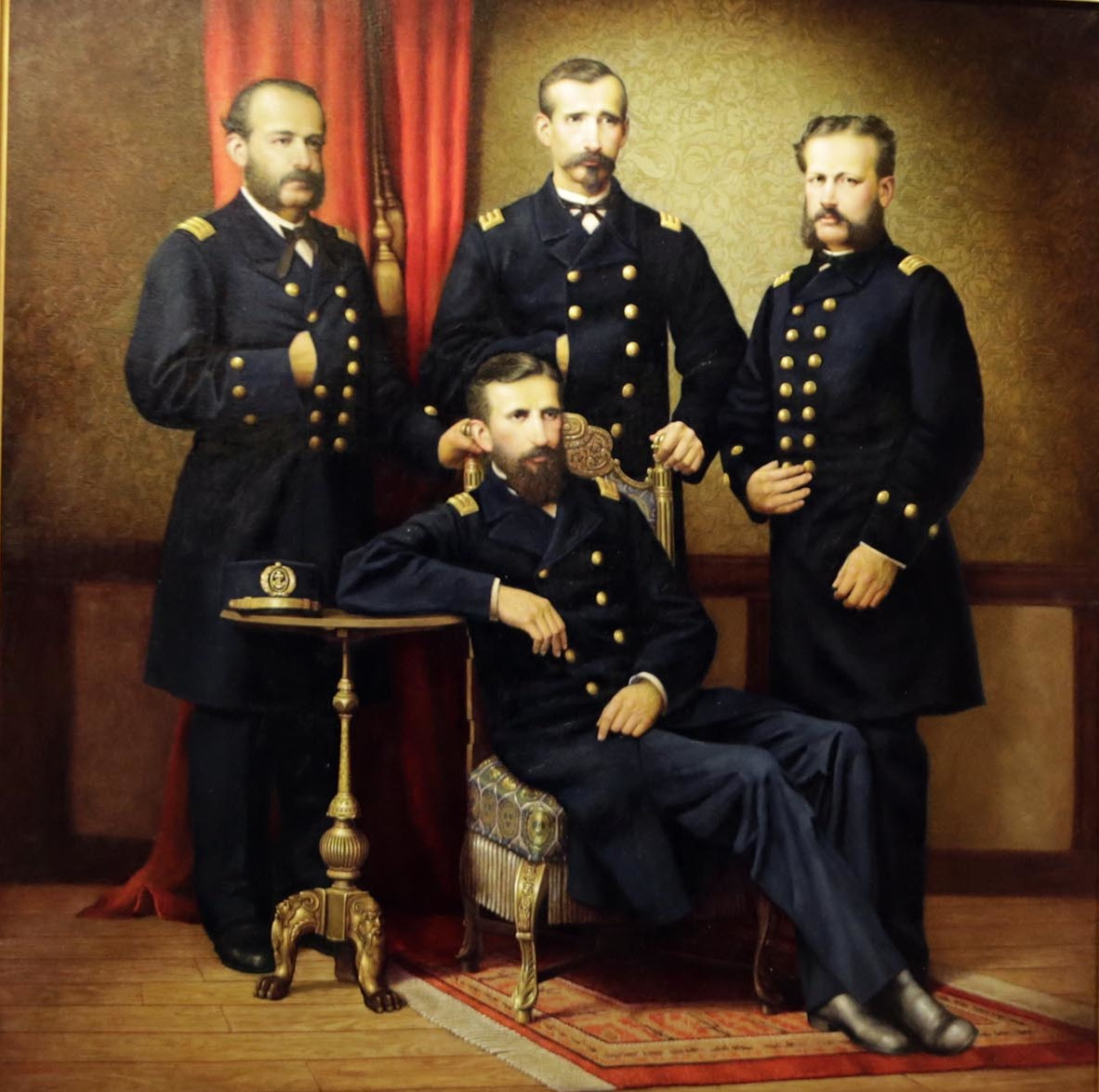
The Four Aces of the Peruvian Navy. Standing, from left to right, Miguel Grau, Lizardo Montero and Aurelio García y García. Seated: Manuel Ferreyros.

Together with Lizardo Montero, Ferreyros was godfather at Grau's marriage to Dolores Cabero, while Aurelio García y García officiated as witness (April 12, 1867). The four sailors used to be seen together frequently, which is why they were known in the naval circles as the "four aces".

In January 1869 he was promoted to graduate sea captain. From April to July of the same year he was Minister of Government, Police and Public Works, forming part of the cabinet of Juan Francisco Balta, of the government of José Balta. In July 1869 he left Callao aboard the corvette Union, bound for Rio de Janeiro, to take charge of the naval division that brought the monitors Manco Cápac and Atahualpa from the United States in tow. Returning to Callao, he was named General Commander of the Peruvian Navy on December 4, 1870.

At the beginning of 1872, President Balta, authorized by Congress, sent ship captain Manuel Ferreyros to Europe as head of the commission in charge of managing the construction of two armored ships and two gunboats. This was intended to counterbalance the naval power of Chile, which had already contracted the construction of two powerful armored ships, the Cochrane and the Blanco Encalada. Unfortunately for the Peruvian interest, the fall and death of Balta interrupted the efforts of Ferreyros and although it is true that they were resumed later when Manuel Pardo was president, the same interest was not shown, due to the economic crisis that the nation was going through. In 1874, a Commission of sailors was appointed to issue a comparative report of the Peruvian and Chilean squadrons, opining that the Peruvian squadron could resist the Chilean squadron despite its superiority, with the dissenting voices of the naval chiefs Miguel Grau and José Rosendo Careño who argued that this contract should be carried out, whatever the cost. It was only possible to acquire the two gunboats, which were the Pilcomayo and the Chanchamayo (the latter was lost shortly after, when it was shipwrecked in Falsa Punta Aguja, in 1876).

In 1874 he was issued a retirement certificate for health reasons. Victim of a stroke, he died prematurely in 1876, when he was barely 43 years old. For this reason, he did not participate in the War of the Pacific, unlike his comrades-in-arms.

== Family ==
He was married to María Amalia Alayza y Portillo with whom he had three daughters: Elena, María and Manuela.

He had two brothers who also stood out in the Navy: Carlos Ferreyros y Senra (1843–1910), who stood out during the naval campaign of the War of the Pacific, serving aboard the Pilcomayo gunboat; and Eusebio Demetrio Ferreyros y Senra (1847–1868), who served on board the corvette América, later dying in the Arica tsunami of 1868.

== See also ==
- Miguel Grau
- Lizardo Montero
- Aurelio García y García

== Bibliography ==
- Arosemena Garland, Geraldo (1975). El Almirante Miguel Grau (6th ed.). Tipografía y Offset Peruana S.A. pp. XII, 25, 41, 42, 46, 51, 52, 68, 69, 70–76, 86, 87 and 278.
- Basadre, Jorge (1998). Historia de la República del Perú, 1822–1933. Tomo I (8th ed.). La República.
- Castañeda Martos, Alicia (1991). Viaje de los Monitores Manco Cápac y Atahualpa desde el Atlántico al Pacífico 1868 – 1870. Fondo de Publicaciones Dirección General de Intereses Marítimos / Talleres Gráficos de CESY GRAF S.A.
- Congrains Martín, Eduardo (1972). Miguel Grau, el león del Pacífico. Editorial ECOMA S.A.
- Luna Vegas, Emilio (2019). Perú y Chile en cinco siglos. Hildebrandt en sus trece.
- Ortiz Sotelo, Jorge; Castañeda Martos, Alicia (2007). Diccionario Biográfico Marítimo Peruano. Asociación de Historia Marítima y Naval Iberoamericana / Jhire Grafel S.R.L. ISBN 978-9972-877-06-3.
- Ortiz de Zevallos Paz Soldán, Carlos (1958). Negociación Ferreyros - Olañeta. Ministerio de Relaciones Exteriores del Perú / Imprenta Colegio Militar Leoncio Prado.
- Vegas García, Manuel I. (2014). Historia de la Marina de Guerra del Perú 1821 – 1924 (3rd ed.). Instituto de Estudios Histórico-Marítimos del Perú. pp. 155, 156, 169, 173, 340, 341.
