= Luis Castillo Goñi =

Chilean vice admiral (1858–1928)

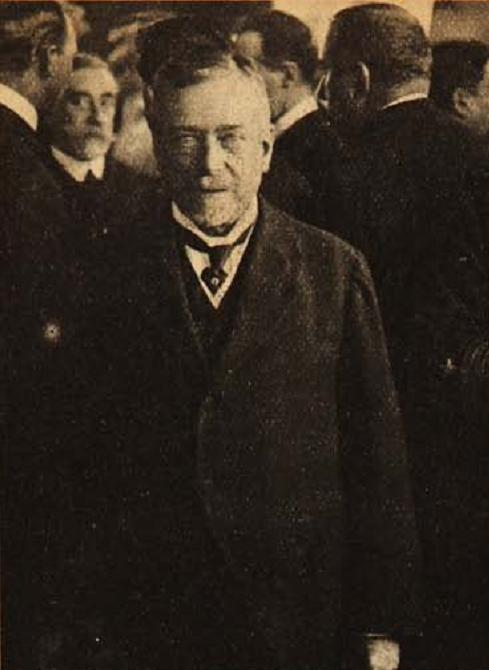
- Born: August 12, 1844; Santiago, Santiago Province, Chile
- Died: November 9, 1928 (aged 84); Santiago, Santiago Province, Chile
- Military career
- Allegiance: Conservative Republic; Liberal Republic
- Branch: Chilean Navy
- Service years: 1858 – 1907
- Rank: Vice Admiral
- Conflicts: War of the Pacific: Naval campaign of the War of the Pacific; Battle of Angamos; Capture of the corvette Pilcomayo; Lima campaign; Battle of San Juan and Chorrillos; Battle of Miraflores
- Awards: Grand Cross of the Cross of Naval Merit

Luis Anacleto Castillo Goñi (1844-1928) was a Chilean vice admiral who was a participant of the War of the Pacific. During the war, he was a commander of the Blanco Encalada, participating in numerous battles throughout the Naval campaign of the War of the Pacific and going on to serve an extensive military career after the war.

== Early life ==
At the age of 14, in 1858, he entered the Arturo Prat Naval School at Valparaíso. The members of this course, made up of 26 cadets plus 2 supernumeraries, graduated on November 15, 1861, as midshipmen. Later it was named the "Course of Heroes", since among them were the greatest heroes of the Chilean Navy such as Arturo Prat, Juan José Latorre, Carlos Condell and others. During his first years in the Chilean Navy, he participated in various hydrographic commissions in the southern region of Chile. In 1862, he was aboard the steamer Maule on the Biobío River, in 1867 on the steamer Ancud, and in 1870 on the schooner Virgen de Covadonga. In 1864, he was sent to the United Kingdom to inspect the construction of the O'Higgins and Chacabuco corvettes and in 1872, he was sent again to supervise the construction in England of the Blanco Encalada and Almirante Cochrane ironclads.

== War of the Pacific ==
Being a corvette captain, in 1879 he was appointed Major of Orders of the Commander in Chief of the Squadron, the ship's captain Galvarino Riveros. In the Battle of Angamos, after the surrender of the ironclad Huáscar, he was sent to command one of the boats of the ironclad Blanco Encalada that occupied the ship. After the battle, he was promoted to frigate captain and made commander of the Blanco Encalada. On November 21, 1879, under the command of Blanco Encalada, participated in the Capture of the corvette Pilcomayo. On September 22, 1880, he had the mission to bombard the Peruvian port of Ancón. He later participated in the battles of San Juan and Miraflores.

== Final years ==
Now a frigate captain, on May 7, 1881, he was appointed director of the Naval School, a position he held until March 20, 1885. In 1887, he was part of the mission that supervised the construction of ships and the repairs of the Almirante Cochrane in the English shipyards. At the end of the Chilean Civil War of 1891, Rear Admiral Castillo was appointed Undersecretary of the Navy. In 1892 he served as commander in chief of the squad. Between the years 1893 and 1897, he was appointed Mayor of Valparaíso and Commander General of the Navy. On March 28, 1902, he was appointed director of the Naval School for the second time, a post he held until March 22, 1907, due to his retirement. He died in 1928.
