= Ferreyros =

Peruvian conglomerate

Ferreycorp
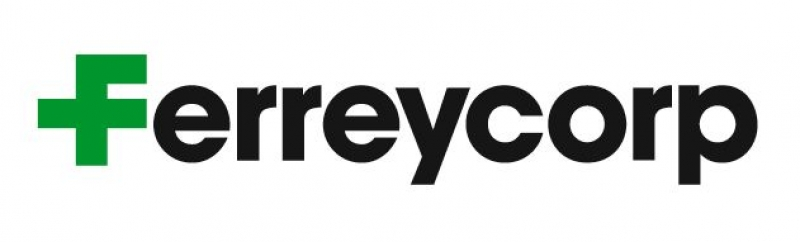
- Company type: Public holding company
- Traded as: BVL: FERREYC1
- Industry: Heavy equipment
- Founded: (1922)
- Headquarters: Lima, Peru
- Key people: Oscar Espinosa Bedoya (Chairman); Mariela García de Fabbri (CEO)
- Products: Automotive; Machinery; Construction; Mining services
- Revenue: ▲US$ 788.6 Million (2008)
- Number of employees: 3,588
- Website: www.ferreyros.com.pe

Ferreycorp is a Peruvian conglomerate engaged in the import, distribution, sale, leasing, and maintenance of construction, mining, agricultural, and transport equipment, vehicles, and machinery. It deals with brands such as Caterpillar, Iveco, Yutong, Massey Ferguson, Terex, and many others.

The company was founded in 1922 as "Enrique Ferreyros y Cia Sociedad en Comandita" by Enrique Ferreyros Ayulo and a small group of partners. Twenty years later, the company began representing other brands in Peru, starting with Caterpillar.

In 1981, it was transformed into a corporation as part of modernization efforts. In 1998, the company underwent a new corporate restructuring and opened its capital on the Lima Stock Exchange.

Ferreycorp was included in the investigation into the case of phantom contributions to the Fujimori political party Fuerza 2011. In December 2019, Ferreycorp's management appeared before the money laundering prosecutor's office, which is investigating the phantom contributions to Fuerza Popular.
