= Lizardo Montero Flores =

Peruvian military officer and politician

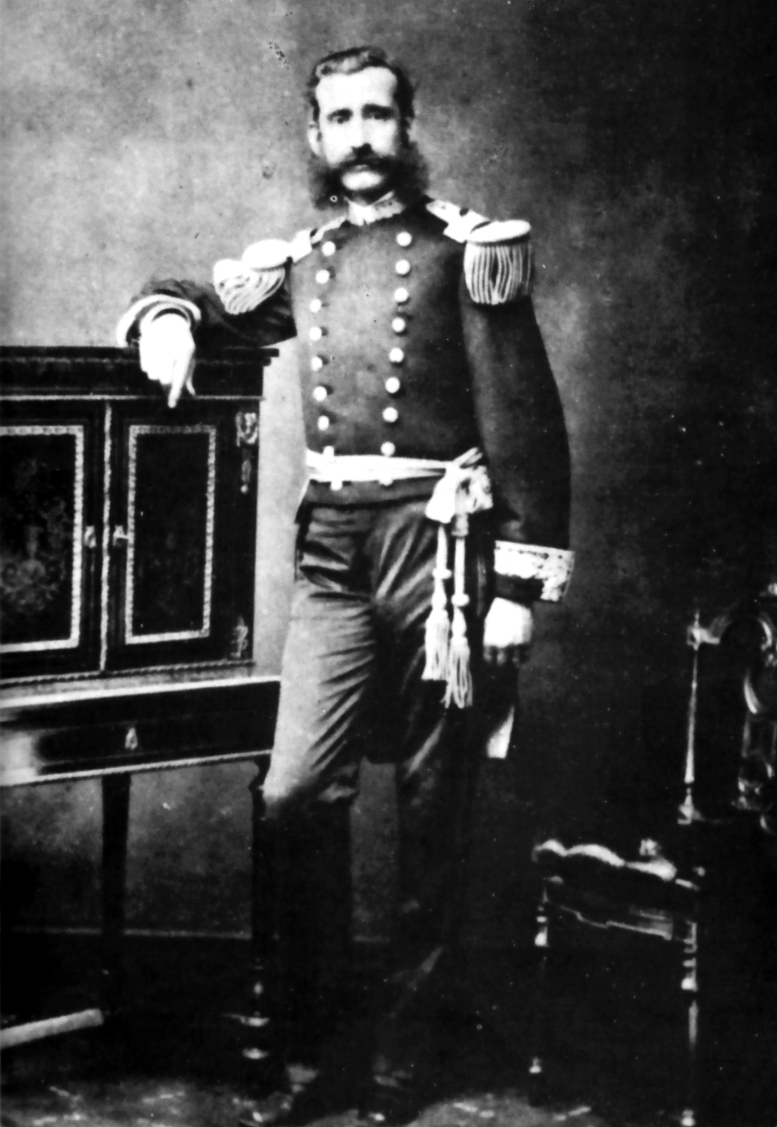

Provisional President of Peru (La Magdalena Government)
- In office November 6, 1881 – October 27, 1883
- Prime Minister: Lorenzo Iglesias Pino de Arce
- Preceded by: Francisco García Calderón
- Succeeded by: Miguel Iglesias

Personal details
- Born: May 27, 1832 Ayabaca, Peru
- Died: February 2, 1905 (aged 72) Lima, Peru
- Party: Civilista Party

Military service
- Allegiance: Peru
- Branch/service: Peruvian Navy
- Years of service: 1851–1858, 1862–1881
- Rank: Counter admiral
- Battles/wars: Peruvian Civil Wars: War of 1856–58; War of 1865; Chincha Islands War: Battle of Callao; War of the Pacific: Battle of Tacna; Battle of San Juan; Battle of Miraflores

Juan Lizardo Montero Flores (May 27, 1832 – February 2, 1905) was a Peruvian military officer and politician who held the provisional Presidency of Peru from 1881 to 1883, replacing President Francisco García Calderón, during the Chilean occupation of Peru that took place as a result of the War of the Pacific. He was also Mayor of Lima for a brief period, in 1879. Montero was a friend and comrade-in-arms of Miguel Grau, Manuel Ferreyros and Aurelio García y García, all of whom were known as the "Four Aces of the Peruvian Navy".

== Biography ==
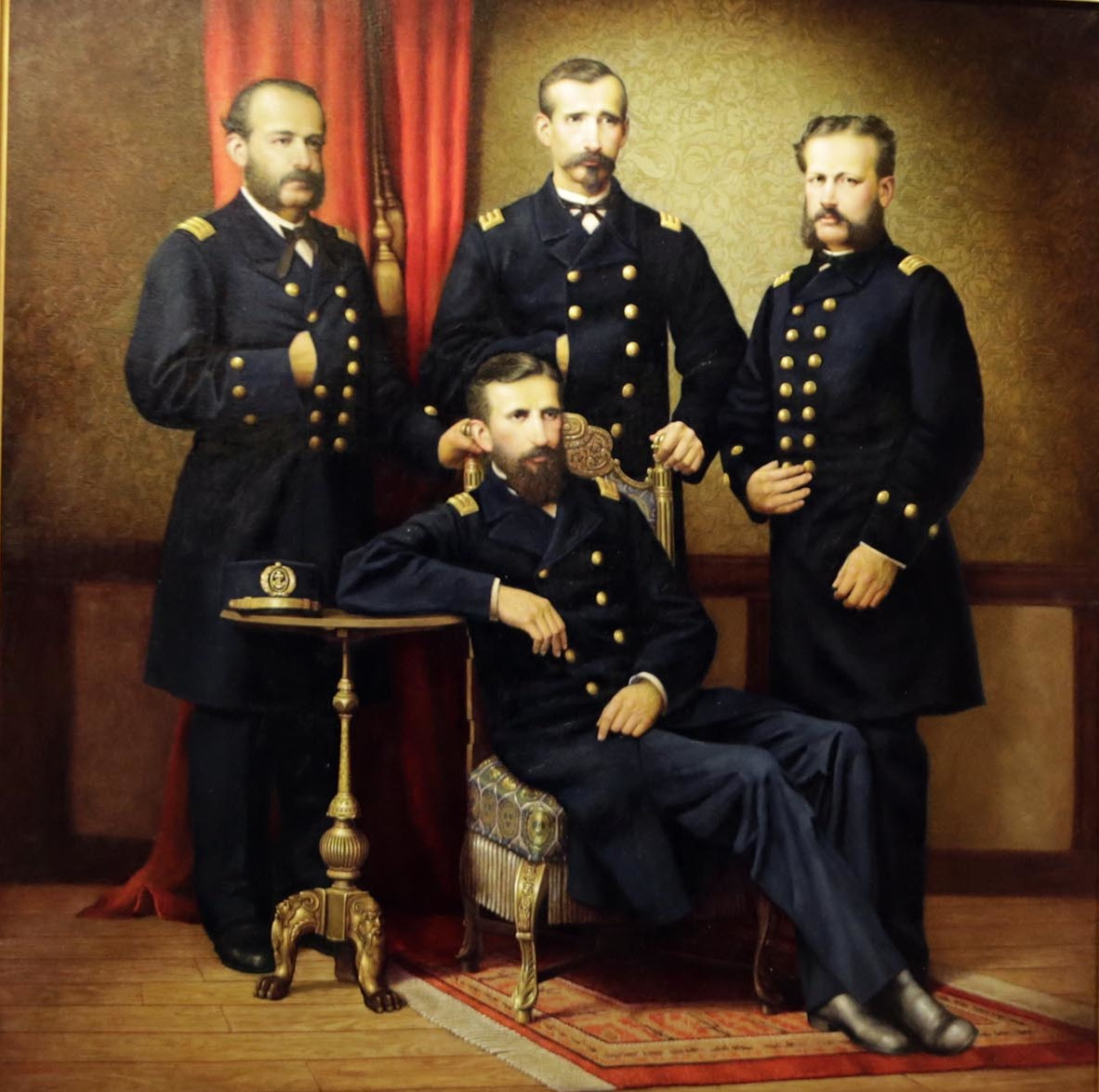
The Four Aces of the Peruvian Navy. Standing, from left to right, Miguel Grau, Lizardo Montero and Aurelio García y García. Seated: Manuel Ferreyros.

Lizardo Montero joined the Peruvian Navy in the decade of 1850. Seven years later, aboard the frigate Apurímac, he supported Manuel Ignacio de Vivanco's coup. Between 1858 and 1862 he travelled to Spain.

In 1865, he supported General Mariano Ignacio Prado in his coup d'état against General Juan Antonio Pezet. He was then promoted to the rank of corvette captain and was in command of the Peruvian squad during the conflict with Spain in 1866.

In 1871, Montero was among the founders of the Civilista Party. He was chosen senator for his native Piura and, five years later, was promoted to the rank of admiral. After Prado's declaration of war, Montero Flores was named military and political chief of the southern Peruvian provinces.

After a brief defeat in a naval campaign, he left for Lima where he joined Nicolás de Piérola's forces. He fought in the War of the Pacific during battles of San Juan and of Miraflores in January 1881. After the occupation of Lima, he left for Huaraz as military and political chief of the northern provinces. In 1881 he was chosen as Francisco García Calderón first Vice President.

After the deportation of García Calderón, Montero was named Interim President and started the peace negotiations with the government of Chile. His refusal to cede any territory to Chile forced him to briefly move the Peruvian congress to Arequipa. Montero left the country after the Treaty of Ancón in 1883. In 1890, on his return to Peru, he was once again named senator for his native Piura.

== See also ==
- List of presidents of Peru

Political offices
Preceded by Francisco García Calderón	Provisional President of the Republic of Peru; 1881	Succeeded by Andrés Avelino Cáceres
