= Aurelio García y García =

Peruvian Navy officer, diplomat and politician (1836–1888)

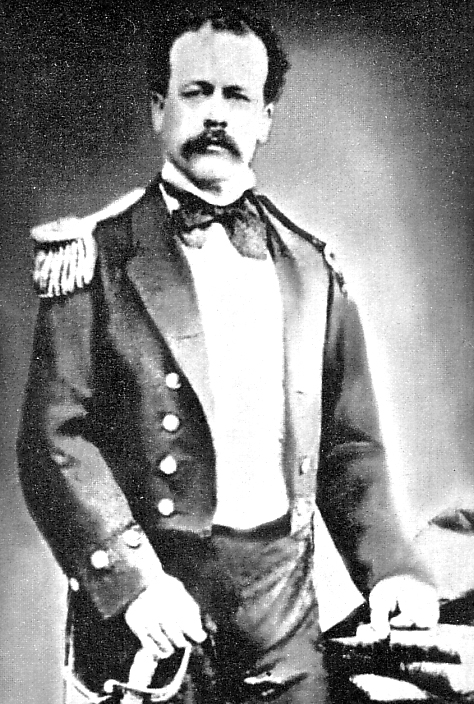

Deputy of the Republic of Peru for Tumbes
- In office July 28, 1876 – May 18, 1879
- President: Mariano Ignacio Prado
- Prime Minister: Manuel Irigoyen Larrea

Mayor of Lima
- In office 1877–1877
- Preceded by: Ignacio de Osma
- Succeeded by: Pedro José de Saavedra

Personal details
- Born: December 28, 1836 Lima, Lima Province, Peru
- Died: June 25, 1888 (aged 51) Callao, Peru
- Education: National University of San Marcos

Military service
- Allegiance: Peru
- Branch: Peruvian Navy
- Years of service: 1852 — 1888
- Rank: Contraalmirante
- Battles/wars: War of the Pacific: Battle of Chipana; Capture of the steamer Rímac

Aurelio García y García (November 28, 1836 — June 25, 1888) was a Peruvian Navy officer, diplomat and politician. García was a friend and comrade-in-arms of Miguel Grau, Manuel Ferreyros and Lizardo Montero, all of whom were known as the "Four Aces of the Peruvian Navy". He was also elected Mayor of Lima in 1877. He was also a man of wide culture, who was fully fluent in the English language and who had scientific inclinations.

== Biography ==
His parents were José Antonio de Abad Marcelo García y González and Josefa García Urrutia. He studied at the Real Convictorio de San Carlos and then went on to the Military Naval School where he graduated as a midshipman (1852). Like other sailors of his time, he served both the navy and the merchant navy.

He was promoted to ensign of a frigate in 1854 and sent to the United Kingdom to be part of the crew sent to bring the war transport Tumbes. Back in Callao, he was promoted to second lieutenant and assigned to the Ucayali steamer (1856). Shortly afterwards, he requested permission to serve in the merchant marine. He visited various Peruvian and foreign ports and compiled information for his Sailing Route off the coast of Peru, until in 1862 he returned to the navy as commander of the brig Almirante Guise, being promoted to first lieutenant.

In 1863 he became commander of the General Lerzundi steamer. At that time, the Peruvian rearmament became urgent in the face of the threatening presence of the Spanish Pacific Squadron in South American waters. In 1864, already with the rank of Lieutenant Commander, he again traveled to England, with the mission of inspecting the construction of the armored frigate Independencia.

In 1865, after being promoted to captain of a frigate, he took command of Independencia, undertaking the trip to Peru. In the port of Brest (France) he was joined by the Huáscar ironclad, commanded by José María Salcedo with whom he continued the journey in convoy. During the journey to America, a fierce rivalry was unleashed between García y García and Salcedo, which led them to the extreme ramming in the high seas and unleashing a particular confrontation between both crews. A convoy arriving from Valparaíso in June 1866, Salcedo was dismissed by order of the government and García y García learned that American sailor John Tucker had been appointed chief of the Peruvian-Chilean allied squad in the Chincha Islands War. In protest against what he considered an affront to the Peruvian officers, he therefore resigned the command of Independencia and returned to Lima. Along with other Peruvian sailors, including Miguel Grau, he was court-martialed for insubordination, but was ultimately acquitted.

In 1867 he went on to command the transport ship Chalaco. Later, he returned to the command of Independencia. In 1870 he was promoted to Captain.

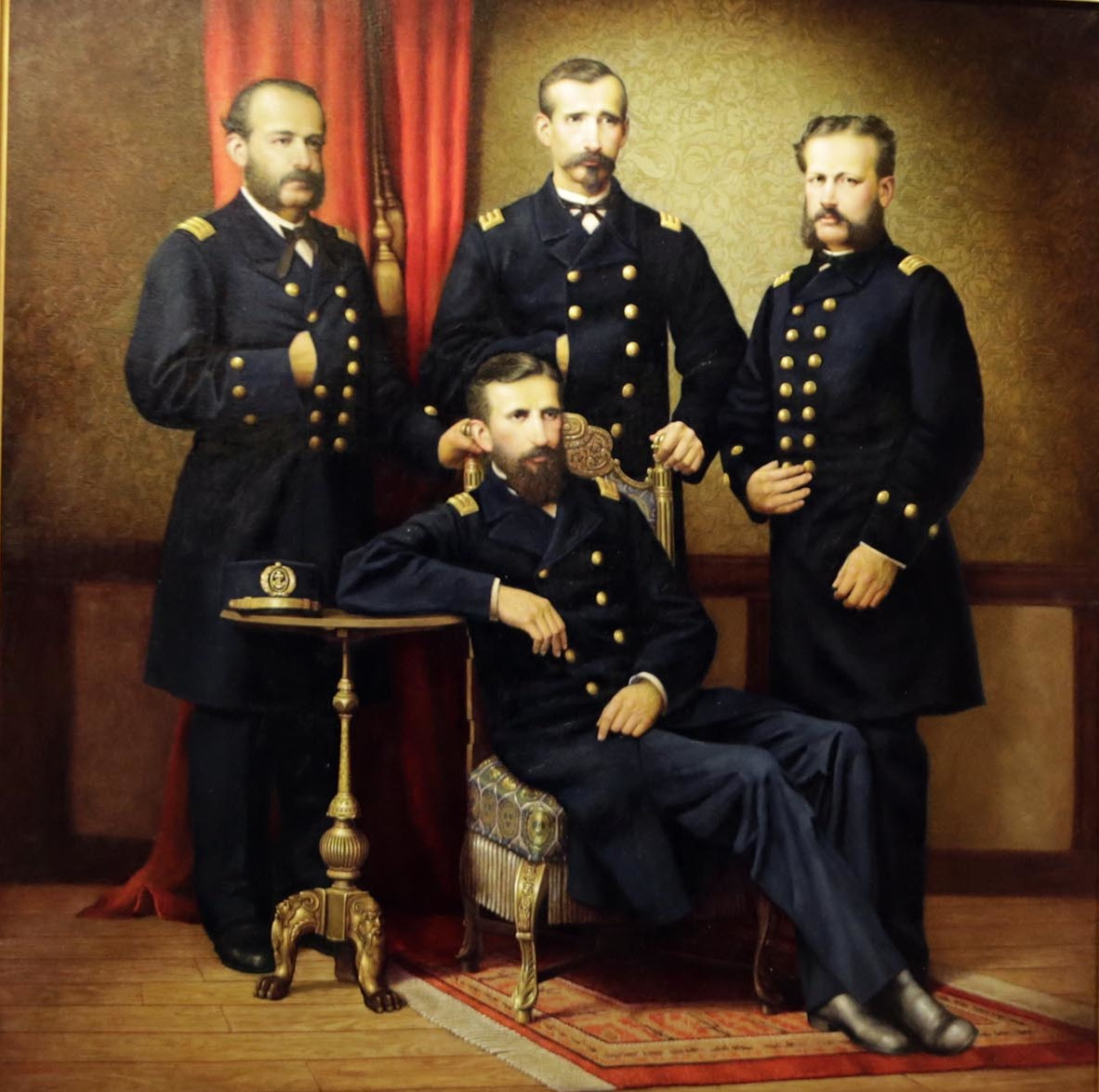
The Four Aces of the Peruvian Navy. Standing, from left to right, Miguel Grau, Lizardo Montero and Aurelio García y García. Seated: Manuel Ferreyros.

When taking place the coup d'etat of the colonels Gutiérrez in July 1872, promoted the pronouncement in defense of the legal order; the respective document, signed by the naval officers, including Miguel Grau, José Melitón Rodríguez, Carlos Ferreyros and Manuel Melitón Carvajal, says the following

The unprecedented abuse of force with which the Capital of the Republic was scandalized yesterday, had to meet, as indeed has happened, the most complete rejection on the part of the heads and officers of the Navy who subscribe, who are alien to all personal league, do not recognize any other rule of conduct than that issued or directed to the faithful compliance of the national institutions.

The squad went to sea, and on board Independencia, the elected president, Manuel Pardo y Lavalle, was transferred to Pisco, in order to safeguard it from the coup plotters.

Once peace was restored, he returned to the command of Independencia and was incorporated into the Advisory Commission of the Navy. In November 1872 he was appointed extraordinary envoy and plenipotentiary minister in the empires of Japan and China, to solve the incident caused by some coolies or Chinese workers who in Japanese port had escaped from the Maria Luz boat. He signed with the emperors of these countries treaties that established diplomatic relations between Peru, China and Japan: with Japan a treaty of peace, navigation and trade on August 21, 1873 and with China a convention to regulate the emigration of Chinese workers to Peru on June 26, 1874. This resulted in Peru becoming the second American country after the United States to establish official relations with the Empire of the Rising Sun and the Celestial Empire.

Upon his return, he was appointed Minister of Government and Public Works, a position he held from March 10, 1875 to August 2, 1876, that is, until the end of the government of Manuel Pardo. He was also mayor of Lima in 1877, deputy for the province of Tumbes piurana then between 1876 and 1878.

=== War of the Pacific ===
When the War of the Pacific broke out in 1879, he was appointed Chief of the Second Naval Division of Peru, made up of the Union corvette, the Pilcomayo gunboat and the Oroya transport. During the naval campaign he was aboard the Union and in it he participated in most of the naval combats of the war. He was thus in the first of them in the Battle of Chipana on April 12, 1879 where next to the Pilcomayo he faced the Chilean gunboat Magallanes. He then made some incursions off the Chilean coast and captured Chilean freighters such as the Adelaida Rojas and the Saucy Jack, as well as several merchant boats. And with the support of Huáscar, he cornered and captured the Chilean transport Rímac, which was carrying troops and supplies to Antofagasta on June 23, 1879. Through the official correspondence taken from Rímac, it was learned that the Chileans were waiting for a transport of arms and supplies that would come through the Strait of Magellan, so the Peruvian government entrusted Aurelio García to leave immediately with the Union to the southern tip of the continent, to interfere with such shipment. The Union entered the channels of the strait on August 13 and reached Punta Arenas, where it was known that the shipment had already been made. García y García did not order any hostile act against the civilian population, which was very grateful and sent a delegation to express it directly. Although the objective was not achieved, this was a memorable trip, because of the superior mentality and technical expertise of the Peruvian sailors.

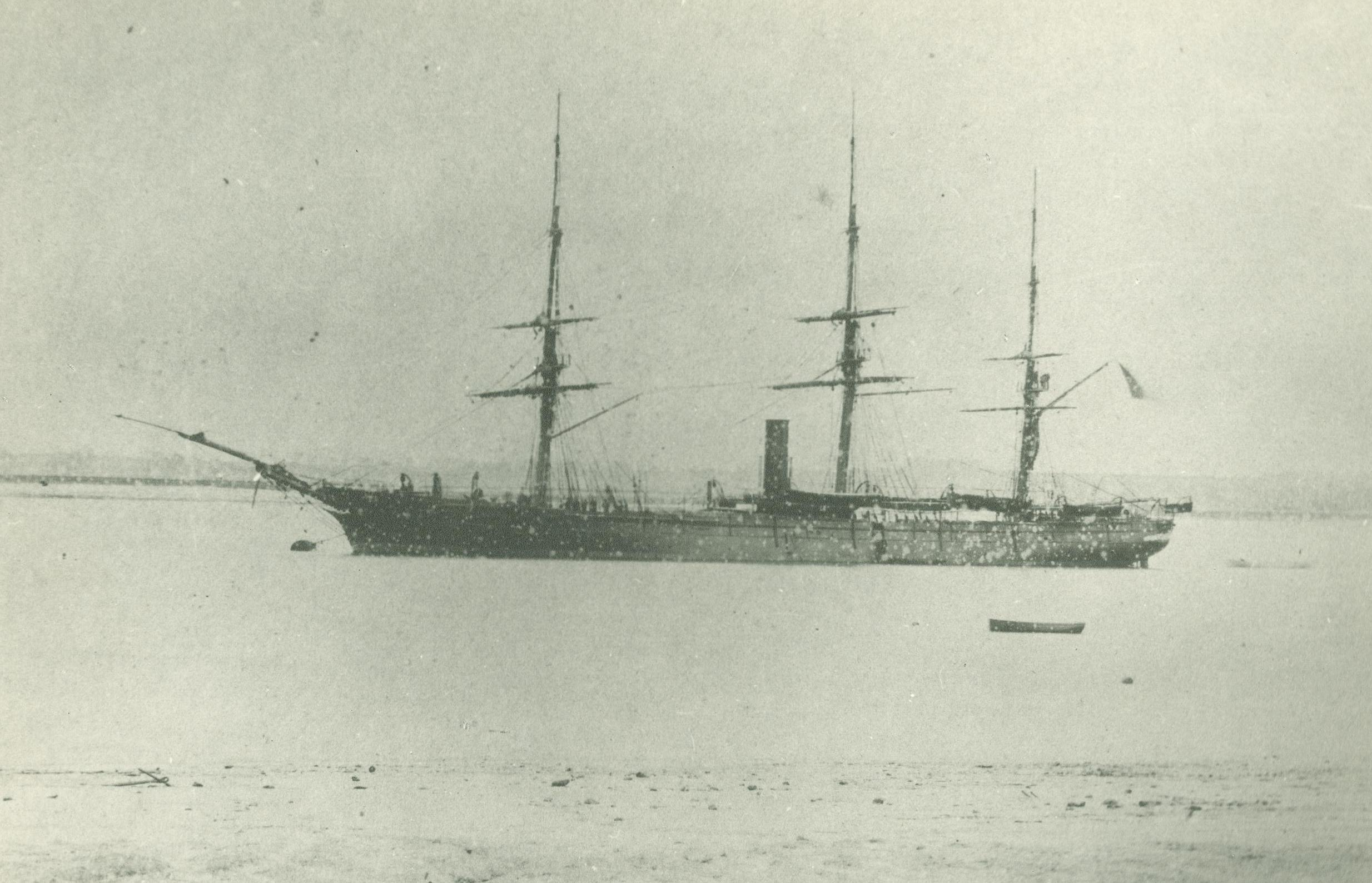
Peruvian corvette Unión, on board of which Aurelio García y García was Chief of the Second Naval Division of Peru during the naval campaign of 1879.

Next to the Huáscar commanded by Grau, the Union with García y García continued to travel the Chilean coast, until finally the entire Chilean fleet cornered them in Punta Angamos, on October 8, 1879. Strictly following the instructions given by the Supreme Director of War under such circumstances, Grau ordered the Union to get to safety at full throttle. García y García complied with the order, but not before having tried to attract the attention of the Chilean ships to their ship, in order to separate them and make it possible for the Huáscar to escape. But the Chileans soon discovered the deception and that was how Grau and the crew of the glorious monitor faced the sacrifice alone.

García y García, thanks to the fast walking of their ship, managed to evade the pursuit of the Chilean corvettes Loa and O'Higgins, arriving in Arica, to then set sail for Callao. Already in Lima, he submitted to his own request an investigatory summary to clarify his conduct in Angamos, being acquitted of all charges and responsibilities. Nicolás de Piérola, self-proclaimed Supreme Chief at the end of 1879, included him among his military advisers. Together with Antonio Arenas, he was one of the plenipotentiaries who, on behalf of Peru, participated in the failed peace conferences with Chile held aboard the American corvette Lackawanna, anchored in Arica, in October 1880. He then fought in the Defense of Lima and wounded during the defense, after which he accompanied Nicolás de Piérola in his retreat towards the mountains of Peru, acting as his secretary general. He was appointed representative to the government of Bolivia, with whom he negotiated a Trade and Customs Treaty on June 7, 1881. By then he was promoted to rear admiral.

When Piérola was appointed provisional president by the Assembly of Ayacucho, García y García was appointed president of the Council of Ministers and Minister of Foreign Relations, a position he held from October 30 to November 28, 1881. The ministerial cabinet was made up of Andrés A. Cáceres, Pedro Alejandrino del Solar, Lizardo Montero and Manuel Galup. After Piérola's resignation, García y García returned to Lima, where he was among the founders of the National Party, later called the Democratic Party. On February 5 of 1882, an initiative taken by the same Piérola, in preparation for the future reconstruction of the country.

The Chileans put a price on his head and his house in Lima was looted and burned, for which he had to leave the country. He went to London, where through letters published in the pages of The Times (a daily friend of the Chilean cause) he denounced on the one hand the execrable performance of Chile during the war and on the other he exposed Peru's position on the peace projects. The government of General Miguel Iglesias accredited him as plenipotentiary minister to the British crown and the Holy See, but he resigned after Iglesias' resignation, after the Peruvian Civil War of 1884–1885.

He returned to Lima and assumed the management of a company financed by English investors, which was to exploit the La Unión mines, in Arequipa; but during an inspection trip to these sites, he was the victim of a sudden and serious illness. When he was transferred to Lima, he died aboard the ship Santa Rosa, in front of Callao in 1888. He is buried in the Crypt of the Heroes of the Cementerio Presbítero Matías Maestro.

== Family ==
In 1862 he was the father of the educator Elvira García y García.

In 1864, in the church of San Marcelo in Lima, he married Teresa Lastres y Riglos, daughter of the José María Lastres. His eight children were Aurelio, María, Héctor, Nicanor, Elena Rosa, Angélica, Lucila and Mercedes. His descendants were Héctor García Ribeyro, Enrique García Sayán, Diego García Sayán, Luis Echecopar García and Felipe Osterling Parodi.

His older brother, José Antonio García y García (1832-1886), was a lawyer and diplomat, and served as Minister of Foreign Affairs in 1876-1877. His brother Vidal García y García (1837-1888) was plenipotentiary minister in Chile and winner of the Battle of Callao. Another of his brothers, although less known, was Narciso García y García, who in 1880 was a corvette captain and fought in the Battle of Miraflores under the command of Battery No. 1. His younger brother, Guillermo García y García (1847- 1879), was also a sailor, he died heroically on board the frigate Independencia, during the Battle of Punta Gruesa (May 21, 1879).

== Publications ==
- Route of the coast of Peru (1863 and 1870; translated into English in New York, 1866).
- Notes on the armored frigate Independencia, built in London for the Peruvian navy under the direction and inspection of the frigate captain... (1866).
- Official report that presents to the Supreme Government of Peru... Commander of the armored frigate Independencia on the operations and movements of said ship on its trip from England to the Pacific (1866).
- An indispensable supplement to the pamphlets given to light by Don José M. Salcedo during his escape to Europe in 1867 and after his flight to Chile in 1869 (1869).
- Hunt and seizure of the Chilean war transport Rímac by the Peruvian corvette Unión on June 23, 1879 (1879).
- The Union corvette on October 8, 1879 (1880).
- Memory... to the national assembly meeting in Ayacucho (1881).
- He translated Foxhall A. Parker's Treatise on Naval Tactics (1870) from English.
