= BAP Unión (1865) =

Peruvian corvette

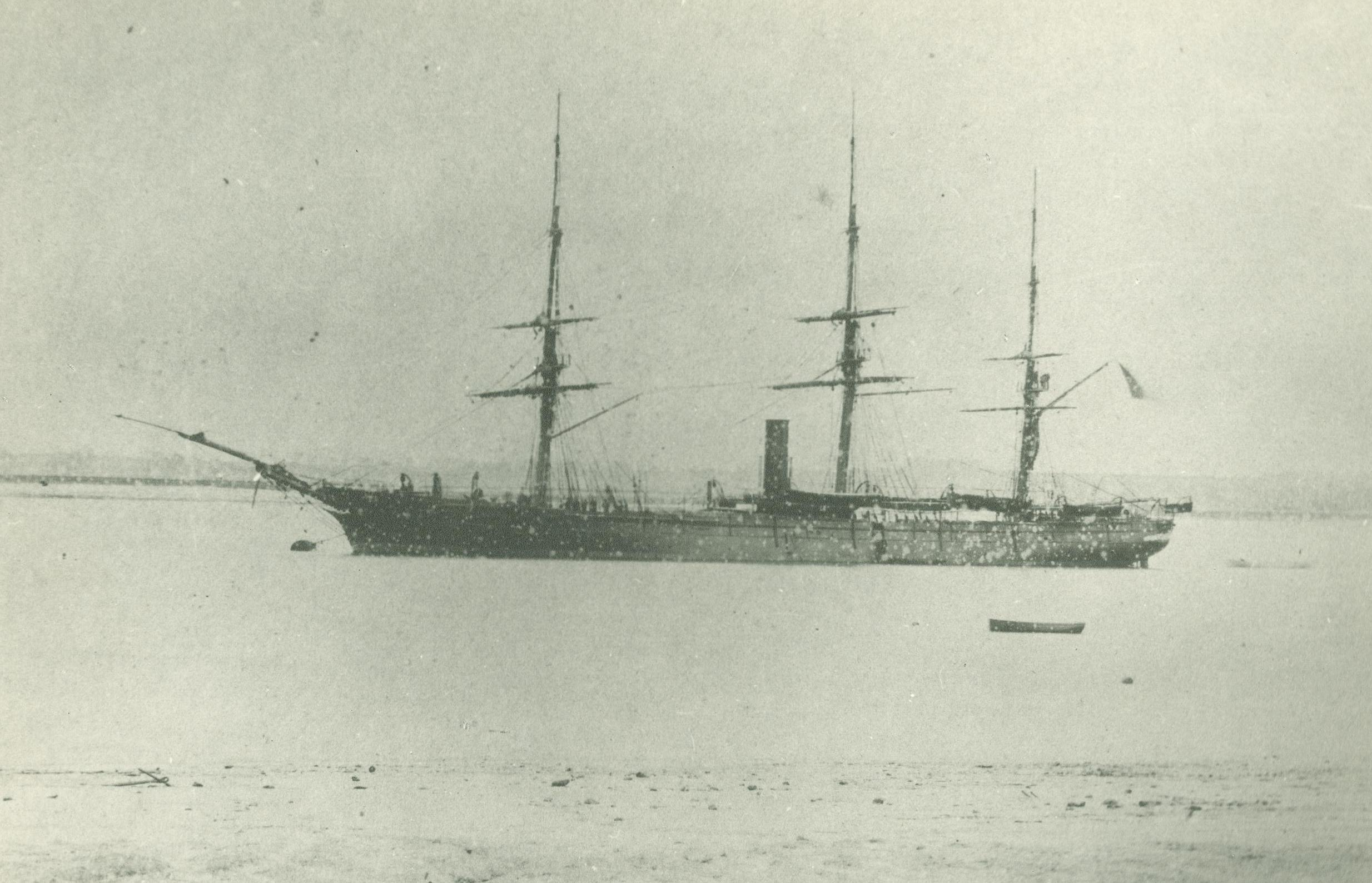
- Unión at anchor, 1880

History

Peru
- Name: Unión
- Ordered: 6 June 1863
- Builder: Chantiers Dubigeon, Nantes, France
- Laid down: December 1864
- Launched: 26 January 1865
- Completed: 10 June 1865
- Fate: Scuttled following the Blockade of Callao, 16 January 1881

General characteristics
- Class & type: Steam corvette
- Displacement: 2,016.66 t (1,984.81 long tons)
- Length: 74.07 m (243.0 ft)
- Beam: 11.12 m (36.5 ft)
- Draft: 5.34 m (17.5 ft)
- Installed power: 2,700 ihp (2,000 kW)
- Propulsion: 1 × Propeller; 1 × Steam engine with 3 cylinders
- Speed: 13 knots (24 km/h; 15 mph)
- Complement: 134
- Armament: 1865: 14x Voruz 162 mm guns; 1873: 12x Voruz 162 mm guns; 1x Whitworth 9-pounder gun; 1879: 12x Voruz 162 mm guns; 2x Armstrong 70-pounder guns; 1x Whitworth 9-pounder gun; 1880: 12x Voruz 162 mm guns; 2x Armstrong 70-pounder guns; 2x Parrott 30-pounder cannons

BAP Unión was a corvette of the Peruvian Navy, originally ordered by the government of the Confederate States of America during the American Civil War. Built in France it was bought by the Peruvian Navy and during its service participated in the Chincha Islands War and in the War of the Pacific in which it was scuttled following the Blockade of Callao to prevent it falling into Chilean hands.

The current Peruvian training ship; BAP Unión, is named after this vessel.

== History ==
=== Construction and purchase ===
During the American Civil War, the Confederate States ordered the French shipbuilder Henri Arman de Rivière to build 4 cruisers. He built 2 in his own shipyard in Bordeaux, under the names of Osaka and Yedo, which were to be called Louisiana and Mississippi. The other two were commissioned from his partner Voruz in Nantes, under the names of San Francisco and Shanghai, which were to be called Texas and Georgia. Due to pressure from American diplomacy, the cruisers were embargoed in 1864 when they were not yet completed. Those in Bordeaux were bought by Prussia, then at war with Denmark, while those in Nantes were bought by Peru in anticipation of a possible war with Spain.

Peru bought the two vessels in November 1864 at a cost of 2.3 million francs, equivalent to 92 thousand pounds sterling, which was more than the Huáscar monitor cost. The San Francisco took the name of America and the Shanghai became the Union. Lieutenant Commander Juan Pardo de Zela took command of the America and First Lieutenant Miguel Grau was assigned to the Union. Both corvettes, which were in Saint Nazaire, prepared to set sail for the Pacific in December 1864.

=== Naval actions ===
==== The campaign in the Peruvian civil war of 1865 ====
When the Union corvette arrived in England from France to enlist a crew, on 17 January 1865, its commander Grau was arrested at Plymouth, accused of having violated the principles of neutrality that the port imposed on all foreign warships. Federico Barreda's energetic protest before Count Russel managed to annul the arrest warrant against Grau, and the Union and its twin America were able to continue their trip to Peru. On 31 March, Miguel Grau, commander of the Union, was promoted to corvette captain.

The Peruvian convoy had to overcome two strong storms in the Atlantic, which is why the ships called in Rio de Janeiro, from 6 to 26 May 1865. When the convoy managed to get ready to sail, it was again surprised at less than one hundred miles off the Brazilian coast by a furious gale that damaged the Union's trees, which re-entered the port of Rio de Janeiro towed by America. Given that the Union's reparations would take almost a couple of months, it was decided that America should continue alone.

On 6 July, the Union anchored in Valparaíso and there its commander learned of the state of affairs in Peru. In Peru, the rebel army was under the command of the captain Lizardo Montero, Grau's childhood friend and with whom he had already participated as rebel sailors in the Peruvian Civil War of 1856–1858, which is why Grau decided to incorporate the Union to the rebel navy, which was made up of the Amazonas frigate, the Lerzundi transport, the Tumbes schooner and the América corvette. The government squad of President Juan Antonio Pezet had the frigate Apurímac, the Chalaco transport, the armored Loa and the Victoria monitor, these last two floating batteries in Callao, so it decided not to confront the rebel navy and remained anchored in Callao during the war. The most important part of the rebel navy was transporting the Rebel Army of the North from Huacho to Pisco, in September 1865, with the Union having to face Apurimac on the high seas.

=== The campaign in the Spanish-South American war ===
On 5 December 1865, the new Peruvian government headed by Colonel Mariano Ignacio Prado signed a treaty of alliance with Chile as a prevention of an imminent war with Spain. A Naval Division was formed under the orders of Captain Manuel Villar Olivera, made up of the frigates Amazonas and Apurímac and the corvettes Unión and América, which marched to Chile. The objective was for the Peruvian squad to join the Chilean squad in southern Chile, to wait for the armor that Peru had bought in England and to initiate a campaign of repression against the Spanish squad in the Pacific. In this way, the corvette Unión began its stay in Chile under the command of the now frigate captain Miguel Grau.

On 14 January 1866, Peru formally declared war on Spain after signing defensive alliances with Ecuador and Bolivia. On 16 January, the frigate Amazonas sank off the extreme southwest point of Abtao Island, in Chayahué, where the allied squadron was stationed. Union participated together with the Peruvian squadron and the Chilean gunboat Covadonga in the Battle of Abtao against the Spanish screw frigates Reina Blanca and Villa de Madrid. Union had the most serious casualties: twelve dead. After this combat, the Union and the entire allied squad withdrew to Huito.

In March 1866, the Chilean captain Juan Williams Rebolledo, commander of the fleet, ordered that neither the Union nor America should go out to look for the Spanish ships in Valparaíso, as had been proposed by their commanders, the sailors Grau and Ferreyros, who wanted to reach that Chilean port before the Spanish frigates to surprise the smaller ships. In April, the Union and America set sail for the Strait of Magellan to look for the new Peruvian armored ships, but returned without finding them, as they were still on the way. The Union was sent in May to Valparaíso to pick up Vice Admiral Manuel Blanco Encalada to take command of the allied squad, but upon leaving Huito, the Chileans fired the cannons on the beach, which had belonged to the Peruvian frigate Amazonas, fulfilling Williams's old order not to let the Union leave, an order that it had not been canceled. The cannonade did not produce any damage.

On 6 June 1866, the allied forces finally joined the new armored ships (frigate Independencia and monitor Huáscar) in Ancud, marching together to Valparaíso five days later. The Union remained there for several months. The Peruvian government hired Commodore John Randolph Tucker, who had fought on the Confederate side in the Civil War, to take command of the Peruvian squad that was to attack the Spanish in the Philippines . The commanders of the Peruvian ships in Valparaíso did not accept that designation and resigned their posts. It was then that Grau left the command of the Union being replaced by the captain of the frigate Juan Guillermo More.

=== Travel to England ===
The Union corvette was sent to England in 1871 in order to change boilers, although it was also asked to change its artillery. Only a 9-pound caliber Whitworth cannon was fitted.

The trip, almost all done under sail, lasted three and a half months with stops in Punta Arenas and Bahia. The repairs took a year at the Greenhite shipyards and the boilers ultimately turned out higher than the previous ones, thus naturally more exposed. The corvette was of return to Peru 11 July 1873, after a trip of 94 days of which it spent a total of 16 in the ports of Plymouth, San Vicente, Montevideo and hours in Cabo Vírgenes, Posesión; Punta Arenas, Playa Parda, Puerto Angosto, etc. It was commanded by the frigate captain Nicolás Portal .

=== Campaign against Huáscar in 1877 ===
An important event in the Peruvian Navy was the Huáscar uprising in 1877. Supporters of Nicolás de Piérola had captured Monitor Huáscar on the night of 6 May 1877. The government of General Mariano Ignacio Prado formed a Naval Division to subdue the rebel monitor. The division was under the command of the captain Juan Guillermo More, composed of the armored frigate Independencia, where More was the commander, the corvette Unión, under the command of the captain Nicolás Portal, the monitor Atahualpa and the Limeña transport, which towed to the monitor.

The Naval Division left Callao on 11 May and met with the Pilcomayo in Iquique . On 28 May, the Independence, the Union and the Pilcomayo faced Huáscar in the Combat of Punta Pichalo, without any success. Finally the Huáscar surrendered to the Peruvian forces under the command of More, on 31 May.

=== Campaign in the Pacific War ===
At the beginning of the war, the Union corvette became part of the Second Naval Division of the Peruvian squad together with the Pilcomayo Gunboat . The commander of the Union was the captain of the ship Nicolás Portal, and that of the Pilcomayo the captain of the frigate Antonio de la Guerra . The division was commanded by captain Aurelio García y García, who raised his insignia in the Union . The Oroya transport was added on 10 May, although in the entire war, they did not expedition together.

==== First expedition ====
The Second Naval Division set sail from Callao on 7 April 1879 and faced the Chilean gunboat Magallanes in the Naval Combat of Chipana on 12 April. This was the first encounter of the war, which resulted in a shootout without consequences. As the Union boilers were in poor condition, he had to return to Callao, remaining under maintenance for almost three months.

==== Second expedition ====
When the Union finished its maintenance in Callao, it left for Arica carrying war supplies, and there, after a meeting between Grau, García and García and President Prado it was agreed to make an expedition over Chilean coasts in retaliation against the bombing of Iquique, which it was a defenseless port. On the night of 17 July, theUnión and Huáscar set sail from Arica. The objective was to capture some Chilean transport, since they knew that these were sent without an escort, while the Peruvian squad did escort the transports.

On 19 July, the Union detained the Chilean frigate Adelaida Rojas in Mejillones, which was carrying 1,700 tons of coal. Cargo and ship was sent to Callao after being marinated by the Union .

In the early hours of the 20th, off Chañaral, the brig Saucy Jack, loaded with copper, fell into the hands of the Peruvian ships and sent to Callao. In that port they destroy the cargo boats. At dawn and in the afternoon of the 21st, the ships were in Huasco and Carrizal Bajo respectively, destroying the mobility elements. On the 22nd they returned to Chañaral and captured the boat Adriana Lucía, loaded with copper, which was sent to Callao.

On 23 July, after a preconceived maneuver, the gunned Rímac steamship was captured with a very valuable cargo: the whole Carabineros de Yungay regiment (258 men), 215 horses, one 300-pounder gun and numerous weapons, ammunitions and supplies.

==== Expedition to the Strait of Magellan ====
Through papers obtained in the Rímac, the Peruvian command learned that the Gleneg steamer was carrying an important load of weapons for Chile: 4 thousand Gras rifles, 16 Krupp cannons and ammunition. Under the command of Nicolás Portal and leading the division commander Aurelio García y García, the Union set out on 31 July for the Strait of Magellan to hunt down the steamer Gleneg .

On 13 August, running a strong storm from the north, the Union sighted the strait and entered it at 3:30 pm, when it was already dark, so they kept to the layer between Westminster Hill and Cape Packer.

After playing in Borja and San Nicolás, it continued to Punta Arenas where the Union arrived on the 16th, causing immense alarm in the population of that colony because it was believed that it was going to be bombed, a fear that was denied by the same Peruvian commander in conversations with the captain of the port, who was informed that the town would not be damaged since they were not bombarding defenseless populations. The Peruvian command learned that, at the end of July, the Chilean armed transport Loa, under the command of Carlos Condell, had arrived in Punta Arenas, and that after two days of waiting it met with the Gleneg, leaving both on 4 August. The Chileans also took away the heavy caliber cannons that defended the mouth of the port, artillery that had been mounted years ago, when the presence of the Argentine squadron was feared. The Union then decided to return to Arica, but first it took several tons of coal from a Chilean pontoon and stocked up with food, buying it from the population. The English consul, leading a delegation, thanked Commander García y García on behalf of the foreign colony, settled in Punta Arenas, for not having harassed the population.

It was unknown in Punta Arenas that those days the Genovese steamship was supposed to arrive with another important shipment of weapons for Chile. The corvette O'Higgins and the transport Amazonas were dispatched to meet them. The Union, ignoring all this, returned to the Pacific on 18 August. The Union sailed without having full rigging. The journey was delayed due to the calm and northerly winds that kept them close to the enemy coast. The coal was finished and Arica finally anchored on 14 September. 45 days had elapsed since his departure.

This commission is considered an impressive feat by Peruvian historians, since a Peruvian navy ship traveled the entire coast of Chile to the extreme south of the continent, despite the precariousness of the journey, even though it was ultimately unsuccessful.

==== Battle of Angamos ====
The Union and the Huáscar traveled to Callao to escort the steamer Rímac, which was supposed to carry an important war cargo to southern Peru. The Rímac left some war supplies in Arica, at the same time that President Prado and Grau discussed a new incursion into Chilean ports; Grau suggested that the Union and Huáscar should return to Callao to maintain their ships, but as this would take a month, Prado insisted on an expedition further south, after which they would go to Callao before 15 October. On 30 September 1879, the convoy left Arica and arrived in Iquique the same day, landing in that port the troops of the Explorer Division (1500 men) of General Bustamante. The following day, the Union and the Huáscar went south, while the Rímac returned to Callao.

In Sarco, the Peruvian ships seized and sent the Coquimbo sailboat to Callao and then continued, believing not to be seen, to the anchorage of this name (where an English and an American warship was) and reached Tongoi, beyond the parallel 30°, already close to Valparaíso. On the way, since their departure from Arica, they were in contact with five steamers of the Pacific Steam Navigation Company; but none had or gave news of the Chilean squad.

In Coquimbo they had to stand in front of the bay to repair the Huáscar machine and at 5 pm on the sixth they returned north. At 9 am on the seventh, the Huáscar had to stop again due to another interruption in the machine, taking the opportunity to transfer coal to the Union and at 12 at night they sighted the lights of the port of Antofagasta at whose entrance the Union stood guard, while the Huáscar recognized the bay.

On the eighth, the naval combat of Angamos took place, when the Huáscar and the Union were encircled by the Chilean fleet. The Union, following the instructions previously given for such circumstances, escaped in the direction of Arica, being pursued by the Corvettes Loa and O'Higgins, which abandoned the pursuit in Huanillos, due to the higher speed of the Peruvian corvette, and also because, they belatedly realized that what the Peruvian ship was trying to do was separate them from the rest of the Chilean squad. Already in Arica, when the Huáscar had already been taken by the Chileans, the Union went to Callao for maintenance that would last a month.

By allowing Grau to withdraw from the Union, all he did was adhere to the instructions given by the War Director, President Mariano Ignacio Prado, dated 30 September in Arica, in which article 7 read: "In no case will rear-admiral Grau compromise any of the ships under his command and if he encounters enemy ships in transit, he will only fight with lower forces, unless he is unable to retreat from superior forces, in which circumstances he will fulfill his duty."

However, many considered the action of the Union, as abandonment of the combat post. Commander Aurelio García y García, at his own request, submitted to an investigative summary to clarify his conduct in Angamos, being acquitted of all charges and responsibilities on 17 May 1880.

==== Loss of the Pilcomayo ====
After almost a month of maintenance, the Union went on its fifth expedition in the war, under the command of the captain Nicolás Portal. On 8 November 1879, he arrived in Arica escorting the Peruvian transport Chalaco, which was carrying war supplies. On 17 November, the Pilcomayo, the Chalaco and the Union left Arica for the north.

At dawn on the 18th, the Union was far to the north over Punta Coles, in the direction of Callao; the Chalaco near the coast and the Pilcomayo more open than the others and following its course to Mollendo. The Union encountered the armored Blanco Encalada and immediately headed south in search of its companions to warn them of the presence of the Chilean frigate, but finally, the Blanco Encalada surprised the Pilcomayo and captured it.

==== The sixth expedition ====
The Union, on the orders of President Prado, left Callao on 17 December 1879 and arrived in Mollendo on 20 December, where it landed 1,500 rifles and uniforms for the division that was stationed in Arequipa . This division had been formed in Cusco and would be the 10th division of the Army of the South, passing to Tacna after being armed, but the new president transformed it, after having changed its main leaders, into the 1st division of the Second Army del Sur, which had just been created and would be based in Arequipa.

==== The last expedition of the Union: Double breaking of the blockade of Arica ====
The new government of Peru, represented by Nicolás de Piérola as Dictator, gave command of Unión to Captain Manuel Villavicencio. On 12 March 1880, he set out with the steamer Talisman on his seventh and last expedition in the war. The Talisman carried a shipment of supplies to Quilca and the Union to Arica. The Union cargo consisted of 37 boxes with shoes, 39 bundles of white canvas, 1 box with 190 thick buttons, 5 boxes with 2 complete machine guns, 100 boxes with 100 thousand cartridges for Remington rifles and the new torpedo boat Allianza, which would serve to monitor the bay of Arica and defend the monitor Manco Cápac from possible attacks (which was acting as a floating battery).

In the early morning of 17 March, the Union, sheltered in darkness and absolute silence on board, entered Arica, sailing recklessly close to the coast and outwitting the blocking squad, which was at sea. The Union's maneuver was received with joy not only by the Peruvian garrison, but also by the crews of the foreign warships, who had noticed and observed the maneuvers of the Peruvian corvette. The scoffed blockers only realized what was happening in broad daylight, when the Union was already unloading supplies. The Chilean ships Cochrane and the Amazonas joined the Huáscar and they opened fire on the Peruvian corvette and also on the monitor Manco Cápac until after 2 pm. Both ships answered and were aided by the Morro and North batteries. The unloading operations were able to conclude without difficulties.

The head of the Cochrane Juan José Latorre called the commanders of Huáscar and Amazonas aboard his ship to deliberate on how to prevent the daring Peruvian ship from escaping from the Arica roadstead. Just at that same moment, after 5 pm, the Union set sail at full speed, not heading north as its adversaries believed, but heading south, circumventing the blockade for the second time, which drew applause from the crews of the neutral ships and the uproar of the population that crowned the Morro and other nearby places.

The Chilean ships undertook the pursuit of the Union, but abandoned it at night. After this feat, which astonished locals and strangers, the Union arrived in Callao on 20 March. He had accomplished his mission successfully, breaking the Arica blockade twice. His casualties were several wounded and one dead.

==== The blockade of Callao and scuttling ====
From 10 April 1880, the Blockade of Callao by the Chilean squad began and in the early hours of that day led to the Union being trapped. The torpedo boat Guacolda tried to sink the Union with one of its boom torpedoes, but was unsuccessful because the corvette it had been surrounded by a palisade and the boom torpedo exploded 10 meters from the ship.

In the bombing of 22 April, the Union chimney was perforated and had other failures in the dead work. In the middle of 1880, its cannons were dismantled and several were used to bombard the San Cristóbal hill before a possible Chilean landing in Ancón.

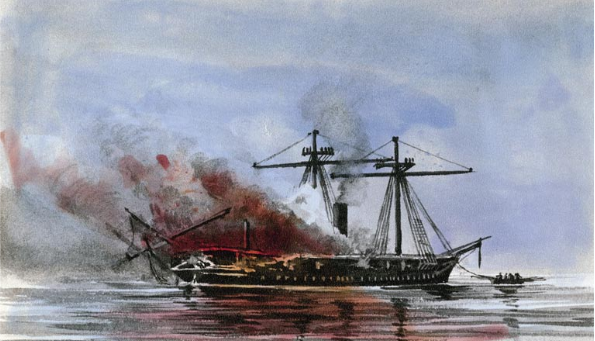
The Unión being scuttled. Painting by Rudolph Edward March Phillipps de Lisle

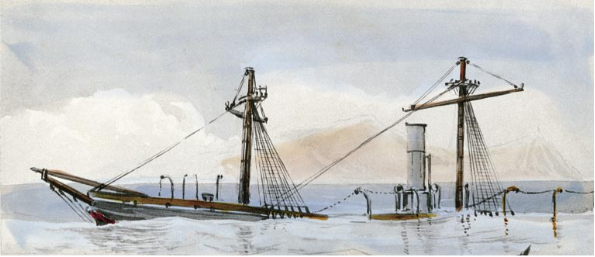
The Union following its scuttling. Painting by Rudolph Edward March Phillipps de Lisle

Finally, on 16 January 1881, the Union and other ships of the Peruvian Navy were sunk in Callao to prevent them from falling into Chilean hands, after the Lima Campaign ended . The Union was stranded north of the Callao bay, its stern burned in part and its machinery destroyed.

==== Subsequent events ====
As the mainmast of the corvette Union emerged for several years in the mouth of the Rimac River, when he was director of the Peruvian Naval School, the captain Ernesto Caballero and Ballasts, was removed and installed in the courtyard of the main entrance of the Higher education center, located on the Figueredo boardwalk in La Punta where officers of the Peruvian Navy are trained year after year. Since then, the main door of said Naval School was renamed Puerta Unión and it is the door through which naval cadets enter and leave on standby as a reminder of the performance of the Peruvian Navy in the War of the Pacific.

In 2014, in honor of the corvette Unión, the BAP Unión (BEV-161), a four-masted sailing training ship belonging to the Peruvian Navy, was launched and named after her. Built in the shipyards of the SIMA Peru, in Callao and commissioned in 2016 for the service of its Peruvian Naval School. It is considered the largest sailing ship in the Americas and the second largest in the world. The BAP Unión (BEV-161) also operates as an itinerant ambassador of the country on its various journeys around the world.
