= Peruvian gunboat Pilcomayo =

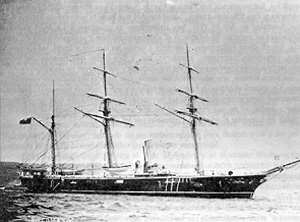
- Pilcomayo

History

Peru
- Name: Pilcomayo
- Ordered: March 1872
- Builder: Money Wigram and Sons, Blackwall, England
- Laid down: 1873
- Launched: 1874
- Commissioned: 1874
- Captured: Captured by Chile at the Tocopilla, 18 November 1879

Chile
- Decommissioned: 1909

General characteristics
- Type: corvette
- Displacement: 600 long tons (610 t)
- Length: 52.12 m (171 ft 0 in)
- Beam: 8.35 m (27 ft 5 in)
- Draught: 3.35 m (11 ft 0 in)
- Installed power: 1080 HP at 10,0 knots
- Propulsion: On steam; 1 horizontally placed reciprocating steam engine John Penn & Sons.; 1 × retractile screw; On sail
- Sail plan: Three masts Barque square-rigged
- Speed: 11.5 knots (21.3 km/h; 13.2 mph)
- Range: 1836 nmiles at 9,0 knots
- Complement: 130
- Armament: 2 × 70 pounds Armstrong gun; 4 × 40 pounds Armstrong guns; 1 × .44 cal Gatling gun; Armoured ram bow

The Pilcomayo was a gunboat of the Peruvian Navy which was involved in several actions during the War of the Pacific. Captured by the Chilean Navy on November 18, 1879, she was repaired and participated in the blockade of the Peruvian ports. After the war, it was used for hydrographic research, then as a training ship. In service until 1909, Pilcomayo was finally used as a pontoon at Talcahuano.

== General technical characteristics ==
Its hull was made of nailed teak, copper-bottomed and reinforced with galvanized iron cross bracing. Its four-boiler 1080-horsepower engine, manufactured by J. Penn & Company of Greenwich, gave it a maximum speed of 11.5 knots measured on August 7, 1874, lower than that of its sister ship the Chanchamayo. Its armament consisted of 6 guns: two six-inch Armstrong 70-pounders, one to starboard and one to port, and four 4.75 inch Armstrong 40-pounders, two per side. A Gatling gun was added shortly before the start of the war.

== Construction ==
Four million sols was budgeted for the purchase of two ironclads and two gunboats, but only the gunboats were eventually bought. These, the Chanchamayo and the Pilcomayo, were built between 1872 and 1874 by order of the Peruvian government at the Money Wigram shipyards in Blackwall, Great Britain arriving in Callao on January 11, 1875.

The name of this ship was originally supposed to have been the Putumayo, after a river in Peru, but the ship's painter confused it with the gunboat Pilcomayo which was being built for Argentina at the J. and G. Rennie shipyard in Greenwich at the same time.

== Naval actions ==
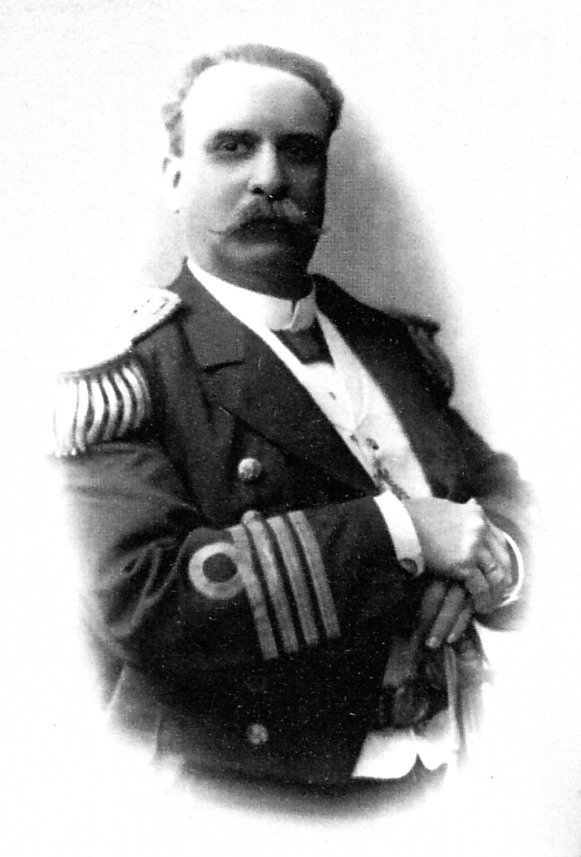
Antonio C. de la Guerra, captain of the Pilcomayo

In 1877, it was part of the naval division that the government formed to hunt down the rebel ironclad Huáscar. During the War in the Pacific, on April 7, 1879, it left Callao together with the corvette Union and took part in the battle of Chipana under the command of frigate captain Antonio C. de la Guerra, returning to Callao on April 17.

== Expeditions off the coast of Bolivia and Chile ==
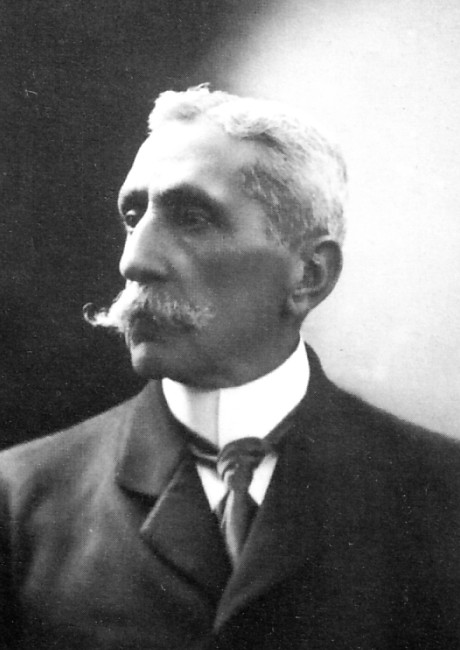
Carlos Ferreyros, captain of the Pilcomayo

It was ordered out to sea again on June 29, 1879, this time under the command of Captain Carlos Ferreyros, setting sail from Callao and arriving in Arica on July 2 with a shipment of 2,000 rifles for the Bolivian army. On July 4, it escorted the transport ship Oroya to Pisagua, arriving the same day and then continuing its journey south.

Frigate captain Carlos Ferreyros now made for Tocopilla; passing at night between the coast and Chilean warships, he entered Tocopilla on July 6 at 9:00. In the port, he surprised the Chilean merchant "Matilde" and three other boats loaded with food and fodder. After sending a delegation ashore to assure the local people that he would not bombard the town, he sank the "Matilde" with five cannon shots and destroyed the other boats.

After the Tocopilla action, Ferreyros ordered full speed toward Antofagasta to surprise the Chilean military camp stationed there. But at 12:20 p.m. he sighted the Chilean ironclad Blanco Encalada, accompanied by the corvette Chacabuco and the transport ship Limarí, coming from Iquique after bombarding es:Pabellón de Pica.

On spotting the Chilean ships, Ferreyros steered close to the coast to escape and then sped away heading north, pursued by the Blanco Encalada for almost 20 hours. The Pilcomayo arrived in Arica on July 8 at 3:00 am and the Chilean naval division abandoned the pursuit.

On July 15 the Pilcomayo was ordered to Cobija to capture enemy transports if she found them, on the assumption that the Chilean ironclad Almirante Cochrane was in Iquique and the Blanco Encalada in Antofagasta, but on the way she encountered the Cochrane and the Chacabuco, sailing from Iquique to Antofagasta. The Cochrane pursued the Pilcomayo between July 17 and 18 without being able to reach her, and the Pilcomayo arrived in Arica on the 22nd. After a brief tour off Pacocha, she returned to Callao on July 26 carrying 28 prisoners from the captured transport Rímac.

== Other action ==
On August 23, the Pilcomayo set sail from Callao escorting the transport Chalaco, arriving at Arica on August 26. On September 13, near Arica, it ran into the Blanco Encalada carrying es:Rafael Sotomayor, the Chilean War Minister, and the artillery transport Itata commanded by Patricio Lynch, evaluating landing points for the planned Chilean invasion. The Pilcomayo fired 10 shots at them as it attempted to draw them into a fight, but they held their distance and the Pilcomayo’s was fire was answered by 6 shots from the Itata.

On October 5, a Chilean squadron arrived in Arica and at 9:30, the Pilcomayo set out on the orders of President Mariano Ignacio Prado to face them, which it did at 10:00. At 9.50 am, the gunboat Covadonga and then the corvette O'Higgins separated from the Chilean convoy. A fight broke out between the Pilcomayo and the O'Higgins 6 miles from Arica, between 10:30 and 11:30, in which the Pilcomayo fired 21 shots and the O'Higgins, 16 shots.

== Capture ==
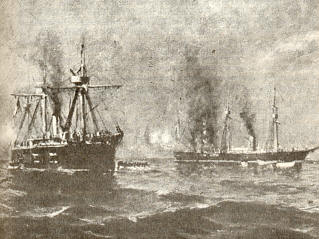
Capture of the Pilcomayo

On November 18, 1879, around 9:00 a.m., the Chilean ironclad Blanco Encalada was in the vicinity of Mollendo when it sighted three columns of smoke to the south that it recognized as the Peruvian corvette Union, the transport Chalaco and the Pilcomayo.

The Union, sailing in the lead of the Peruvian flotilla, then recognized the Blanco Encalada and turned south to warn the others. The Peruvians agreed the tactic would be for the Union to draw off the Blanco Encalada, relying on its superior speed and thus avoiding the capture of the other two ships. The Union therefore headed west at low speed while the Pilcomayo sailed south at full speed and the "Chalaco" changed its course to the southeast, close to the coast.

On board the Blanco Encalada, Chilean commander Galvarino Riveros knew the speed of the Peruvian ships and did not fall into the trap, deciding to hunt down the Pilcomayo at full speed. When the Commander of the Pilcomayo realized that the Blanco Encalada was rapidly closing the distance between them, he gathered his officers and they agreed to sink the ship rather than surrendering. They continued to retreat in order to gain time to execute this plan.

When the Blanco Encalada had closed to 5,000 meters, the Pilcomayo opened fire, without hitting its target. The Chilean did not return fire until 4,200m, hitting the Pilcomayo‘s foremast. At this time, Commander Ferreyros opened the valves to flood the engine and the magazine, and ordered flammable material to be poured out so the ship could be set on fire. The aft guns were aimed at wardroom hatch to pierce the hull below the waterline. Then he ordered the destruction of all codes, correspondence and documents on the ship.

The fire was started, the ship stopped and the boats were lowered to take off the crew. The Chilean Admiral Riveros, seeing white flags raised on the boats, gave the order to cease fire and stop the engines so that Lieutenant Roberto Goñi could board the Peruvian ship. Once the Pilcomayo was boarded, Goñi replaced the Peruvian emblem with the Chilean one and did everything he could to save the ship, lashing it to the Blanco Encalada so that its bilge pumps could prevent its sinking while the Chilean crew put out the fires. In two hours, divers had managed to seal the leaks and the fires had been put out.

The Chileans towed the Pilcomayo into the port of Pisagua, arriving on November 20, where the Peruvian prisoners were taken ashore, before heading to Valparaíso which they reached on December 4, to the joy of the population who crowded into the streets to pay tribute to the victorious sailors. The Pilcomayo remained in Valparaiso while it underwent repairs.

== Later service ==
After the War of the Pacific it was used for hydrographic work, in addition to a training ship for midshipmen.

During the Chilean Civil War of 1891, he remained in Buenos Aires.

It was in the service of the Chilean Navy until 1909, where it was converted into a pontoon in Talcahuano.
