= Second Battle of Iquique =

1879 naval battle during the War of the Pacific

- Part of Naval campaign of the War of the Pacific
Date	July 10, 1879
Location	Iquique, Tarapacá, Peru
Result	Indecisive

Belligerents
Peru	Chile

Commanders and leaders
Miguel Grau	Enrique Simpson; Juan José Latorre

Strength
1 ironclad	1 ironclad, 1 gunboat and 1 transport

Casualties and losses
2 wounded	5 wounded, 1 transport damaged

The Second Battle of Iquique was a naval battle of the War of the Pacific that occurred on July 10, 1879. During the battle, the Huáscar faced the 2nd Chilean Naval Squadron which was blockading the port which lead to both forces to face each other.

== Background ==
The Peruvian ironclad Huáscar arrived in Arica on July 8, 1879. At Arica, President Mariano Ignacio Prado gave him the order to go to Iquique, while taking advantage of the darkness, sink one of the ships blockading Iquique, since he had information that night as the Chilean squadron withdrew from Iquique and only one ship remained to blockade the port. This ship was the corvette Abtao, but what Prado did not know was that since the night of July 8, Chilean ships had orders to go out to sea every night. Naval Captain Enrique Simpson, commander of the blockading Chilean division, reported that on the night of July 7 an attack was attempted with a torpedo boat on the Matías Cousiño, a charcoal burner of the Chilean squad which was mistaken for the Abtao however in Peru, there were no documents or evidence that certified a torpedo attack.

The Huáscar arrived in Pisagua at 9 pm on July 9 to reconnoiter the port, but the commander of the Huáscar, Captain Miguel Grau Seminario, decided not to waste time and the Huáscar left Pisagua at 10 pm without taking any information from the current status of Chilean ships in Iquique.

== The Battle ==
The Huáscar arrived in Iquique at 0:45 am on July 10 and since there was no Chilean ship, 2nd Lieutenant Fermín Diez Canseco was sent to go ashore to get reports. He obtained the report that at 3 pm on the 9th, the corvette Abtao and the transport Matías Cousiño had left and at 6 pm, the ironclad Almirante Cochrane and the corvette Magallanes did the same. The mission was over however, as there was no Chilean ship in the port, but Grau decided to set off again to look for them, despite the fact that the chances of running into the ironclad Almirante Cochrane, which he was forbidden to confront, were great.

About 10 miles from Iquique, at 2:20 a.m., the Huáscar's lookout spotted the Matías Cousiño, which was commanded by Captain Augusto Castelton. The Chilean transports spotted the Peruvian ship and was told to surrender, but the captain of the Matías Cousiño, bearing in mind the instructions of its owner, replied that he was not authorized to lower the Chilean flag and fled. Surprised, the Huáscar moved away and began to bombard the transport. The Matías Cousiño began to move so as to offer the smallest possible target, which didn't prevent at least three hits from affecting it, one of these projectiles penetrated her hull and lodged in one of her bunkers. Grau orders to board the Chilean ship to capture it for Arica, but realizing the proximity of the Chilean squad, he orders the crew to abandon it and to sink it. The Matias Cousiño insisted on escaping, so the Huáscar continued to shell her, causing heavy damage to the hull.

At the sound of the shots, the corvette Magallanes came, the Huáscar undertook to withdraw by mistaking the gunboat for the Almirante Cochrane, but realizing that it was a smaller ship that was approaching, Grau decided to attack the approaching Chilean ship . A fight between the Huáscar and the Magallanes began after the Magallanes was confused for the Abtao.

The Magallanes was under the command of the frigate captain Juan José Latorre and when he was 300 m away, he fired a can of shrapnel at him with his 64- pound cannon, starting the fight between the two, which was between 3:00 am and 3:35 am. A.M. Near the Huáscar and the Magallanes, they fought blindly shooting each other. At all times, the Magellan tried to contain the Huáscar to give time for the Chilean armored Cochrane to come to its aid. Due to the poor aim of the shots, Grau decided to use the Huáscar 's spur to sink the Magallanes ., but the Chilean gunboat was very maneuverable and was well led by Captain Latorre, avoiding Huáscar 's spur on several occasions; the closest was the last one, which passed 10 meters from the stern . A projectile from the 115-pound cannon of the Magallanes hit the Huáscar's hull squarely without piercing it.

The Magallanes fired 1 shot at 115 pounds, 1 canister of 64-pounder shrapnel, 6 at 20-pounders, 1 canister of 20-pounder shrapnel, 2,400 shots from the Comblain rifle and 360 from the Adams revolver; while the Huáscar, 6 300-pounders and several rifles and machine guns.

After the sounds of the cannons and the flares fired by the Magallanes were heard, the ironclad Almirante Cochrane began to arrive. When it was 2,000 meters from the scene of the combat, the Huáscar headed north to avoid it. The pursuit of the Huáscar by the Almirante Cochrane and the Magallanes lasted until 11 a.m. on July 10, when the Chilean ships reached Pisagua, desisting because the Huáscar was faster than the Almirante Cochrane.

The Abtao wasn't present in this combat since it was undergoing repairs far from the port

== Aftermath ==
Both sides claimed victory in the battle. The Huáscar was unable to fulfill its mission of sinking one of the Chilean ships because there were none when it reached Iquique. In her confrontation with the Magallanes, she used the ram unsuccessfully because the Chilean gunboat was a well-maneuverable ship, which had a double propeller, the ram being an effective weapon against almost immobile ships, such as the corvette Esmeralda. She evaded the hunt of the Chilean naval division and suffered no damage, however, the Chilean transport Matías Cousiño was badly damaged, leaking constantly.

It was notable that Captain Latorre was able to confront an inferior ship such as the Magallanes against an armored vessel such as the Huáscar, allowing enough time for the Almirante Cochrane to approach the battle and hunt down the Huáscar, which couldn't be specified due to the highest speed of the Peruvian ship.

Due to this action, the Peruvian Congress recommended to the Executive to grant Miguel Grau the rank of Rear Admiral. On August 28, 1879, the Executive approved the law of Congress that granted Miguel Grau promotion to Rear Admiral for the Battle of Iquique and the Second Battle of Iquique.
