= Elías Aguirre =

Peruvian sailor and commander (1843–1879)

Elías Aguirre Romero
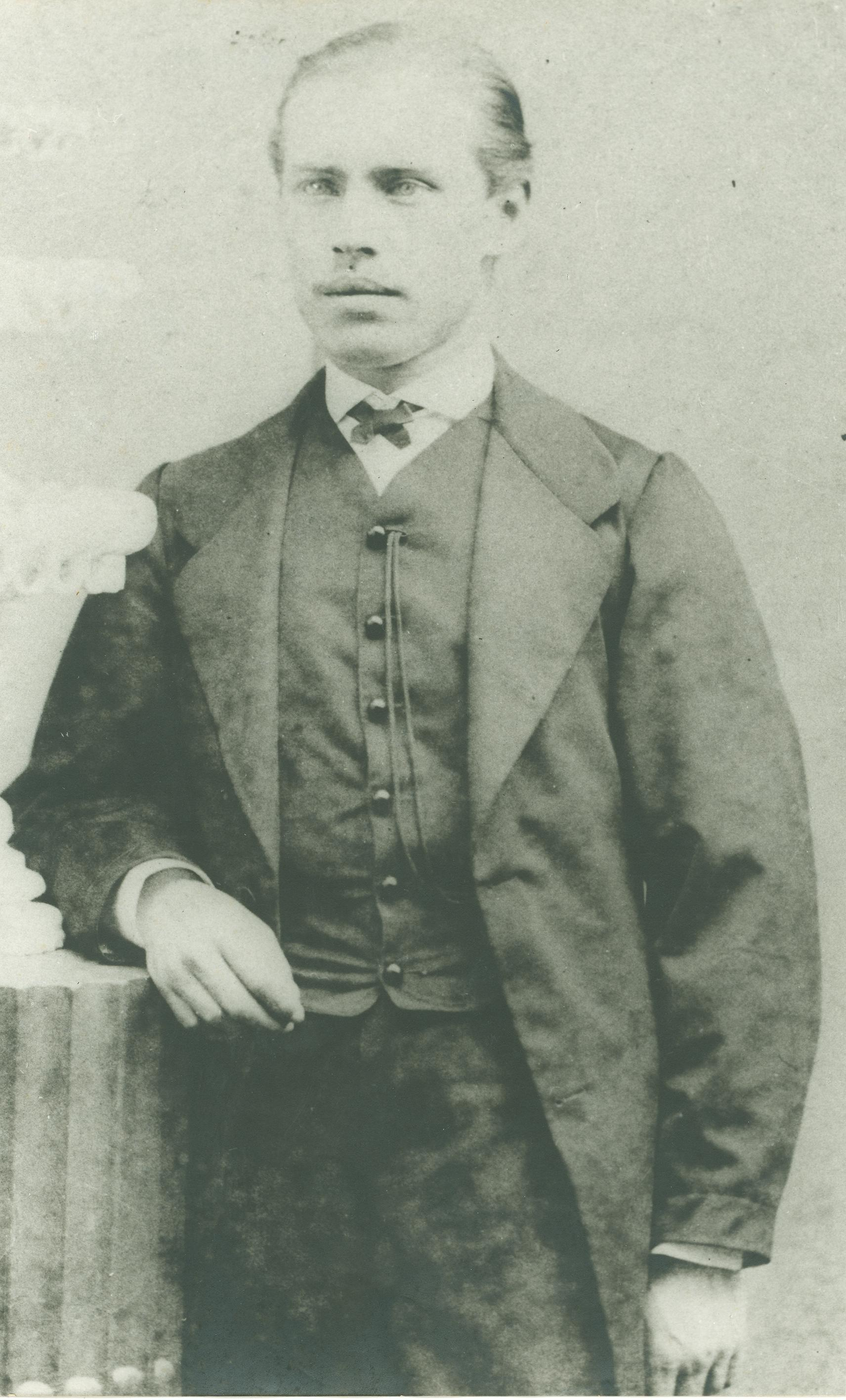
- Aguirre in 1860
- Born: 1 October 1843; Chiclayo, Peru
- Died: 8 October 1879 (aged 36); Litoral Department, Bolivia (now part of Chile)
- Occupation: Commander in the Peruvian Navy
- Years active: 1860–1876 and 1879
- Awards: Steel Cross of the Legion of Merit (posthumous); National hero of Peru

Remigio Elías Aguirre Romero (Chiclayo, Peru; 1 October 1843 – Punta Angamos, Peru; 8 October 1879) was a Peruvian sailor and naval commander during the War of the Pacific. As second commander of the monitor Huáscar, he was killed in the Battle of Angamos.

== Biography ==
He was the son of Carlos Aguirre and María Candelaria Romero. After completing his elementary studies in Chiclayo, he moved to Lima in 1854, entering the Lyceum directed by the brothers Manuel Trinidad and Isidoro Mariano Pérez.

In 1858, he entered the Peruvian Naval School in Callao, receiving the title of second lieutenant (guardiamarina) on 3 August 1860. With this title he embarked on the frigate Amazonas.

He was successively promoted to Ensign in 1864 and to Second Lieutenant in 1865. He then transferred to the corvette Unión, aboard which he participated in the naval Battle of Abtao on 7 February 1866, where the allied fleets of Peru and Chile defeated the Spanish squadron during the Chincha Islands War. For his participation, he earned a promotion to First Lieutenant and the title of "Meritorious Citizen of the Homeland".

He was among the Peruvian sailors who protested the election of American Commodore John R. Tucker as head of the national squadron. He was then discharged from service and put on trial, but was acquitted, as were the rest of the protesting sailors.

In August 1867 he returned to service, embarking on the Apurímac, where he remained until January 1868.

In November 1868 he traveled to the United States as part of the commission of Peruvian sailors assigned to crew the monitors Atahualpa and Manco Cápac, which were towed. American sailors refused to navigate these ships on the risky voyage to Peru, as they were designed for river navigation and not for the high seas; for this reason, the Peruvian sailors took on the challenge. Aguirre took the position of second commander of the Manco Cápac, and then transferred to the corvette Unión, which joined the convoy in Rio de Janeiro, bringing the new commander of the Division, Captain Manuel Ferreyros (December 1869). After a year and a half of travel, the monitors finally arrived on Peruvian coasts in June of 1870, completing a mission that was then considered a naval feat.

Appointed as second commander of the corvette Unión, he traveled in it to England with the mission of inspecting the repairs the ship needed. Upon his return, he translated and published a work on studies related to navigation in the Strait of Magellan, which at the time had to be sailed through on voyages from Peru to Europe. He was promoted to effective corvette captain in 1870.

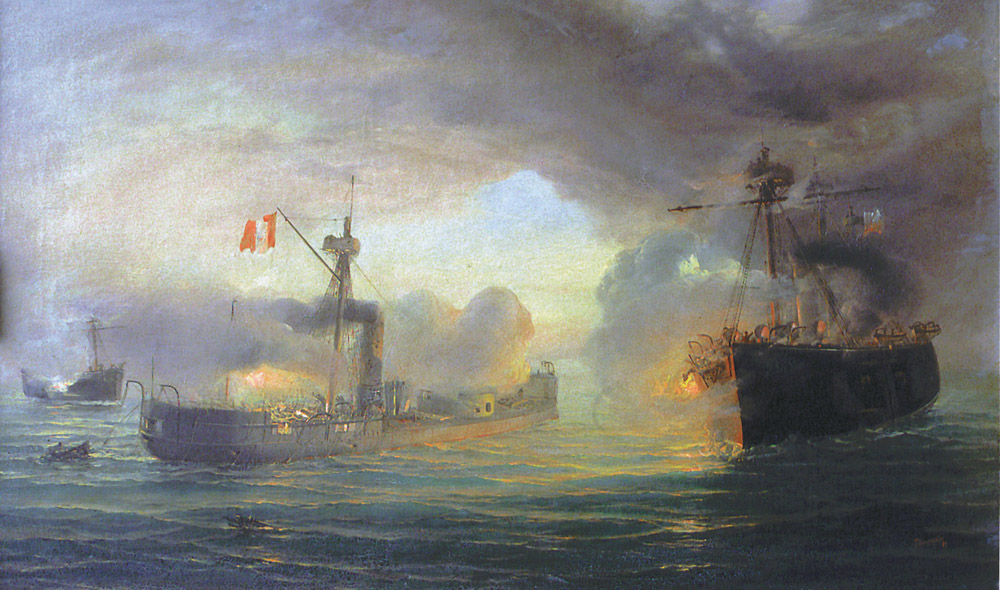
The Battle of Angamos

He was appointed Deputy Director of the Naval School, and in 1875 he took command of the gunboat Chanchamayo, crewed by young graduates from the Midshipman School. In that role, he confirmed his reputation as a serious, educated seaman. But when the ship was wrecked, off Falsa Punta Aguja, he was dismissed and prosecuted (1876). Nobly, he defended all his officers and requested the full rigor of the law for himself. Separated from the squadron, he dedicated himself to the guano business, taking a position in the guano loading company in Pabellón de Pica (then part of Tarapacá Department).

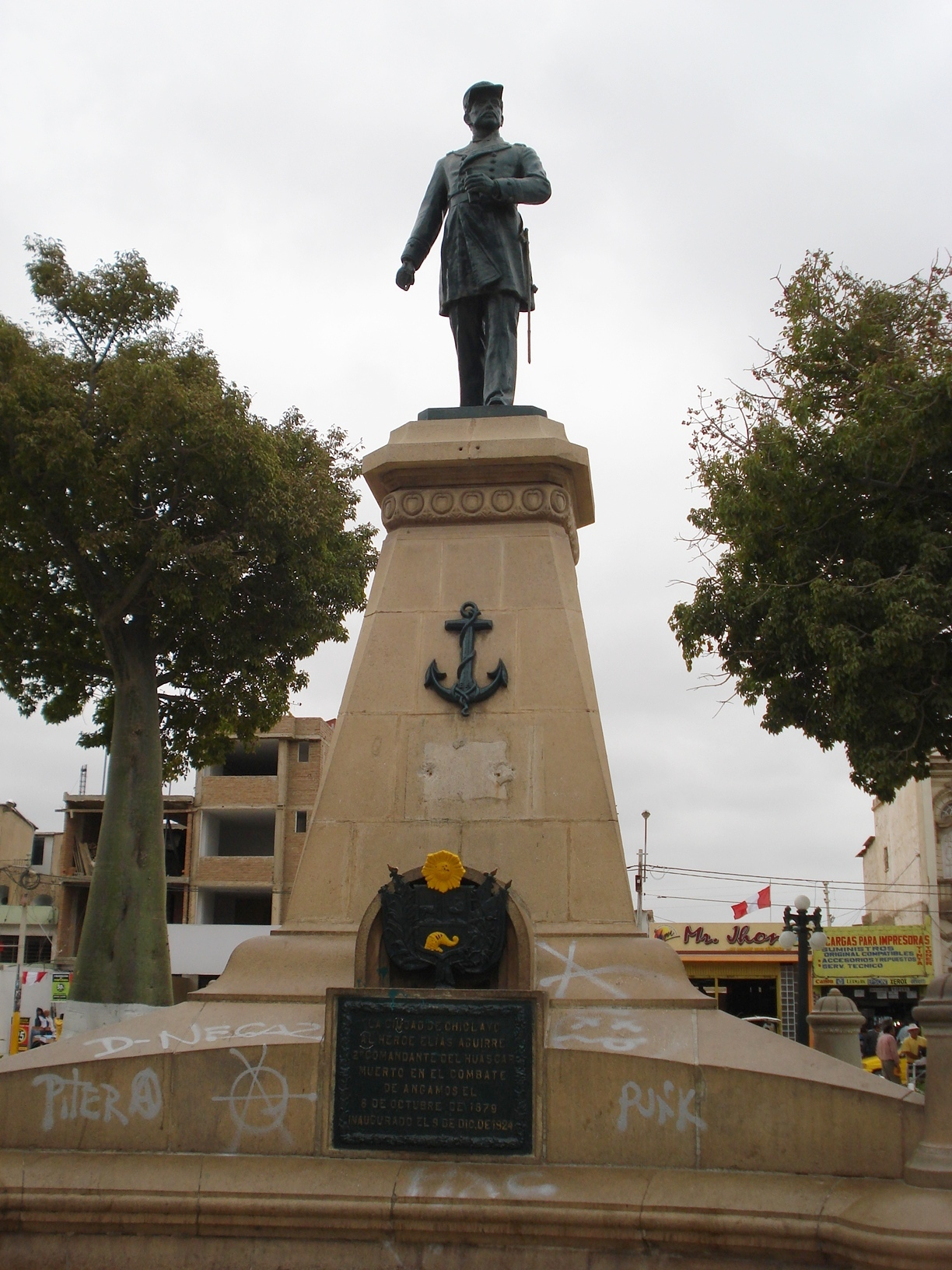
Monument in memory of the Battle of Angamos in Chiclayo

When the War of the Pacific broke out in 1879, Elías Aguirre again offered to serve in the navy. His request was immediately accepted, and he was assigned to the corvette Unión, in which he participated in the Battle of Chipana on 12 April 1879, the first naval engagement of that war. Aware of his merits and his great capacity as a seaman, Miguel Grau requested the government to transfer Aguirre to the Huáscar ironclad. This request was accepted in July, and Aguirre was appointed second commander of that ship. For July to October, he was aboard the ship with Grau until it was necessary to risk an unequal combat against the enemy squadron in Angamos. When Grau fell dead, Aguirre assumed command and control of the Huáscar. Seeing himself besieged by the fire and the onslaught of enemy ships, he boldly ordered to ram the armored cruiser Blanco Encalada, and during the maneuver, he was hit by a shell, which ended his life. It was the morning of 8 October 1879.

On 28 May 1880, the martyrs of the monitor Huáscar, including Commander Elías Aguirre, were decorated with the "Steel Cross of the Legion of Merit."

His remains rest in the Heroes' Crypt of the Presbítero Matías Maestro Cemetery in Lima, alongside other combatants of the War of the Pacific such as Grau, Cáceres, and Bolognesi.

== See also ==
- Miguel Grau
- Naval campaign of the War of the Pacific
- Peruvian Navy

== Bibliography ==
- Basadre, Jorge (2005). Historia de la República del Perú (1822 - 1933). Vol. 8. El Comercio S. A. Lima. ISBN 9972-205-70-3.
- Castañeda Martos, Alicia (Edition and compilation): Viaje de los Monitores Manco Cápac y Atahualpa desde el Atlántico al Pacífico 1868 - 1870. Fondo de Publicaciones Dirección General de Intereses Marítimos. Lima, 1991. Printed at Talleres Gráficos de CESY GRAF S.A.
- Ortiz Sotelo, Jorge - Castañeda Martos, Alicia: Diccionario Biográfico Marítimo Peruano. Asociación de Historia Marítima y Naval Iberoamericana, Lima, 2007. Printed by Jhire Grafel S.R.L. ISBN 978-9972-877-06-3
- Tauro del Pino, Alberto: Enciclopedia Ilustrada del Perú. Third Edition. Volume 1. AAA-ANG. Lima, PEISA, 2001. ISBN 9972-40-150-2
