= Naval campaign of the War of the Pacific =

Naval campaign that took place from 1879 to 1884

- Part of the War of the Pacific
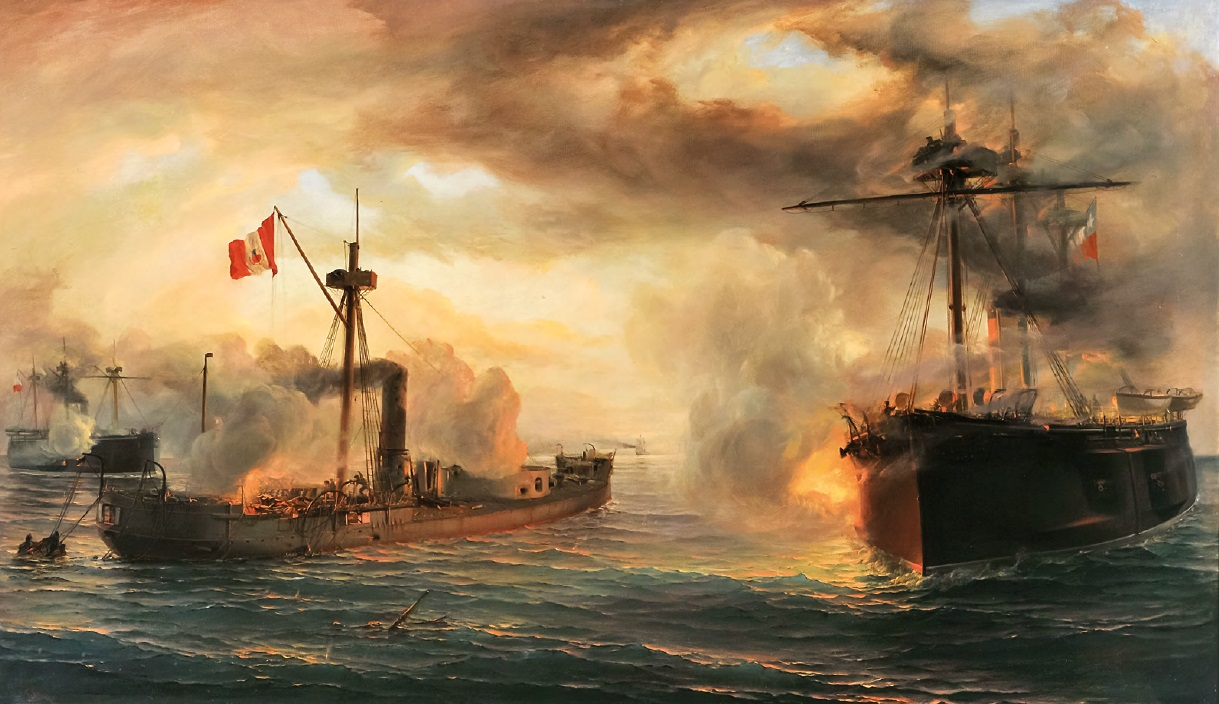
- Capture of the ironclad Huáscar, oil painting by Thomas Somerscales.
Date	1879 – 1881
Location	Coast of Chile, Bolivia and Peru; Pacific Ocean, South America
Result	Chilean victory: Chile gains naval superiority against the allies.

Belligerents
Chile	Peru

Commanders and leaders
(Chile) Juan Rebolledo; (Chile) Galvarino Cárdenas; (Chile) Juan Latorre; (Chile) Arturo Prat †; (Chile) Carlos Condell; (Chile) Erasmo Escala; (Chile) Manuel Baquedano; (Chile) Luis Castillo; (Chile) Justo Cuevas; (Chile) Manuel Thomson †; (Chile) Enrique Simpson; (Chile) Aureliano Sánchez †; (Chile) Ignacio Gana (surrendered)	(Peru) Miguel Grau †; (Peru) Juan Guillermo; (Peru) Carlos de los Heros †; (Peru) Aurelio García; (Peru) Germán Astete; (Peru) Nicolás Portal; (Peru) Carlos Ferreyros (surrendered); (Peru) Manuel Villavicencio; (Peru) Camilo Carrillo; (Peru) José Lagomarsino; (Peru) José García; José Becerra

Strength
1879:(prewar); 2 ironclads 9 wooden ships 4 torpedo boats 1880: 3 ironclads 8 wooden ships 10 torpedo boats	1879:(prewar); 4 ironclads 7 wooden ships 2 torpedo boats 1880: 3 ironclads 7 wooden ships 2 torpedo boats

Casualties and losses
Total: 891; 219 killed 257 wounded 408 captured 1 cannon captured 4 ships sunk 1 ship captured 1 ship damaged	Total: 421; 46 killed 33 wounded 329 captured 4 missing 6 ships sunk 2 ships captured 1 submarine destroyed
- At least 15 Peruvian civilian casualties

The Naval campaign of the War of the Pacific or Saltpeter war, was a naval campaign that took place from 1879 to 1884, involving Peru (as well as Bolivia), and Chile, undertaken in order to support land forces in the Atacama Desert. Although the conflict lasted until 1884, the primary naval engagements occurred in 1879 and 1880. Due to the rough terrain and few transport methods it was imperative to have control of the ports in order to have a good supply source in the region. It resulted in a successful campaign by Chile, and the success of their land campaigns eventually led to a Chilean victory, which cut off Bolivia's access to the coast.

== Navies and ships involved ==
In 1879 Bolivia did not possess any ships, but on March 26, 1879, Bolivian President Hilarion Daza Groselle formally offered letters of marque to any ships willing to go to combat for Bolivia. Bolivia had not signed the Paris Declaration Respecting Maritime Law but the United States, Britain and France stood by the treaty and refused to accept the legality of Bolivia's act. Since Bolivia did not have any ports because Chile had occupied them, and because Peru discouraged the use of Letters of Marque, the naval conflict was left to be resolved between Chile and Peru.

The power of the Chilean navy was based on the twin central-battery ironclad frigates, Cochrane and Blanco Encalada. The rest of the fleet was formed by the corvettes O'Higgins, Chacabuco, Abtao, and Esmeralda, the gunboat Magallanes, and the schooner Covadonga.

The Peruvian navy based its power on the broadside ironclad frigate Independencia and the monitor Huáscar. The rest of the fleet was completed by the corvette Unión, the gunboat Pilcomayo, and the coastal monitors Atahualpa and Manco Cápac, purchased from the United States at the end of the Civil War. The coastal monitors cannot be classed among the seagoing ships of Perú as they were permanently stationed, one at Callao and the other at Arica. Although both the Chilean and Peruvian ironclads seemed evenly matched, the Chilean ironclads had twice the armor and held a greater range and hitting power

Warships of Chile and Peru at the beginning of the War of the Pacific
Warship (Chile)	tons (L.ton)	Horse- power	Speed (Knots)	Armour (Inch)	Main Artillery	Built; Year	Warship (Peru)	tons (L.ton)	Horse- power	Speed (Knots)	Armour	Main Artillery	Built; Year
Ironclad Capital ships
Cochrane	3,560	2,000	9–12.8	up to 9	6 × 9-inch guns 2 × 50-pound guns 1 × 20-pound gun 1 × 9-pound gun 1 × Nordenfelt gun	1874	Huáscar	1,130	1,200	10–11	4 1/2	2 × 300-pound guns 2 × 40-pound guns	1865
Blanco Encalada	3,560	3,000	9–12.8	up to 9	6 × 9-inch guns 2 × 50-pound guns 1 × 20-pound gun 1 9-pound gun 2 × Nordenfelt guns	1875	Independencia	2,004	1,500	12–13	4 1/2	2 × 150-pound guns 12 × 70-pound guns 4 × 32-pound guns	1865
Ironclad Coastal monitors
							Manco Cápac	1,034	320	6	10	2 × 500 pound guns	1864
							Atahualpa	1,034	320	6	10	2 × 500-pound guns	1864
Wooden ships
O'Higgins	1,670	1,200	12		3 × 115-pound guns 2 × 70-pound guns 4 × 40-pound guns	1866	Unión	1.150	450	12–13		12 × 70-pound guns 1 × 12-pound gun	1864
Chacabuco	1,670	1,200	8–10		3 × 115-pound guns 2 × 70-pound guns 4 × 40-pound guns	1866	Pilcomayo	600	180	10–11		2 × 70-pound guns 4 × 40-pound guns 4 × 12-pound guns	1874
Abtao	1,05	300	6		3 × 150-pound guns 3–4 × 40-pound guns	1864	Limeña	1,163	450	12		2 × 40-pound guns	1860
Magallanes	950	1,200	11		1 × 115-pound gun 1 × 64-pound gun 2 × 20-pound guns	1872	Oroya	1,159	400	12		2 × 40-pound guns	1873
Covadonga	412	140	5		2 × 70-pound guns 2 × 9-pound guns	1858	Chalaco	1,000	300	12–14		4 × 70-pound guns 2 × 12-pound guns	1893
Esmeralda	850	200	3		12 × 40-pound guns	1854	Talismán	310	90	10–11			1871
Amazonas	1,970	2,400	11		1 × 6-inch gun	1874	Mayro	671	250	5–6		2 × 12-pound guns	1861
Angamos	1,180	480	14		1 × 8-inch gun	1875							
Toltén	240	240	270			1875							
Torpedo boats
Colo Colo	30	60	12.5		2 × Hotchkiss guns 2 × 14-inch Spar torpedoes	1880	Republica, Allay		100	16		2 × Spar torpedoes	
Tupacel	30	60	12.5		2 × Hotchkiss guns 2 × 14-inch Spar torpedoes	1880							

== Engagements ==
=== Blockade and battle of Iquique ===
In one of the first naval tactical moves of the war, the Peruvian port of Iquique was blocked by of the Chilean Navy. In the Battle of Iquique, which took place on May 21 of 1879, the Huáscar sank the Chilean corvette Esmeralda. At around the same time, the Peruvian frigate Independencia chased the Chilean schooner Covadonga through shallow coastal zones until the heavier Independencia rammed against a rock and ran aground in Punta Gruesa. The strategic result of the naval battles of Iquique and Punta Gruesa were to lift of the blockade of the port of Iquique.

=== Excursions of the Huáscar ===
The outgunned Huáscar managed to avoid engagement with the superior battleships of the Chilean navy for 6 months. Among the actions of these "Excursions of the Huáscar" are the Battle of Antofagasta (May 26, 1879) and the Second Battle of Antofagasta (August 28, 1879). The most successful of the excursions was the capture of the steamship Rímac on July 23, 1879. Not only was the ship captured, but the cavalry regiment Carabineros de Yungay which was on board was also captured, making this the largest loss of the Chilean army so far. This caused a crisis in the Chilean government which in turn caused the resignation of Admiral Juan Williams Rebolledo commander of the Chilean fleet, who was replaced by Commodore Galvarino Riveros Cárdenas, who devised a plan to catch the Huáscar.

=== Battle of Angamos and the Capture of the Huáscar ===
Due to their successes, the Huáscar, and her captain Miguel Grau Seminario, became the primary target for the Chilean navy. In September 1879, the decision was made to launch a land invasion of Peru with the intention of sectioning off Callao and Arica. The navy was split into two parts, under the control of Admiral Galvarino Riveros Cárdenas, and planned to blockade Callao and Arica. In order to be successful, Grau and the Huáscar needed to be eliminated. The battle took place on October 9, 1879, it involved the Chilean ironclads Cochrane and the Blanco Encalada, and the Peruvian ironclad Huáscar and wooden Unión. Admiral Grau believed he could evade the Cochrane due to his perceived speed advantage, but he was unaware of the upgrades to the ironclad that elevated its speed to 12 knots, which equaled the Huáscar. After falling into the Chilean trap, the Huáscar had no choice but to engage the Cochrane. At 9:25 AM, the Huáscar fired on the Cochrane, which prompted the ironclad to move close to the Huáscar. After getting closer to the Huáscar, the Cochrane opened fire, striking the Huáscar multiple times. At 9:45 AM, one of the shots hit the conning tower of the Huáscar, which was occupied by Admiral Grau, killing him instantly. By 10:10 AM, the Blanco Encalada arrived, and by 10:55 AM, the battle was essentially over. After failing to intentionally sink the ship, the remaining crew of the Huáscar were captured and the ship was added to the Chilean fleet. By eliminating the most formidable Peruvian ship and Admiral Grau, the Chilean gained control of the sea, which they would retain for the remainder of the conflict. This was the last engagement at sea between the two navies. The Chilean navy began to focus on blockades, and used their weaponry to support land troops, and bombarded cities.

=== Blockade of Arica ===
The blockade of Arica was conducted by the Chilean navy's ships Cochrane, Covadonga, and an unnamed armed transport, all three having arrived by December 7, 1879. The town of Arica was relatively well defended, with four batteries including one on a bluff, the other three built of sand and turf. Several foreign ships observed during the blockade, including corvettes from the US, France, and the UK. They also observed, on the 13th, an allied army of mixed armament, about 2,000 strong, augmenting the garrison to around 8,000. Many were native Amerindians from the mountains.

Arica was later taken by Chile in the Battle of Arica, on June 7, 1800, after the town had been weakened by the blockade, which prevented supply from the sea.

=== Blockade of Callao ===
Callao was the primary port in Peru, located only eight miles (13 kilometers) from the capital city, Lima. The blockade began on April 10, 1880, and would last until January 17, 1881. Lima was captured by Chilean land forces on December 17, 1880, and when the Peruvian navy got word of this, they scuttled all the ships that were still in Callao's port. The city would be taken a month after Lima on January 17, 1881, which led to the eventual Chilean victory.

== See also ==
- Chilean torpedo boat Colo Colo
