= Chilean ironclad Almirante Cochrane =

Chilean ironclad ship (1874)

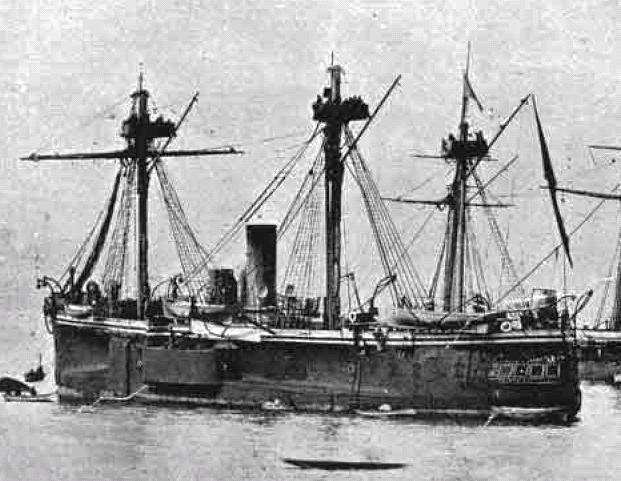
- Chilean battery Cochrane

History

Chile
- Name: Almirante Cochrane
- Builder: Earle's Shipbuilding Co., Hull
- Cost: 2,000,000 pesos
- Laid down: 1873
- Launched: 23 January 1874
- Completed: December 1874
- Decommissioned: 1933
- Out of service: 1908
- Reclassified: as training ship, 1898
- Fate: Scrapped 1934

General characteristics
- Class & type: Almirante Cochrane-class ironclad
- Type: Central battery ship
- Displacement: 3,480 long tons (3,540 t)
- Length: 210 ft (64.0 m)
- Beam: 46 ft 9 in (14.2 m)
- Draught: 19 ft 8 in (6.0 m)
- Installed power: 3,000 ihp (2,200 kW)
- Propulsion: 2 shafts, 2 Trunk steam engines; 6 cylindrical boilers
- Sail plan: Barque rig
- Speed: 12 knots (22 km/h; 14 mph)
- Range: 1,200 nmi (2,200 km; 1,400 mi) at 10 knots (19 km/h; 12 mph)
- Complement: 300
- Armament: in 1879: 6 × 9 in (229 mm) muzzle-loading rifles; 1 × 20-pounder gun; 1 × 9-pounder gun; 1 × 7-pounder gun; 1 × 1-inch (25 mm) Nordenfeldt machine gun
- Armor: Belt: 4.5–9 in (114–229 mm); Battery: 6–8 in (152–203 mm); Deck: 2–3 in (51–76 mm); Conning tower: 4.5 in (114 mm); Bulkheads: 6 in (152 mm)

Almirante Cochrane was a central battery ship of the Chilean Navy in the late nineteenth century. She was built, like her twin, Blanco Encalada, in the UK in 1875. She participated in the War of the Pacific, with her most prominent action being her victory over the Peruvian turret ram Huáscar in the Angamos naval battle. Almirante Cochrane was part of the forces that defeated President José Manuel Balmaceda in the Chilean Civil War of 1891.

The ship was named after Thomas Cochrane, a British naval officer who served as the first Vice Admiral of Chile, leading the Chilean Navy during the War of Independence.

== Background ==
In 1871 the president of Chile, Federico Errázuriz Zañartu, initiated a bill in the Chilean congress to authorize the executive to purchase two armored vessels. The bill passed with only one opposing vote (that of the former president José Joaquín Pérez Mascayano), and provided for two medium-sized ships and that the total cost of the purchase would be 2,000,000 pesos.

== Construction and operation ==
The Chilean ambassador to the United Kingdom, Alberto Blest Gana, was placed in charge of the project. Blest Gana hired the British ship designer E. J. Reed, a former naval architect to the British Admiralty, as technical adviser.

The order was placed at Earle's Shipbuilding Co. in Hull, Yorkshire. The central battery ships were to be named Almirante Cochrane and Valparaíso (Valparaíso was subsequently renamed Blanco Encalada). The construction of Almirante Cochrane began in April 1872. The ship was launched and sailed to Chile in 1874, before having been completed, because of fears of a potential conflict with neighboring Argentina and Bolivia. Almirante Cochrane arrived at the port of Valparaíso on 26 December 1874, commanded by Captain Coneyin and returned to the UK to be completed in January 1877, after her sister, Valparaiso had arrived.

In January 1878, once the dispute with Argentina had been settled, President Aníbal Pinto instructed Alberto Blest Gana to arrange for the sale of the two central battery ships in order to alleviate the economic crisis that had prevailed in Chile for several years. On behalf of Blest Gana, E. J. Reed offered Almirante Cochrane to the UK for the sum of 220,000 pounds sterling, but the British declined. Reed then tried to sell the two ships to Russia, but again without success.

She was then rebuilt in 1897-1900 as a gunnery and torpedo training ship. She was scrapped in 1934.

== Design ==
=== Principal dimensions ===
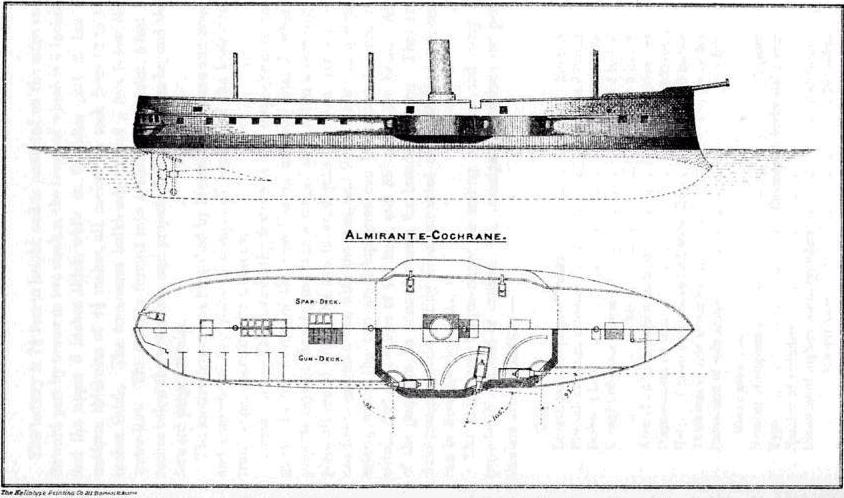
Plan view and profile

Almirante Cochrane was 64.0 m long, with a beam of 14.0 m and a draft of 6.0 m. The hull had a maximum displacement of 3650 t when fully loaded with fuel, fresh water, weapons, ammunition, food and crew. The hull was constructed of iron, held with rivets, and was divided lengthwise into eight compartments (counting piques the bow and stern), by seven iron bulkheads. The bow of Almirante Cochrane had, as was customary in the designs of the late nineteenth century, a sharp spur located 2.0 m (6 ft 7 in) under the waterline and projecting 2.2 m (7 ft 3 in) ahead of the forward perpendicular. She was fitted with a cruiser stern.

=== Armament ===
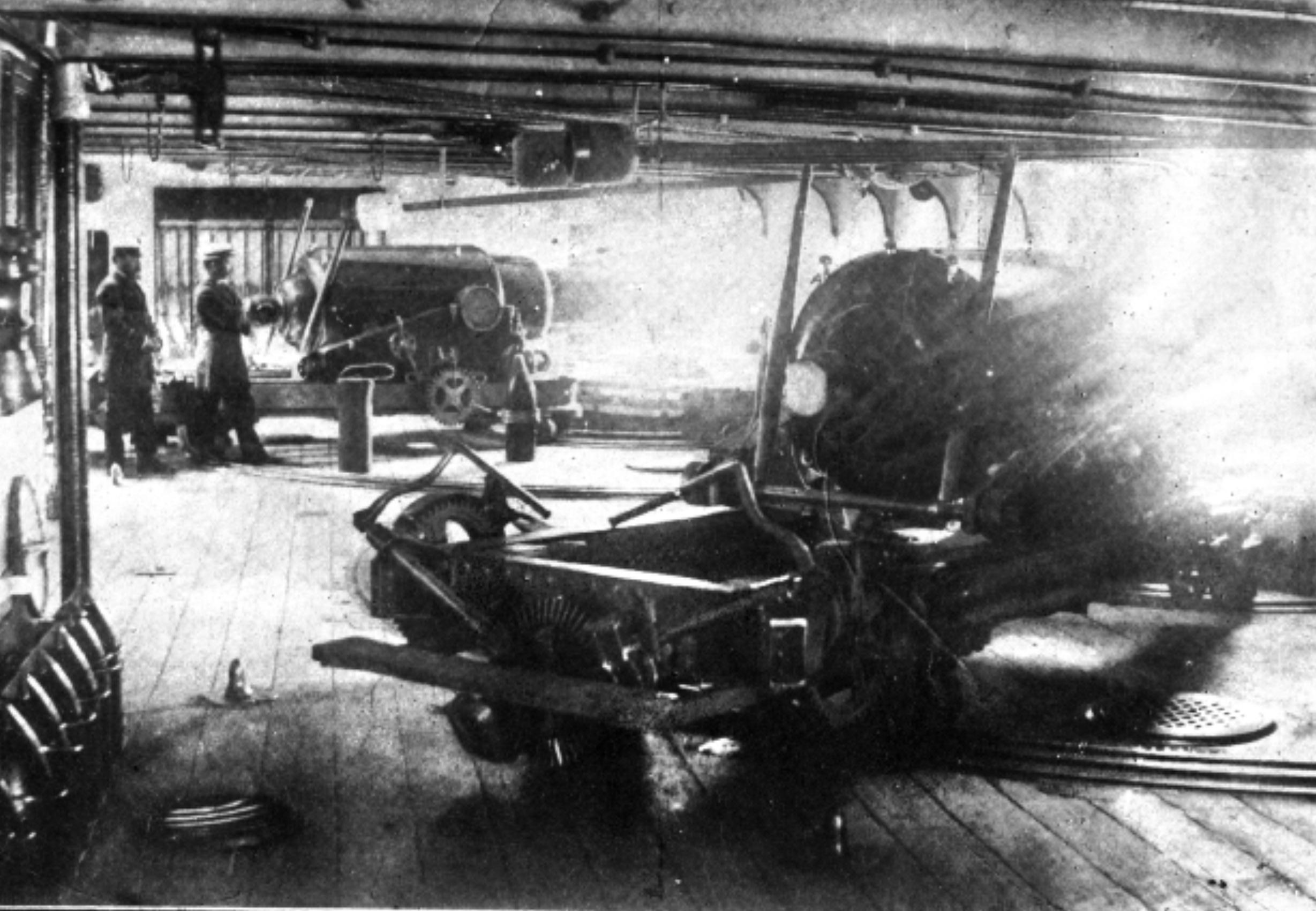
Almirante Cochrane's central battery

The main armament, which was mounted on the central redoubt (central battery), was six 228 mm (9 in) Armstrong guns divided by three-band, mounted heal Scott central pivot, allowing the bow cannon to fire off the sleeve. The centerpiece fired at an angle of 70 degrees and 35 degrees to bow to stern and the third from the hose to the stern (see picture). Supplementing this was a 20-pounder cannon, and one 9 and one 7 pounders, and a Nordenfeldt machine gun installed in the COFA's ratchet, one-inch-caliber (25.4 mm), which fired a one-pound (454 grams) projectile.

Almirante Cochrane also had a steam boat which was equipped with a torpedo on a bowsprit. The only time this boat was used was on the expedition to Callao, where she was used to try to sink Peruvian ships.

=== Armor ===
The ship was protected under the waterline by an armored belt which stretched from around 1.2 m (3.9 ft) under the waterline up to the battery cover. The maximum thickness was 230 mm (9.1 in) at the waterline, the center of the ship, and 115 mm (4.5 in) at the bow and stern. The hull and armor plating were separated by a layer of teak 254 mm (10.0 in) thick to reduce the impact of hits. The battery cover, which was flush with the armored belt, was protected by a 76 mm (3.0 in) armour in the center of the ship, reducing to 50 mm (2.0 in) at the bow and stern. The battery, which had a height of between 2 and 2.5 m, was protected in bands and on the front face by two plates, the lower one 203 mm (8.0 in) and the top one 152 mm (6.0 in) thick. The back of the battery was protected by armor plating 115 mm (4.5 in) thick. Like the armor of the hull, this was bolted to a metal structure with an inner lining of teak 304–355 mm (12.0–14.0 in) thick.

=== Propulsion ===
Almirante Cochrane was fitted with both steam and sail propulsion, being rigged as a barquentine. The power plant, provided by the company John Penn & sons, consisted of two compound steam engines, six boilers and two propellers. The machines had two horizontal cylinders, one high- and one low-pressure. The high-pressure cylinder had a diameter of 1.16 metres (46 inches) while the low-pressure cylinder had a diameter of 1.93 metres (76 inches). The race was two cylinders of 762 mm (2 ft 6.0 in).

The machines were capable of a maximum total output of 1.23 MW (2,920 HP), providing 90 revolutions per minute. These two machines span propeller blades of four to 4.8 metres (15 feet 9 inches) in diameter and 4.72 metres (15 feet 6 inches) of way.

The steam was supplied by six cylindrical tube boilers with a maximum working pressure of 413.6 kPa (60 psi). The total area of 836.12 sq meters of heating era (9000 ft ²).

This propulsion system allowed the Cochrane, during tests over a measured mile, a top speed of 12.8 knots. However, the maximum operating speed was 12 knots. At this speed fuel consumption was 45 tons of coal per day, with consumption of 35 tons per day at the reduced speed of 10 knots.

== Military operations ==
=== War of the Pacific (1879-1883) ===
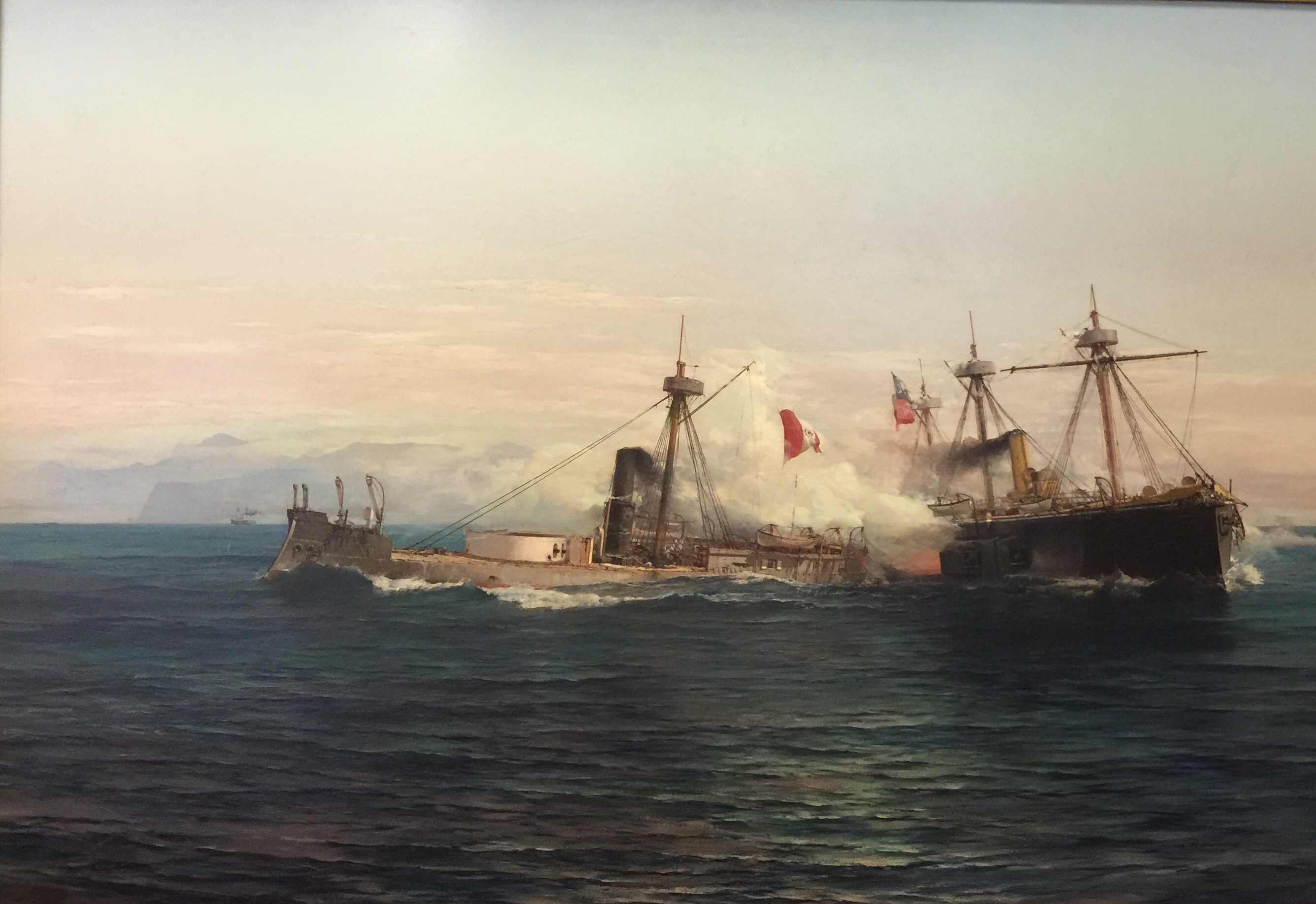
Naval battle of Angamos

Almirante Cochrane participated in the War of the Pacific, most prominently taking part in the defeat and capture of Peruvian monitor Huáscar in the Naval Battle of Angamos, on 8 October 1879. At the start of the war Almirante Cochrane was commanded by Captain Enrique Baeza Simpson and since 5 April was present at the blockade of Iquique.

At the end of June 1879 Almirante Cochrane was the flagship of the 2nd Naval Division, in charge of the blockade of Iquique with the gunboat Magellan, the corvette Abtao and Matias Cousiño. On 16 July, Almirante Cochrane and Matias Cousiño were relieved by Blanco Encalada and Lamar, respectively, and withdrew to Antofagasta.

In August 1879, Almirante Cochrane sailed to Valparaíso and underwent maintenance for the next month. Captain Juan José Latorre then took command. Latorre was also head of the 2nd Naval Division, which also consisted of Loa and O'Higgins. Almirante Cochrane then went on to participate in the decisive naval battle of Angamos. Almirante Cochrane was also present in 1880 when the Peruvian corvette Union broke the blockade of Arica.

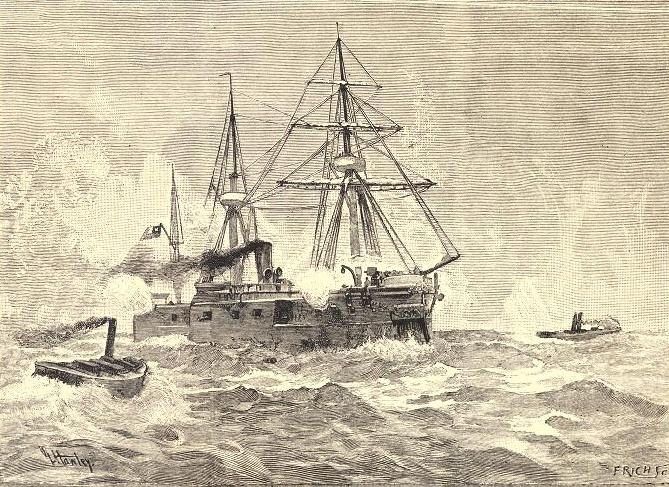
Torpedo boat attacking Almirante Cochrane

=== Civil War of 1891 ===
During the 1891 Chilean Civil War Almirante Cochrane was part of the forces that defeated President José Manuel Balmaceda.

At dusk on 7 January 1891, Almirante Cochrane towed Huáscar, which had had her machines dismantled, from the Bay of Valparaíso to Las Salinas, where Huáscar was prepared for service. On 23 August 1891, she participated in the battle against the forces at Valparaiso, along with the Esmeralda under the command of Jorge Montt. Almirante Cochrane took between 10 and 12 hits, whilst Esmeralda took between 6 and 8.

== Commanders of Almirante Cochrane ==
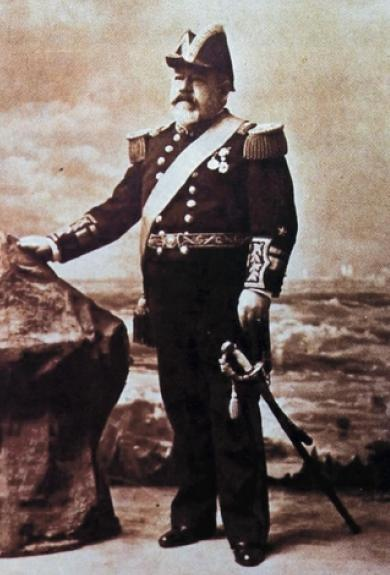
Enrique Simpson Baeza

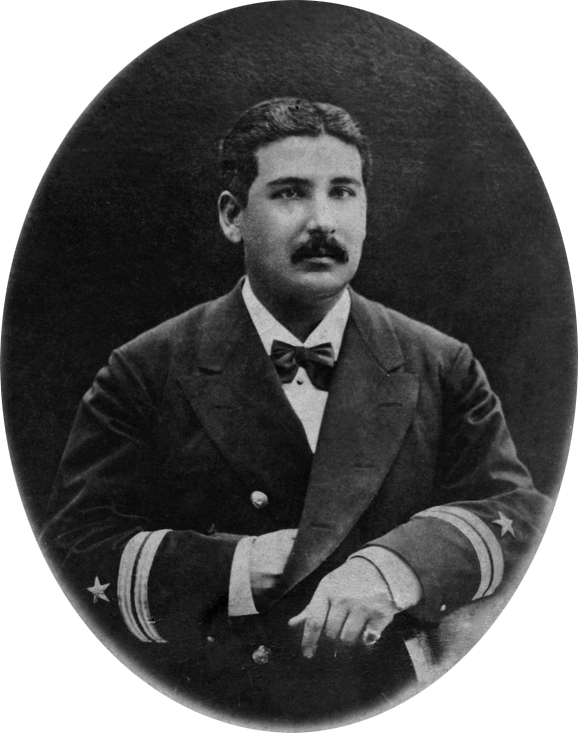
Juan José Latorre

== See also ==
- Blanco Encalada
- Battle of Angamos

== Sources ==
Much of this article was translated from Blanco Encalada (fragata blindada).

- Gardiner, Robert, ed. (1979). Conway's All the World's Fighting Ships 1860–1905. London: Conway Maritime Press. ISBN 0-8317-0302-4.
- Silverstone, Paul H. (1984). Directory of the World's Capital Ships. New York: Hippocrene Books. ISBN 0-88254-979-0.
- "Some South American Ironclads". Warship International. VIII (2). Toledo, OH: Naval Records Club: 203–204. 1971.
