= Galvarino Riveros Cárdenas =

Chilean naval officer

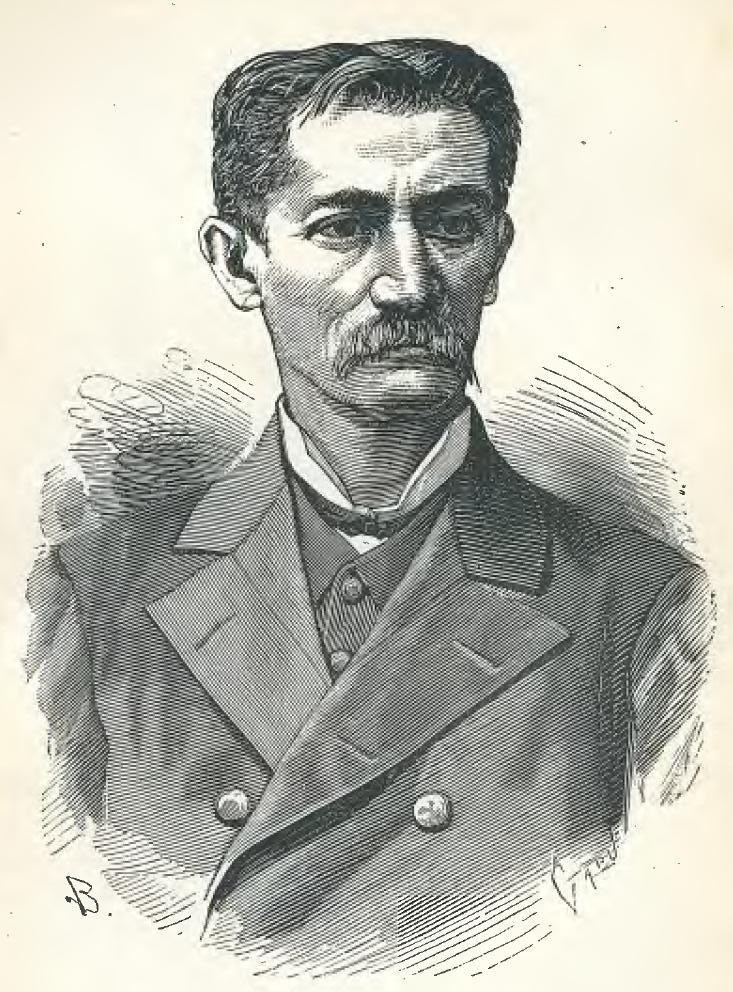
Galvarino Riveros

José Galvarino Riveros Cárdenas (December 2, 1829 – January 11, 1892) was a Chilean naval officer, Commander of the Chilean Squadron during the War of the Pacific.

He was born in Curaco de Vélez, Sector Changüitad, Isla de Quinchao, Chiloé, Chile on December 2, 1829. He was son of Captain Juan Antonio Riveros of the Independencia and of Mercedes Cárdenas, daughter of Lorenzo Cárdenas Díaz, a royalist officer. He lived his childhood in Changüitad, his mother's homeland, near Curaco de Vélez (Quinchao Island). The move occurred shortly after his birth and this has led to various sources being consigned to Changüitad or to Curaco de Vélez as the site of his birth. Nevertheless, this is contradicted by his baptismal certificate, which was filed in Valdivia. In 1843, the general Jose Santiago Aldunate placed him in the military academy after having lost his father.

In 1848 he entered the squadron, and embarked aboard the steamer Chile as a midshipman. Among his companions were the sailors Simpson, Bynnon and Munoz Gamero, later superior heads of the Chilean Navy. In 1848 he made a study trip to Oceania and California aboard the French frigate Poursuivante, under the command of Admiral Legoumet. One of the first hydrographic expeditions was to the Toltén River, in a period in which the Araucanía had not yet been conquered.

He was promoted to lieutenant in 1851, and, under orders of the commander Bynnon, made a trip to Europe in 1857 to bring to Chile the warship Maria Isabel. He was second chief of that ship when he was shipwrecked in Misericordia Bay. In 1859 he was promoted to the rank of Corvette Captain, and Frigate Captain in 1866. In 1863 he was sent to patrol the north coast, from Atacama to Mejillones, with the mission to monitor the border. He had control of the warships "Emeralda", "Independencia", and "Corbeta Abtao". In 1872 he was appointed maritime governor of Valparaiso and in 1876, he obtained the rank of Ship-of-the-line Captain.

== War of the Pacífic ==
At the outbreak of war, he was appointed commander of the Chilean ironclad Blanco Encalada and chief of a naval division that comprised the corvette O'Higgins, the Magallanes, and the transport Amazonas.

After the failure of Juan Williams Rebolledo, he was given the control of the squadron. He captured the Huáscar in the Battle of Angamos on October 8, 1879, by which he virtually annihilated the naval power of Peru. Promoted to the rank of rear admiral of the squadron, he participated in the war using the navy in support of ground forces. When the conflict was over, he returned to Chile with part of the expeditionary army, leaving the command of the squadron to the captain of navy Juan Jose Latorre. He retired from the navy on August 20, 1881.

He died in Santiago on January 11, 1892.
