= Chilean ship Almirante Latorre =

Several ships of the Chilean Navy have been named Almirante Latorre after Juan José Latorre:

- Chilean battleship Almirante Latorre, a dreadnought battleship laid down in Britain in 1911, acquired still unfinished for the Royal Navy in 1914 and completed and put into service as HMS Canada, she was refitted and sold to Chile in 1920, commissioned into the Chilean Navy in 1921, decommissioned in 1958, and scrapped in 1959
- Chilean cruiser Almirante Latorre, a Tre Kronor-class cruiser, the former HSwMS Göta Lejon, purchased from Sweden and commissioned into the Chilean Navy in 1971, decommissioned in 1984, and scrapped in 1986
- Chilean destroyer Almirante Latorre, a County-class destroyer, the former HMS Glamorgan (D19), commissioned into the Chilean Navy in 1986, decommissioned in 1998, and sunk en route for scrapping in 2005
- Chilean frigate Almirante Latorre (2005) FFG-14, a Jacob van Heemskerck-class frigate, the former HNLMS Jacob van Heemskerck (F812), was sold to Chile in 2005
- Chilean frigate Almirante Latorre (2020) FFG-14, an Adelaide-class frigate, the former HMAS Melbourne transferred to Chile in 2020
