= Battle of Angamos =

1879 naval battle during the War of the Pacific

- Part of the War of the Pacific
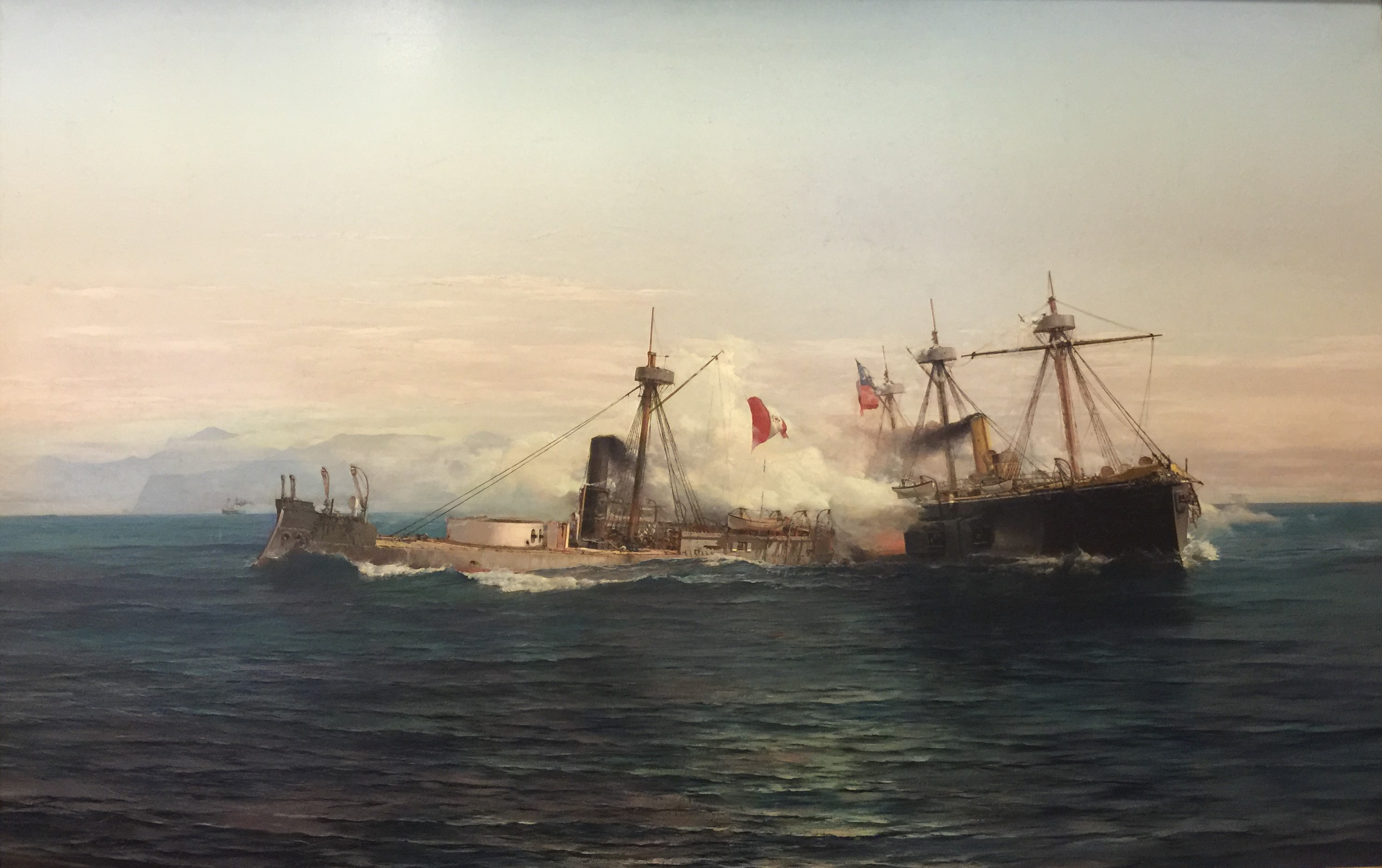
- Naval combat during the Battle of Angamos.
Date	8 October 1879
Location	Near Mejillones, Antofagasta in Bolivia (present day Chile) 23°S 71°W
Result	Chilean victory

Belligerents
Chile	Peru

Commanders and leaders
(Chile) Juan José Latorre (Chile) Galvarino Cárdenas	(Peru) Miguel Grau †

Strength
2 armoured frigates 2 corvettes 2 transports	1 monitor 1 corvette

Casualties and losses
1 killed 9 wounded	31 killed 4 missing 162 captured 1 ironclad captured
- Location within Chile Battle of Angamos (South America) Battle of Angamos (America)

The Battle of Angamos (Spanish: Combate Naval de Angamos) was a naval encounter of the War of the Pacific fought between the navies of Chile and Perú at Punta Angamos, on 8 October 1879. The battle was the culminating point of a naval campaign that lasted about five months in which the Chilean Navy had the sole mission of eliminating its Peruvian counterpart. In the struggle, two armored frigates, led by Commodore Galvarino Riveros Cárdenas and Navy Captain Juan José Latorre battered and later captured the Peruvian monitor Huáscar, under Rear Admiral Miguel Grau Seminario.

After the loss of the frigate Independencia at Punta Gruesa, Grau sought to challenge the outnumbering Chilean fleet with a harassing strategy, focused on inflicting as much damage as possible while avoiding a full-scale engagement. As Grau moved along the Pacific coast, he was chased by Admiral John Williams Rebolledo, who had been ordered to catch Grau no matter what. His failure cost him his commission, and was replaced by Riveros.

With a different strategy, Riveros managed to encircle Grau at Punta Angamos, about 80 kilometers north of Antofagasta. Falling in a trap set by Riveros and Latorre, Grau was forced to present battle after ordering the corvette Unión to escape to Perú.

Latorre, aboard Almirante Cochrane, engaged first. Taking advantage of the powerful Armstrong-type batteries with armour-piercing projectiles, Latorre shelled Huáscar for almost two hours. The monitor Huascar, with only ordinary elongated shot, could cause little damage to the Chilean ironclads and Grau was killed in action. However, his flagship continued the fight, while Riveros engaged her with the Blanco Encalada as well. After being battered for almost three hours, the Huáscar, unable to sustain combat, was boarded and captured and the battle ended.

The result was a complete success for the Chilean Navy, and secured its dominant position for the rest of the war. It allowed to prepare the invasion of the Tarapacá department, carried out on early November.

Chilean Navy dominance off the Pacific coast contributed significantly to success in the following land campaigns across the Atacama Desert that ended with Lima's fall in January 1881.

The Huáscar was repaired and served under the Chilean flag until its decommission, and now sits as a floating museum in the port of Talcahuano.

== Background ==
After the naval battle of Iquique of 21 May, the Peruvian fleet lost the armored frigate Independencia to a wooden schooner, Covadonga. This obliged Rear Admiral Miguel Grau to renounce to attack and to adopt a harassing strategy, avoiding by all means a direct encounter with the bulk of the Chilean navy.

Aboard the monitor Huáscar, Grau made several incursions into Chilean waters, successfully challenging the enemy's domination along the coast. Under his command, Huáscar sank or captured 14 transports, one of them carrying an entire cavalry regiment.

This last setback was considered a humiliation by the Chilean public opinion, and sparked several protests against the government. Besides, the Commander of the Chilean fleet Juan Williams Rebolledo resigned on 5 August. His poor command left his ships incapable of sailing without important repairs. The Chileans lost almost a month restoring the vessels to combat condition again. Therefore, the newly appointed Commander of the Navy, Commodore Galvarino Riveros Cárdenas, couldn't sail until September.

By 30 September, Riveros was notified that the corvette Unión was sailing to Panamá to escort five small ships with torpedoes bought from the United States. The Chilean fleet sailed again on 1 October, now carrying War Minister Rafael Sotomayor. The preceding week, the government had ordered the fleet to hunt down the Huáscar at all cost. In a council held aboard Riveros' flagship, the armored frigate Blanco Encalada, it was decided to set course to Arica, hoping to find Huáscar there.

But, on 7 October, Riveros was informed that Grau had been sighted sailing north at Coquimbo, halfway between Arica and Valparaíso. Therefore, a new strategy was set up to capture the Peruvian monitor.

Divided in two divisions, Riveros with the slower ships would move close to shore, while Latorre would sail about 35 km from shore with the faster ships. So, the fleet was divided as it follows:

- 1st Division—Commodore Galvarino Riveros Cárdenas.
  - Armored frigate Blanco Encalada: Commodore Galvarino Riveros Cárdenas
  - Wooden schooner Virgen de Covadonga: Lt. Captain Manuel Orella
  - Transport Matias Cousiño : Lt. Captain Augusto Castleton.
- 2nd Division—Commander Juan Jose Latorre
  - Armored frigate Almirante Cochrane : Commander Juan Jose Latorre
  - Corvette O'Higgins : Lt. Captain Jorge Montt Alvarez
  - Gunned Transport Loa : Lt. Captain Javier Molinas Gacitua.

=== Chilean strategy ===
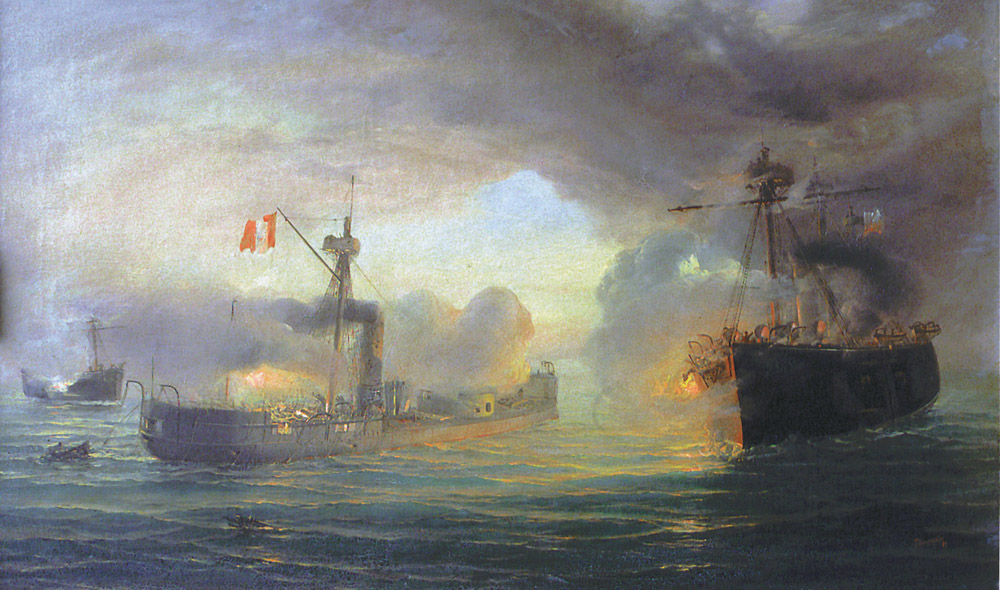
Naval Combat of Angamos by Thomas Somerscales

On 1 October, Riveros gathered his officers and communicated the order of hunting down the Peruvian vessel at Arica. The same day, Grau in his flagship Huáscar ordered to sail along the coast as far south as Coquimbo, accompanied by the corvette Unión. Since the Chilean fleet sailed close to the shore and the Peruvians were farther out in the open sea, both formations didn't spot each other.

At Mejillones, on 7 October, a plan was approved to deceive the Peruvian ships. Riveros' division would wait for Grau at Antofagasta while Latorre would set up an east–west barrier-like formation about twenty miles (32 km) from shore. If Riveros could spot Huáscar, he would follow and keep her from retreating to south until Latorre could engage.

During the night the Peruvian warships were sailing off the Chilean coast to Arica, when they saw the lights of Antofagasta. Admiral Grau decided to engage any Chilean vessel at the port, intending to inflict some damage.

At 01:10 h. on 8 October, Huáscar searched the bay without encountering any targets. She came up with Unión at 03:00 hrs, and both resumed their northward heading. At the same hour, lookouts on Blanco Encalada saw two smoke columns on the horizon. Simultaneously, Grau was informed that there were three smoke columns to north.

Both enemies spotted each other and the Peruvian ships turned back south. Riveros ordered a speed reduction of his to make Grau think it was possible to turn back north and sail for Perú. At 05:40 h., both Peruvian ships began to slowly turn once again north. Then, Riveros increased the speed of Blanco Encalada to get closer to the Peruvians and to discourage Grau from turning back south.

At 07:15 hrs, steaming northward, the two Peruvian vessels spotted smoke columns ahead; it was the incoming Latorre's division. Since the Peruvian Unión could manage 13 knots, she was able to sail northeastward and escape, but the Huáscar had to maintain course and fight.

== The Struggle ==
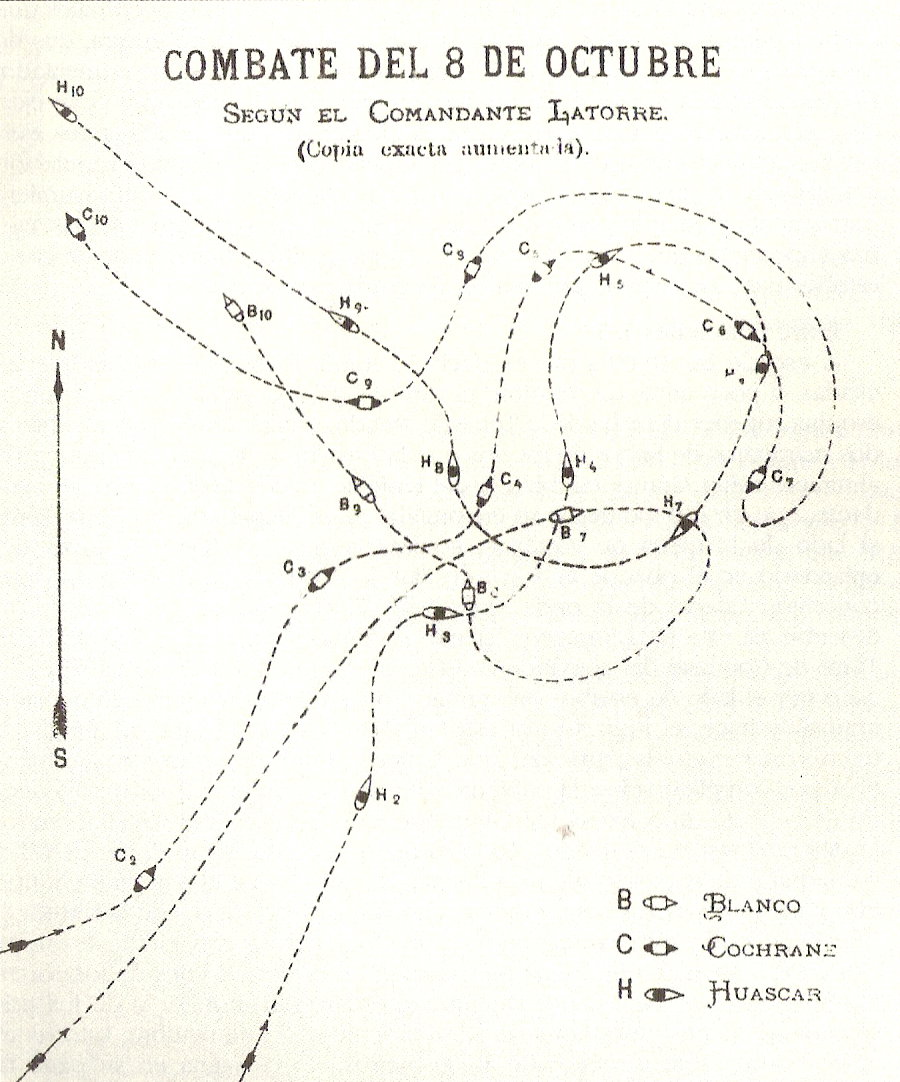
Drawing of the Battle of Angamos

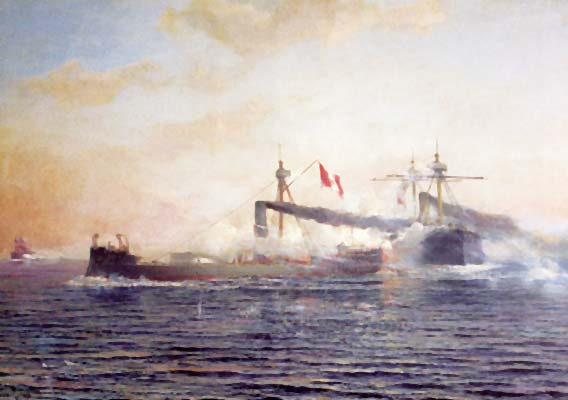
Battle of Angamos

Around 8:30 h, the gap between Huáscar and Blanco Encalada reduced to 3,000 meters, and after Latorre modified his route, Cochrane was closing in too.

Off Punta Angamos at 09:25 h. Grau opened fire over Cochrane, beginning the engagement. Latorre didn't answer, focused on approaching to Huáscar from its stern. About 15 minutes later, Cochrane retaliated from about 2,200 meters. Her three starboard cannons caused serious damage to the monitor right from the start. The very first shot pierced Huáscar's turret, wounding the twelve crew members manning the 300-pound cannons. Another shot perforated the armor just above the waterline, cutting the left rudder chain and leaving Huáscar temporarily adrift. Meanwhile, Cochrane sustained little damage. Grau's flagship listed hard to starboard and was hampered also by a deformation in the hull acquired when she rammed Prat's Esmeralda at Iquique five months ago. However, barely ten minutes later an emergency rudder was set up by Huáscar's crew.

At 10:00 h, a shot from Cochrane struck the bridge cabin, killing Admiral Grau and his adjutant, Diego Ferre. Command fell to Captain Elías Aguirre. By this time Huáscar's stern was on fire since at least two more shells penetrated from the rear and shattered the rudder wheel (Cluny, pg. 230), and the forecastle was devastated too. Lt. Captain Gaona's gunners caused heavy casualties among the Peruvian crew: the Chileans were using Palliser type armor-piercing rounds, which exploded right after penetrating the hull.

At 10:10, the Huáscar's flag was brought down from its hoist by the intense gunfire. Latorre ordered a cease fire, thinking that the ship had surrendered. However, the monitor kept up its pace and within minutes an unidentified officer hoisted the flag again, resuming combat. Meanwhile, the crew of the Huascar had again repaired the rudder wheel.

At 10:22 hrs, Blanco Encalada arrived to the fray. A shot from 200 meters perforated the Huascar's turret, killing almost all of the sailors within and damaging the rightmost cannon. Another shot from Cochrane passed through the officers' quarters and wrecked the emergency rudder station, which had been disabled already twice before. The Huáscar now could sail only in a wide semicircle to starboard. Once rudder control was regained, Aguirre tried to ram the Cochrane. Latorre was also maneuvering to ram the Huáscar, but the Peruvian ironclad suddenly veered to port and both ships passed by each other. Another projectile pierced Huáscar's turret 12 minutes later, killing everyone inside, including Captain Aguirre. Command of the ship went to Lt. Pedro Garezon, who in conference with the remaining officers decided to scuttle the ship rather than allow it to be captured. At 10:54 hrs the order was given to evacuate the wounded from the engine room and open the main condensator to scuttle the ship and to prevent its capture.

At 10:55 hrs Huáscar's flag chain was caught (a second time) by the intense gunfire. The Chilean warships, noticing that the Huáscar was decreasing speed, mustered their boarding parties. At 11:08 hrs, 14 to 20 sailors boarded the Huáscar, without resistance. They closed the main condensator water leaks (with 1.2 meters of water in the engine room) and extinguished several fires while the prisoners were transported to the Chilean vessels. Acting commander Pedro Garezon pointed out to the Chilean officers that the flag was on deck together with the chain because they had all been cut off by the enemy shots, thus the flag was never brought down, nor had the ship been surrendered by the Peruvians. One of the Chilean officers observed that something similar happened to the Chilean ship Magallanes.

== Consequences ==
With this combat, the Chilean navy eliminated the menace of the Peruvian fleet. With Huáscar's capture, plus the previous loss of Independencia at Punta Gruesa, the firepower of the Peruvian Navy was drastically reduced, and Chile incorporated the monitor in its fleet. The loss of both vessels, plus the death of Admiral Grau, Peruvians' best naval officer, gave the Chilean navy uncontested control of the Pacific coast of Peru bringing the naval campaign of the War of the Pacific to its end. The decisive victory at Angamos allowed the Chilean Army to freely pursue the plan to attack the Allies, and the land invasion of Peru began.

At the same time, it prevented the allies from carrying out concentrations and resupplying of their armies in southern Peru,. Nor would Peru or Bolivia have the possibility of initiating a land attack on the Chilean forces in Antofagasta because it could not supply them by sea.

Technical learnings:

- Effectiveness of the design of armored ships having rotating turrets with large caliber guns as the main weapon.
- The 250 pound Palliser Ammunition had devastating effects against the "Huáscar". It was the first combat use of such anti-armor projectiles.
- Reports on the combat appeared in various European and American magazines.

The Battle of Angamos is commemorated with an annual public holiday in Peru.

== External links (in Spanish) ==
- Battle of Tarapaca: Brief synopsis (in Spanish, from Website of Peruvian military central command)
- The Forgotten Heroes
- The Chilean Navy
- Battle of Pisagua (Wikipedia: Spanish)
