= Battle of Chipana =

- Part of the War of the Pacific
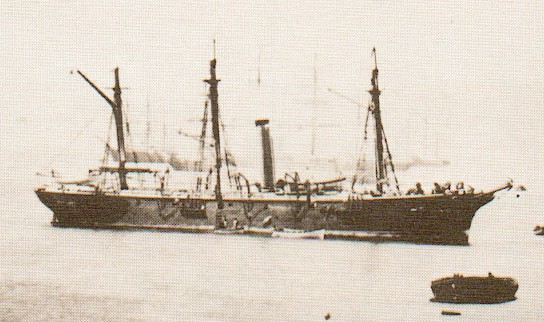
- Chilean corvette Magallanes
Date	12 April 1879
Location	Off Huanillos, Bolivia (present day Chile)
Result	Inconclusive

Belligerents
Chile	Peru

Commanders and leaders
(Chile) Juan José Latorre	(Peru) A. García y García

Strength
1 corvette	1 corvette 1 gunboat

Casualties and losses
None	None

The Battle of Chipana took place on 12 April 1879, during the War of the Pacific between Chile and Peru. It was the first naval engagement between both navies and took place in front of Huanillos, off the (then) Bolivian coast, as the Peruvian corvette Unión and gunboat Pilcomayo found the Chilean corvette Magallanes on its way to Iquique.

For a while, the Unión was subjected to cross fire, then the Pilcomayo suffered boiler trouble, and dropped out of the battle. After a two-hour running artillery duel, Unión suffered engine problems, the pursuit was called off. Magallanes escaped with minor damage and had completed part of its mission, delivering commissioned papers to Iquique, but could not complete its reconnaissance mission of finding if any guano ships were still trading in the zone.

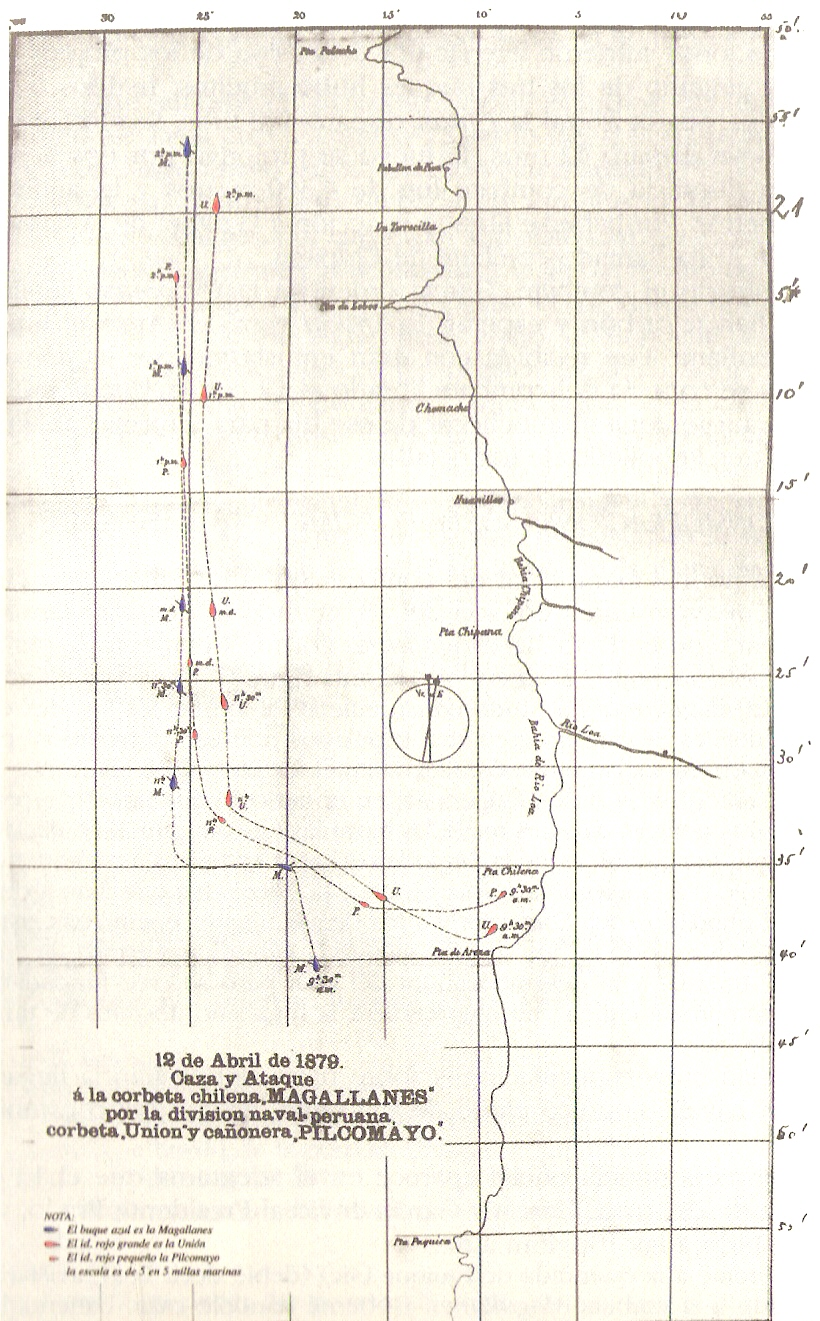
There were no injuries on either side.
