= Juan José Latorre =

Chilean Vice Admiral and politician

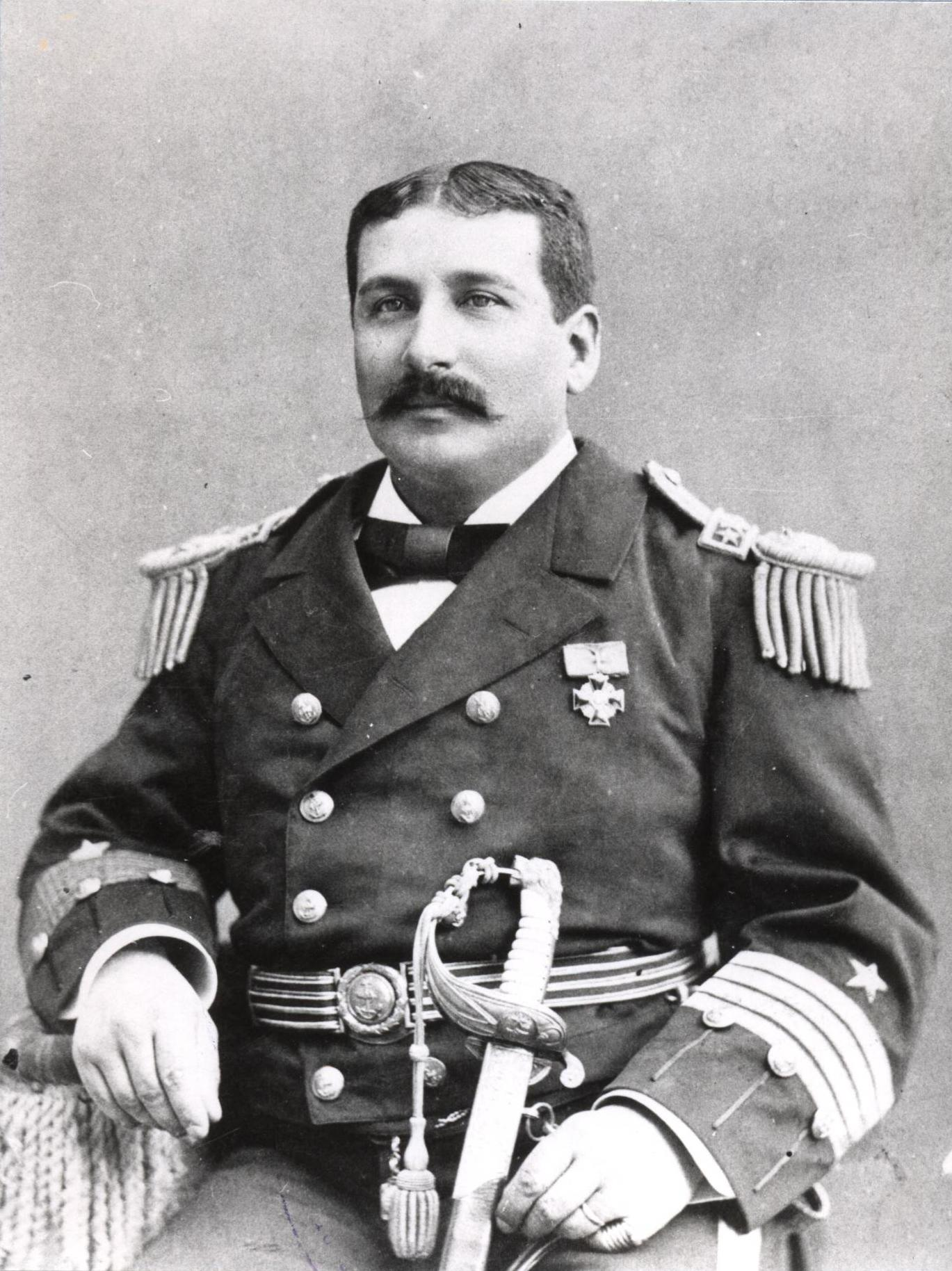
- Photography by Latorre.
- Born: March 24, 1846; Santiago, Chile
- Died: July 9, 1912 (aged 66); Viña del Mar, Chile
- Burial place: General Cemetery of Santiago
- Spouse: Julia Moreno Zuleta
- Children: Arturo, Juan José, Mercedes, María Luisa and Marta
- Relatives: Elías Latorre (father); Nicomedia Benavente (mother)
- Military career
- Allegiance: Chile
- Branch: Chilean Navy
- Service years: 1861–1891;1897
- Rank: Vice Admiral
- Commands: Commander of the squad (1882); Commander in Chief of the Chilean Navy (1886-1887)
- Conflicts: Chincha Islands War; Battle of Papudo; Battle of Abtao; War of the Pacific; Battle of Chipana; Battle of Angamos
- Other work: Politician

Juan José Latorre Benavente (Santiago; March 24, 1846 – July 9, 1912) Chilean Vice Admiral, one of the principal actors of the War of the Pacific, and hero of the Battle of Angamos.

== Early life ==
Son of Elías Latorre and of Nicomedia Benavente, the oldest of eight brothers. After the early death of his father, three of his younger brothers were taken by the paternal family in Peru, where they were raised. Later on, one of the brothers participated also in the War of the Pacific, but on the Peruvian side.

At the age of nine, in 1855, he won a scholarship to the Naval Academy. Appointed midshipman on July 15, 1861. He served on the Esmeralda during the Chincha Islands War and participated in the Battle of Papudo, where the Spanish schooner Covadonga was captured, and in the Battle of Abtao.

On February 12, 1873 was promoted to first lieutenant, and given command of the Toltén first, and the Magallanes later. It was in this later ship that he was going to make his name as one of the ablest naval commanders of the coming war. During his patrols of the extreme southern region of Chile, he was involved in a diplomatic incident with Argentina and Britain, when he captured several foreign ships that were operating in the Chilean area with an Argentinian licence, chief among them the Jeanne Amelie and the Devonshire. He was also faced with the mutiny of the city of Punta Arenas, where he was able to rescue his old friend, governor Diego Dublé Almeida.

== War of the Pacific years ==
=== Naval Battle de Chipana ===
While in command of the Magallanes, he was the first to come face to face with the Peruvian navy at the Battle of Chipana. On April 12, 1879, he crossed paths with the Peruvian warships Unión and Pilcomayo that tried to capture his vessel. Outgunned, Latorre decided to escape. During the ensuing pursuit, he noticed that the speed of the two Peruvian ships was greatly different, and that the Pilcomayo was falling considerably behind.

Once the Peruvian Unión was alone, he turned his ship around, and opened fire. The battle thus ensued. The Peruvian aim was very poor, due to their lack of training, but the Chilean aim was only marginally better. At one point, the Unión started spewing white smoke from one of its sides. This led the Peruvian captain to think his ship had been seriously hit, and gave up the pursuit, allowing the weaker Magallanes to escape unharmed. In fact the whole incident was caused by the overheating of one of the boilers.

=== Second Naval Battle of Iquique ===
After the disastrous reduction of the Peruvian navy at the First Naval Battle of Iquique, presidente Prado of Peru ordered Admiral Grau to harass the Chilean shipping lines and to try to disrupt their commerce. The Admiral, on the Huáscar, decided to go on a night raid to the port of Iquique, to try and destroy the Abtao. He arrived on the night of July 9, and not finding his prey decided to go after the transport ship Matías Cousiño.

Latorre, who was commanding the Magallanes decided to fend off the attack, in spite of the difference in strength of both ships (260 tons versus 1130). Admiral Grau tried to sink the smaller ship thrice, using his ram, but in spite of his ability the Magallanes was able to keep him at bay long enough for the ironclad Cochrane to show up, after which the Huascar decided to retreat back to Arica.

=== Naval Battle of Angamos ===
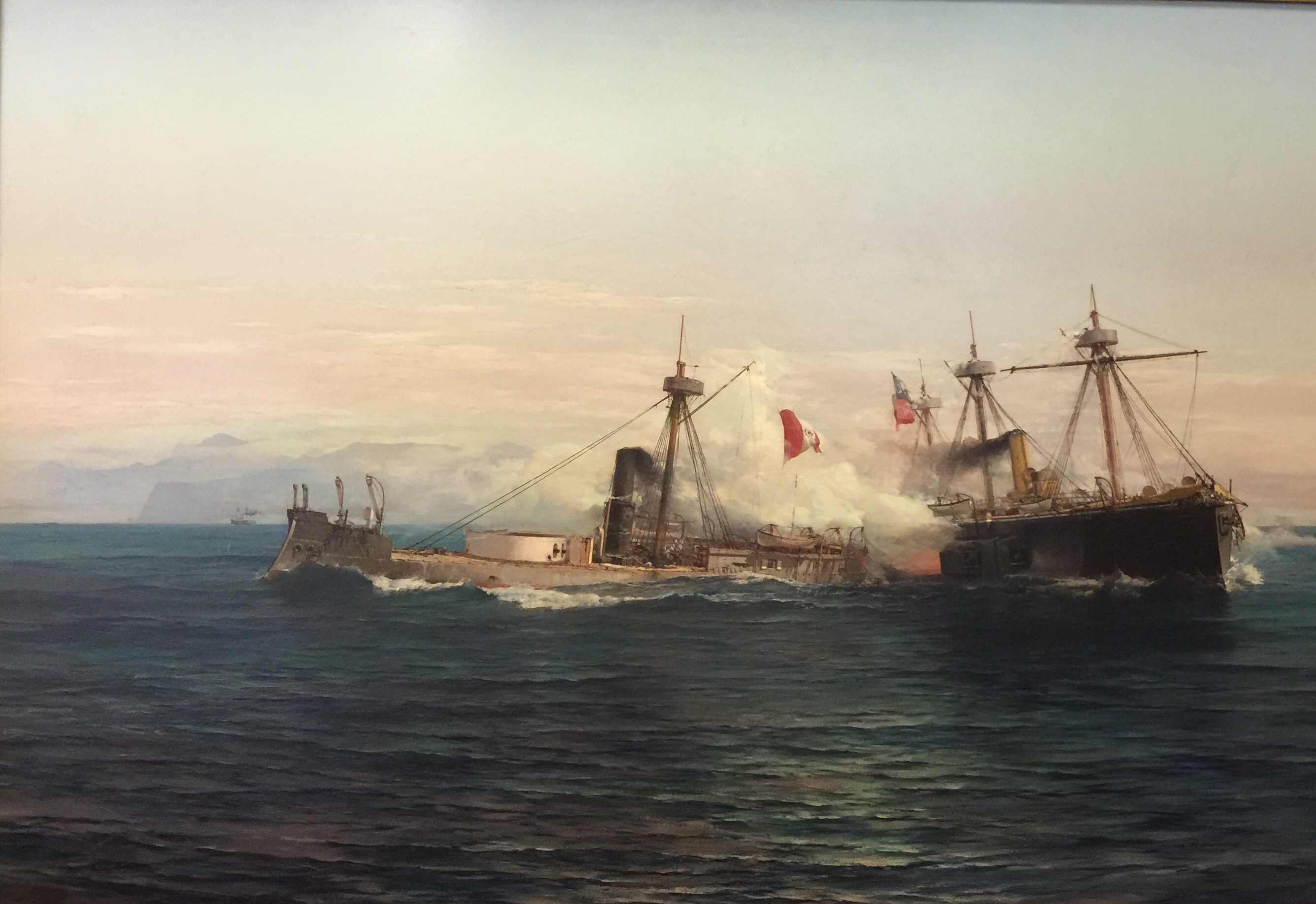
Naval Battle of Angamos

On September 6, 1879 Latorre was promoted to commander of the ironclad Cochrane, the strongest unit of the Chilean fleet. His fame was such that he brought his entire crew with him. His first mission was to eliminate the threat of the Huáscar, which was the sole impediment to an invasion of the Peruvian coastline.

On the night of October 7 he was informed that the Huáscar had been seen near the port of Huasco and was moving north. A trap was then set. The Chilean fleet was divided into two groups. The first division was in charge of Commander Galvarino Riveros and made up of the Blanco Encalada, Covadonga and the collier Matías Cousiño. The first division would try to push Admiral Grau toward the second division that would be waiting further north. In the early hours of October 8 the plan went into effect. When the Huáscar and the Unión saw the Chilean ships blocking their way south they decided to turn back north. A few hours later they met the Cochrane which was waiting according to plan. Admiral Grau was forced to fight in the Battle of Angamos while the Unión got away.

The Cochrane continued advancing on the Huáscar without answering its fire until it was very close to its adversary, in order not to lose speed. When it finally attacked, the onslaught was ferocious. The second shot destroyed the command tower of the Huascar, killing Admiral Grau and leaving the monitor without a rudder. The fight continued for another hour, but the arrival of the Blanco Encalada with the rest of the Chilean fleet made any resistance totally hopeless. The Huáscar was captured and became a part of the Chilean fleet.

== Later years ==
After returning to Chile, in 1882 he married Julia Moreno Zuleta, whom he met on one of the many parties given in his honor after the war. They had three children. On June 5, 1884 he is promoted to Rear-Admiral. In 1886, he was appointed Commander General of the Navy. Presidente José Manuel Balmaceda sent him on an official mission to Europe to supervise the construction of new ships for the Chilean navy. While in England, the 1891 Chilean Civil War broke out. He chose to remain loyal to president Balmaceda and was dismissed after the Congressional triumph. He remained in exile in Europe until 1894.

After his return, he was twice elected senator for the Balmacedista party (1894-1900, 1900-1906), and was reinstated in the navy. He was appointed member of the Council of State by president Federico Errázuriz Echaurren in 1897 and minister of foreign affairs in 1898. A few years before his death he was promoted to vice admiral and was made a Commander of the French Legion of Honor.

== See also ==
- See Chilean ship Almirante Latorre for the ships named in honor of Juan José Latorre.

Political offices
Preceded by Raimundo Silva	Minister of Foreign Affairs, Cult and Colonization; 1898-1899	Succeeded by Ventura Blanco
Military offices
Preceded by Domingo Toro	Navy General Commander; 1886-1887	Succeeded by Luis Uribe
