= Chilean corvette Magallanes =

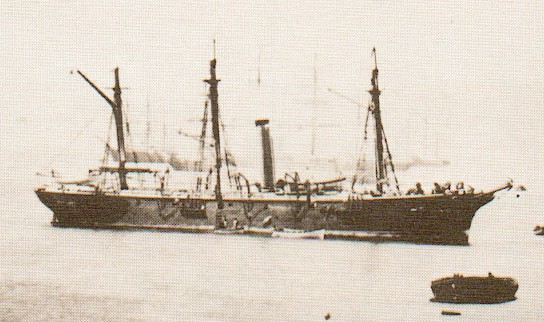
- Corvette Magallanes

History

Chile
- Name: Magallanes
- Ordered: by Law of 4 March 1872
- Builder: Raenhill & Co., London
- Launched: 28 July 1873
- Commissioned: 28 December 1874
- Fate: Sunk off Corral, Chile, 1907

General characteristics
- Displacement: 950 tons
- Length: 200 ft (61 m)
- Beam: 27 ft (8.2 m)
- Depth: 27 ft 6 in (8.38 m) (moulded depth)
- Propulsion: Compound steam engine, 2,230 hp (1,663 kW), 2 shafts
- Speed: 11.5 knots (21.3 km/h; 13.2 mph)
- Complement: 114 sailors and 24 marines
- Armament: 1 × 7 in (180 mm) gun; 1 × 64-pounder gun; 2 × 4 in (100 mm) guns

The corvette Magallanes was ordered by the Chilean government after the disastrous consequences of the War against Spain in 1864-1866 and the rising border conflict with the neighboring countries at the end of the 1870s.

== In the far southern region of Chile ==
In 1874 she was ordered to travel to the Strait of Magellan to produce charts of the Angostura Inglesa in the Messier Channel, and of the Bahia Possession in the strait.

In January 1876, during patrols off the far south of Chile and under the command of Juan José Latorre, the French ship Jeanne Amelie was seized off the coast of Rio Negro as they loaded guano without a Chilean license. By the attempt to bring the ship to Punta Arenas, the Jeanne Amelie sank on 27 April 1876 at the eastern entrance of the Strait of Magellan. Later the American ship Devonshire was also seized.

In 1877, also under the command of Juan José Latorre, the crew of the corvette put down "El motín de los artilleros" ("The Mutiny of the Artillerymen") and restored the rule of law in Punta Arenas. In July 1878, Magallanes was despatched from Punta Arenas to Melville Sound to tow the British barque Kate Kellock, which had been struck by a wave and severely damaged, in to Punta Arenas. The two ships arrived there on 2 August.

== War of the Pacific ==
The Magallanes was a protagonist of the Battle of Chipana in April 1879, the first naval battle of the war. In September 1879 she was refitted in Valparaíso and Carlos Condell took the command of the ship. In November she was involved in the amphibious assault on the port of Pisagua.

== Civil War of 1891 ==
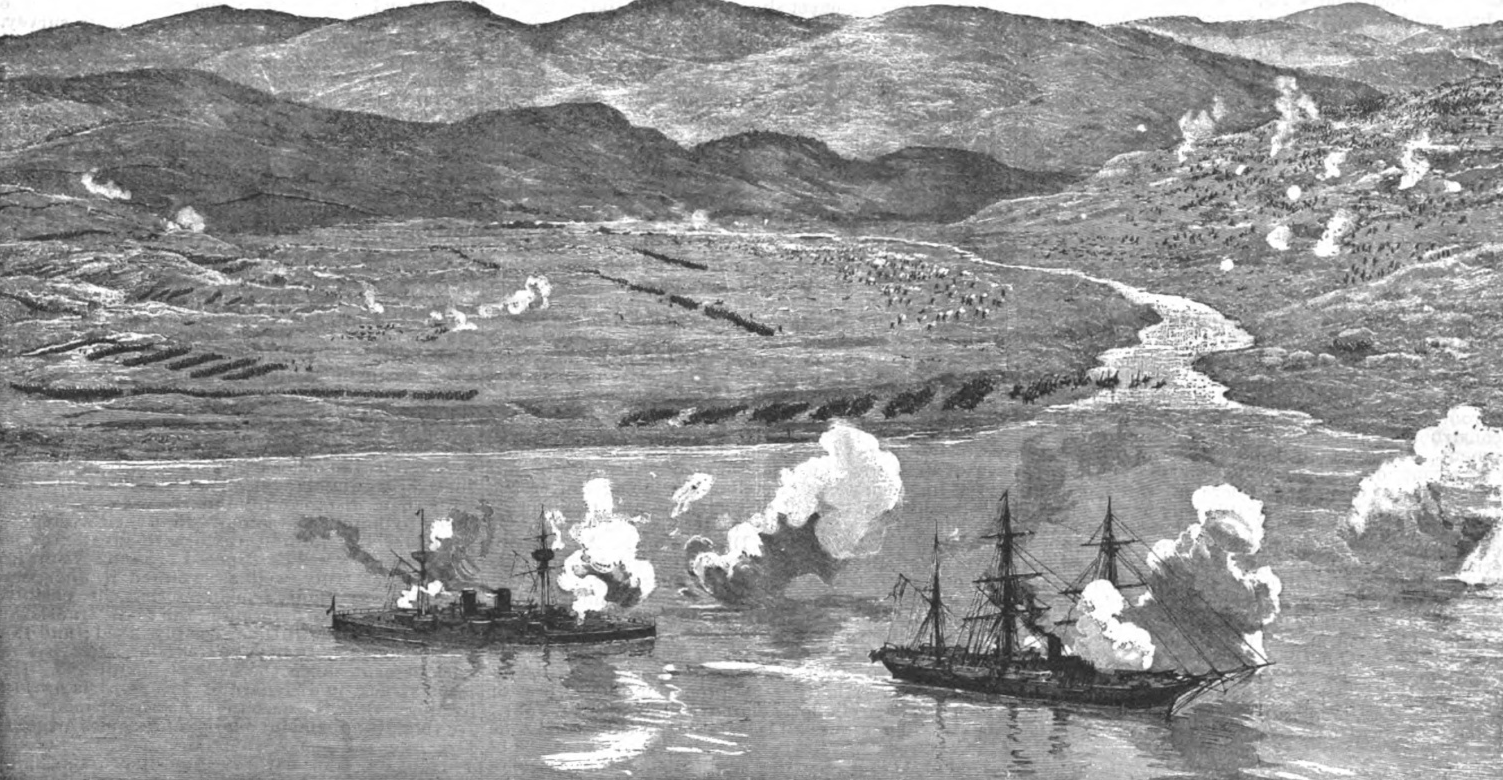
Illustration showing the cruiser Esmeralda with the corvette Magallanes covering the advance of the Congressionalist forces during the Battle of Concón

During the civil war of 1891 she sided with the Junta of Iquique.

In 1906 the ship was decommissioned, handed over to the Merchant Navy. In 1907 she sank off Corral.

Corvette Magallanes during the War of the Pacific

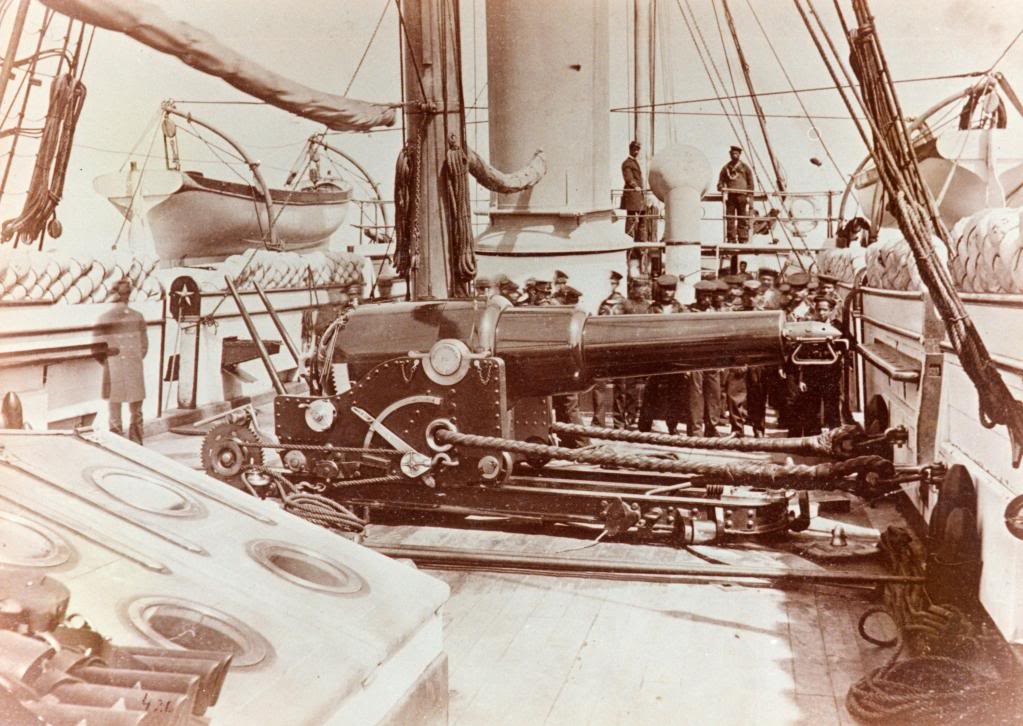
The main gun, an Armstrong 115-pounder

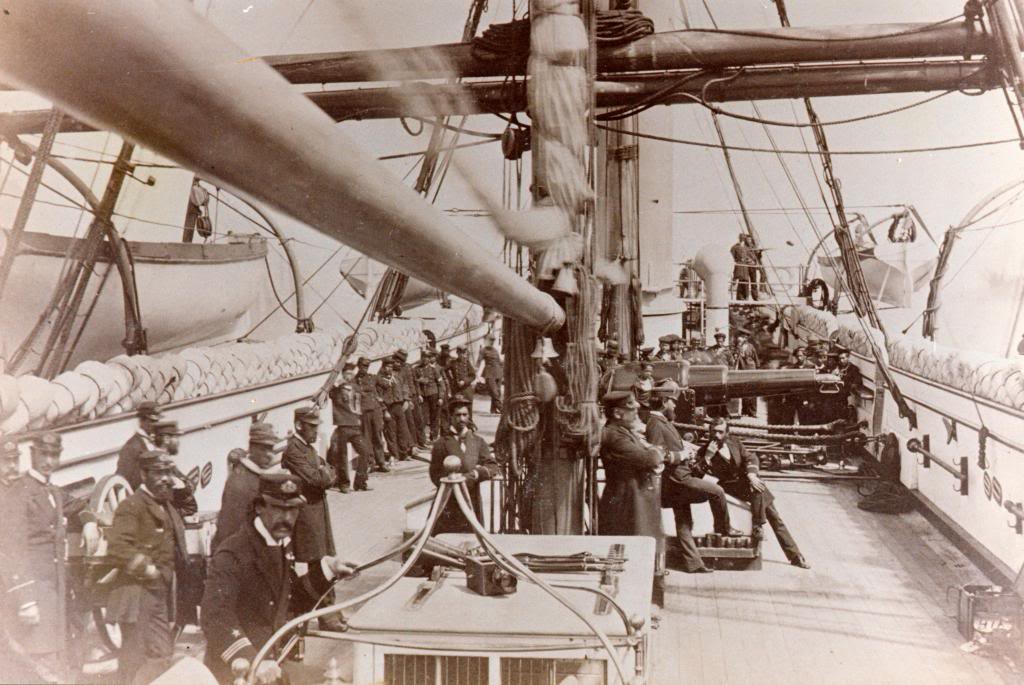
Deck

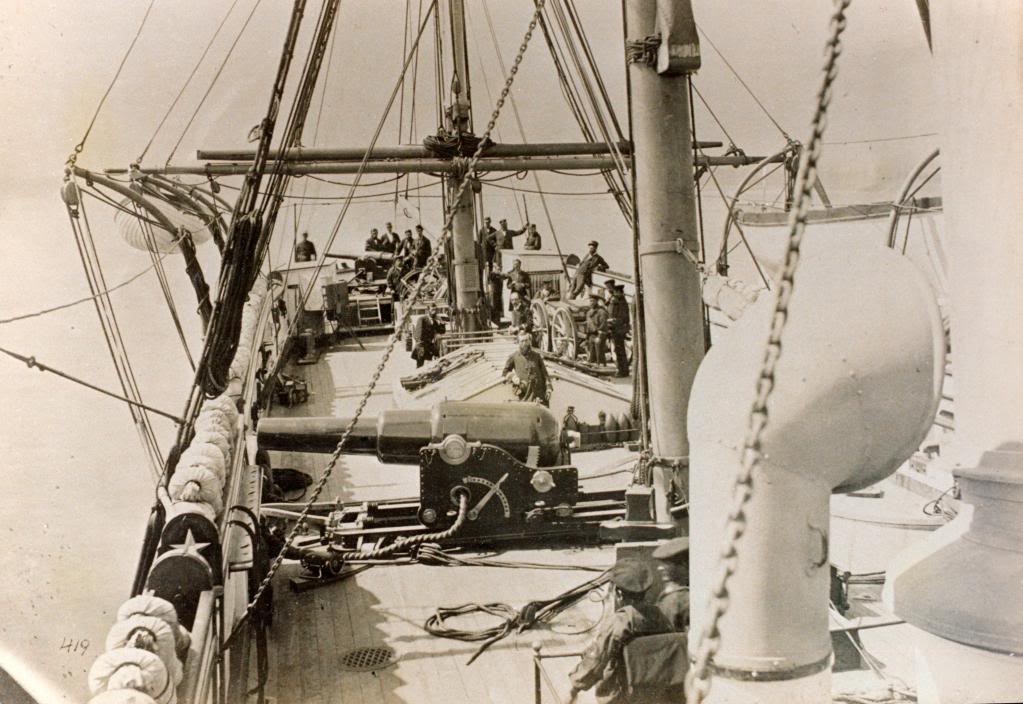
Deck

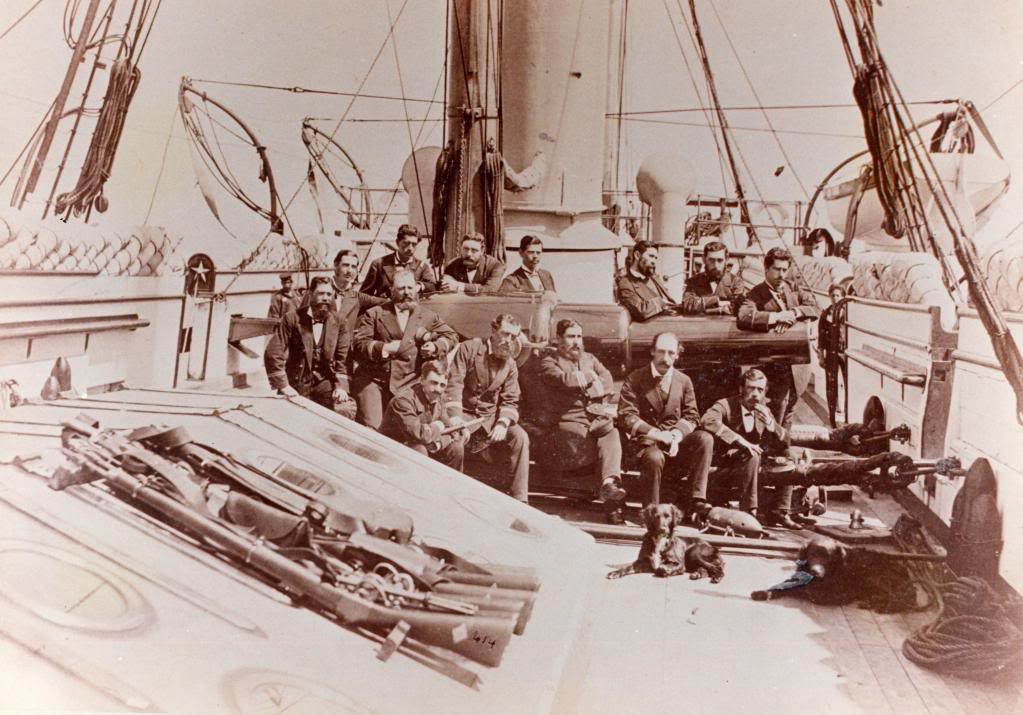
Officers of the Chilean ship Magallanes

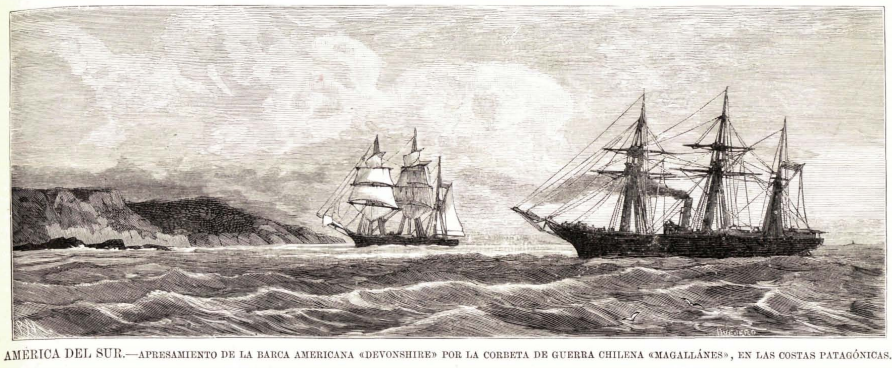
Capture of the US Devonshire by the Magallanes

== See also ==
- List of decommissioned ships of the Chilean Navy
- Naval Campaign of the War of the Pacific
