= Huanillos =

Coordinates: 21.20027032439648°S 70.093403718619°W

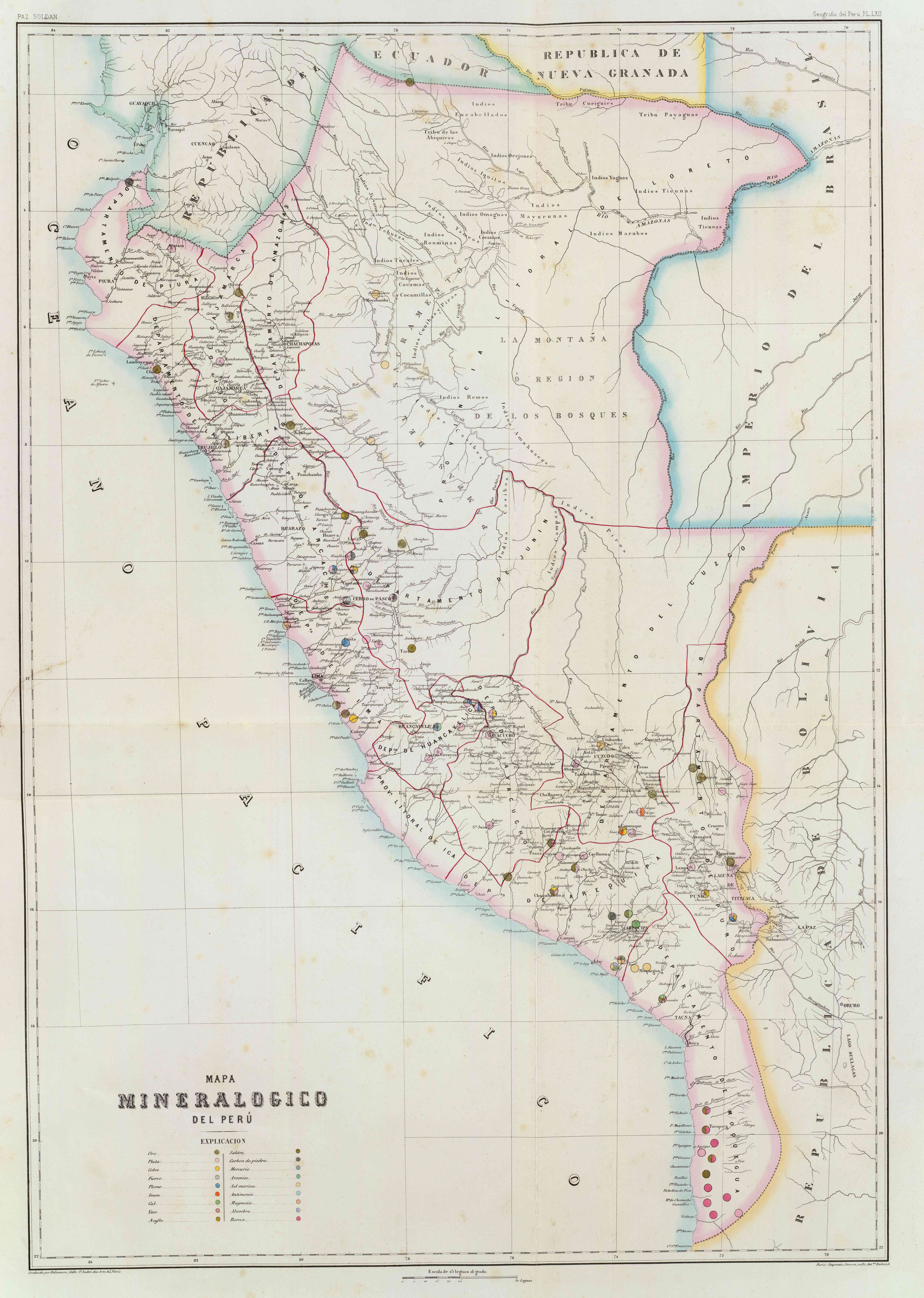
Huanillos, or "Guanillos" on an 1865 map of Peru

Huanillos, sometimes Guanillos, is located in the shore of the region of Tarapaca, Chile. It is 130 km south from Iquique, the capital of the region. It was historically one of the main locations in Chile where guano deposits could be found.

== History ==
Huanillos was one of the most important sources of guano. Guano is seabird excrement and it was used as a fertilizer in the 19th century in the Peruvian country. It was discovered by Alexander Von Humboldt, a German naturalist who studied the flora and fauna of South America. Between 1845 and 1851 Huanillos was surveyed by a Peruvian engineer who was sent by the government, until 1879 the border between Peru and Bolivia was located near the Bolivian city of Antofagasta, Chile took over this territory after the Pacific War.

== Founding ==
The extraction of guano was approved by the Peruvian government in 1874, and with that the creation of the new village called Huanillos. It had a population of 825 people, 729 men and 96 women. Huanillos was a complex village, with hotels, a court house, shops, offices, and houses for the workers. There were three different types of workers; Peruvians, Chileans and coolies, or Chinese slaves. They worked mainly in the extraction of guano.

== Coolies ==
Chinese coolie were very common in that time because in 1850 the Peruvian government made a trade agreement with China; the Peruvian government would give 50 soles per Chinese coolie who worked in Huanillo's different industries. However, the Chinese people, especially men, were treated so badly that a large number of them committed suicide and the few who survived were rescued by Patricio Lynch, a Chilean military officer who fought in the War of the Pacific.

== Present day ==
Nowadays, Huanillos is a ghost town, a place full of memories and stories from the past; one of those stories is a mysterious castle. Named "Garcia-Burr Castle", nobody knows when it was built, and some believe that the castle is no more than 100 years old. The only records pertaining to the construction and ownership of the castle is that it was built by Freddy Campaña.

== See also ==
- Caracoles, Antofagasta
- Cobija, Chile
- Tocopilla
- Mejillones
