= Chilean corvette O'Higgins =

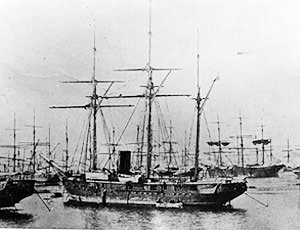
- Corvette O'Higgins

History

Naval Jack of Chile
- Name: O'Higgins
- Namesake: Bernardo O'Higgins
- Builder: Ravenhill, London, United Kingdom
- Cost: $ 286.000 ($1 = 48pennies)
- Launched: 1866
- Commissioned: 1868
- Decommissioned: 1895
- Fate: Pontoon until 1905

General characteristics
- Class & type: Corvette
- Displacement: 1101
- Length: 216 ft 6 in (66.0 m)
- Beam: 33 ft 4 in (10.2 m)
- Draught: 18 ft 0 in (5.5 m)
- Installed power: 1.200 HP
- Propulsion: Maudsley return connecting rod engine
- Speed: 9 kn
- Complement: 200
- Armament: 3 Armstrong guns 7 in, 2 guns 70 lb, 4 guns 40 lb

In 1864 the Chilean government ordered the construction of two corvettes in Ravenhill, the O'Higgins and the Chacabuco. Both corvettes were seized by the British authorities in order to enforce a neutrality provision in the impending state of war between Chile and Spain (Chincha Islands War, 1864-1866). In 1866 the countries reached an agreement in which Chile received the corvettes and Spain the ships Arapiles and Victoria.

In 1869, under the command of Manuel Blanco Encalada, the remains of Bernardo O'Higgins, first buried in Peru, were repatriated to Chile on board of the frigate that bore his name.

In 1870, the O'Higgins went to Easter Island and performed the first topographic survey and scientific description of the island and acquired Rongorongo text I, the Santiago Staff.

The ship had an active role in the Naval Campaign of the War of the Pacific under the command of Jorge Montt and participated in the Capture of the Huáscar off Punta de Angamos.

During the 1891 Chilean Civil War the O'Higgins sided with the congress.

== See also ==
- List of decommissioned ships of the Chilean Navy
