= Vice Admiral of Chile =

Vice Admiral of Chile was the title given to the Commander-in-Chief of the Chilean Navy. One of the first Vice Admirals was Thomas Cochrane, 10th Earl of Dundonald, appointed in late 1818 to serve under Chile's leader Bernardo O'Higgins.
