= Chilean ironclad Blanco Encalada =

1875 Almirante Cochrane-class central battery ship

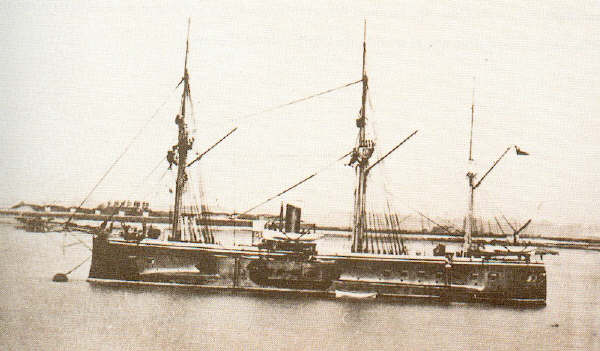
- Blanco Encalada

History

Chile
- Name: Valparaíso
- Namesake: Manuel Blanco Encalada
- Builder: Earle's Shipbuilding Co., Hull
- Laid down: 1873
- Launched: 8 May 1875
- Completed: 1875
- Renamed: Blanco Encalada (1876)
- Fate: Sunk by torpedo, 23 April 1891

General characteristics
- Class & type: Almirante Cochrane-class central battery ship
- Displacement: 3,480 long tons (3,540 t)
- Length: 210 ft (64.0 m)
- Beam: 46 ft 9 in (14.2 m)
- Draught: 19 ft 8 in (6.0 m)
- Installed power: 3,000 ihp (2,200 kW)
- Propulsion: 2 shafts, 2 Trunk steam engines; 6 cylindrical boilers
- Sail plan: Barque rig
- Speed: 12 knots (22 km/h; 14 mph)
- Range: 1,200 nmi (2,200 km; 1,400 mi) at 10 knots (19 km/h; 12 mph)
- Complement: 300
- Armament: 6 × 9 in (229 mm) muzzle-loading rifles; 1 × 20-pounder gun; 1 × 9-pounder gun; 1 × 7-pounder gun
- Armour: Belt: 4.5–9 in (114–229 mm); Battery: 6–8 in (152–203 mm); Deck: 2–3 in (51–76 mm); Conning tower: 4.5 in (114 mm); Bulkheads: 6 in (152 mm)

Blanco Encalada was an Almirante Cochrane–class central battery ship built by Earle's Shipbuilding in Hull, England, and commissioned into the Chilean Navy in 1875. Nicknamed El Blanco, she served prominently during the War of the Pacific. She participated in the capture of the Peruvian monitor Huáscar during the Battle of Angamos.

Blanco Encalada formed part of the congressional forces that brought down President José Manuel Balmaceda in the Chilean Civil War of 1891. She was sunk during that conflict on 23 April 1891, becoming the first ironclad warship to be sunk by a self-propelled torpedo.

== Background ==
In 1871 the president of Chile, Federico Errázuriz Zañartu, sent the Congress a bill to authorize the executive to acquire two armored warships. The bill, which was approved only by a vote of no confidence, stipulated that both vessels would be mid-sized frigates and would not cost more than 2 million pesos.

== Construction and commissioning ==
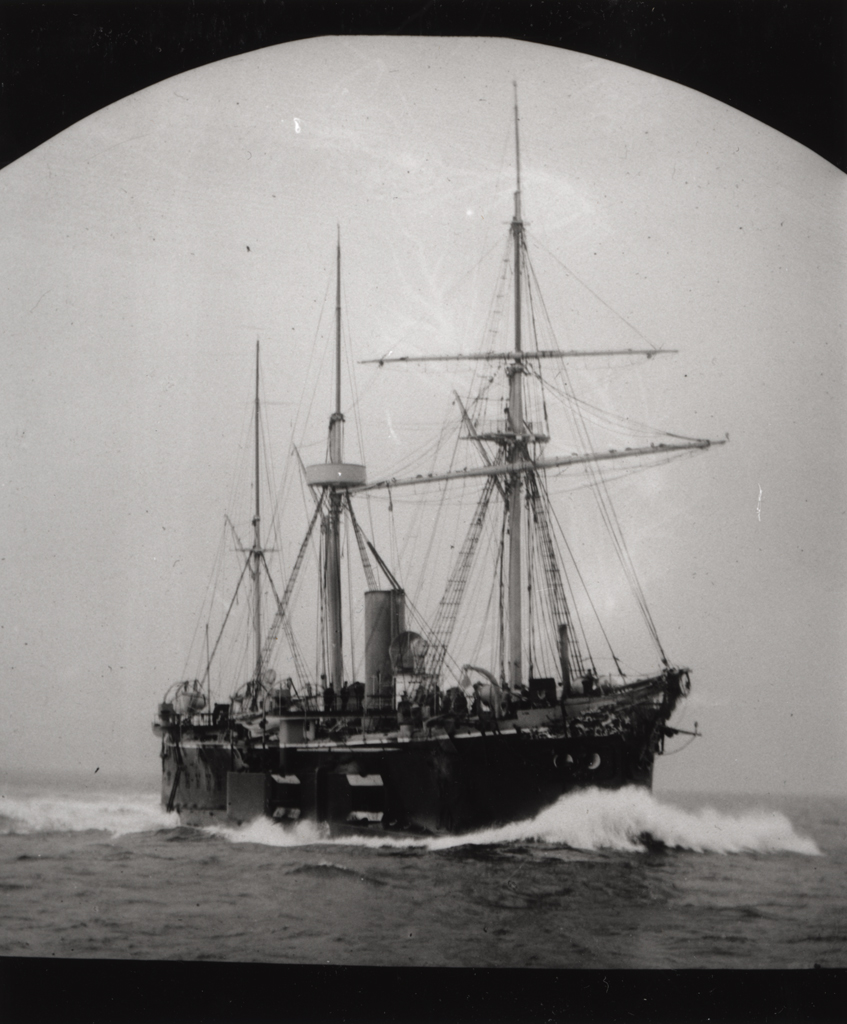
Blanco Encalada steaming around 1885

Ambassador Alberto Blest Gana oversaw the project and engaged former British Admiralty naval architect Edward James Reed as technical advisor. Blest Gana contracted Earle's Shipbuilding Co. in Hull, Yorkshire to carry out the construction.

The two ships were named Cochrane and Valparaíso but later, upon arrival at port on 24 January 1876, Valparaíso was renamed Blanco Encalada by the decree of the Minister of War and Navy on 15 September 1876. This was in honor of the admiral and first president of the Republic of Chile, Manuel Blanco Encalada. The construction of Blanco Encalada started in April 1872 and the ship was launched in 1875.

In January 1878, President Aníbal Pinto ordered the ambassador to Europe, Alberto Blest Gana, to put the ships up for sale as soon as the dispute with Argentina was resolved to help alleviate the economic crises that prevailed in Chile. On behalf of Blest Gana, Reed offered the United Kingdom Cochrane for 220,000 pounds sterling, but the British were not interested. He then attempted to sell the ships to Russia with the same result.

== Operational service ==
Being the flagship of the Chilean armada, Blanco Encalada actively participated in the War of the Pacific. The frigate's first actions, under the command of Admiral Juan Williams Rebolledo, consisted of taking part in the blockade of Iquique and in the failed expedition to the port of Callao.

Afterward, Blanco Encalada tried, unsuccessfully, to hunt the Peruvian monitor Huáscar. Williams’ inability to put an end to what became known as the "Huáscar Raids" finally motivated him to resign his command. The failure of a decisive victory against the monitor was primarily owed to the bad state of the engines and boilers of Blanco Encalada and the skill of the commander of the Peruvian ship, Miguel Grau Seminario.

Command passed to Commander‐in‐Chief Galvarino Riveros Cárdenas, who ordered the fleet to regroup and carry out repairs on Blanco Encalada and her consorts. For this purpose, Blanco Encalada was anchored in Mejillones to make repairs to the engine using the workshops of the Salitres de Antofagasta Company. The hull was cleaned using divers brought from Valparaíso. The success of the repairs, which were finished at the end of September, was limited however. The ship could achieve, in a test voyage, a speed of only 9 knots (17 km/h; 10 mph). After the repairs, Blanco Enclada participated in the Battle of Angamos where the Chilean fleet finally captured Huáscar on 8 October 1879. The last action in which Blanco Encalada participated was the capture, in the close quarters of Mollendo, of the gunboat Pilcomayo on 18 November.

== Sinking ==
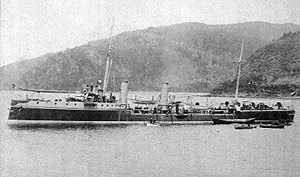
Torpedo gunboat Patricio Lynch

On 23 April 1891, during the Chilean Civil War, Blanco Encalada was sunk at Caldera Bay by a torpedo launched from the rebel gunboat Almirante Lynch. The ironclad was caught unprepared at anchor with banked fires, unable to maneuver.

== Commanders of Blanco Encalada ==
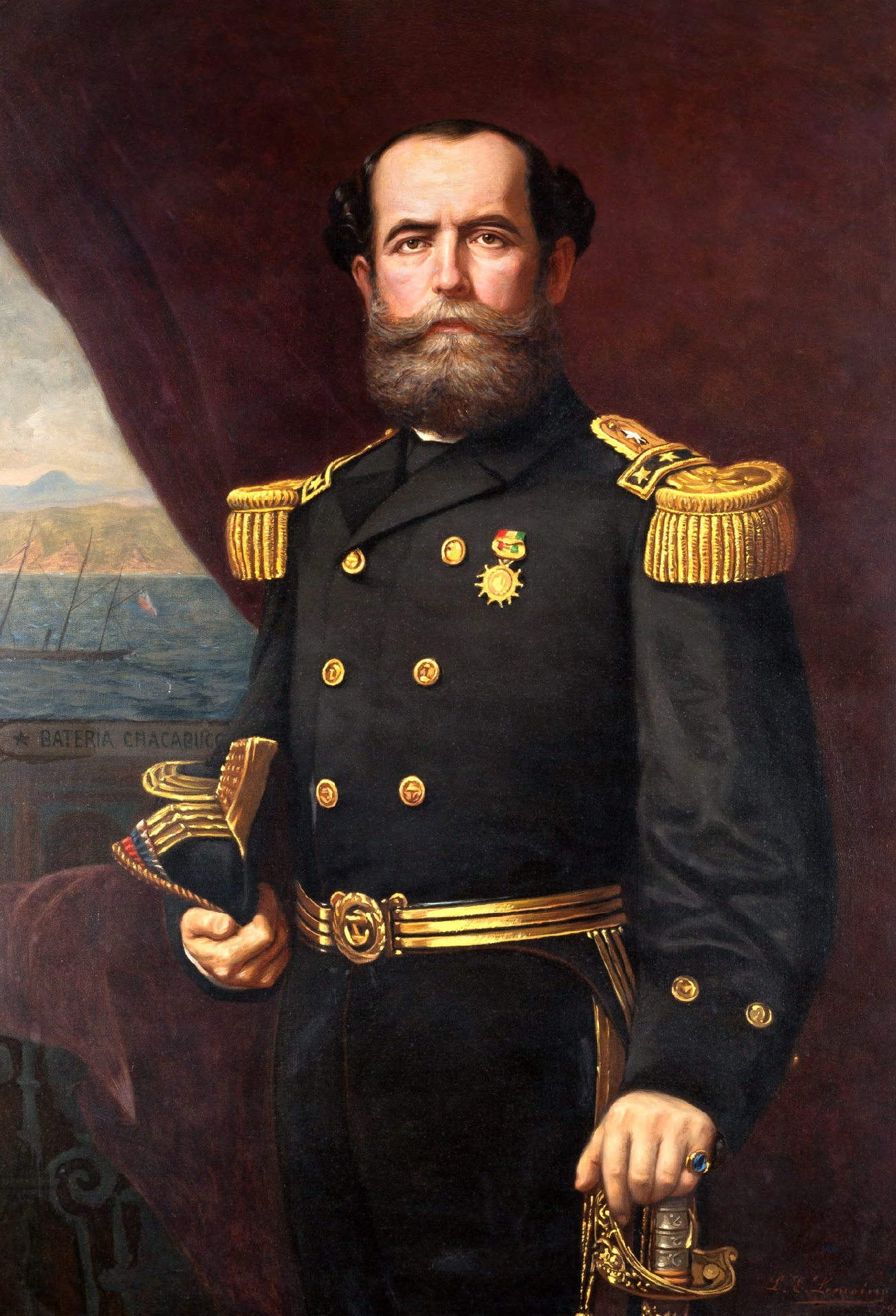
Juan Williams Rebolledo

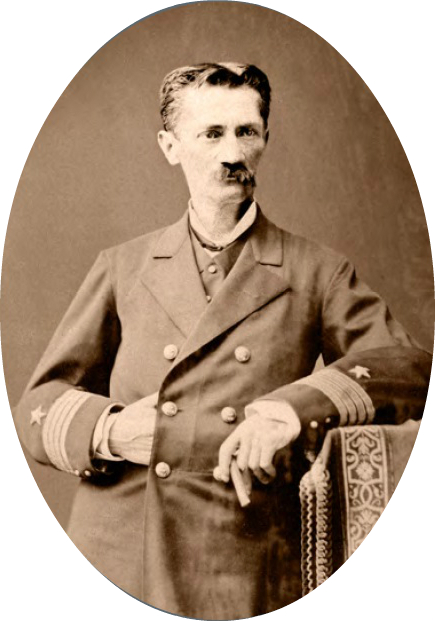
Galvarino Riveros
