= Monument to Miguel Grau Seminario =

Monument in Lima

Monumento a Miguel Grau Seminario
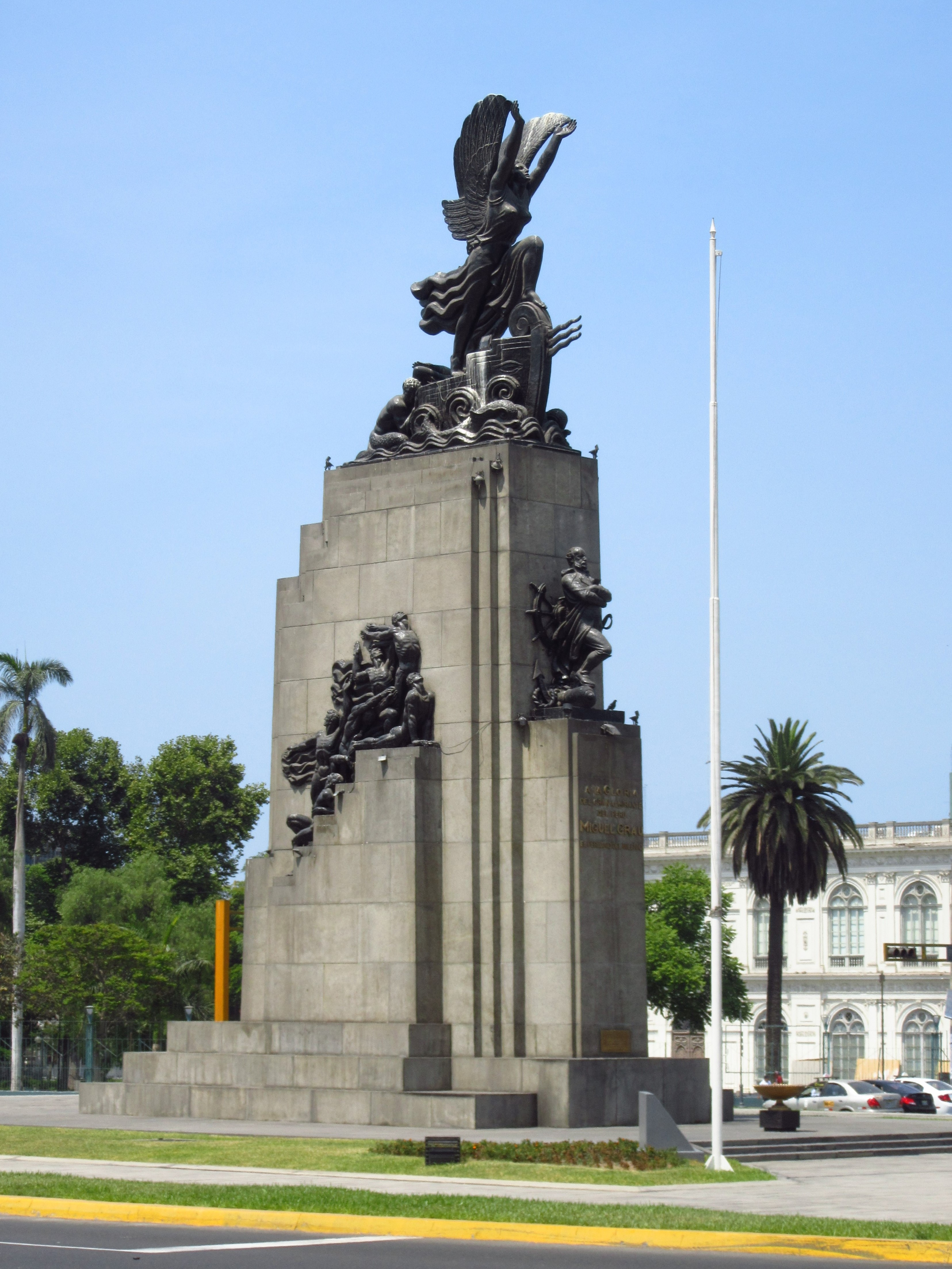
- 12°03′35″S 77°02′09″W
- Location: Plaza Grau
- Designer: Victorio Macho
- Type: Memorial
- Material: Granite and bronze
- Beginning date: 1945
- Completion date: 1946
- Opening date: October 28, 1946
- Dedicated to: Miguel Grau, et al.

The Monument to Miguel Grau Seminario (Spanish: Monumento a Miguel Grau Seminario) is a commemorative monument located in Plaza Grau, in the historic centre of Lima, Peru. The monument was declared as movable property part of the Cultural Heritage of the Nation.

== History ==
The monument, work of the Spanish sculptor Victorio Macho, was inaugurated on October 28, 1946 during the government of President José Luis Bustamante y Rivero. Towards the side of the Paseo Colón, a tribune was enabled for the guests (officials, diplomats, etc.), which were received by a special commission, chaired by the Captain Arturo Jiménez Pacheco.

The scenario featured members of the Armed Forces, Civil Guard and Battalions representating schools of Lima and Callao. The line was in command of Marshal Eloy Ureta, accompanied by its General Staff: General Manuel A. Odría, Luis Solari, Juan de Dios Párcos and Manuel Forero.

The ceremony began with a minute of silence in memory of the hero of Angamos, followed by an air exhibition. After the exhibition, President Bustamante and Rivero, accompanied by the mayor of Lima and veterans of the War of the Pacific, went to the foot of the monument. Frigate Manuel Elías Bonnemaison, the last survivor of the Huáscar crew, was responsible for decorting the veil that covered the sculpture. Before Grau's effigy, President Bustamante read in a speech that culminated as follows:

Admiral:

The dimension of your feat has enlarged over time. In the distant perspective we are angry a symbol of contours giants and present teachings. You had limited and fragile means; But your breath knew how to give them effectiveness and greatness. Your tiny ship has grown, Admiral; And there is a subtle fire power that envy the cannons in the austere silence of the dismantled roofs. Your sacrifice was not unsuccessful or a vain gesture of immolation of those who fell into the brega. Your shadow Augusta presides over our seas; And there is an altar for your bust in each ship of our fleet; and a corner of emotion in each chest of our sailors. The Navy of Peru figures its pride in your memory and the nation, spiritually gathered at the foot of this monument, tells you with an accent of shocking gratitude:

Glory to you, Admiral!

— José Luis Bustamante y Rivero, October 28, 1946

== Overview ==
The monument features a sculpture of Admiral Miguel Grau Seminario, a sailor who died in the battle of Angamos and is locally considered as the greatest Peruvian war hero of the War of the Pacific, a war between Bolivia, Chile and Peru from 1879 to 1884.

The body of the monument is a four-sided granitic monolith, with vertical stretch marks and stands of ascending rhythms, which, according to the author, symbolizes the land of Peru. The stands that are seen at their base symbolize the sea. High height of the main face or front, is the sculpture of the hero represented with his sailor uniform and with his arms crossed, between a helm and the anchors of a ship. Under it, on the pedestal, a dedication reads: "To the glory of the great admiral of Peru Miguel Grau, the Millennium Peruvian." On the side faces are symbolic sculptures about stands, representing men who reach the heights with difficulty. In the posterior face there is a commemorative plaque of the battle of Angamos. And finally, the work is crowned by the allegory of fame, which raises its arms towards the sky in clamor of immortality, and that is driven in a mythical ship by tritones and sirens.

Opposite the square where the monument is located, between the Paseo de la República, Miguel Grau Avenue and Paseo Colón, the Paseo de los Héroes Navales begins.

== See also ==
- Plaza Grau
- Paseo de los Héroes Navales
