= List of ambassadors of Bolivia to Peru =

Ambassador of Bolivia to the Republic of Peru
- Coat of arms of Bolivia
- Incumbent; Eva Gloria Chuquimia Mamani since June 14, 2024
- Ministry of Foreign Affairs; Los Castaños 235, San Isidro

The Extraordinary and Plenipotentiary Ambassador of Bolivia to the Republic of Peru is the official representative of the Plurinational State of Bolivia to the Republic of Peru.

== History ==
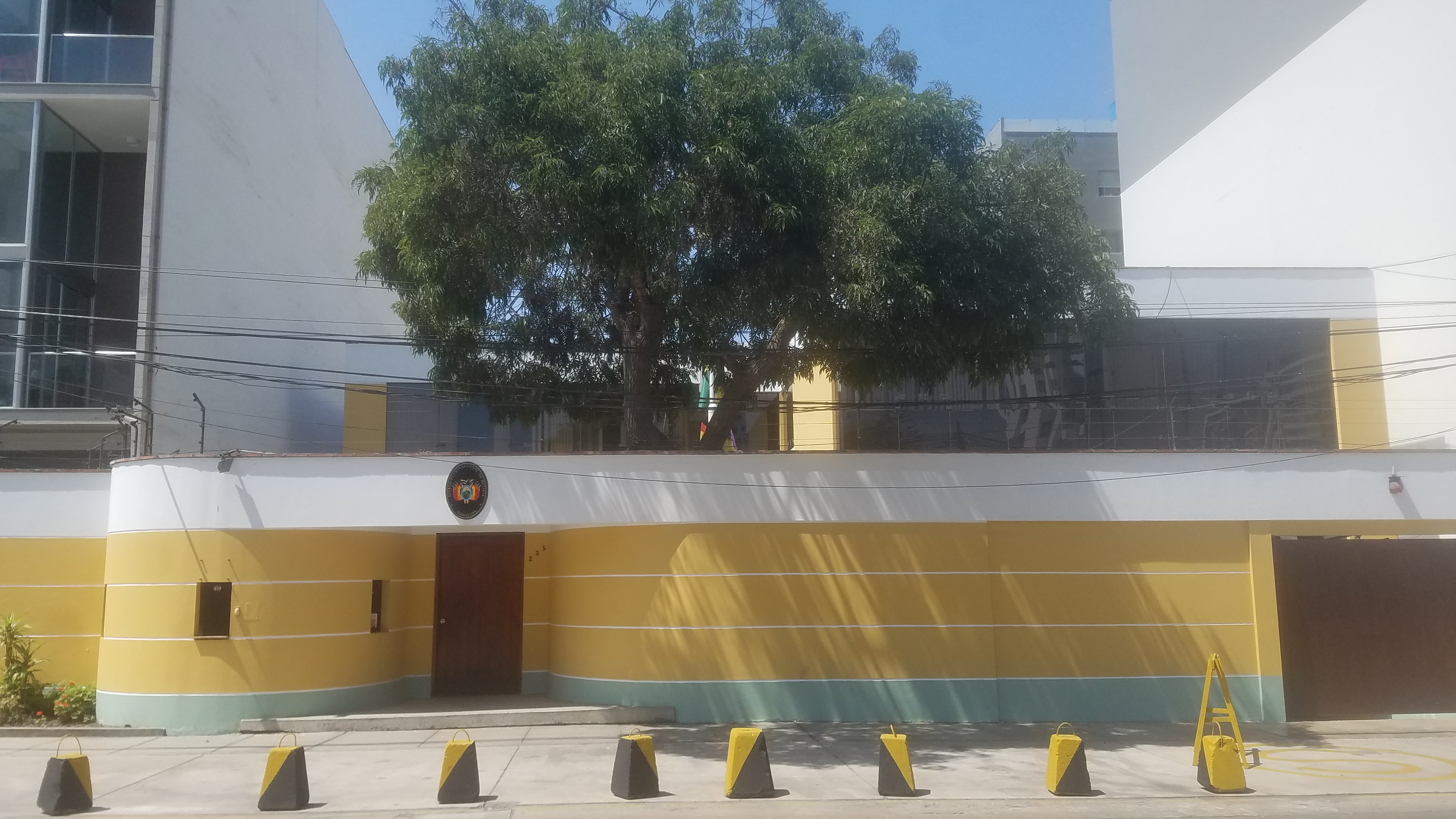
The embassy in San Isidro, Lima.

Both Bolivia and Peru share a common history in the fact that both nations were once part of the Inca Empire and then as part of the Spanish Empire. Relations between both countries were established soon after their independence. Since then, relations have been turbulent, from a territorial dispute arising from the independence of Bolivia, to both countries allying themselves against Chile during the War of the Pacific.

Nevertheless, relations between both nations have remained close and both nations work together in South American multilateral organizations. There have been numerous visits between leaders of both nations, and Bolivia was allowed to build a port south of Peru's port of Ilo in 2010.

In 2023, Vladimir Cerrón, former Regional Governor of Junín, unsuccessfully sought refuge at the embassy's chancery and residence, both located in San Isidro District. The news reached the National Police of Peru, who sent patrol units to both buildings.

== List of representatives ==
Name	Portrait	Term begin	Term end	President	Notes
1941: Relations elevated to embassy level
Juan de la Cruz Benavente		1863	after 1873?	José María de Achá	The first representative after the re-establishment of relations, he negotiated the signing of a defensive treaty against Chile.
Severo Fernández		1909	1912	Eliodoro Villazón	
Juan María Zalles		August 3, 1916	1917	Ismael Montes	Resigned
Néstor Cueto Vidaurre		March 1917		Ismael Montes	He presented his credentials in March of 1917.
Hernando Siles		1941	November 23, 1942	Enrique Peñaranda	First to serve as ambassador.
Alvaro Pérez del Castillo		May 1963		Víctor Paz Estenssoro	Pérez presented his credentials on May 22, 1963.
Jorge Escobari		1971	1974	Juan José Torres	As ambassador.
Jorge Escobari		1981	1983	Luis García Meza	Second term as ambassador.
Walter Montenegro		1983	1986	Hernán Siles Zuazo	As ambassador.
Ñuflo Chávez Ortiz		January 6, 1986	August 6, 1986	Víctor Paz Estenssoro	As ambassador.
Oscar Sandóval Morón		August 6, 1986	August 6, 1988	Víctor Paz Estenssoro	
Adalberto Violand		August 28, 1989	August 6, 1993	Jaime Paz Zamora	As ambassador.
Jorge Gumucio Granier		June 6, 1994	June 3, 2000	Gonzalo Sánchez de Lozada	As ambassador. He was a hostage from December 1996 to April 1997 during the Japanese embassy hostage crisis.
Franz Ondarza Linares		June 3, 2000	December 10, 2002	Hugo Banzer	As ambassador.
Eloy Ávila Alberdi		December 10, 2002	June 8, 2006	Gonzalo Sánchez de Lozada	As ambassador.
Franz Solano Chuquimia		June 8, 2006	July 1, 2011	Evo Morales	As ambassador.
Jorge Ledezma		July 1, 2011	July 18, 2014	Evo Morales	As ambassador.
Gustavo Rodríguez Ostria		July 18, 2014	February 4, 2021	Evo Morales	As ambassador.
Carlos Aparicio		February 4, 2021	March 26, 2024	Luis Arce	As ambassador.
Eva Gloria Chuquimia Mamani		June 14, 2024	Incumbent	Luis Arce	

== See also ==
- List of ambassadors of Peru to Bolivia
