= Adalberto Violand =

Bolivian politician (1918–2005)

Senator of Bolivia (Representing La Paz)
- In office August 6, 1985 – August 6, 1989

President of the Bolivian Football Federation
- In office 1959–1961
- Preceded by: Luis Saavedra Camacho
- Succeeded by: Ángel de la Fuente

Personal details
- Born: 1918 La Paz, Bolivia
- Died: 2005 La Paz, Bolivia
- Awards: Order of the Sun of Peru

Adalberto Violand Alcázar (La Paz, 1918 — 2005) was a Bolivian businessman, ambassador and politician. He was also the president of the Bolivian Football Federation from 1959 to 1961.

== Early life ==
Violand was born in 1918 in the city of La Paz, belonging to a family of German descent. He did his primary and secondary studies at the German School in the city of La Paz, where he graduated from high school in 1936. He continued with his higher education, moving to study in Hamburg where he obtained a master's degree in foreign trade.

Violand always had a role oriented towards the political right of the country, where he played an important role as a manager in Bolivia's private company at critical political moments. He was president of the Confederation of Private Entrepreneurs of Bolivia (CEPB) on two occasions; the first from 1970 to 1972. During his first presidency he resisted and opposed the government of President Juan José Torres Gonzales and supported the coup d'état of Colonel Hugo Banzer. His second presidency of CEPB was between 1980 and 1981.

== Political career ==
Violand's political life begins when, from 1973 to 1975 (at age 55), he was appointed advisor to the then president of Bolivia Hugo Banzer Suárez. Violand also founded the National Maritime Council between 1975 and 1976.

In 1975 to 1977, Adalberto Violand received the mission of President Hugo Banzer Suárez to be the first ambassador of Bolivia in Chile, after both countries reestablished diplomatic relations that had been broken 13 years earlier (in 1962) during the second government of Víctor Paz Estenssoro but which were resumed again with the Charaña Accords in 1975. On this topic, Violand wrote in 2004 (29 years later) a book titled Retorno al mar con soberanía: una negociación frustrada.

=== Senator of Bolivia ===
After 8 years, Violand returns to politics with Hugo Banzer Suárez, being with him one of the founders of the Nationalist Democratic Action (ADN), a party with which he ran for the position of senator. He won the 1985 general elections in Bolivia, representing the department of La Paz in the Senate.

When his political party returned to exercise government responsibilities in 1989 according to the Patriotic Accord (AP), Violand returned to Bolivian diplomacy where he was again appointed Bolivian ambassador to Peru from 1989 to 1993.

During the second government of President Hugo Banzer Suárez he was appointed Bolivian ambassador to Germany during 1997, and then ambassador to Egypt from 1998 to 2002.

In 2002 Violand retired to private life after remaining for 29 years (since 1973) in the public and political life of the country. After 3 years of his retirement, he died in 2005 in the city of La Paz when he was 84 years old.

== See also ==
- Jorge Escobari
- Hugo Banzer
