= Victorio Macho =

Spanish sculptor

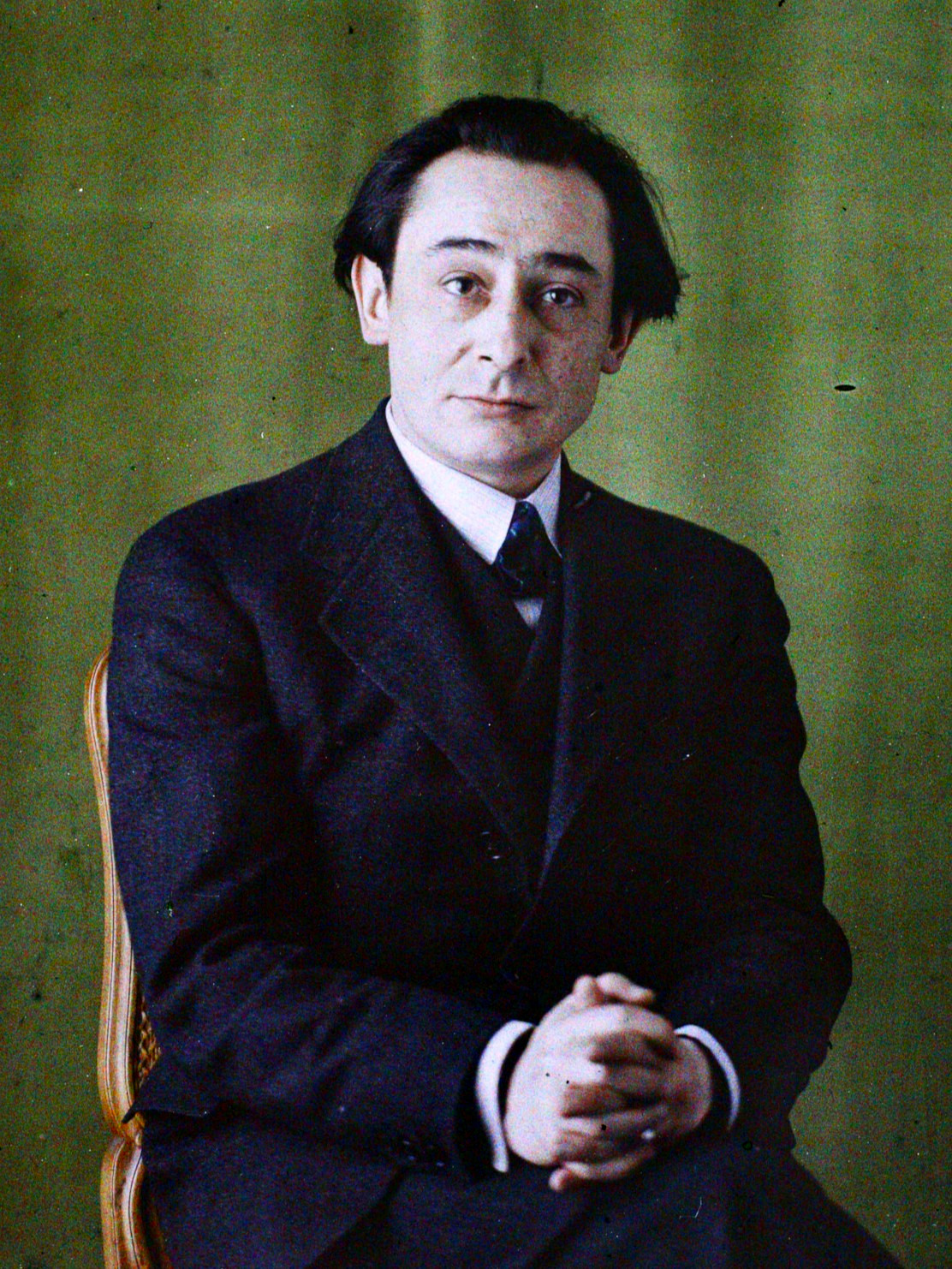
- 1928 Autochrome by Georges Chevalier
- Born: December 23, 1887; Palencia, Spain
- Died: July 13, 1966 (aged 78); Toledo, Spain
- Occupation: Architect
- Buildings: Cristo del Otero

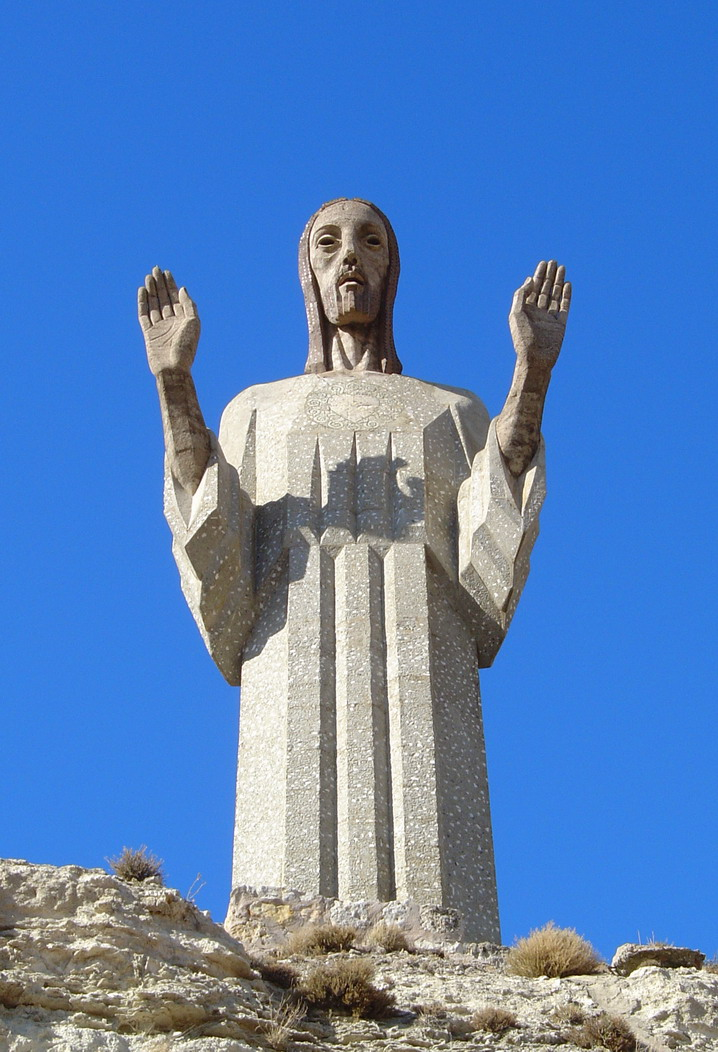
Cristo del Otero, where Macho's tomb is located.

Victorio Macho (December 23, 1887, in Palencia – July 13, 1966, in Toledo, Spain) was a renowned 20th-century Spanish sculptor. He is considered to be one of the greats of modern Spanish sculpture. His style was influenced by art deco. His home and workshop in Toledo was converted into a museum dedicated to his work, the Victorio Macho Museum, after his death. He has been featured on a postage stamp of Spain.

== Biography ==
Victorio Macho was born into a family of modest means in Palencia, Spain in 1887. His parents enrolled him in the school of Fine Arts and Crafts of Santander, where he learned to sculpt. In 1903, at the age of 16 he moved to Madrid continuing his studies at the Academy of Fine Arts of San Fernando. He first became famous with a monument to Galdós. It is a consecrated from his exhibition at the Museum of Modern Art of Madrid, 1921.

He left Spain during the dictatorship of Primo de Rivera and went to live in Hendaye, just over the border in the Basque region of France. He sculpted monuments for Unamuno and Ramón y Cajal. In 1936 he was elected into the Academy of Fine Arts of San Fernando. The outcome of the Spanish Civil War pushed him to exile in France, Russia, and finally to America. After living six months in Colombia, he began an extended stay in Lima in Peru, where he married Zoila Barrós Conti. He finally returned to Spain in 1952.

He established his home and workshop in Toledo in central Spain. Since 1967 this same building houses the Victorio Macho museum, created from Zoila's generous donation to the Spanish State. The name of the house is Tarpeian Rock.

From first marriage, in 1917, he married María Martínez de Romarate, widow of a marquis and sister-Guiomar, platonic love of Antonio Machado.

In 1964 he received the Grand Cross of the Order of Isabella the Catholic.

He died in Toledo on July 13, 1966, and his remains were returned to Palencia, the city of his birth. He was buried at the foot of Cristo del Otero.

== Works ==
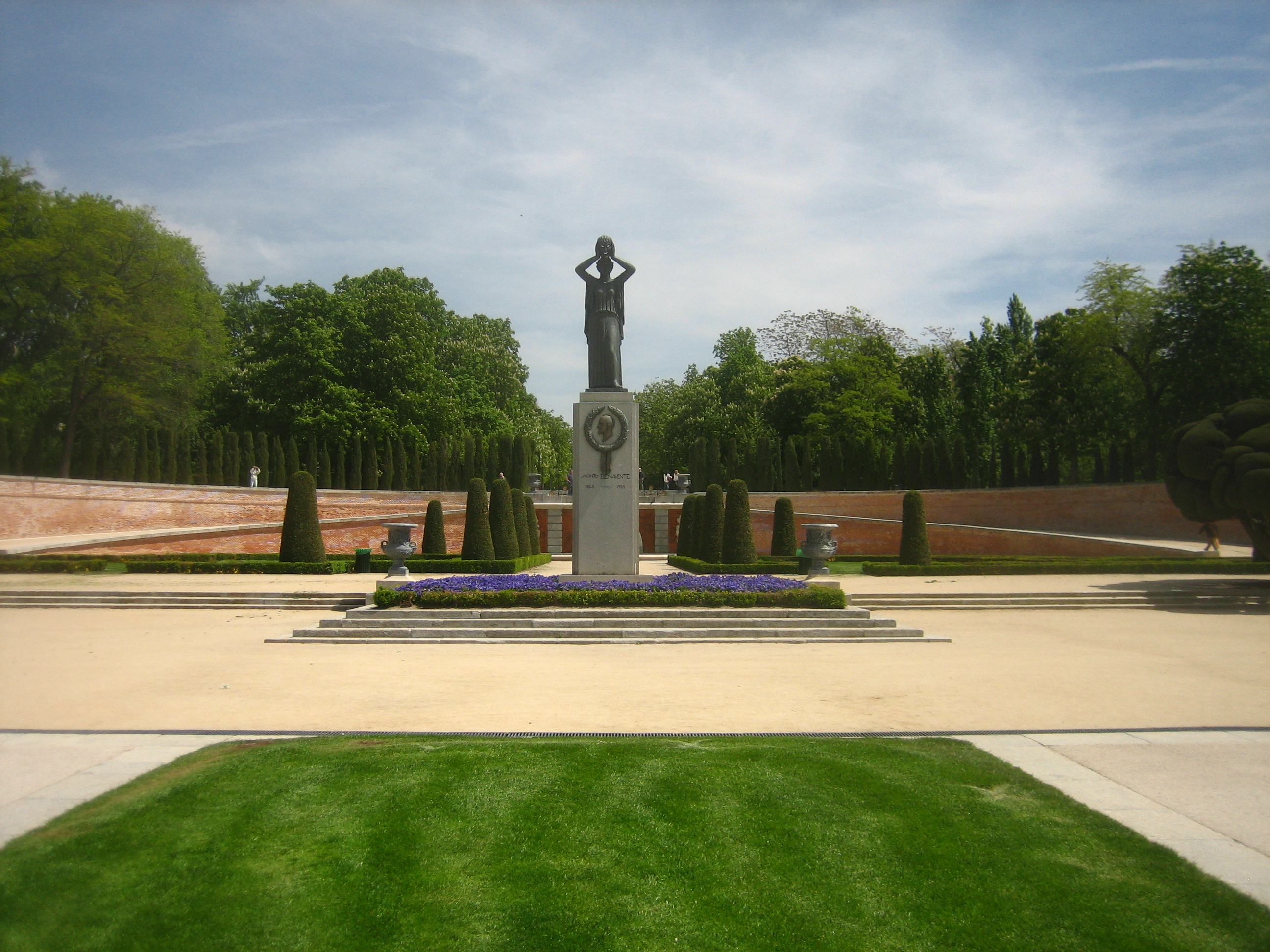
Monument to Benavente (Retiro, Madrid, 1962).

=== Portraits ===
- 1903 - Danielillo
- 1916 - Sailor Vasco. Toledo, Victorio Macho Museum.
- 1920 - Recumbent statue of his brother Marcelo. Toledo, Victorio Macho Museum.
- 1929 - Head of Ramón del Valle-Inclán. Toledo, Victorio Macho Museum.
- 1935 - Bust of Pio Baroja. San Sebastian, San Telmo Museum.
- 1935 - Statue of mother Toledo, Victorio Macho Museum.

=== Public works ===
- 1918 - Monument to Benito Pérez Galdós, Galdós Glorieta, Parque del Retiro, Madrid.
- 1922 - Sculpture Monument to Juan Sebastián Elcano, designed by architects José Agustín Aguirre and Azpiroz in Guetaria, Guipúzcoa.
- 1925-1927 - Power Concha Espina, Jardines de Pereda, Santander.
- 1926 - Monument of Santiago Ramón y Cajal, Paseo de Venezuela, Parque del Retiro, Madrid.
- 1930 - Bust of Miguel de Unamuno, University of Salamanca, Salamanca.
- 1930 - The Roman statue atop the building on Gran Via 60, Madrid.
- 1931 - Christ of Otero, Palencia, where the sculptor himself is buried.
- 1937 - Monument to Sebastian de Belalcazar, Santiago de Cali, Colombia.
- 1937 - Monument to Sebastian de Belalcazar, Morro del Tulcán, Popayan.
- 1940 - Rafael Uribe Uribe Monument, located in the Enrique Olaya Herrera National Park in Bogota, Colombia.
- 1945 - Monumento a Miguel Grau Seminario, Plaza Grau, Lima
- 1962 - Monument to Jacinto Benavente, Parque del Retiro, Madrid.
- Monument to Benito Pérez Galdós, Las Palmas de Gran Canaria.
- Alonso Berruguete Monument, Plaza Mayor of Palencia.
- Monument to Simón Bolívar Genius, Plaza Caracas of Caracas. Copies in Bogota (Colombia), Sao Paulo (Brasil), Riobamba (Ecuador) and Lima (Peru).

=== Religious works ===
- Christ Church. Corrales de Buelna, Cantabria.

=== Funeral works ===
- Dr. Llorente Sepulchre, Cemetery San Justo, Madrid (1917).
- Tomb of the poet Tomás Morales Castellano, Las Palmas de Gran Canaria (whole figure appears the pleading, which was discussed in the Iberian Artists Exhibition)
- Grave of Marcelino Menéndez Pelayo, Santander Cathedral.
- Grave Marcelo Macho, brother of artist, Casa-Museo Victorio Macho, Toledo.
- Family Mausoleum Simón Bolívar, Trinity Chapel, Cathedral of Caracas, Venezuela (1930).
