= Bolivian Football Federation =

Sports governing body of Bolivia

CONMEBOL
- Founded: 1925; 101 years ago
- Headquarters: Cochabamba
- FIFA affiliation: 1926
- CONMEBOL affiliation: 1926
- President: Fernando Costa
- Website: fbf.com.bo

The Bolivian Football Federation (Spanish: Federación Boliviana de Fútbol, locally [feðeɾaˈsjom boliˈβjana ðe ˈfuðβol]; FBF) is the governing body of football in Bolivia. It was founded in 1925, making it the eighth oldest South American federation. It affiliated to CONMEBOL and FIFA in 1926 and is in charge of the Bolivia national football team.

The FBF is the federation of two entities:

- Bolivian Primera División (Bolivian Professional Football League): comprises the 12 professional football teams in the first division.
- Asociación de Fútbol Nacional (ANF) (National Football Association): 9 departmental football associations, one from each of Bolivia's nine departments.

== Association staff ==
Name	Position	Source
(Bolivia) Ángel Fernando Costa	President	
(Bolivia) Edwin Callapino	Vice President	
(Bolivia) Ronaldo Paz	2nd Vice President	
(Bolivia) Gaston Uribe	General Secretary	
n/a	Treasurer	
(Bolivia) Pablo Escobar	Technical Director	
(Bolivia) Oscar Villegas	Team Coach (Men's)	
n/a	Team Coach (Women's)	
(Bolivia) José Claure	Media/Communications Manager	
(Bolivia) Errol Mendoza Durán	Futsal Coordinator	
(Bolivia) Juan Carlos Lugones Antezana	Referee Coordinator	
(Bolivia) José Jordan	Chairperson of the Referees Committee	
(Bolivia) Victor Chambi	Head/Director of the Referees Department	

== List of presidents ==
Period	Name
1925 - 1928	Aniceto Solares Llano
1928 - 1929	Luis Castel Quiroga
1929 - 1931	Eduardo Zapcovic
1931 - 1936	no data
1936 - 1944	Luis Castel Quiroga
1944 - 1947	no data
1947 - 1953	Alfredo Galindo Quiroga
1953 - 1959	Luis Saavedra Camacho
1959	1st intervention (no data)
1959 - 1961	Adalberto Violand Alcázar
1961	Ángel de la Fuente (interim)
1961 - 1969	Roberto Prada Estrada
1969	José luis de Aranguren y Núñez (2nd intervention)
1969 - 1971	Eufronio Padilla (3rd intervention)
1971 - 1972	Mario Marañón Zárate
1972 - 1974	Heriberto Centellas
1974 - 1977	Mauro Cuellar Caballero
1977	Mario Oxa Bustos
1977 - 1978	Julio Lara Salazar (4th intervention)
1978 - 1986	Edgar Peña Gutiérrez
1986 - 1988	Romer Osuna Añez
1988 - 1990	Alfredo Salazar Rivas
1990 - 1992	José Saavedra Banzer
1992 - 1994	Guido Loayza Mariaca
1994 - 1998	José Saavedra Banzer
1998 - 2000	Sergio Asbún Yacir
2000 - 2006	Walter Castedo Rivero
2006 - 2015	Carlos Chávez Landívar
2015 - 2016	Marco Ortega (interim)
2016 - 2017	Rolando López Herbas
2017	Marco Antonio Peredo Mercado (interim)
2017 - 2018	Carlos Ribera (interim)
2018 - 2020	César Salinas Sinka
2020-2020	Marcos Rodríguez Ibáñez
2020-present	Ángel Fernando Costa Sarmiento
