= List of ambassadors of Peru to Bolivia =

Ambassador of Peru to the Plurinational State of Bolivia
- Great Seal of Peru
- Incumbent; Vacant since January 6, 2023
- Ministry of Foreign Affairs; Fernando Guachalla 300, La Paz
- Appointer: The president of Peru
- Inaugural holder: Ignacio Ortiz de Zevallos
- Formation: 1826
- Website: Embassy of Peru in Bolivia

The extraordinary and plenipotentiary ambassador of Peru to the Plurinational State of Bolivia is the official representative of the Republic of Peru to the Plurinational State of Bolivia.

Both Bolivia and Peru share a common history in the fact that both nations were once part of the Inca Empire and then as part of the Spanish Empire. Relations between both countries were established soon after their independence. Since then, relations have turbulent, from a territorial dispute arising from the independence of Bolivia, to both countries allying themselves against Chile during the War of the Pacific.

Nevertheless, relations between both nations have remained close and both nations work together in South American multilateral organizations. There have been numerous visits between leaders of both nations, and Bolivia was allowed to build a port south of Peru's port of Ilo in 2010.

== List of representatives ==
Name	Portrait	Term begin	Term end	President	Notes
Ignacio Ortiz de Zevallos		June 1826	1827	Simón Bolívar	Minister plenipotentiary
Mariano Alejo Álvarez		1829	1830	José de La Mar	Minister plenipotentiary
Pedro Antonio de La Torre y Luna-Pizarro		1831	1831	Agustín Gamarra	Minister plenipotentiary
José Luis Gómez Sánchez		1835	1835	Felipe Santiago Salaverry	Minister plenipotentiary on special mission
Anselmo Quiroz		1835	1835	Felipe Santiago Salaverry	Minister plenipotentiary on special mission
José Gregorio Paz Soldán		1841	1841	Agustín Gamarra	Minister plenipotentiary; first representative since the end of the Peru–Bolivian Confederation and during the 1841–42 war with Bolivia
Francisco Javier Mariátegui y Tellería		1842	1843	Disputed	Minister plenipotentiary
Manuel Toribio Ureta		1843	1843	Disputed	Minister plenipotentiary
Pedro Astete Núñez		1845	1847	Ramón Castilla	Chargé d'Affairs
Domingo Elías		1847	1847	Ramón Castilla	Minister plenipotentiary
Cipriano Coronel Zegarra		1848	1848	Ramón Castilla	Chargé d'Affairs
Mariano José Sanz León		1849	1851	Ramón Castilla	Chargé d'Affairs
Mariano Paredes		1851	1853	José Rufino Echenique	Chargé d'Affairs
José Narciso Campos Errea		1864	1865	Juan Antonio Pezet	Chargé d'Affairs
Mariano Lino Cornejo		1866	1867	Mariano Ignacio Prado	Chargé d'Affairs
José María de La Torre Bueno		1868	1869	Pedro Diez Canseco	Chargé d'Affairs
Juan de la Cruz Lizárraga		1869	1870	José Balta	Resident minister
José Antonio García y García		1870	1870	José Balta	Minister plenipotentiary on a special mission
Juan de la Cruz Lizárraga		1870	1873	José Balta	Resident minister
Aníbal Víctor de la Torre y Vidaurre		1873	1875	Manuel Pardo	Minister plenipotentiary
Víctor R. Benavides y Estensoro		1875	1875	Manuel Pardo	Interim chargé d'affairs
Miguel de San Román		1875	1877	Manuel Pardo	Resident minister. Not to be confused with the ex-President.
Bruno Bueno y Aguinaga		1877	1878	Mariano Ignacio Prado	Minister plenipotentiary
José Luis Quiñones		1878	1878	Mariano Ignacio Prado	Minister plenipotentiary
Enrique Bustamante y Salazar		1880	1881	Nicolás de Piérola	Minister plenipotentiary
Alejandro de la Fuente y de las Casas		?	?	?	Chargé d'affairs
Melitón Porras Osores		July 12, 1905	?	José Pardo y Barreda	As Envoy Extraordinary and Minister Plenipotentiary
Solón Polo		1909	1911	Augusto B. Leguía	Minister plenipotentiary. He signed the Polo-Bustamante Treaty.
Federico Elguera		1911	1912	Augusto B. Leguía	Minister plenipotentiary
Lino Velarde Diez-Canseco		1912	1912	Augusto B. Leguía	Chargé d'affairs
Alejandro de la Fuente y de las Casas		1912	1914	Augusto B. Leguía	Chargé d'affairs
Víctor Andrés Belaúnde		1915	1915	Óscar R. Benavides	Chargé d'affairs
José María Barreto		1915	1916	Óscar R. Benavides	Chargé d'affairs
Felipe de Osma y Pardo		1916	1917	José Pardo y Barreda	Minister plenipotentiary
Wenceslao Valera Olano		1917	1919	José Pardo y Barreda	Minister plenipotentiary
Alberto Rey de Castro y Romaña		1920	1920	Augusto B. Leguía	Minister plenipotentiary (did not serve)
Ernesto de Tezanos Pinto y Segovia		1920	1921	Augusto B. Leguía	Minister plenipotentiary
Alberto Bresani Rossel		1921	1922	Augusto B. Leguía	Minister plenipotentiary
Celso Gustavo Pastor Chávarri		1922	1923	Augusto B. Leguía	Minister plenipotentiary
Manuel Elías Bonnemaison		1923	1925	Augusto B. Leguía	Minister plenipotentiary
Pedro M. Olivera		1925	1926	Augusto B. Leguía	Minister plenipotentiary
Carlos Concha Cárdenas		1931	1934	Luis Miguel Sánchez Cerro	Minister plenipotentiary
José Luis Bustamante y Rivero		1934	1938	Óscar R. Benavides	Minister plenipotentiary
Carlos Holguín de Lavalle		1939	1942	Óscar R. Benavides	Minister plenipotentiary
José Luis Bustamante y Rivero		1942	1945	Manuel Prado Ugarteche	Ambassador
Eduardo Garland		1945	1947	José Luis Bustamante y Rivero	Ambassador
Arturo Gutiérrez de Tezanos Pinto		1948	1949	José Luis Bustamante y Rivero	Chargé d'affairs
Óscar Grau Astete		1949	1952	Manuel A. Odría	Ambassador
Fernando Gamio Palacio		1955	1956	Manuel A. Odría	Ambassador
Humberto Fernández-Dávila y Segovia		1956	1961	Manuel A. Odría	Ambassador
Pedro Ugarteche Tizón		1961	?	Manuel Prado Ugarteche	Ambassador
Aníbal Ponce Sobrevilla		1968	1968	Fernando Belaúnde	Ambassador
Eduardo Valdez Pérez del Castillo		1969	1971	Juan Velasco Alvarado	Ambassador
Jorge Guillermo Llosa Pautrat		1975	1977	Juan Velasco Alvarado	Ambassador
Manuel Augusto Roca Zela		1977	1980	Francisco Morales Bermúdez	Ambassador
Óscar Maúrtua		1988	1993	Alan García	Ambassador
Harry Belevan-McBride		1997	2001	Alberto Fujimori	Ambassador
Hernán Couturier		2001	2004	Alejandro Toledo	Ambassador
Luzmila Sanabria Ishikawa		2004	2006	Alejandro Toledo	Ambassador
Julio Fernando Rojas Samanez		2006?	2009	Alejandro Toledo	Ambassador
Manuel Rodríguez Cuadros		February 17, 2010	December 15, 2010	Alan García	Ambassador
Silvia Alfaro Espinoza		March 2011	2014	Alan García	Ambassador
Luis Benjamín Chimoy Álvarez		2015	August 2016	Ollanta Humala	Ambassador
Félix Denegri Boza		2016	?	Ollanta Humala	Ambassador
Carina Palacios Quincho		October 15, 2021	January 6, 2023	Pedro Castillo	Ambassador

== See also ==
- List of ambassadors of Bolivia to Peru
