= Cristo del Otero =

Sculpture

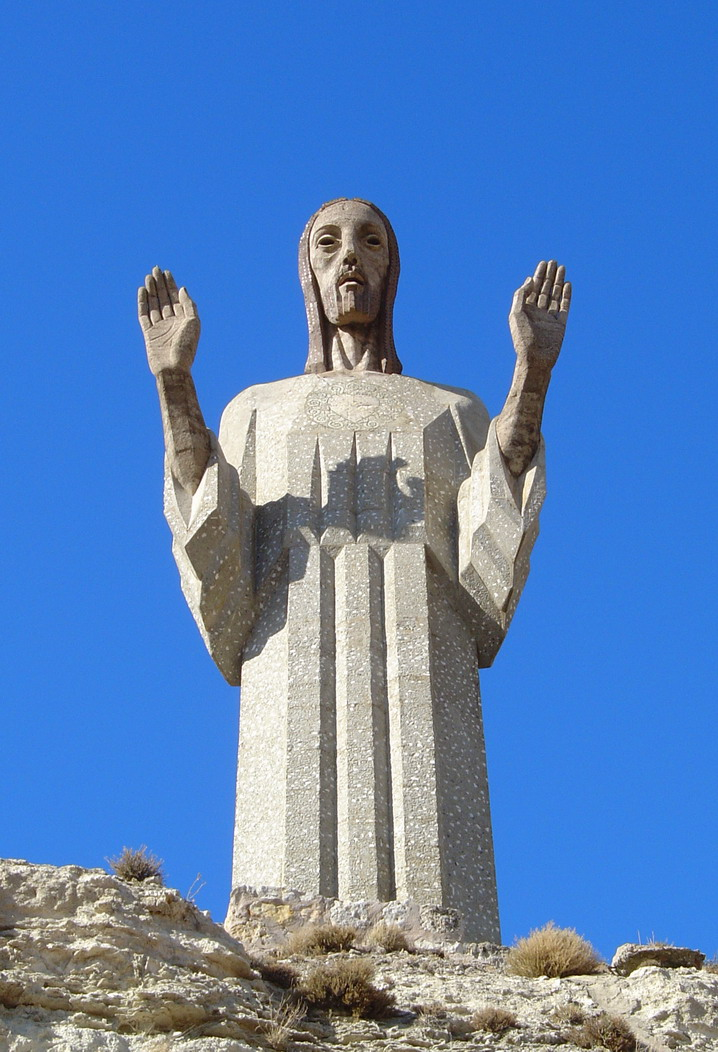
- Monument to Christ
- Interactive map of Cristo del Otero
- Location: Palencia, Palencia Province, Castilla y León, Spain
- Coordinates: 42°1′42″N 4°31′46″W
- Designer: Victorio Macho
- Material: Cement
- Height: 21 m (69 ft)
- Completion date: 12 June 1931

The Cristo del Otero (Christ of the Knoll) is a large sculpture and symbol of the city of Palencia in Spain, located on a knoll (otero) on the outskirts of the city. Another name, much less popular, is the Monument to the Sacred Heart of Jesus. The sculpture was designed by Victorio Macho, and it is also the location of his tomb.

== Description ==
The Christ seems to be in a position to bless the city. It was built in 1931 according to the project of sculptor Victorio Macho. It has a style reminiscent of Art Deco with Cubist resonances and echoes of ancient Egyptian art in the hieratic pose of the figure.

It is one of the highest statues of Jesus Christ in the world. At his feet is carved a chapel (called Santa Maria del Otero) and a small museum with items by the architect. At the entrance to the chapel is a small terrace and a gazebo there is the view of the city.

The initial project wanted to embed in the eyes of Christ blocks of ivory and marble, but the budget was insufficient, so the empty sockets presented today became windows.

His great verticality and slenderness may be because it is designed to be seen from below. One can also interpret this work as a vertical column conform in contrast to the horizontality of the Castilian countryside, covered with grain and sprinkled with poplars and oaks.

=== Initial design ===
The initial project by Macho was a statue 21 meters tall with head, arms and feet of bronze and a body decorated with large golden tiles. The arms of Christ, which are currently raised as a sign of protection, were to go sideways at an angle of about 40° to the body. In the end, the project was restructured to lighten the sculpture.

=== Height ===
There is an ongoing discussion about the official height of the Cristo del Otero. The exact height is not known. According to the brochures of City Hall, Christ is more than 20 meters high.

== Hermitage and museum ==
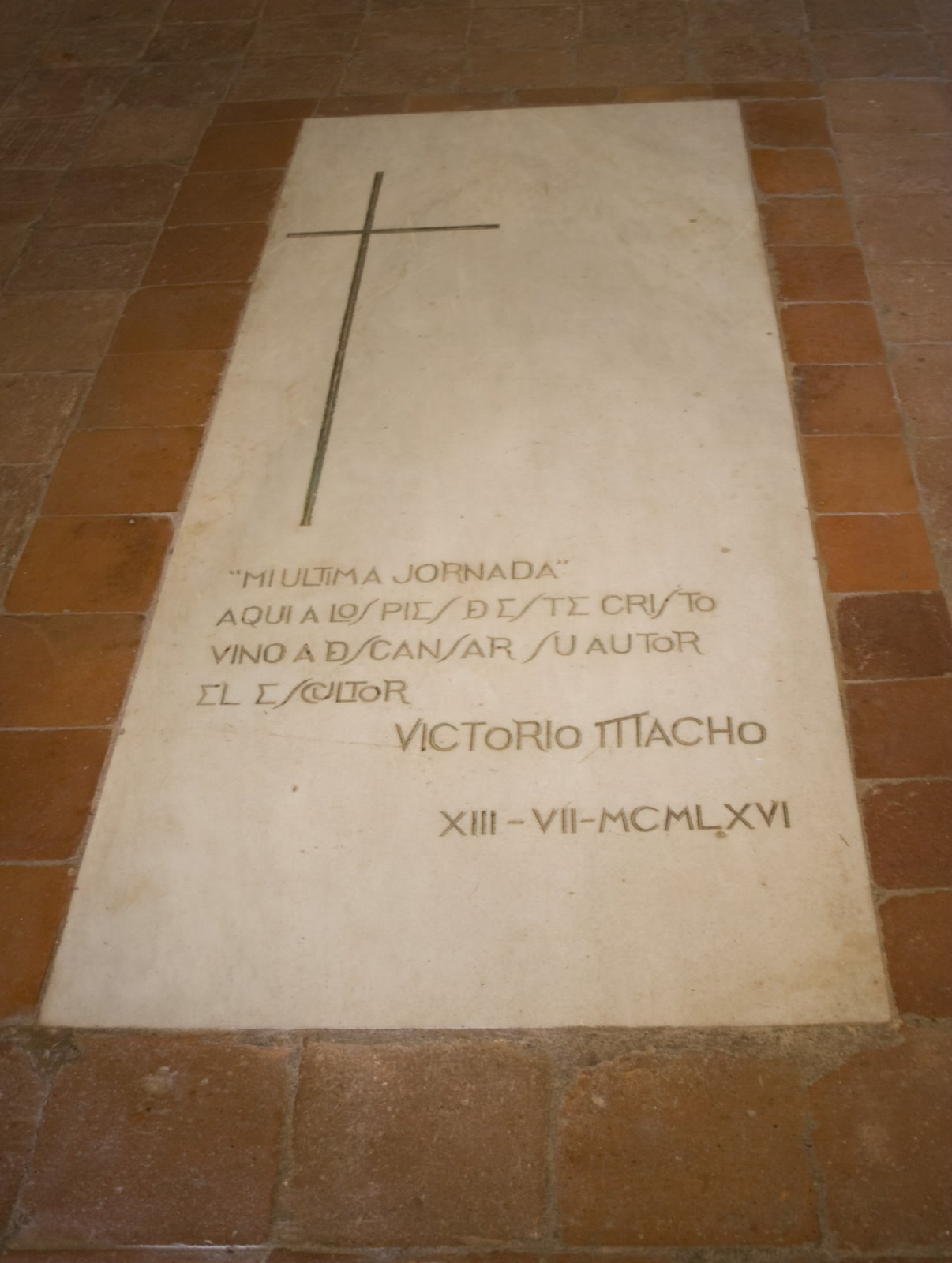
Tombstone of Victorio Macho

The feet of Jesus has a hermitage and museum. The small museum contains:

- Information panels of the life and work of Victorio Macho.
- Pictures of monuments, projects and other aspects of the same author.
- Videos of the author's works in Palencia.
- Busts of terracotta and patinated plaster bust of Christ.
- A life-size statue, Pregnancy, done in plaster, taken from a mold of Victorio Macho.
- Bronze statuettes (Waterboy and Iberian Farmer).

In the chapel, supported by many columns and completely whitewashed, one can contemplate:

- The central carving of Jesus Crucified (has a strong resemblance to the Christ of Mercy parading in Holy Week).
- Projects for the monument to Alonso Berruguete in Palencia.
- The grave of sculptor Victorio Macho, covered by a simple white marble tombstone

== See also ==
- Cristo Rey (Mexican statue)
- Cristo Rey (Colombian statue)
- Cristo de la Concordia
- List of statues of Jesus
