= Bolivia–Peru relations =

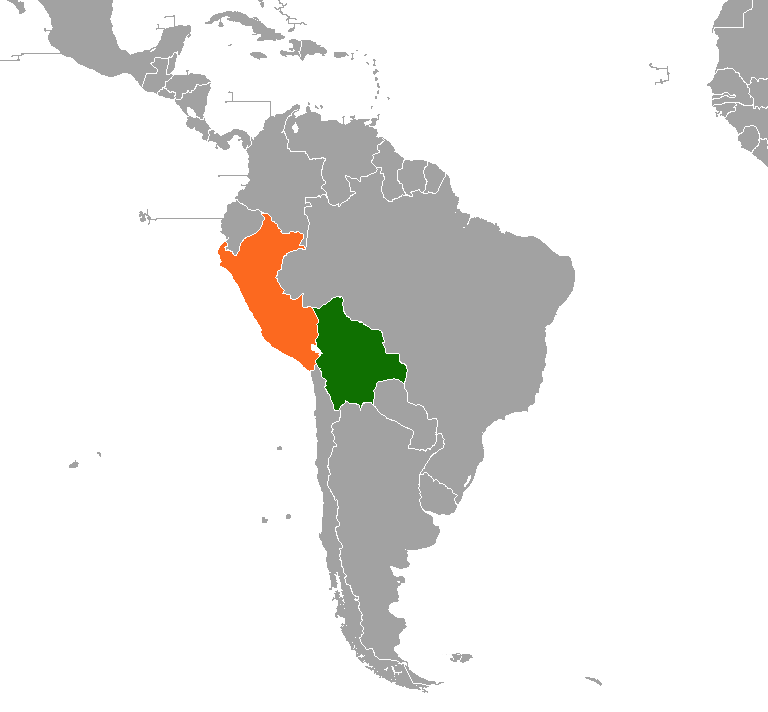
- Bolivia: Peru

Diplomatic mission
- Embassy of Bolivia, Lima: Embassy of Peru, La Paz

Bolivia–Peru relations are the current and historical bilateral relations between the Plurinational State of Bolivia and the Republic of Peru. Both nations are members of the Community of Latin American and Caribbean States, Group of 77, Organization of American States, Organization of Ibero-American States and the United Nations.

== History ==
Both Bolivia and Peru share a common history in the fact that both nations were once part of the Inca Empire and then as part of the Spanish Empire. During Spanish colonialism, Peru was governed by the Viceroyalty of Peru in Lima while the territory of Bolivia was split between the Viceroyalty of Peru and the Viceroyalty of the Río de la Plata in Buenos Aires. Soon after gaining independence from Spain, both nations joined to create the short-lived Peru–Bolivian Confederation. In 1839, both nations became independent nations. In 1879, both nations were allied against Chile during the War of the Pacific. At the end of the war, as a result, Bolivia lost all of its territory (Litoral Department) with access to the Pacific Ocean to Chile.

Relations between both nations have remained close and both nations work together in South American multilateral organizations. There have been numerous visits between leaders of both nations. In 1941, relations were elevated from legation to embassy level. In 2010, Peruvian President Alan García agreed to allow Bolivia to build a port south of Peru's port of Ilo.

On December 26, 2023, Peruvian politician Vladimir Cerrón, a fugitive for the past two months, reportedly sought political asylum at both the Bolivian embassy and its residence, located a few minutes away, with members of the National Police of Peru immediately positioning themselves outside of said embassy (as well as those of Cuba and Venezuela) to prevent such an event from taking place. Cerrón denied the allegations, claiming that him leaving the country was in the interests of the country's elite.

== Resident diplomatic missions ==
- Bolivia has an embassy in Lima and consulates in Cusco, Ilo, Puno and Tacna.
- Peru has an embassy in La Paz and consulates-general in Cochabamba and Santa Cruz de la Sierra.

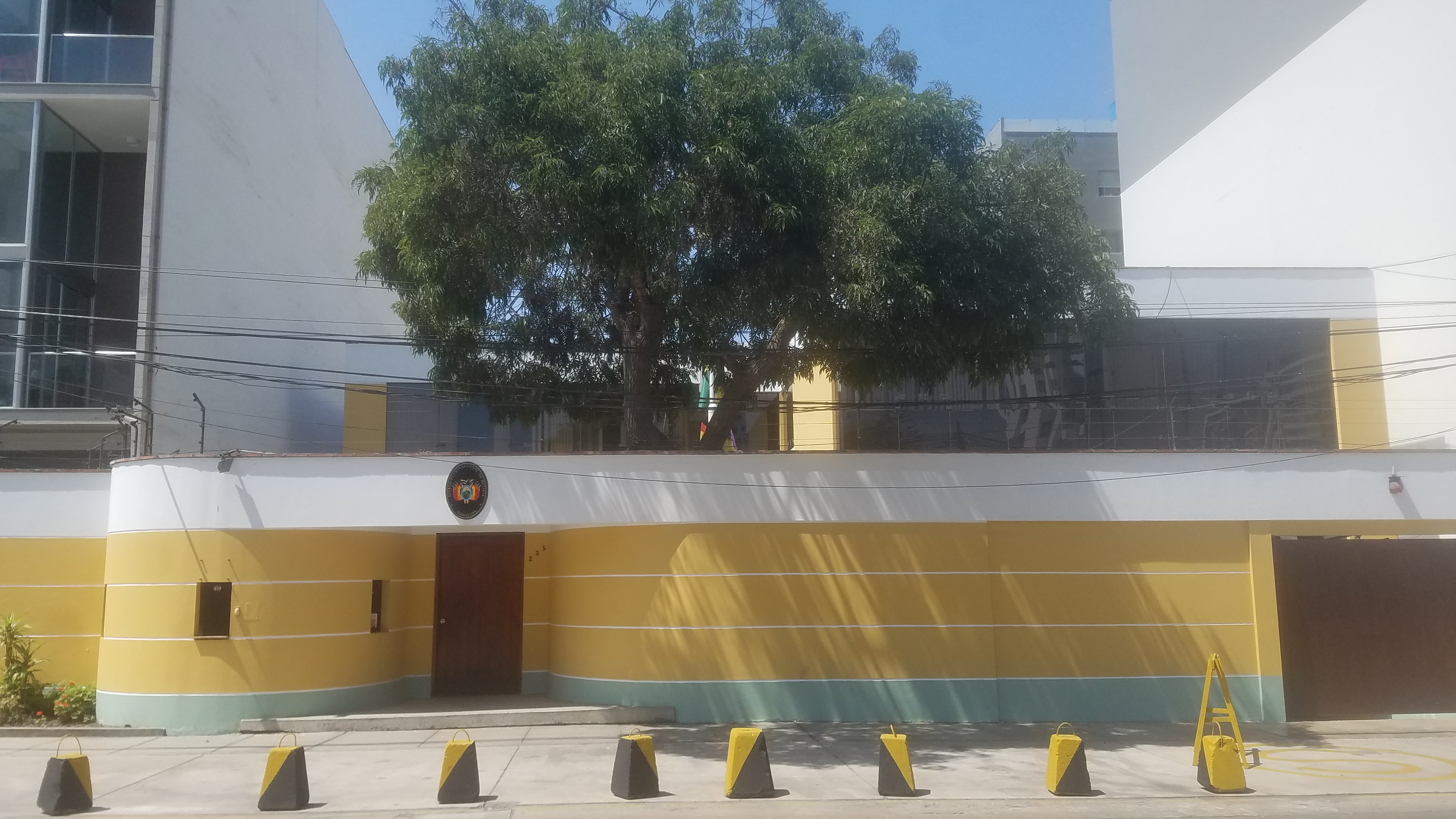
Embassy of Bolivia in Lima

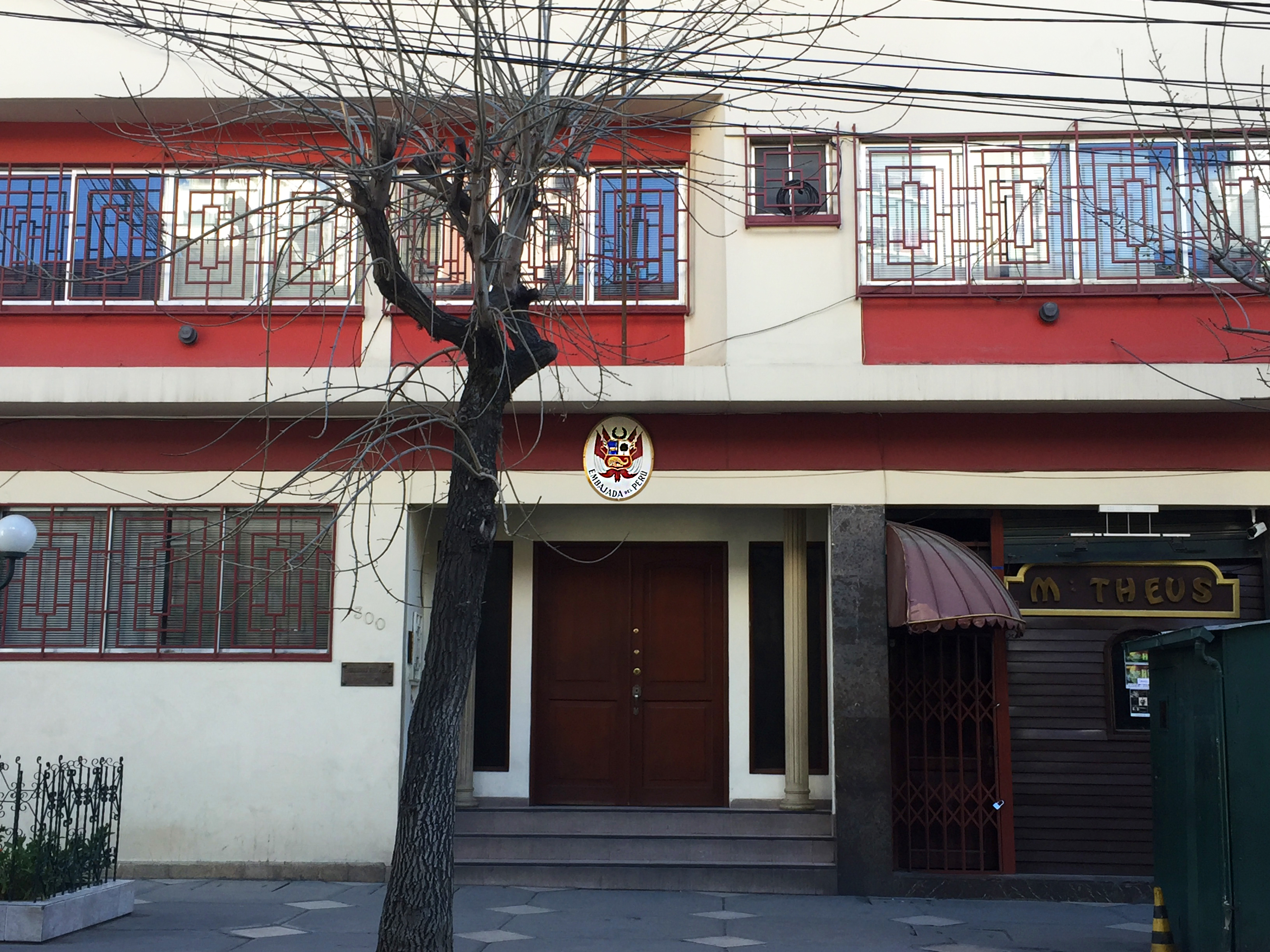
Embassy of Peru in La Paz

== See also ==
- Peru–Bolivian Confederation
- Treaty of Defensive Alliance (Bolivia–Peru)
- List of ambassadors of Bolivia to Peru
- List of ambassadors of Peru to Bolivia
- Foreign relations of Bolivia
- Foreign relations of Peru
