= Campaign of the Manuripi region =

1910 armed confrontation between Bolivia and Peru

Manuripi campaign
- Part of Bolivian-Peruvian territorial dispute and Acre dispute
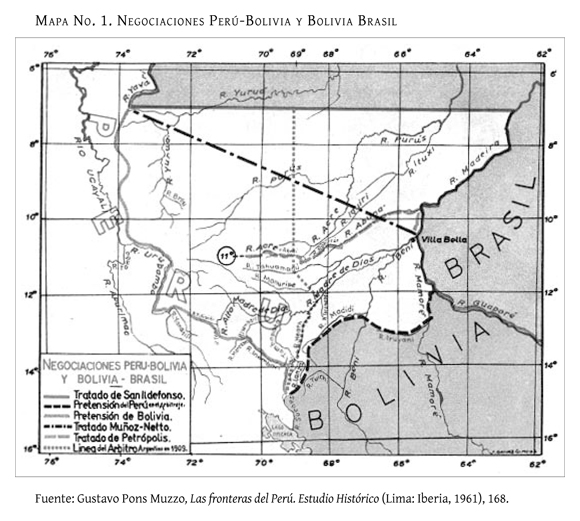
- Negotiations between Peru-Bolivia in the Amazon
Date	June–September 1910
Location	Near the Manuripi River
Result	Peruvian Forces victory; Withdrawal of the Bolivian Army.; Withdrawal of the Peruvian Army; Mandatory recognition by Bolivia of the Polo-Bustamente treaty given in 1909.
Territorial changes	Peruvian Republic obtains 250,000 km² recognises by Bolivia in the treaty and cedes 400km² to Peru

Belligerents
Bolivia; Supported by: Chile	Peru

Commanders and leaders
(Bolivia) Eliodoro Villazón > (Bolivia) Lino Echeverría †	(Peru) Augusto B. Leguía

Strength
1 detachment: 16 men	5th Infantry Regiment: 150 men & indigenous

Casualties and losses
11 killed & wounded War material captured Destruction of the fort	5 dead and 4 wounded •They also surrendered a captain, two lieutenants, and 17 soldiers as prisoners

The Manuripi campaign was an armed confrontation between Bolivians and Peruvians troops and a group of indigenous people in 1910. The Bolivian press has treated this conflict as "forgotten" due to the little importance with which it is taken in the country's history, perhaps due to the singularity of the confrontation, since a treaty had already been signed several months ago that awarded those territories to Peru.

At that time, the borders between Peru and Bolivia were not well defined, and the Argentine arbitration of July 9, 1909, caused tensions to rise. During this period, Bolivian Captain Lino Echeverría and 16 men remained in the small fortress of Avaroa on the Manuripí River. The Bolivians' arrest of a Peruvian smuggler heightened tensions, and on June 21, 1910, Echeverría repelled an attack by 25 Peruvians, with losses on both sides. This was followed by the Peruvian 5th Infantry Regiment, consisting of 180 men, 2 machine guns, and 20 canoes, landing at the confluence of the Manuripi and Mejahuirra rivers on July 22. Two months later, a force of 150 Peruvian and indigenous soldiers presented an ultimatum to the fort held by Echeverria. During the ensuing attack, Echeverria and three other Bolivian soldiers were killed while defending the fort, and several prisoners were taken.

== Legacy ==
In honor of Captain Echeverría, the "29th Infantry Regiment Cap. Lino Echeverría" was named in his honor in 1982.

There is a controversy over Captain Echeverría's presence in the region. Apparently, it had been several months since that territory (about 250,000 km²), had been recognized as Peruvian by the Bolivian government, according to the Border Rectification Treaty, in exchange for Peru recognizing Bolivian rights in 91,726 km^{2} (35,416 sq mi) in the Acre region.

According to the Bolivian point of view, this treaty —established on September 17, 1909— constituted a territorial victory for Lima since most of the disputed territory became part of Peru. A general agreement between Peru and Bolivia was obtained in 1909 and was parallel to the revision of the Titicaca line. A landmark of this discussion was the Argentine arbitration process between Bolivia and Peru. The Argentine mediation on the Peruvian and Bolivian titles in the Acre, was settled against Bolivia in the Treaty of 1909, the same year in which Brazil and Peru would also have their verdict about the distribution, among others, of spoils of the Acre by Brazil and Peru: in this case the arbitration trial agreed with Peru. All these events went unnoticed by Captain Echeverría Therefore, it is speculated that the captain was not informed of these diplomatic events between the two countries, which would explain his presence in the Manuripi.
