= Monument to Galdós (Madrid) =

Statue by Victorio Macho in Buen Retiro park, Madrid, Spain

Galdós
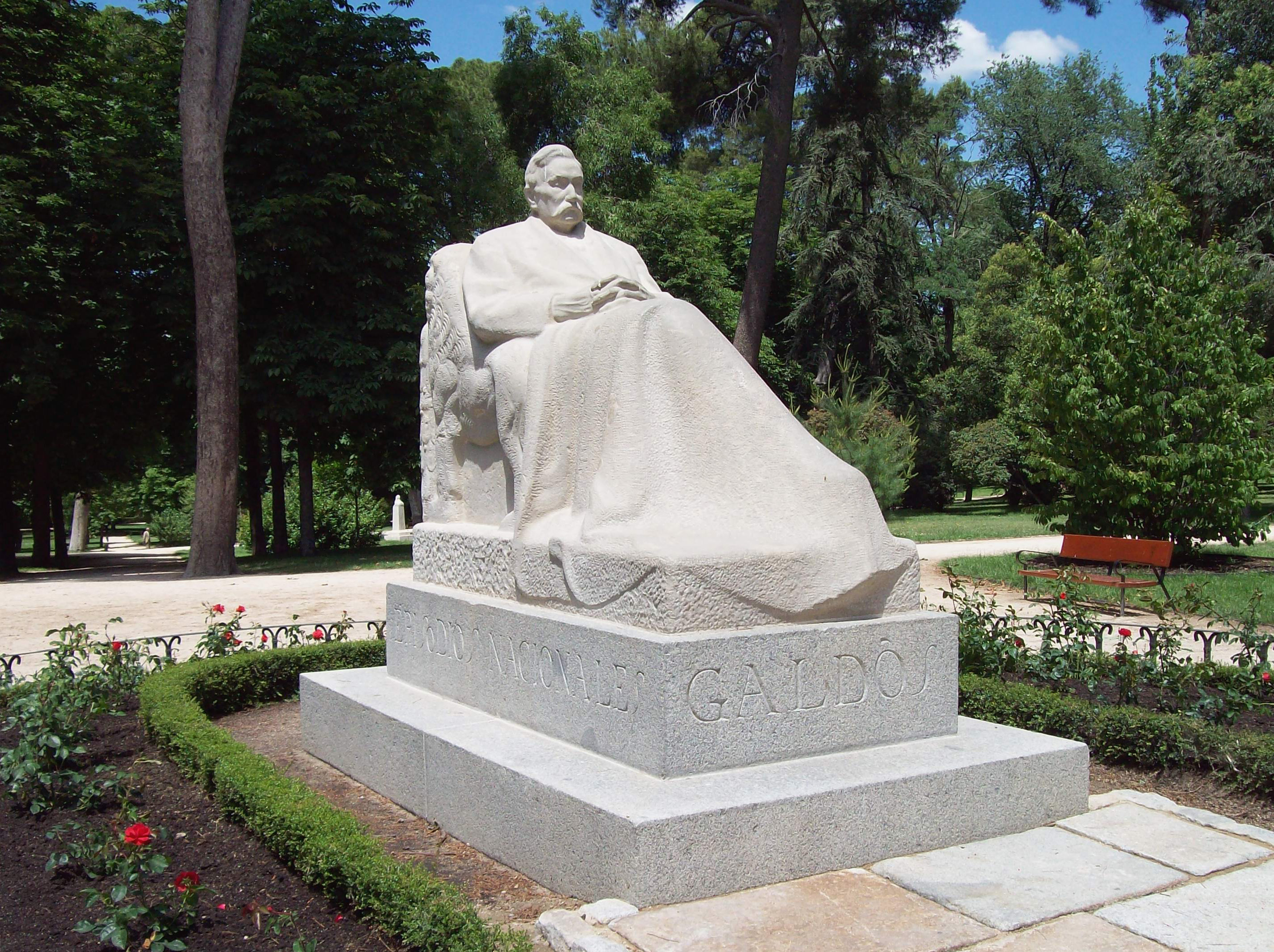
- 40.412069°N 3.680151°W
- Location: El Retiro, Madrid, Spain
- Designer: Victorio Macho
- Material: Granite
- Opening date: 20 January 1919
- Dedicated to: Benito Pérez Galdós

Galdós or the Monument to Galdós is a sculpture in Madrid, Spain. A work by Victorio Macho, it is dedicated to Benito Pérez Galdós. It lies on the southern part of El Retiro.

== History and description ==
An initiative of friends and admirers of the writer such as the Quintero brothers, José Francés, González Blanco and Emiliano Ramírez Ángel, in 1918 the project was entrusted to Victorio Macho, who had already carried out a study of the facial features of Galdós in the past. The material costs were funded via popular subscription.

The sculpture represents Galdós towards the end of his life, sitting on an armchair (with arms in the form of lions), with his legs covered by a blanket.

The monument was unveiled during an emotive ceremony on 20 January 1919, attended by Galdós himself. Tomás Borrás Bermejo, Emiliano Ramírez Ángel, Ramón Pérez de Ayala and Enrique de Mesa were among those in attendance. An ageing Galdós (he would die less than a year later)—ill of uremia and nearly completely blind—felt the statue with his fingers and told Macho: "Magnificent, my friend Macho. And he looks so much like me!".

The work brought fame to the then young Macho and boosted his incipient career.
