= Miguel Grau Avenue (Lima) =

Avenue in Lima, Peru

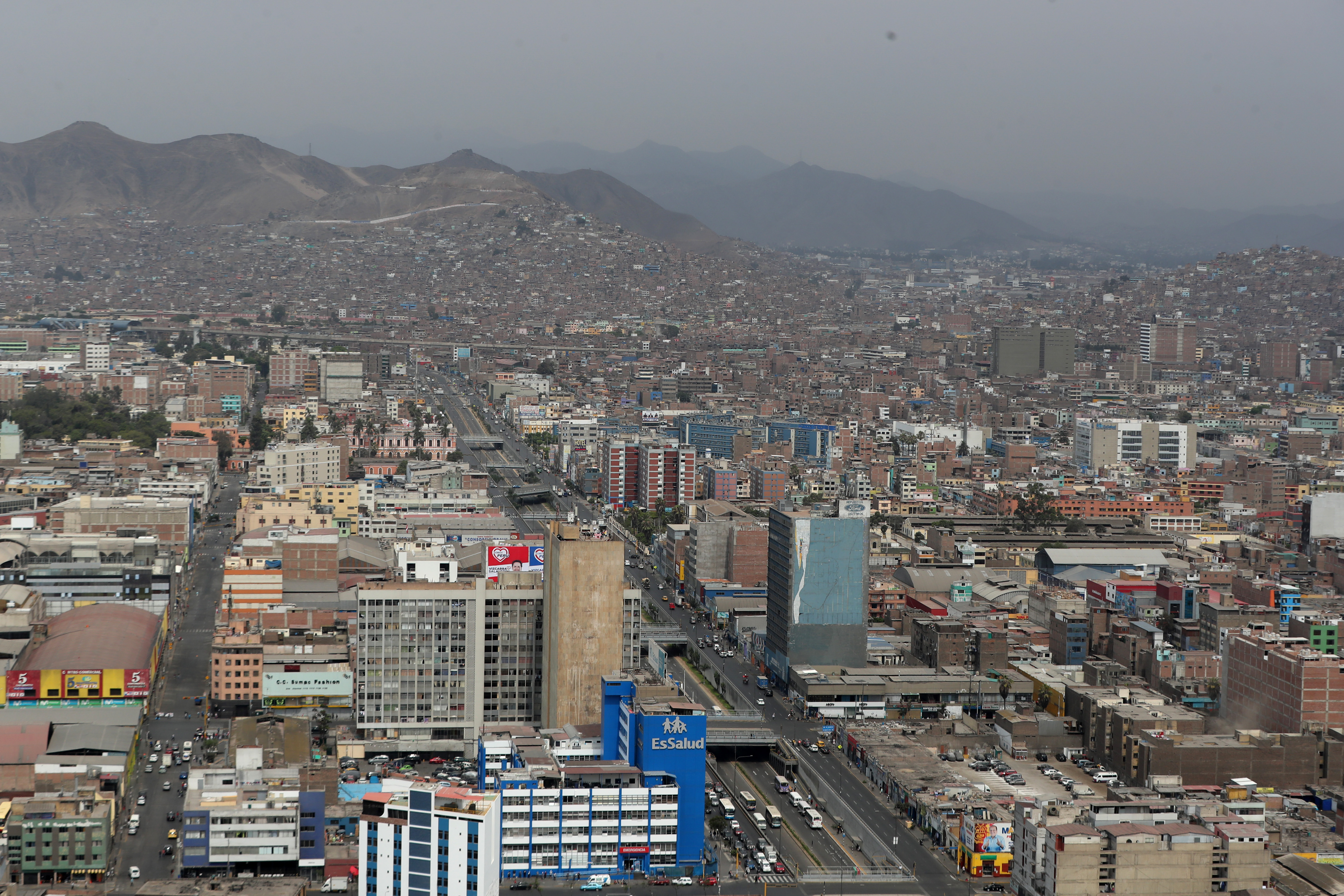
- Eastern view of the avenue (centre) in 2021
- Part of: Historic Centre of Lima
- Namesake: Miguel Grau
- From: Plaza Grau
- Major junctions: Avenida Abancay, Avenida Aviación, Avenida Nicolás Ayllón, Jirón Junín
- To: El Ángel Cemetery

Construction
- Completion: 1934

Miguel Grau Avenue (Spanish: Avenida Miguel Grau), formerly known as Alameda Grau, is a major avenue that forms part of the historic centre of Lima, Peru. It starts at the public square of the same name continuing the path laid out by the Paseo Colón, and continues until it reaches El Ángel Cemetery, passing through the districts of Lima, La Victoria and El Agustino. It partially overlaps the layout of the old walls of Lima.

== Overview ==
In 2006, the construction of the Grau Expressway was completed, whose extension covers 3 km. This expressway extends from Plaza Grau to Jirón Lucanas, and is intended for the exclusive transit of public transport units and feeder buses to the Metropolitano. The elevated viaduct of Line 1 of the Lima Metro crosses part of its central berm, in the section between Aviación Avenue and Locumba Street.

== See also ==
- Plaza Grau
