= Manuel Elías Bonnemaison =

Peruvian diplomat, last survivor of the battle of Angamos

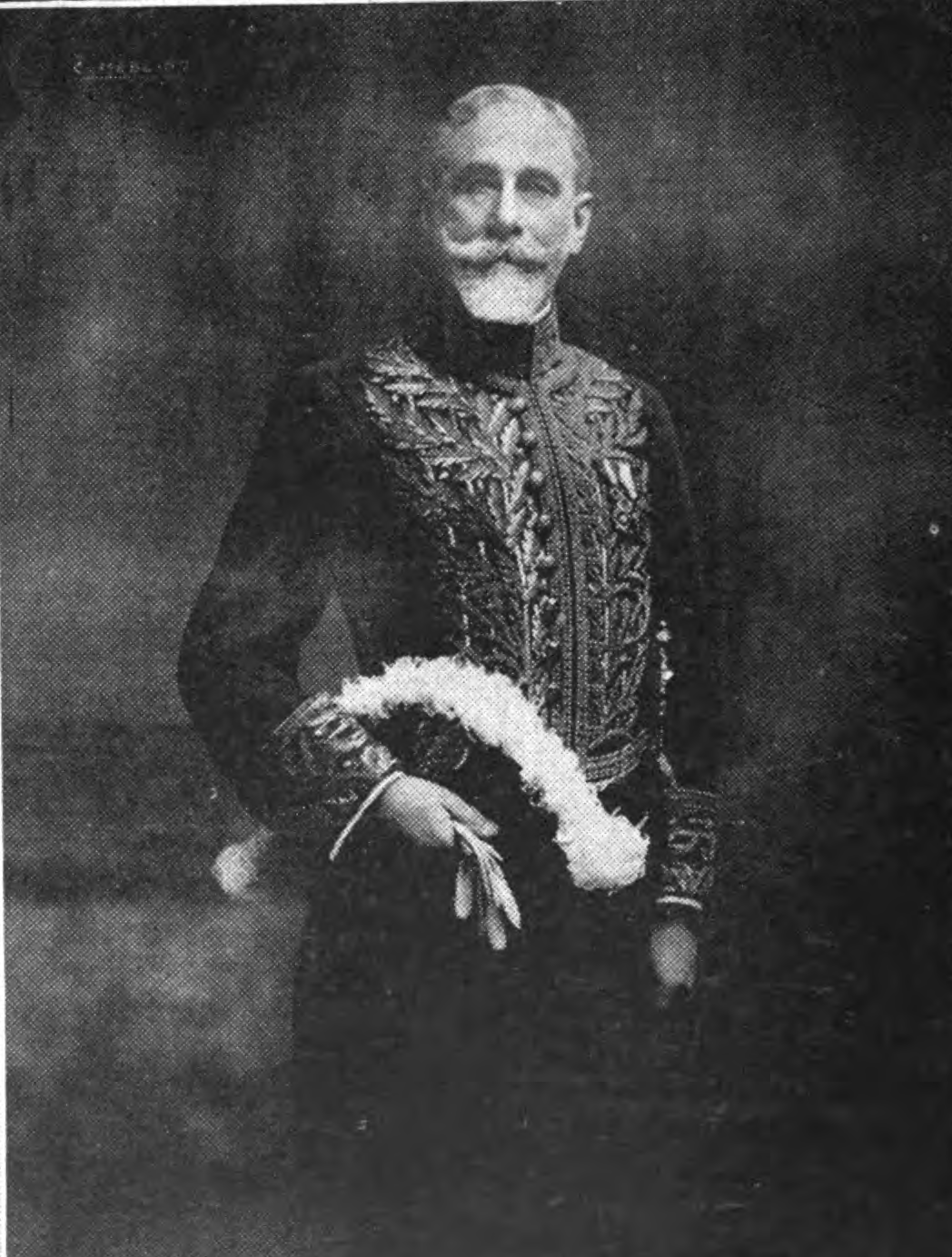

Ambassador of Peru to Japan and China
- In office August 9, 1929 – October 1936
- Preceded by: Manuel Freyre
- Succeeded by: Ricardo Rivera Schreiber

Ambassador of Peru to Bolivia
- In office 1923–1925
- Preceded by: Celso G. Pastor Chávarri
- Succeeded by: Pedro M. Olivera

Ambassador of Peru to Argentina
- In office 1914–1915
- Preceded by: Juan Norberto Eléspuru
- Succeeded by: Augusto Durand

Personal details
- Born: 27 March 1862 Lima
- Died: 17 February 1961 (aged 98) Lima
- Resting place: El Ángel Cemetery
- Spouse: Paulina Tarnassi
- Occupation: Diplomat
- Known for: Last survivor of the battle of Angamos
- Affiliations: Club Nacional; Club de la Unión

Military service
- Allegiance: Peru
- Branch/service: Peruvian Navy
- Years of service: 1879–1881
- Rank: Alférez de fragata
- Battles/wars: War of the Pacific: Battle of Angamos (POW); Capture of the steamer Rímac; Battle of Miraflores

Manuel Elías Bonnemaison Torres (Lima, March 27, 1862 – February 17, 1961) was a Peruvian sailor and ambassador. He was the last survivor of the battle of Angamos.

== Early life ==
Manuel Elías Bonnemaison Torres was the son of Gumercinda Torres and Juan Elías Bonnemaison, an engineer. He married Paulina Tarnassi, having children.

== Military career ==
He was a student at the Naval School, where he studied until obtaining the rank of Midshipman in 1879. He participated in the naval campaign of the War of the Pacific.

Embarked in the Huáscar, as an aspiring navy, he attended all the Huáscar raids up to the Naval Combat of Angamos. After Angamos, he remained a prisoner in Chile until January 1880. Returning to active service, he embarked on the capture of the steamer Rímac, assisting in the bombing of Callao and commanding the launches "Amo", "Urcos" and "Independencia". When the defense of Lima began, he was transferred to "El Pino" Hill, as head of the southern battery, attending the Battle of Miraflores.

== Diplomatic career ==
Years after the war, he studied engineering in Switzerland and served in the Peruvian legation in London. From 1904 to 1921 he was consul general in Buenos Aires and in 1929 minister plenipotentiary in China and Japan. From June 2, 1925, to August 9, 1929, he was Envoy Extraordinary and Minister Plenipotentiary in La Paz. In 1945 he was consul general second class in New Orleans.

In the last years of his life he was honored as the last survivor of Angamos, and due to him being a witness of the battle, he was considered as a primary source, although details were later found to be erroneous. He inaugurated the monument to his superior, Miguel Grau, in the square named after him in the centre of Lima.

== See also ==
- Miguel Grau
