= Bolivian–Peruvian territorial dispute =

Territorial dispute from 1825 to 1909

Bolivian–Peruvian Wars
- Part of the South American territorial disputes
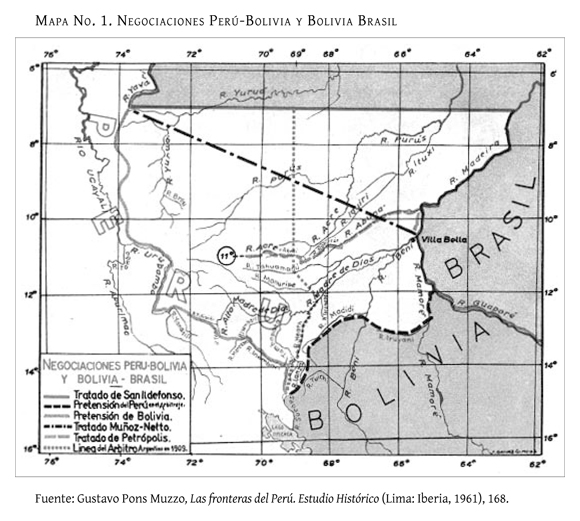
- Bolivian, Peruvian and Brazilian territorial claims, c. 1909
| Date | 6 August 1825 – 17 September 1909 (84 years, 1 month, 1 week and 4 days) |
| Location | Bolivia and Peru |
| Result | Polo–Bustamante Treaty is signed in 1909 |

Belligerents
| Bolivia | Peru |

Casualties and losses
| 1000 dead | 1200 dead |

The Bolivian–Peruvian territorial dispute was a territorial dispute between Bolivia and Peru that lasted from the former's independence in 1825 to the signing of the Polo–Bustamante Treaty in 1909.

== Spanish era ==
On November 20, 1542, in Barcelona, King Charles I of Spain ordered, by Royal Decree, the creation of the Viceroyalties of Peru and New Spain. On September 4, 1559, King Philip II created, as part of the Viceroyalty of Peru, the Real Audiencia of Charcas. Viceroy Diego López de Zúñiga y Velasco indicated the jurisdiction of this entity from the "city of La Plata with more than one hundred leagues of land around each part". Years later, new territories would be integrated, until its territory was defined "from Collao to the City of La Plata".

On August 1, 1776, the Viceroyalty of the Río de la Plata was provisionally created, segregating the Audiencia of Charcas from the Peruvian Viceroyalty, then commanded by Manuel de Guirior. In 1777, it was declared permanent, covering the current territories of Argentina, Bolivia, Uruguay, Paraguay, parts of southern Brazil and northern Chile.

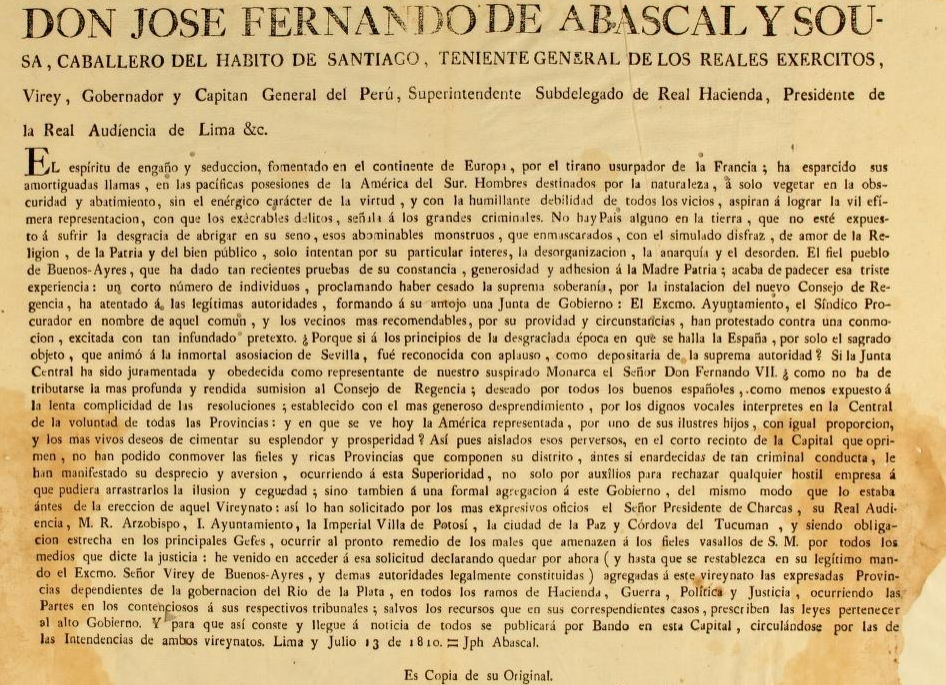
Order that annexes Córdoba and Charcas to the Viceroyalty of Peru

On May 3, 1788, the Real Audiencia of Cusco was created by Royal Decree with territories that corresponded to the Audiencias of Lima and Charcas, as well as territories from the Intendancy of Puno. On February 1, 1796, with another Royal Decree, the Intendancy of Puno became dependent on the Viceroyalty of Peru; thus also the districts of Paucarcolla and Chucuito, which until then corresponded to the Audiencia de Charcas, passed to that of Cusco.

After the May Revolution broke out in 1810, the Viceroy of Peru José Fernando de Abascal ordered, due the advance of the Junta de Buenos Aires on Córdoba de Tucumán and the Province of Charcas, the provisional annexation of those territories to the Viceroyalty of Peru.

After the abdication of Charles IV and his son Ferdinand VII, in favor of French Emperor Napoleon; government juntas were formed throughout Spanish America. Little by little, these boards loyal to Ferdinand VII were more radical in their ideas and voices began to emerge that strongly supported the break with the Peninsula.

After the wars of independence, it was proposed that the emancipated Latin American countries retain the borders of the year 1810, provisionally until the existence of a treaty, alleging the year 1810 as the last of the Spanish monarchy for the legitimate possession of their domains.

== Wars of Independence ==
On May 25, 1809, the city of Chuquisaca, then belonging to the Viceroyalty of the Río de la Plata, saw the eponymous rebellion take place that removed the president of the city's Royal Court, Ramón García de León y Pizarro, and formed a government junta. The movement, faithful in principle to King Ferdinand VII, served as a framework for the actions of the radical sectors that spread the rebellion to La Paz, both being brutally repressed by the Spanish forces.

After the deposition of the Viceroy of the Río de la Plata, Baltasar Hidalgo de Cisneros, and the assumption of the First Junta, the River Plate revolutionaries sent several expeditions to Upper Peru, in order to prevent the royalist advance on the north of the United Provinces and evict them from the Viceroyalty of Peru. However, they would be a failure: the royalists would continue to be a threat until 1825, after the battle of Ayacucho and the independence of Upper Peru.

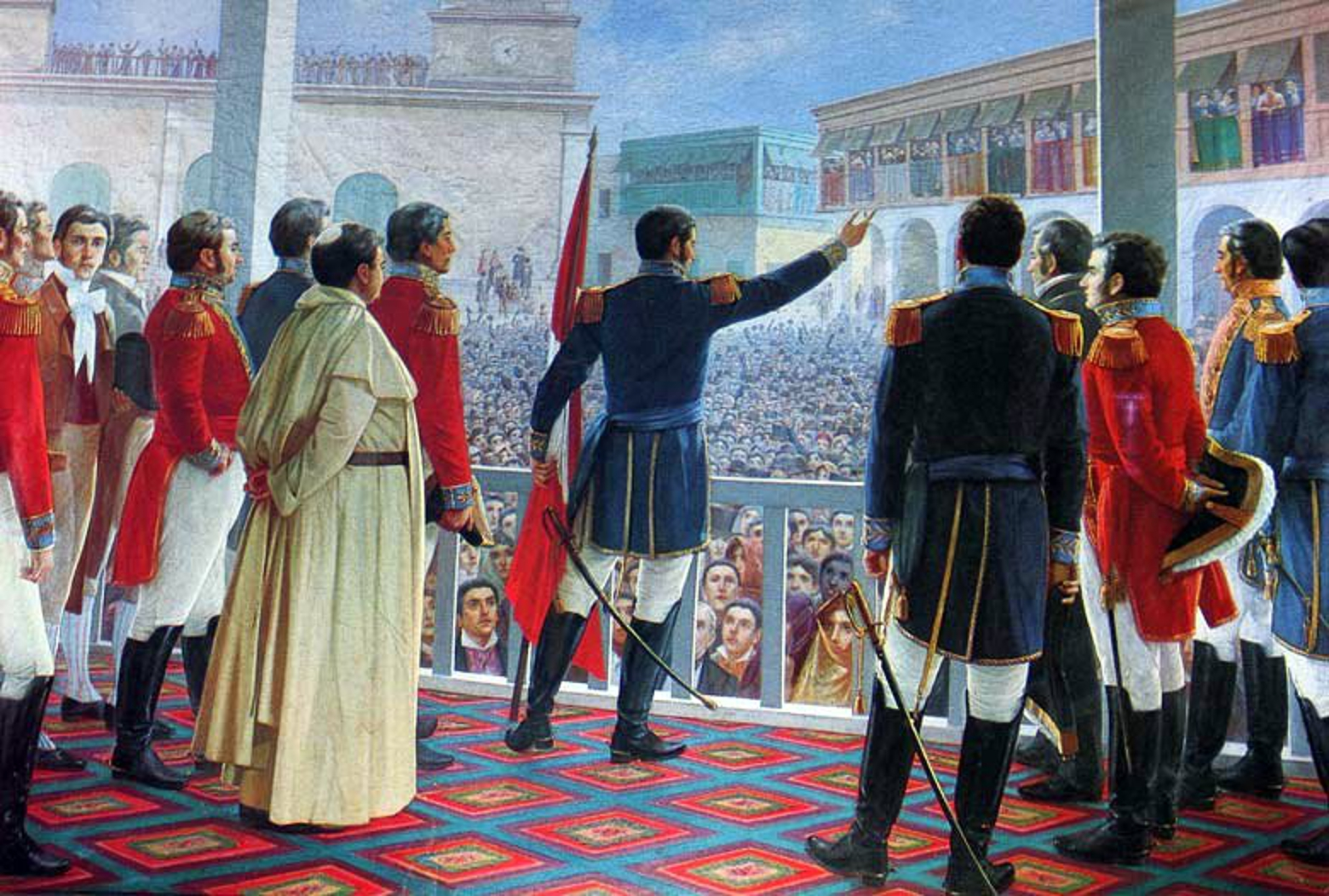
San Martín proclaims the independence of Peru. Oil painting by Juan Lepiani.

After the failure of the expeditions to Upper Peru, José de San Martín devised a plan to make the royalist stronghold in South America independent: the Viceroyalty of Peru, after liberating Chile, heading by sea to the Peruvian coast. On August 21, 1820, the Liberating Expedition of Peru embarked in Valparaíso, arriving in Pisco on September 7. After the withdrawal of the royalist Army from Lima, the Liberation Army entered this city on July 9, 1821. On July 15, the declaration was drafted and signed, and on July 28, 1821, General José de San Martín proclaimed independence in the Plaza Mayor of Lima.

From this moment Peru is free and independent by the general will of the peoples and by the justice of its cause that God defends. Long live the homeland!, Long live freedom!, Long live independence!

— José de San Martín

Despite having proclaimed its independence, much of the territory corresponding to the newly founded Peruvian state remained under royalist rule. Given the failure of the expeditions sent to fight the Spanish, the Peruvian Congress invited Simón Bolívar, president of Gran Colombia, to consolidate the independence of Peru. After several battles, on December 9, 1824, the royalists were definitively defeated in Ayacucho, and Viceroy José de la Serna was captured. Still remaining was an effective campaign in Upper Peru, where Pedro Antonio Olañeta, a Spanish general, remained. He would later be killed in action near the town of Tumusla on April 2, 1825, during the eponymous Battle of Tumusla.

After the Ayacucho campaign, Upper Peru could choose between belonging to either Peru or Argentina. Finally, on August 6, 1825, Upper Peru, with all its provinces represented, proclaimed its independence from Spain, becoming a new country, the State of Upper Peru.

== Bolivarian era ==
=== Treaty of Chuquisaca ===
Boundary Treaty
- Type: Border treaty
- Signed: 15 November 1826
- Location: Chuquisaca, Bolivia
- Signatories: Peru; Bolivia
- Languages: Spanish

Initially, Bolívar opposed the independence of Bolivia, trying to maintain its political union with Peru. Sucre, on the other hand, had the idea of concluding a boundary treaty between the two nations as soon as possible, including the port of Arica for the new republic. A similar opinion was held by the Peruvian José Faustino Sánchez Carrión, who addressed the Peruvian Congress to definitively resolve the limits between the two republics.

Peru recognized Bolivia as a sovereign nation and sent its plenipotentiary Ignacio Ortiz de Zevallos. On November 15, 1826, he signed a treaty with the Bolivian representatives Facundo Infante and Manuel Ureullu. In that agreement, Peru and Bolivia undertook to form a league that would be called the Bolivian Federation. In addition, the coastal border was established on the Sama river, for which Peru ceded the province of Tacna, being compensated by the province of Apolobamba/Caupolicán, the town of Copacabana and paying the amount of 5,000,000 pesos to the creditors from Peru:

The dividing line of the two Peruvian and Bolivian Republics, taking it from the coast of the Pacific Sea, will be the Morro de los Diablos or the cape of Sama or Laquiaca located at 18° latitude, between the ports of Ilo and Arica up to the port of Sama; from where it will continue through the deep ravine in the Sama Valley, to the Tacora mountain range: leaving the port of Arica to Bolivia, and the others included from 18° to 21° and all the territory belonging to the province of Tacna and others towns located south of this line.

The treaty was ratified by the Bolivian congress, but the Peruvian government, led by Andrés de Santa Cruz, did not approve it.

=== 1828 Peruvian–Bolivian War ===
On September 1, 1826, Bolívar withdrew from Peru. His influence in the country would definitively end on January 26 of the following year, with the uprising of the Colombian troops stationed in Lima, who would definitively return to their homeland months later.

However, Peru saw its independence threatened by the imminent war with Gran Colombia. Surrounded by the Colombian Army from the north and from the south in Bolivia, the Peruvian Army was not in an advantageous situation. However, the altiplano country already had seen clashes with the Colombians. President Sucre himself suffered an attack that injured him in the head and in the right arm.

Peruvian General Agustín Gamarra and his army entered Bolivia on May 1, 1828, with the "manifest intention" of "saving that country from the threat of anarchy" and protecting Sucre's life, although his real motive was to expel the Colombians and put an end to the Bolivarian predominance in said country, counting on the support of sectors of the Bolivian population. He met no resistance and triumphantly entered La Paz.

On July 6, 1828, a treaty was signed between generals Agustín Gamarra and José María Pérez de Urdininea, by which it was agreed, among other things, the withdrawal of the Gran Colombian troops from Bolivia and the resignation of the presidency by Sucre.

=== Gran Colombia–Peru War ===
After the fall of Sucre in Bolivia, Gran Colombia declared war on Peru on May 3, 1828. Several confrontations took place, culminating in the Battle of Cruces, which led to the Peruvian occupation of Guayaquil and the Battle of Tarqui. With the signing of the Treaty of Guayaquil, the conflict ended.

== Boundary negotiations and treaties ==
=== Ferreyros–Olañeta Negotiations ===
With distrust present and the belief that a Colombian danger was still latent, Peru sought an alliance with Bolivia and a boundary agreement, entrusting the negotiations to Mariano Alejo Álvarez in La Paz and Manuel Bartolomé Ferreyros, who dealt with Casimiro Olañeta in Arequipa. They failed. Shortly thereafter, Gran Colombia was dissolved.

=== Treaty of Tiquina ===
Preliminary Peace Treaty of Tiquina
- Type: Peace treaty
- Signed: 25 August 1831
- Location: Tiquina, Bolivia
- Signatories: Peru; Bolivia
- Languages: Spanish

With Gran Colombia now dissolved, and the threat perceived by Peru regarding its northern neighbour having come to an end, the tensions between Peru and Bolivia increased with the rivalries between Agustín Gamarra and Andrés de Santa Cruz, caudillos in both countries, respectively.

With the failure of the negotiations between Ferreyros and Olañeta, a war between both states was now imminent. However, between the Peruvian Pedro Antonio de La Torre and the Bolivian Miguel María de Aguirre, a preliminary peace agreement was reached in Tiquina on August 25, 1831, that prevented such a situation.

The treaty was then ratified in Lima by the Peruvian Congress on September 14 of the same year.

=== Treaty of Arequipa ===
Definitive Treaty of Peace and Friendship with Bolivia
- Type: Peace treaty
- Signed: 8 November 1831
- Location: Arequipa
- Signatories: Peru; Bolivia
- Languages: Spanish

Despite the Tiquina agreement, there was still rivalry between the two caudillos. However, thanks to the mediation of the Chilean plenipotentiary in Peru, Miguel de Zañartu, the Treaty of Arequipa was signed on November 18, 1831, with the same protagonists of the Treaty of Tiquina.

In this treaty, peace was assured between the two states and it was agreed to reduce Peru's army to 3,000 men and Bolivia's to 1,600. Neither of the two countries would intervene in the internal affairs of the other. The limits would be set by a mixed commission that would draw up the plan of the border and determine the changes and compensations of territories that were agreed upon. In the meantime, the current limits would be respected.

Likewise, a trade treaty was signed, in which equal rights were approved, navigation in Lake Titicaca was declared free and some articles necessary for the industry and agriculture of both countries were exempted. This last agreement was rejected by the Bolivian Congress, negotiating a new one, which was accepted.

=== Peru–Bolivian Confederation ===
In 1835, numerous internal wars turned Peru into a chaotic country. The country's president, Luis José de Orbegoso, made a pact with Bolivian president Andrés de Santa Cruz to unite the two republics in a confederation. The new country only existed for three years, until Santa Cruz was defeated in the fields of Yungay.

=== Treaty of Cuzco ===
Preliminary Peace Convention
- Type: Peace treaty
- Signed: 14 April 1839
- Location: Cuzco
- Signatories: Peru; Bolivia
- Languages: Spanish

The question of limits would arise again after the dissolution of the Peru–Bolivian Confederation. On April 14, 1839, a preliminary peace treaty was signed in Cuzco, signed by the Peruvian minister Manuel de Mendiburu and his Bolivian counterpart Eusebio Gutiérrez. The demarcation of limits would be done taking the Desaguadero river as a starting point.

The Governments of the Republics of Bolivia and Peru undertake to demarcate the limits of both, establishing the Desaguadero as a base, which is the natural boundary and the only one that will serve as the starting point for the operation.

— Preliminary Peace Convention, 1839

=== Peruvian–Bolivian War ===
The new president of Peru, Agustín Gamarra, tried to annex Bolivia, an objective that cost him his life in Ingavi in 1841. The Bolivian army, under the command of José Ballivián, invaded southern Peru, from Moquegua to Tarapacá until 1842.

The Bolivian Army did not have enough troops to maintain the occupation. Peruvian regular and irregular forces attacked the over-extended Bolivians and inflicted several defeats on them. The Bolivian troops evacuated Tacna, Arica and Tarapacá in February 1842, retreating towards Moquegua and Puno. Two more defeats at Motoni (March 20) and Orurillo (April 3) forced the withdrawal of the last Bolivian forces that occupied Peruvian territory, exposing Bolivia to an other invasion.

On June 7, 1842, a peace treaty was signed in Puno to end the war between Peru and Bolivia. The Chilean plenipotentiary Ventura Lavalle served as mediator. Both belligerents agree to forget the reasons for the war and some compensation was waived. No boundary issue was discussed.

=== Treaty of Arequipa (1847) ===
Treaty of Peace and Commerce
- Type: Peace and trade treaty
- Signed: 3 November 1847
- Location: Arequipa
- Signatories: Peru; Bolivia
- Languages: Spanish

The tension between Peru and Bolivia would last until 1847. That year, a clear boundary agreement was reached on November 3. On behalf of Peru, Minister Domingo Elías; for Bolivia, Miguel Maria de Aguirre. The border would be designated by a commission, adopting the rivers, lakes, mountains or arcifinio limits as boundaries. Both countries would make the necessary transfers and compensation of territories.

A commission will be appointed by both Governments to draw up a topographic map of their borders and another to draw up the statistics of the towns located within them, so that, without detriment to the two States, they can reciprocally make the transfers that are necessary to an exact and natural demarcation of limits. These must be rivers, lakes or mountains, in the event that neither Peru nor Bolivia refuse to make the disposals that are convenient to satisfy this object on the condition that they mutually provide the competent indemnities or compensations that are to the satisfaction of both parties.

— Treaty of Peace and Commerce, 1847

=== Treaty of Sucre ===
Treaty of Sucre
- Type: Border treaty
- Signed: 10 October 1848
- Location: Sucre
- Signatories: Peru; Bolivia

On October 10, 1848, by the Peruvian minister Cipriano Coronel Zegarra and the Bolivian Casimiro Olañeta, an agreement was signed in Sucre, revising the pact signed the previous year. In this treaty, it was stipulated that the limits would be those of the old landmarks, without any of the states making any transfer or compensation. The products of the Bolivian industry were extracted through the port of Arica and the merchandise that was imported through this port to Bolivia would be free of transit rights.

A commission will be appointed by both Governments to prepare a topographical map of their borders, with the aim of restoring one to another State the lands confused between the current borders, reestablishing for this purpose their old markings, in order to avoid doubts and confusions in hereinafter, and obliging both States to conserve the territory that has always belonged to them, and not to request or request any territory from the other, by alienation, compensation or any other reason of any kind.

— Treaty of Sucre

=== 1851 Treaty between Peru and Brazil ===
Fluvial Convention on Commerce and Navigation between the Republic of Peru and the Empire of Brazil
- Type: Border treaty
- Signed: 23 October 1851
- Location: Lima
- Signatories: Brazil; Peru

Full text
- es:Convención Fluvial sobre Comercio y Navegación entre la República del Perú y el Imperio del Brasil at Wikisource

On October 23, 1851, a fluvial convention was signed by Bartolomé Herrera (for Peru) and Duarte Da Ponte Ribeyro (for Brazil). In its eight article, the first section of the border of both countries was delimited: the Apaporis-Tabatinga line and the Yavarí River.

To prevent doubts regarding the mentioned Border, in the stipulations of this Convention; the high contracting parties accept the uti possidetis principle according to which the limits between the Republic of Peru and the Empire of Brazil will be fixed; Therefore, they recognize, respectively, as the border of the town of Tabatinga, and from Tabatinga to the North the straight line that will meet in front of the Yapurá River at its confluence with the Apaporis, and from Tabatinga to the South the Yavary River, from its confluence with the Amazon.

— 1851 Treaty between Peru and Brazil

When the Granadine government was made aware of this agreement, it ordered its minister in Chile, Manuel Ancízar, to raise a protest in April 1853; stating that it violated the Treaty of San Ildefonso of 1777.

The Bolivian position held that this treaty delimited the entire border between Peru and Brazil, implicitly accepting that the territory located between the source of the Yavarí and the trough of the Madeira belonged to its country, supporting its subsequent thesis of the border with Peru: the Yavarí-Inambari line.

On the contrary, the Peruvian position affirmed that the 1851 agreement only defined a part of the dividing line between its country and Brazil, in the known territories of the Amazon, admitting that it was a mistake not to complete the delimitation at that time, as His Foreign Minister José de la Riva Agüero pointed it out, at the end of the work of the Peruvian-Brazilian commission:

With the work of the demarcation commission appointed in accordance with article 3 of the 1851 treaty completed, one of the most important stipulations of that international pact has been fulfilled. There is, therefore, just reason for congratulations, both the Government of the Republic and that of H.M. Imperial for the result obtained for the good of both countries whose limits are thus fixed in a practical way and on the ground of the entire extension between the confluence of the Apaporis River in the Yapurá River and the Yavarí slopes. But Your Excellency is not unaware that the 1851 Treaty in regard to the demarcation of limits between the two countries is deficient; because, although it specifies them up to the indicated slopes, it says nothing beyond that point, leaving, therefore, the work of closing the picture with the empire until meeting the limits with Bolivia incomplete.

— Note from Peruvian Foreign Minister José de la Riva Agüero to Brazilian Plenipotentiary Filipe José Pereira Leal.

=== Ribeyro–Benavente Treaty ===
Treaty of Peace and Friendship
- Type: Peace treaty
- Signed: 5 November 1863
- Location: Lima
- Signatories: Peru; Bolivia

In 1853, a crisis occurred between Peru and Bolivia: the Peruvian diplomat Manuel Ortiz de Zevallos was expelled by Bolivian President Manuel Isidoro Belzu, due to his protests over the circulation of Bolivian currency in southern Peru. Given this, the Peruvian Congress authorized President José Rufino Echenique to declare war on Bolivia, ordering the occupation of the port of Cobija. The mediation of Chile and the start of the Peruvian civil war prevented the outbreak of the conflict. However, the tension between the two countries and the rupture of diplomatic relations would continue until 1863. On November 5 of that year, after several discussions, a treaty was signed between the Peruvian Foreign Minister Juan Antonio Ribeyro and the Bolivian plenipotentiary in Lima, Juan de la Cruz Benavente.

In this treaty, in addition to dealing with peace and friendship between the two states, it was agreed to appoint the commission to study the topographic map of the border and the limits that both republics had at the time were recognized, and the status quo should subsist, while the two countries presented their legal titles. Until then, it was not known to a fixed point which was the border claim of each one of them.

Both contracting parties, in order to remove any reason for misunderstanding between them, undertake to definitively fix the limits of their respective territories, naming within the term that is designated by mutual agreement after the exchange of the ratifications of the following Treaty, a mixed commission to draw up the topographic map of its borders and verify the demarcation, in accordance with the data and instructions that will be given in due time by both parties, and whose work will be taken into account for a boundary treaty that will be soon concluded later.

— Ribeyro–Benavente Treaty

=== Treaty of Ayacucho ===
In 1863, border discussions began between Brazil and Bolivia. That year, Costa de Rego Monteiro was accredited as Brazilian minister in La Paz, whom he proposed by a boundary treaty. However, the negotiations failed. They would restart in 1867, when Felipe Lopes Neto became the new Brazilian plenipotentiary in Bolivia. The treaty of friendship, limits, navigation, trade and extradition, was signed by Lopes Neto and Mariano Donato Muñoz on November 23, 1867. The point in dispute with Peru was the inclusion of the territories located between the Yavarí and the Madeira:

The border between the Empire of Brazil and the Republic of Bolivia will start from the Paraguay River (...) to the source of the Verde River; It will go down this river until it meets the Guaporé and through it and the Mamoré to the Beni, where the Madera River begins. From this river to the west, the border will follow along a parallel line, starting from its left bank at 10º 20' south latitude, until reaching the Javary River.

— Treaty of Ayacucho

The Minister of Foreign Affairs of Peru, José Antonio Barrenechea, protested this agreement before the Bolivian Foreign Ministry, formulating the corresponding reservations.

== Border commissions, colonization and arbitration ==
=== Treaty of Defensive Alliance ===
On February 6, 1873, due to the work of the Peruvian Foreign Minister José de la Riva Agüero and the Bolivian plenipotentiary in Lima, Juan de la Cruz Benavente, the Treaty of Defensive Alliance between Peru and Bolivia was signed.

=== Peruvian legislative resolution of February 5, 1877 ===
The Peruvian Congress issued a resolution on February 5, 1877, which declared:

The Congress, taking into consideration the need to indicate the limits of the Republic, has resolved: that the [Peruvian] Executive propose to the Bolivian Executive the appointment of a mixed commission to study and present, in the shortest possible time, a project of the most convenient demarcation of limits between both countries.

=== War of the Pacific ===
On February 14, 1879, the Bolivian city of Antofagasta was occupied by Chilean troops, and Bolivia invoked the 1873 treaty to request Peru's intervention in the conflict. Two months later, Chile declared war on Peru and Bolivia on April 5. After successive campaigns, the alliance was dissolved on May 26 in the fields of Tacna, leaving Peru alone with the responsibility for the war. The peace between Chile and Peru would be signed in Ancón, on October 20, 1883.

=== Del Valle–Carrillo Treaty ===
Preliminary Border Treaty Complementary Treaty Complementary Protocol
- Type: Border treaty
- Signed: 20 April 1884 (Preliminary treaty and complement); 24 April 1886 (Preliminary treaty and complement)
- Location: La Paz
- Signatories: Peru; Bolivia

On April 20, 1886, a preliminary boundary agreement was signed in La Paz between the Peruvian Plenipotentiary Manuel María del Valle and the Bolivian Foreign Minister Juan C. Carrillo. The appointment of demarcation commissions was stipulated. Clearly established borders would be maintained. The populations would always remain on the side of the nation to which they belonged. In the doubtful points the titles would be resorted to; in the absence of these, to equity; and in case of disagreement, to arbitration. This treaty was not fulfilled, as it was not ratified.

Las altas partes contratantes se obligan a nombrar y constituir respectivamente una comisión nacional, autorizada en debida forma, con el encargo de estudiar las fronteras de las dos repúblicas, y de fijarlas conforme a la justicia y al común interés de las partes.

— Del Valle–Carrillo Treaty

=== Bolivian colonization of the Purús and the Madre de Dios ===
On November 7, 1891, the Bolivian Congress issued a decree that accepted José Manuel Pando's proposal to explore the regions bathed by the Tequeje and Inambari rivers on 14° S, in addition to granting him 400 square leagues in that area; Alejandro Oporto was authorized to build a highway linking the Madre de Dios and the Acre; and to Antonio Quijano, navigation on the Purús and Madre de Dios and the construction of a railway between them.

The Peruvian minister in Bolivia, Enrique Zevallos y Cisneros, protested in March 1892 against those concessions made in Peruvian territory. He maintained that the Tequeje and the Madidi had constituted the ancient limit between Upper and Lower Peru, in addition to the fact that the acts of domination that Bolivia practiced in those territories would not diminish the rights of his country. The Bolivian Foreign Ministry responded that the concessions had been made to carry out the geographical studies that would facilitate the demarcation, and that, when the Yavarí headwaters were established in 1874, the Peruvian-Bolivian dispute had ended.

=== Treaty of Commerce and Navigation Between Peru and Brazil of 1891 ===
Treaty of Commerce and Navigation Between Peru and Brazil
- Type: Commercial treaty
- Signed: 10 October 1891
- Location: Rio de Janeiro
- Signatories: Brazil; Peru

On October 10, 1891, Peru and Brazil concluded a Treaty of Commerce and Navigation in Rio de Janeiro, the work of the Peruvian plenipotentiary Guillermo Seoane and the Brazilian Foreign Minister Justo Leite Chermont. In this agreement, the free navigation of the Yavarí River between the two states was established, in addition to other economic agreements. However, Bolivia protested against this agreement, saving its claimed rights over the left bank of the Yavarí.

=== Establishment of Bolivian customs in the Madre de Dios and the Purús ===
On October 2, 1896, the Bolivian government decreed the establishment of a customs office at the confluence of the Manu with the Madre de Dios. The Bolivian congress passed a law ordering the creation of customs on the Madre de Dios and Alto Acre, as well as the political and customs organization in the latter and the Purús.

Peruvian Foreign Minister Enrique de la Riva Agüero demanded the revocation of these measures, opposed to the 1863 treaty, which established the status quo. The response of the Bolivian plenipotentiary Claudio Pinilla was to allege the colonial titles in those regions; that is to say, that the regions of Moxos and Apolobamba, belonging to the Audiencia de Charcas, extended to the Madeira and Yavarí. In addition, he argued the acts of domination of Bolivia in those regions, practiced with the protest of Peru.

=== Polar–Gómez Treaty ===
Gómez–Polar Protocol on protocolization of all the conferences that will be held for this purpose
- Signed: 8 May 1897
- Signatories: Bolivia; Peru

In 1897, he Peruvian Foreign Ministry sent a mission entrusted to Carlos Rubén Polar, with full powers to negotiate a border agreement. Once the talks between Polar and Bolivian Foreign Minister Manuel María Gómez began, a modus vivendi was agreed upon.

The line drawn began at the point where the 69th meridian cuts the Purús River, following this meridian to San Francisco in Acre, descending to Palmares in the Madre de Dios, returning east to the intersection of the 13th parallel to the 69th meridian. , continued along that meridian until it found the Tequeje or the parallel that corresponds to its origins, and from there to the current limits. However, the Peruvian Foreign Ministry rejected it, considering it detrimental to the interests of its country.

=== Riva Agüero–Pinilla Negotiations ===
The Peruvian chancellor Enrique de la Riva Agüero delivered in April 1898 to the Bolivian plenipotentiary Claudio Pinilla a proposal on the bases of a mixed commission of studies, direct negotiations and arbitration from Spain in case of disagreement. However, the federalist project in Bolivia interrupted this negotiation, leaving the Riva-Agüero formula without effect.

=== Osma–Villazón Treaties ===
Treaty on Border Demarcation
- Signed: 23 September 1902
- Signatories: Bolivia; Peru

After the failure of the Polar mission, the Peruvian plenipotentiary Felipe de Osma y Pardo and the Bolivian foreign minister Eliodoro Villazón signed two agreements on September 23 and 30, 1902, on demarcation and arbitration in the question of limits. The Peruvian-Bolivian border was divided into two zones: one established by the river and one by the land. A demarcation commission was to set the milestones of the border of the land area, from the Peruvian territories occupied at that time by Chile to the Suches River. There was almost no discussion about this area, since they were traditionally known limits. By the arbitration treaty, it was submitted to the decision of the Argentine government to whom the territories of the river zone should belong, in accordance with the provisions and titles emanating from the Spanish power, in force in 1810.

The high contracting parties undertake to submit to arbitration all disputes pending to date and those that may arise between them during the validity of this treaty, whatever their nature and causes and provided that they have not been resolved by direct negotiations.

— Osma–Diez de Medina General Arbitration Treaty, 1901

=== Treaty of Petrópolis ===
While the Argentine government was analyzing the titles of Peru and Bolivia, the government of the latter country signed a treaty with Brazil, to set the limits between the two countries. Through this agreement, the highland country ceded 191,000 km^{2} of disputed territory with Peru.

The border between the Republic of Bolivia and that of the United States of Brazil will be established as follows: Starting from the South latitude of 20° 08' 35” in front of the outlet of the Bahía Negra, in the Paraguay River, (…) the source of the Arroyo del Bahía, will continue to descend through it, until its mouth on the right bank of the Acre or Aquiry River, and will rise through it to its source (...) to the border with Peru.

— Treaty of Petrópolis

=== Argentine arbitration ===
Pursuant to the 1902 treaty, both parties requested arbitration by the Argentine Republic. On July 9, 1909, the Argentine president, José Figueroa Alcorta, issued his arbitration award. Its publication gave rise in Bolivia to demonstrations against the Argentine Republic and Peru. At the same time, the Bolivian Foreign Ministry was prepared not to accept the ruling, submitted observations to the arbitrator, alleging that the arbitrator had not resolved the matter in accordance with the agreed principles of law, but rather in accordance with equity. So, Argentina broke off its diplomatic relations. Once again, Peru and Bolivia were about to go to war with each other.

== Polo–Bustamante Treaty ==
Border Rectification Treaty
- Type: Border treaty
- Signed: 17 September 1909
- Location: La Paz
- Signatories: Bolivia; Peru
- Languages: Spanish

The Polo–Bustamante Treaty, also known as the Polo–Sánchez Bustamante Treaty, was the border treaty signed in 1909 that ended the territorial dispute between Bolivia and Peru. It was signed in La Paz, on September 17, 1909, by the Minister Plenipotentiary of Peru, Solón Polo, and the Minister of Foreign Affairs of Bolivia, Daniel Sánchez Bustamante. President Augusto B. Leguía ruled then in Peru, and President Ismael Montes Gamboa in Bolivia, although many take Eliodoro Villazón Montaño into account as its main author.

With the signing of the treaty, Bolivia recognized Peruvian sovereignty over some 250,000 km^{2} located in the basin of the Madre de Dios River and the Purús River in the Amazon, in exchange Peru recognized the Bolivian sovereignty over the area of the Acre region located south of the homonymous river, which comprises 91,726 km^{2}. The dispute between both states had finally come to an end, with a minor escalation the following year due to a skirmish between both countries known as the Campaign of the Manuripi region.

== See also ==
- Bolivian–Chilean territorial dispute
- Chilean–Peruvian territorial dispute
- Colombian–Peruvian territorial dispute
- Ecuadorian–Peruvian territorial dispute

== Bibliography ==
- Angulo Puente Arnao, Juan (1927). Historia de los límites del Perú. Intendencia General de la Guerra.
- Basadre Grohmann, Jorge (2005). Historia de la República del Perú (1822-1933). Empresa Editora El Comercio S. A. ISBN 9972-205-62-2.
- Castelar y Cobián, Emilio (1902). Nuestros límites con la República de Bolivia (PDF). Librería escolar e Imprenta de E. Moreno.
- Díez de Medina, Eduardo (1909). El laudo argentino en el litigio Perú-boliviano (PDF). Imprenta Artística.
- Ministerio de Relaciones Exteriores de Bolivia (1909). El arbitraje entre las repúblicas de Bolivia y del Perú (PDF). Imprenta Artística.
- Paz Soldán, Carlos (1909). El laudo argentino en la Cuestión de Límites entre el Perú y Bolivia y la actitud de Chile (PDF). Imprenta Liberal.
- Paz Soldán, Mariano Felipe (1878). Verdaderos límites entre el Perú y Bolivia (PDF). Imprenta Liberal.
- Porras Barrenechea, Raúl (1926). Historia de los límites del Perú (PDF). Librería Francesa Científica y Casa Editorial E. Rosay.
- Porras Barrenechea, Raúl (1930). Historia de los límites del Perú (PDF). Librería Francesa Científica y Casa Editorial E. Rosay.
- Gran Historia del Perú. Empresa Editora El Comercio S.A. 2000.
- Tudela, Francisco (1909). La cuestión de límites entre el Perú y Bolivia (PDF). Tipografía de El Lucero.
- Zarco, José (1897). Cuestión de límites entre Bolivia y el Perú (PDF). Sociedad Geográfica de La Paz. Impresora y Litografía Bolivianas.
