= Jorge Escobari =

Bolivian politician (1926–2000)

Minister of Foreign Affairs
- In office May 11, 1979 – August 8, 1979
- President: David Padilla
- Preceded by: Raúl Botelho Gosálvez
- Succeeded by: Gustavo Fernández Saavedra

Personal details
- Born: September 3, 1926 La Paz, Bolivia
- Died: June 14, 2000 La Paz, Bolivia

Jorge Escobari Cusicanqui (La Paz, September 3, 1926 — June 14, 2000) was a Bolivian lawyer, diplomat, parliamentarian and politician, who served as foreign minister of Bolivia from May 11, 1979, to 8 August 1979, during the government of President David Padilla Arancibia.

== Biography ==
Escobari was born on September 3, 1926, in La Paz, where he did his primary and secondary studies. He continued with his higher studies by entering the law school of the Higher University of San Andrés (UMSA), graduating years later as a lawyer from where he would later teach law classes at the same university. Escobari was always characterized as a diplomat and intellectual, specialized in Bolivian historical and legal affairs, before working as a politician.

His diplomatic career began when in 1945 he held the position of secretary of the Peruvian embassy in Bolivia. Already during the governments belonging to the Revolutionary Nationalist Movement (MNR), Escobari held the position of chargé d'affaires of Bolivia in Brazil, he was twice ambassador of Bolivia in Colombia (1959, 1963–?), Peru (1971–1974, 1981–1983) and ambassador only once in Argentina (1979–1981) and Ecuador (1960–1963).

On May 11, 1979, during the government of President David Padilla Arancibia, Escobari was installed as foreign minister (chancillor) of Bolivia. In the country's foreign policy, he was characterized by his constant concern for the maritime claim on Bolivia's return to the sea with sovereignty. He was chancellor until August 8, 1979, the date on which President Padilla Arancibia handed over power to Walter Guevara Arze.

In 1989, the head of the Conciencia de Patria (CONDEPA) political party, Carlos Palenque Avilés, invited Escobari to accompany him as a candidate for vice presidency in the 1989 Bolivian general elections. The results gave CONDEPA third place in the voting at a national level. That same year, CONDEPA nominated Escobari for the position of Senator of Bolivia, representing the Department of La Paz, which won the seat.

Escobari was not nominated for re-election and distanced himself from CONDEPA to accompany Julio Mantilla in the creation of the MPP.

Among his main works are: Brasil y el Petróleo Boliviano (1961), El Aprovechamiento de las aguas del Titicaca (1961), El Derecho al Mar (three editions, 1964), Historia diplomática de Bolivia (1975, five editions) and Derecho diplomático boliviano (1985). He was a member of the Bolivian Academy of History.

After having remained for 48 years (1945–1993) in the public and political life of the country, Escobari decided to retire to private life. He died in the city of La Paz on June 14, 2000, at 74 years of age.
