= Juan Bravo (navy officer) =

Chilean Navy sailor

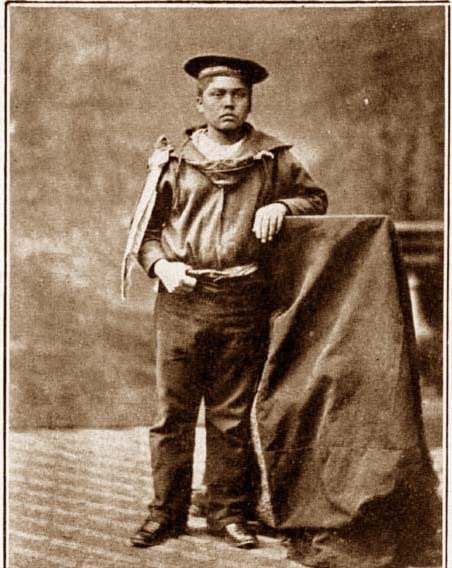
- Born: 1865; Arauco Province, Chile
- Died: Unknown
- Military career
- Allegiance: Chile
- Branch: Chilean Navy
- Rank: Cabin boy
- Conflicts: Battle of Punta Gruesa

Juan Bravo (1865–?) was a Chilean Navy sailor of Mapuche origin, hero of the naval Battle of Punta Gruesa during the War of the Pacific. Juan Bravo distinguished himself in the Battle of Punta Gruesa where he, while on board the schooner Covadonga, sniped down numerous Peruvians on board the ironclad Independencia.

== Early years ==
He was born in Llico (Arauco). His parents were both Mapuches, and the name of his father probably was Manuel Millacura. Juan escaped from home along with his friends when he was 12 years old. He changed his surname to Bravo and enlisted in the Chilean Navy as Cabin Boy in 1877.

== War of the Pacific ==
In 1879, the War of the Pacific broke out the war of Chile against Bolivia and Peru. The Cabin Boy Bravo was part of the crew of the schooner Covadonga, a ship that participated in the blockade of city of Iquique.

On May 21, 1879, two Peruvians ships, the monitor Huáscar and the armored frigate Independencia, arrived to Iquique with the intention of lifting the siege to the port. Both ships fought against the two Chilean ships in charge of the blockade: the wooden-hulled steam corvette Esmeralda and the schooner Covadonga, commanded by Captains Arturo Prat Chacón and Carlos Condell, respectively.

While the Esmeralda faced the Huáscar in the naval Battle of Iquique, the Covadonga headed south and moved towards the Cheurañete Bay, being pursued by the Independence frigate. Finally, the two containers met in the so-called naval combat of Punta Gruesa. Bravo climbed into the top of the mast of the Covadonga and used his Comblain rifle to contain the artillerymen of the Independence, killing 16 Peruvian sailors, leaving the cannon of the bow unused until the surrender of the Peruvian ship. Upon arriving in Valparaíso, he was rewarded for his participation in combat. At that time he was only 14 years old.
