= Prat =

Prat may refer to:

== People ==
- Alfonso Prat-Gay (born 1965), Argentine economist and politician
- Arturo Prat (1848–1879), Chilean naval officer
- Dolors Prat (1905–2001), Catalan trade unionist
- Domingo Prat (1886–1944), Spanish-born Argentinean guitarist
- Itamar Prat (1933–2025), Israeli poet
- Jean Prat (1923–2005), French rugby player
- José Prat (disambiguation), several people

== Places ==
- Villa Prat a small city in the O'Higgins Region in Chile
- Capitán Prat Province, the eighth-largest province of Chile, named after Arturo Prat
- Captain Arturo Prat Base, a Chilean research station in the South Shetland Islands, named after Arturo Prat
- El Prat de Llobregat, a municipality in Catalonia
- Prat, Côtes-d'Armor, a commune in the Côtes-d'Armor département in France
- Prat Island

== Institutions and business ==
- Arturo Prat University
- Prat de Punta Arenas
- PrAT (Ukrainian: Приватне акціонерне товариство), a type of Ukrainian legal entity, equivalent to private plc

== Ships ==
- See Chilean ship Capitán Prat

== See also ==
- Capitán Prat (disambiguation)
- Pratt (disambiguation)
