= Juan de Dios Aldea =

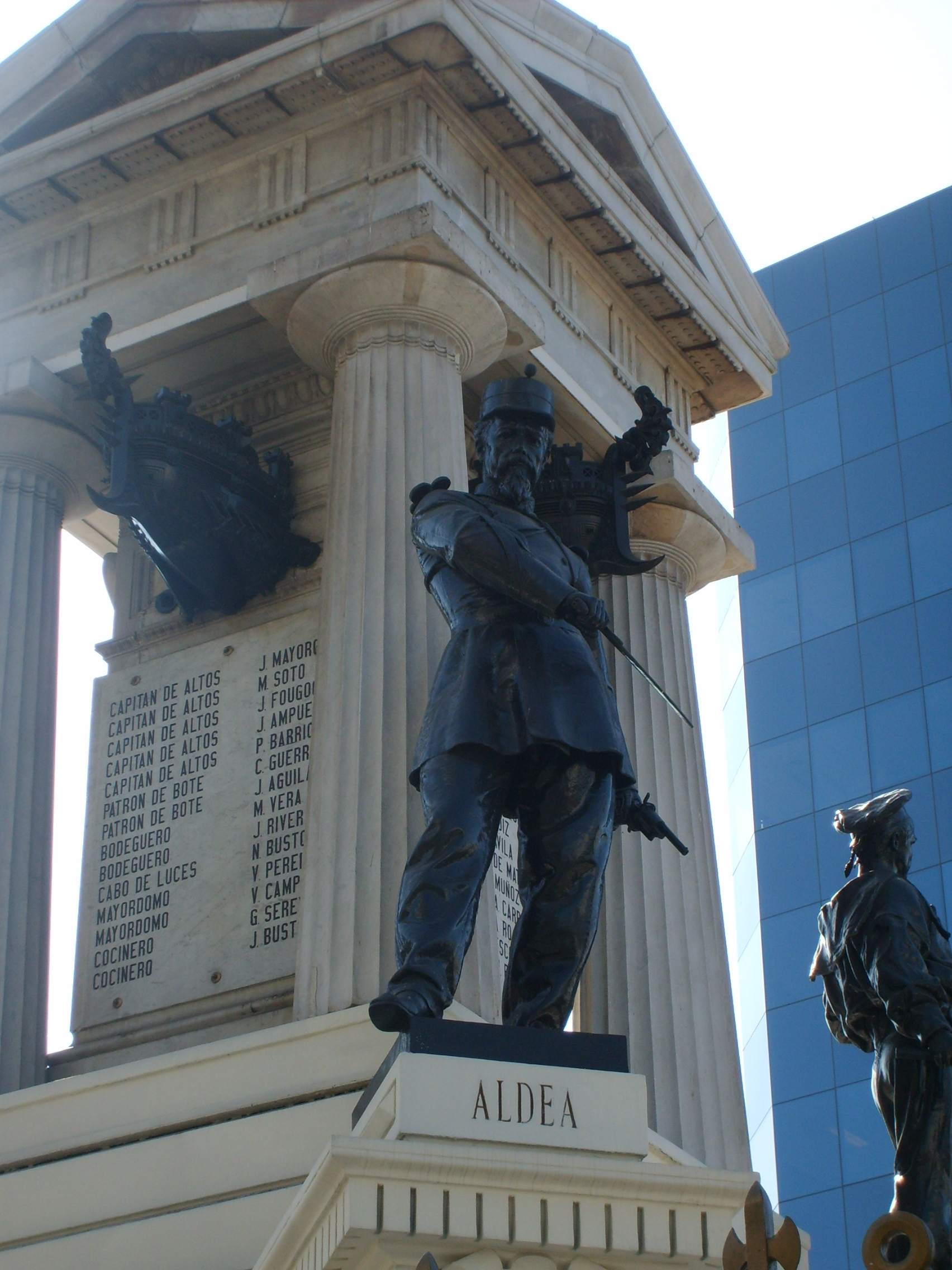
Statue of Juan de Dios Aldea on the Monument to the Heroes of Iquique, Valparaíso

Juan de Dios Aldea (1853–1879) was a Chilean marine. His remains rest in the crypt of the Monument to the Heroes of the Battle of Iquique, in Valparaíso.

== Early life ==
He was born to a modest family. He was the son of professor José Manuel Aldea and Ursula Fonseca. His childhood was spent in Santiago with his paternal grandparents, Juan de Dios Aldea and Maria Antonieta Contreras. At the age of eight, he enrolled in the Franciscan School of Chillán, directed by his father. Here he distinguished himself with his excellent handwriting and his evident interest for military exercises.

== Career ==
After living for four years with his aunt, on August 1, 1872, he enrolled as a volunteer soldier in the Financial Commission sent by the Navy's Artillery Battalion; an organization located in Valparaíso which was dependent on the General Command of the Chilean Navy. In this battalion, he also served as a chief.

He stayed in the First Company of that battalion for two years. In April 1874 he was sent on commission to Valdivia and on May 11 was promoted to 2nd Corporal.

On January 1, 1876 he was promoted to 1st Corporal, and a year later to 2nd Sergeant.

In June 1877 he embarked on the corvette Esmeralda. In February 1878 he was transferred to the pontoon Thalaba, and, after staying a month, he returned to the First Company of the Battalion. In October he was back in the Thalaba and in December returned to the Company of the Battalion, having transferred to the post of Guard of the Municipality of Valparaíso.

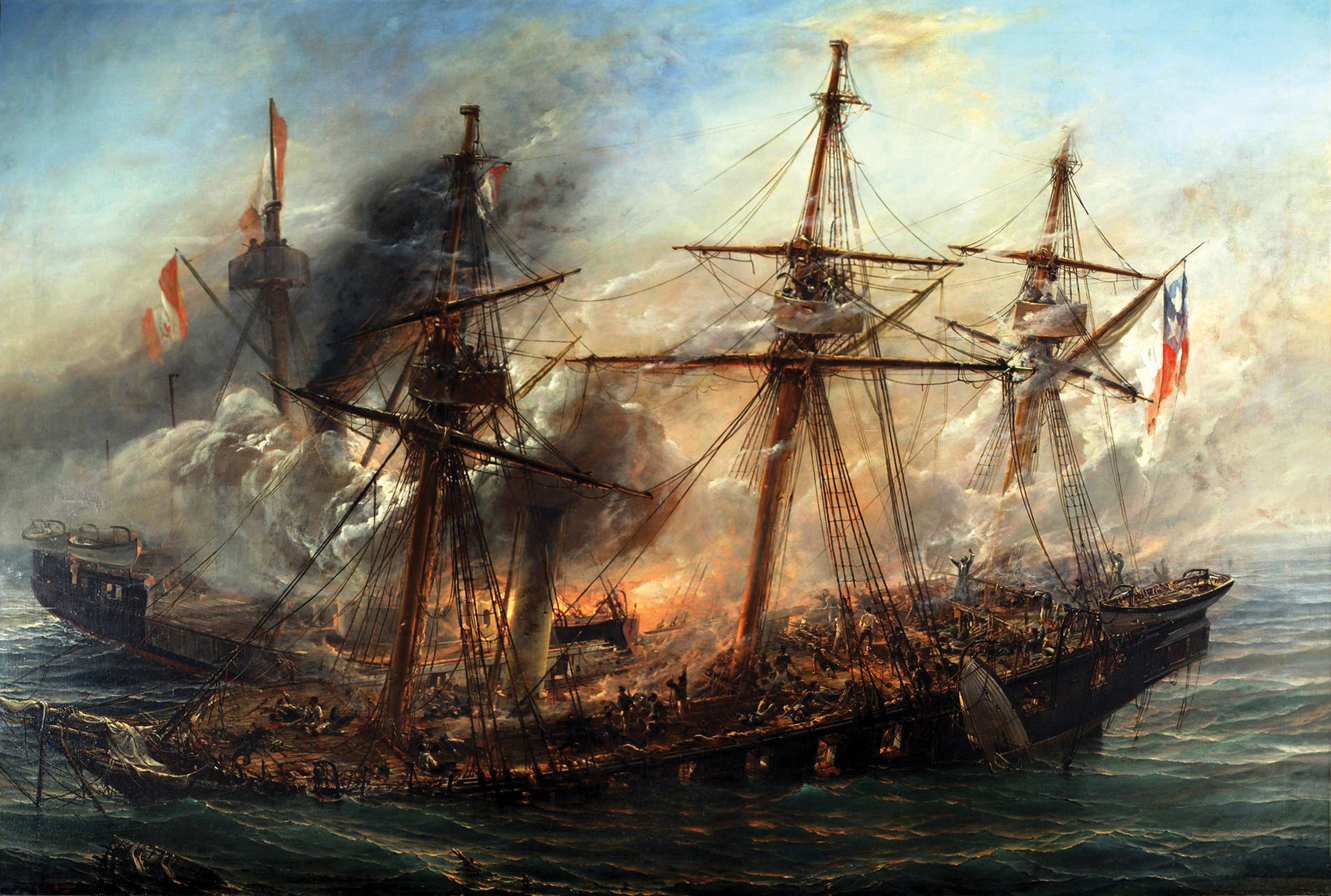
Naval Battle of Iquique during the War of the Pacific (1879–1884).

Due to his impeccable service record, upon the declaration of the War of the Pacific, he was assigned to the corvette Esmeralda.

On May 21, 1879, the Esmeralda, along with the Covadonga, blockaded the Peruvian port of Iquique. After the lookout of the Covadonga spotted the Peruvian ships Huascar and Independencia, Aldea joined the gunners and took over their combat post. After an hour of combat, the Peruvian Commander Miguel Grau Seminario ordered the Huascar to ram the Esmeralda.

== See also ==
- French ship Foudre (L9011)
- Arturo Prat
