= Juan Guillermo More =

Peruvian naval officer (1833–1880)

Juan Guillermo Moore
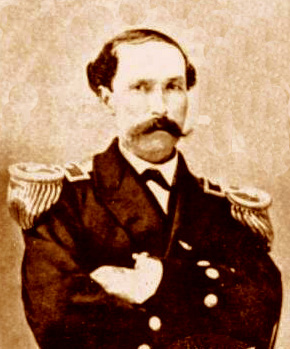
- Born: 27 February 1833; Lima, Peru
- Died: 7 June 1880 (aged 47) Arica, Peru
- Allegiance: Peru
- Branch: Peruvian Navy

Juan Guillermo Moore Ruiz (27 February 1833 – 7 June 1880) was a British Peruvian navy officer. He was killed during the Battle of Arica.

== Biography ==
Moore (spelled More in some texts) was born in Lima, the son of John Moore, a Scottish sailor and of Dolores Ruiz, a Peruvian lady. He joined the British Navy as an ensign in 1854. Later he returned to Peru and was commissioned in the Peruvian Navy. He served in the frigates Apurímac, Izcuchaca and Huaraz, as well as the Guise and the pontoon Iquique.

In 1866, during the Chincha Islands War, he was appointed commander of the corvette Unión. A few months later, Captain Moore took a Peruvian Navy crew to the United States to bring the ironclad Atahualpa to Peru. The monitor sailed from New Orleans, La. in early January 1869 arriving in Peru in June 1870. As a reward, he was appointed as commander of the frigate Independencia and in 1877, General Commander of the Southern Fleet. As such he directed the actions to recapture the monitor Huáscar which had been captured by Nicolás de Piérola and had rebelled against the central government.

During the War of the Pacific between Chile and Peru, he was appointed commander of the strongest unit of the Peruvian Navy, the armoured frigate Independencia. As such, he participated in the Battle of Punta Gruesa on 21 May 1879, when his ship crashed with a submarine rock while pursuing the Chilean schooner Covadonga, commanded by Captain Carlos Condell. He was rescued from his sinking ship, imprisoned in Arica and court martialled by his own comrades. He was dismissed from the navy and forbidden to ever wear his uniform again. He decided to continue the war as a simple civilian, in order to regain his lost honor. On 27 February 1880, during the Naval Battle of Arica, while in command of the Manco Capac, he successfully disabled the captured Huascar killing her commander Captain Manuel Thomson. During the siege of Arica, he was in charge of the batteries of the Cape, where he was killed during the Battle of Arica.
