= Battle of Punta Gruesa =

1879 War of the Pacific battle

- Part of the War of the Pacific
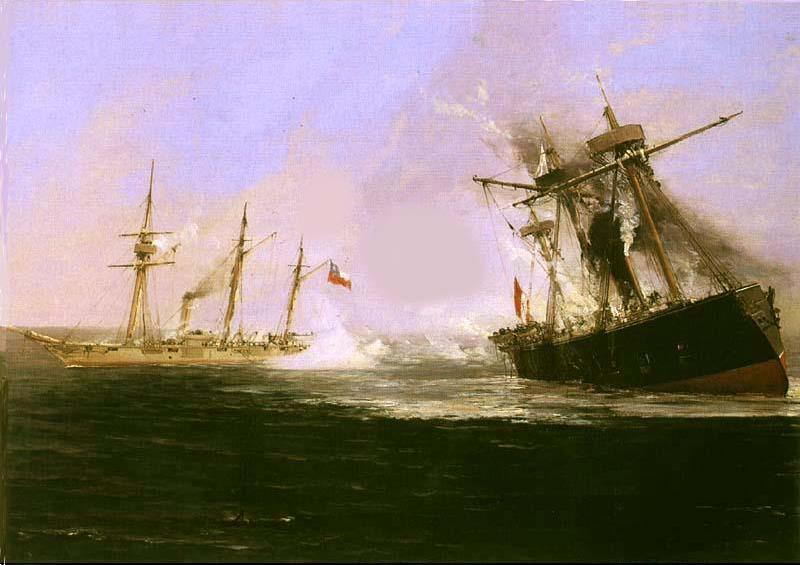
- Naval Combat of Punta Gruesa; The stranding of the Independencia oil on canvas Thomas Somerscales
Date	May 21, 1879
Location	near Iquique, Peru (present day Chile)
Result	Chilean victory

Belligerents
Chile	Peru

Commanders and leaders
(Chile) Carlos Condell	(Peru) Juan Guillermo More

Strength
1 schooner	1 ironclad

Casualties and losses
3 dead 5 wounded	5 dead 5 wounded 1 ironclad lost

The Battle of Punta Gruesa was a naval action that took place on May 21, 1879, during the War of the Pacific between Chile and Peru. This may be labelled as the second part of the Naval Battle of Iquique, which occurred on the same day, although it is described in many sources as a separate battle.

== History ==
During the first year of the war, Chilean war efforts were focused on destroying the Peruvian Navy, since the Chileans understood the strategic importance of sea domination. This was meant to enable the Chilean Navy to help the army conquer Bolivian and Peruvian territories with troop landings and port blockades without interference.

During May 1879, the main ships of the Chilean Navy were sent towards the Peruvian port of Callao in order to destroy its navy, while two old, wooden ships, the corvette Esmeralda and the Covadonga, commanded by Captain Arturo Prat and Captain Carlos Condell respectively, were left blockading the Peruvian port of Iquique.

However, as the Chilean Navy steamed north towards Callao, two ironclad ships of the Peruvian Navy steamed south from Callao, undetected. These ships were the monitor Huáscar and the armoured frigate Independencia, commanded by Captain Miguel Grau and Captain Juan Guillermo More, respectively.

=== History ===
On the morning of May 21, 1879, the lookout of Esmeralda spotted two ships coming from the north. These were the Peruvian Independencia and Huáscar. Condell noticed the Independencia was moving separated from the Huascar, realizing their plan was to close both Chilean ships in the port and attack from the distance, so he ordered to run south to keep both Peruvian forces divided. The Covadonga headed south while the Esmeralda kept the defense at the port, as it had engine problems making her difficult to maneuver. The battle had begun: Huáscar engaged Esmeralda and Independencia pursued Covadonga south. Many sources (Peruvian mostly) say Condell attempted to escape the Iquique battle, but that can't be the case as the Covadonga had half the speed of the Independencia, making it unlikely for the Covadonga to escape to Antofagasta.

Captain Carlos Condell of the Covadonga realized that the quicker but heavier Independencia had a deeper draft than his schooner, the reason why he decided to run south very close to the coast, risking to run his ship aground. With Independencia in pursuit, both ships exchanged fire. The Independencia's lack of trained gunners and the Covadonga's accurate sniper fire prolonged the chase for over three hours. Chilean-Mapuche sniper Juan Bravo was hailed after the battle for taking down numerous Peruvians. Captain More of the Independencia, tired because of the prolonged pursuit, lost his temper and patience, deciding to take a riskier approach and ram the Chilean ship. Constantly sounding the depth, he attempted to do so twice, only to have to call off the attack when approaching the shallows. Close to Punta Gruesa, a shallow cove, Covadonga scraped and barely cleared a reef. The Independencia, attempting to ram for a third time, struck the obstacle and immediately took on water while listing to starboard. The Covadonga then turned around and opened fire, while Independencia's crew returned fire and tried to float her off the reef.

As Captain More realized his ship was lost, he ordered her scuttled, but the magazine was already flooded and it could not be blown up. The Covadonga kept firing, as the crew of the Independencia resisted to surrender. When they finally raised the white flag, Condell's men were preparing the boats to take prisoners, but then they saw the Huáscar coming from the north, so they decided to run south to Antofagasta. Huáscar's commander checked on Independencia and decided to pursue the enemy after seeing she was immobilized, but this cost precious time and Covadonga steamed south as fast as possible. Captain Grau realized that Huáscar could not catch up on the 10-mile (16 km) head start before dusk, gave up the chase, and returned to assist Independencia and salvage her guns; the crew (those aboard and some who had escaped to the beach) were rescued and the ship set on fire.

The Peruvians lost 5 crew with 5 wounded; 3 Chilean crewmen were killed and 5 wounded.

=== Aftermath ===
The naval battle of Punta Gruesa was a Peruvian defeat. One of the most powerful warships in the Peruvian Navy was lost, while Chile only lost one of its oldest wooden warships.

== Commanders ==
Commanders
Schooner Covadonga	Ironclad Independencia
Carlos Condell de la Haza	Juan Guillermo More

== Forces ==
Technical characteristics	Schooner Covadonga	Ironclad Independencia
Commissioned	1859	1866
Displacement (t)	412 t	3,300 - 3,750 t
Draught	3,35 m	6,62 m
Armor (mm)	None	114.3 mm
Naval artillery	2 x 70 lb	1 x 250 lb, 3 x 150 lb, 12 x 70 lb, 2 machine guns
Speed (Knot)	4 kn	11 kn
Crew	130 men	375 men

== See also ==
- Battle of Iquique
- Battle of Angamos
