= Judge Pratt =

Judge Pratt may refer to:

- Charles Pratt, 1st Earl Camden (1714–1794), judge of the Court of Chancery for England and Wales
- George C. Pratt (born 1928), judge of the United States Court of Appeals for the Second Circuit
- John H. Pratt (1910–1995), judge of the United States District Court for the District of Columbia
- Philip Pratt (1924–1989), judge of the United States District Court for the Eastern District of Michigan
- Ralph Pratt (born 1940), judge of the Pennsylvania Courts of Common Pleas
- Robert W. Pratt (born 1947), judge of the United States District Court for the Southern District of Iowa
- Tanya Walton Pratt (born 1959), judge of the United States District Court for the Southern District of Indiana

== See also ==
- Justice Pratt (disambiguation)
