= Pratt (disambiguation) =

Pratt is a family name.

Pratt may also refer to:

== Education ==
- Pratt Community College, a two-year junior college in Pratt City, Kansas
- Pratt Institute, a private art college in New York City, New York
- Pratt School of Engineering, the engineering school of Duke University, in Durham, North Carolina

== Places ==
- Pratt, Kansas, a city
- Pratt County, Kansas, a county
- Pratt, Minnesota, an unincorporated settlement in Steele County
- Pratt, Missouri, an unincorporated community
- Pratt Mountain, a mountain in south-central New Hampshire
- Pratt, West Virginia, a town
- Pratt Junction, Wisconsin, an unincorporated community
- Pratt's Bottom, Greater London, England

== Libraries ==
- E.J. Pratt Library, University of Toronto, Ontario, Canada
- Enoch Pratt Free Library, Baltimore, Maryland, United States

== See also ==
- Justice Pratt (disambiguation)
- Knuth–Morris–Pratt algorithm
- Prat (disambiguation)
- Pratt & Whitney
- Pratt knot
- Pratt truss bridge design
