= Carlos Condell =

Chilean naval officer

Carlos Arnaldo Condell De La Haza
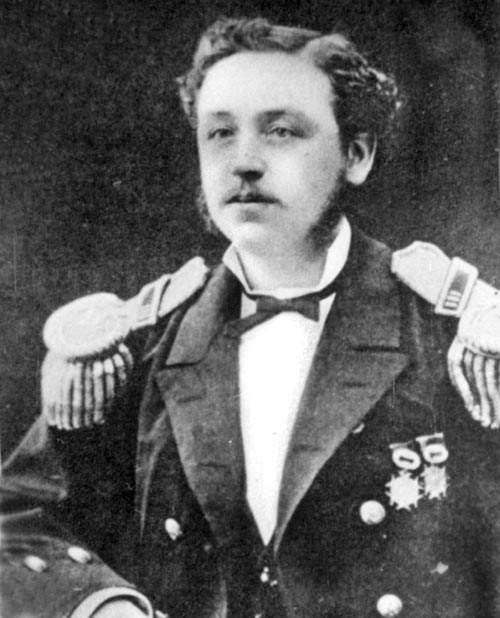
- Born: August 14, 1843; Valparaíso, Chile
- Died: November 24, 1887 (aged 44); Quilpué, Chile
- Military career
- Allegiance: Chile
- Branch: Chilean Navy
- Service years: 1861 - 1887
- Rank: Rear Admiral
- Commands: Covadonga
- Conflicts: Battle of Punta Gruesa

Signature
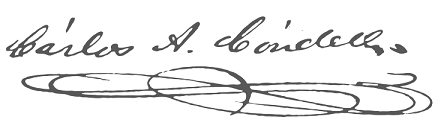

Carlos Arnaldo Condell de la Haza (August 14, 1843, in Valparaíso – November 24, 1887, in Quilpué) was a Chilean naval officer and hero of the Battle of Punta Gruesa during the start of the War of the Pacific.

Possessing a great sense of strategy and analysis in battle, he was always underestimated by the contemporary media due to his Peruvian origin (on his mother's side). His victories in unbalanced conditions were decisive to the triumph of Chile in the War of the Pacific.

== Early years ==
Carlos Condell was born August 14, 1843, in Valparaíso, Chile. His father was the Scottish merchant marine Federico Condell, and his mother was the Peruvian aristocrat Lady Manuela De la Haza. His uncles were Diego and Antonio de la Haza, both rear admirals of the Peruvian Navy. Therefore, he had several cousins who were Peruvian naval officers. Condell did not have familial ties to Chile, and this fact resulted in ostracism and criticism during his life.

He was the sixth of ten children. His first and second brothers were born in Peru.

He studied in Valparaíso, first at the Colegio de los Sagrados Corazones (School of the Sacred Heart) between 1849 and 1854, and then at the Colegio Inglés (English School).

== Military career ==
At the age of fifteen (July 29, 1858), Condell joined the navy as a cadet, forming part of the renowned Curso de los Héroes (Class of the Heroes) together with Arturo Prat, Juan José Latorre, Jorge Montt and Luis Uribe. Three years later (July 15, 1861), Condell achieved the rank of officer cadet (guardiamarina in Spanish).

=== First years of service ===
His first naval engagements were the Battle of Papudo (November 26, 1865) and the Battle of Abtao (February 8, 1866) in the Spanish-Chilean War, in which he fought allied with Miguel Grau and other Peruvian officers, who would become Condell's enemies the next decade.

In April 1867, Condell decided to withdraw from the Chilean Navy and become a merchant. He opened a store in Valparaíso which only lasted for 7 months: he returned to the navy and was assigned to the ship Esmeralda.

In December 1868, he participated in the honorable mission to return the remains of Bernardo O'Higgins back to Chile. Later, he served in the ships Abtao and Chacabuco. In the following years, he sailed to the islands of Juan Fernández and to the south of Chile. Ending 1876, aboard the Corvette Esmeralda, he travelled to Easter Island and Tahiti.

=== Civilian hiatus ===
In March 1872, Carlos Condell again decided to withdraw from the navy, seeking again the merchant life of his father, but his business never achieved good results. In Valparaíso, he met a young woman of only 16 who became his future wife, Matilde Lemus Valdivieso. They married on September 26, 1877. They had four children.

In March 1876, after four years of civilian life, he returned to the navy and again was assigned to the ship Esmeralda (1855).

=== War of the Pacific ===
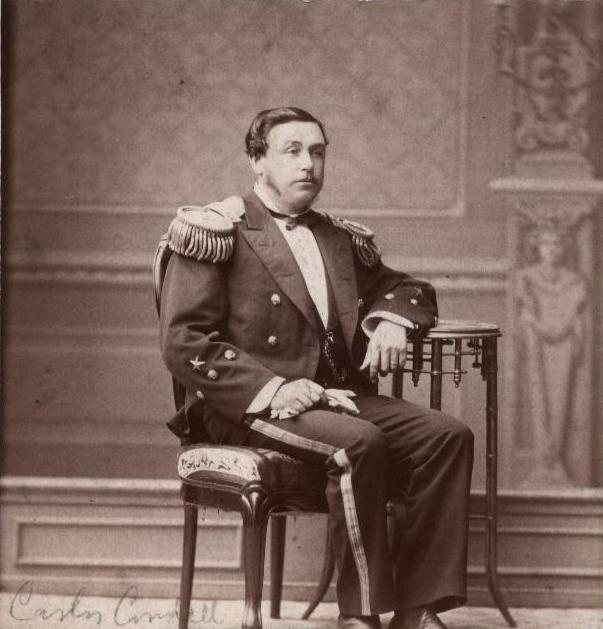
Condell in 1880

At the beginning of the War of the Pacific (April 5, 1879), Condell was already promoted to corvette captain in charge of the corvette Abtao, and was commissioned the blockade of the port of Iquique, a Peruvian possession at that time.

The next month, Condell was in charge of the schooner Covadonga, together with Arturo Prat, in charge of the slightly larger corvette Esmeralda, two of the older ships in the Chilean navy. They were left behind by the rest of the fleet heading to the main Peruvian port of El Callao to attempt a definitive assault.

On May 21, these small ships engaged the Peruvian armoured frigate Independencia and the monitor Huáscar (respectively). While Prat lost his battle and died heroically in Battle of Iquique, Condell managed to escape to the south, pursued by the Independencia (captained by Juan Guillermo More), which possessed size and firepower in this encounter. Nevertheless, Condell managed to pin the enemy ship into the coastal reef, bombard back, and get away while the monitor Huáscar showed in the shipwreck scene to assist the trapped crew of Independencia.

After this battle, the balance in the War of the Pacific was broken, since only the Huáscar remained as a menace to the Chilean naval power. Condell was promoted to frigate captain and set in charge of the gunboat Magallanes.

On November 2, 1879, Condell participated in the assault and takeover of the port of Pisagua, the blockade of Arica, and afterwards, the combat against the fortresses of the same city and the ship Manco Capac. In 1880, he took charge of a well-known enemy ship captured in the Battle of Angamos: The Huáscar. He used the monitor to siege and block the port of El Callao and other conflicts of the War of the Pacific. The rejection and animosity among the Peruvian people was on the rise due to several combat encounters in which Condell emerged triumphant.

Exactly three years after the battles of the Iquique and the Punta Gruesa (May 21, 1881), Condell was promoted to captain, and sent to Europe in December. He returned in 1884, when the War of the Pacific ended in Chile's favor.

== Last years ==
In 1884 Condell was designated as an aggregate of the Ministry of the Seas (Ministerio de Marina) and put in charge of the armoured frigate Cochrane as Commodore.

Starting in 1887 he was transferred to the frigate Blanco (on April 4), where he assumed the position of chief of the national navy, a position he had to leave due to a serious disease. Nevertheless, on August 17 he was promoted to the rank of rear admiral (Contraalmirante in Spanish).

Carlos Condell died in Quilpué, on November 24, 1887, at the early age of 44. His remains were carried to the Crypt of the Naval Heroes (Cripta de los Héroes Navales) in Valparaíso.
