= Pratley =

Pratley is a surname. Notable people with the surname include:

- Brooke Pratley (born 1980), Australian former rower
- Darren Pratley (born 1985), English footballer
- Nils Pratley (born 1967), British journalist
- Philip Louis Pratley (1884–1958), English-born Canadian bridge designer
- Susan Pratley (born 1984), Australian international netball player

== See also ==
- Prat (disambiguation)
- Ratley
