= Juan Bravo (disambiguation) =

Juan Bravo (c. 1483–1521) was a leader of a 16th-century revolt in Spain.

Juan Bravo can also refer to:

- Juan Bravo (athlete), Chilean long-distance runner
- Juan Bravo de Medrano (1650–1710), Count of Santa Rosa
- Juan Bravo Murillo (1803–1873), Spanish politician
- Juan Bravo (navy officer) (1865–?), Mapuche-Chilean sniper
