= Capitan Prat =

Capitan Prat usually refers to Chilean navy officer Arturo Prat. It may also refer to:

- Capitán Prat Province, Chile
- Captain Arturo Prat Base, a Chilean research station in the South Shetland Islands
- Chilean ship Capitán Prat, several ships with the name
