= Antonio de la Haza =

Peruvian Navy Admiral

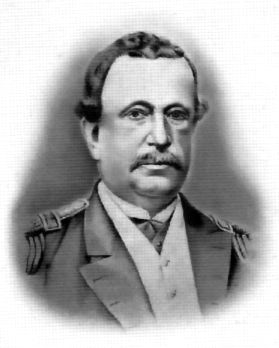
- Born: Antonio Ambrosio de la Haza Rodríguez; December 27, 1825; Paita, Peru
- Died: November 24, 1891 (aged 65); Lima, Peru
- Years active: 1841–1891

Antonio Ambrosio de la Haza Rodríguez (December 27, 1825 – November 24, 1891) was a Peruvian sailor. He was commanding general of the Navy (1878-1879).

== Biography ==
Son of the ship captain Manuel de la Haza Martínez and Ana María Rodríguez.

At the age of 13 he began sailing in the merchant navy, traveling to Mexico and Chile. In 1841 he joined the navy, serving aboard the brig Constitución, and later on the corvette Yungay.

He was already a second lieutenant when he embarked on the schooner Alerta, but shortly after he was discharged for political reasons and exiled to Central America (1843).

In 1845 he was readmitted, serving aboard the schooner Vigilante. And in 1846 he went to the schooner Libertad.

In 1849 he was serving on the brig General Gamarra when the ship was sent to the coast of California to protect Peruvian citizens during the gold rush. He remained on the Gamarra until 1851, when he was entrusted with command of the steamship Titicaca, and was promoted to first lieutenant.

In 1852 he returned to the schooner Libertad. In 1854 he began commanding the schooner Héctor, as lieutenant captain.

In 1853 he took command of the brig Almirante Guise and in 1858 he was already a frigate captain. He participated in the blockade of Guayaquil, during the Ecuadorian Campaign (1858–1859).

In 1868 he was already rear admiral and commanding general of the Squadron. In 1872 he traveled on assignment to Europe and the United States.

During the second constitutional government of Mariano Ignacio Prado he was Minister of War and Navy (1877) and Commander General of the Navy (1878–1879), being the successor of the ship captain Miguel Grau.

During the Pacific War, he participated in the defense of Callao against the blockade of the Chilean squadron, where his nephew Carlos Condell served. He married Micaela Campos Gorostidi; daughter of Felix María Campos and Josefa Gorostidi Seminario who remarried General Antonio de la Guerra Montero.

== Sources ==
- Arosemena Garland, Geraldo (1979): El Almirante Miguel Grau (7 edición), p. 127. Lima-Perú: Banco de Crédito del Perú
- Basadre Grohmann, Jorge: Historia de la República del Perú (1822–1933). Tomo 7, p. 215. 9.ª edición. Editada por la Empresa Editora El Comercio S. A. Lima, 2005. ISBN 9972-205-62-2
- Ortiz Sotelo, Jorge – Castañeda Martos, Alicia (2007): «Haza Rodríguez, Ambrosio Antonio de la». En Diccionario Biográfico Marítimo Peruano, pp. 134–135. Asociación de Historia Marítima y Naval Iberoamericana (ed.). Lima: Impreso por Jhire Grafel S.R.L. ISBN 978-9972-877-06-3
