= José Prat =

José or Josep Prat may refer to:

- José Prat (anarchist) (1860s–1932), Catalan anarchist, writer, and syndicalist theoretician
- José Prat (politician) (1905–1994), Spanish politician and lawyer
- Josep Prat i Bonet (1894–1936), Catalan leader of Argentine Esperantist movement
- José Prat Piera (1898–1987), Spanish politician, lawyer, and journalist
- José Prat Ripollés (1911–1988), Spanish association football player and coach
