= Chilean ship Capitán Prat =

Several ships of the Chilean Navy have been named Prat or Capitán Prat after Arturo Prat, commander of the Chilean ship Esmeralda (1855) during the War of the Pacific

- Chilean gunboat Capitán Prat (1880), a ship ordered by Chile but finally purchased by Japan
- Chilean battleship Capitán Prat (1890)
- Chilean cruiser Capitán Prat (CL-03)
- Chilean destroyer Capitán Prat (DLH-11)
- Chilean frigate Capitán Prat (2006) FFG-11, a Jacob van Heemskerck-class frigate, the former HNLMS Witte de With (F813) transferred to Chile in 2006
- Chilean frigate Capitán Prat (2020) FFG-11, an Adelaide-class frigate, the former HMAS Newcastle transferred to Chile in 2020

== See also ==
- Capitan Prat (disambiguation)
