= Justice Pratt =

Justice Pratt may refer to:

- Abner Pratt (1801–1863), associate justice of the Michigan Supreme Court
- Daniel Pratt (New York politician) (1806–1884), justice of the New York Supreme Court and ex officio a judge of the New York Court of Appeals
- Eugene E. Pratt (c. 1892–1970), associate justice of the Utah Supreme Court
- Orville C. Pratt (1819–1891), associate justice of the Oregon Supreme Court
