= Peruvian ironclad Independencia =

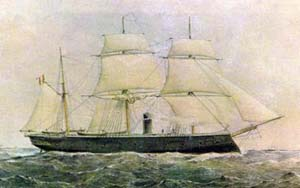
- Independencia in 1866

History

Peru
- Name: Independencia
- Ordered: 1 March 1864
- Builder: Samuda Brothers, Poplar, London
- Laid down: 1864
- Launched: 8 August 1865
- Completed: December 1866
- Fate: Destroyed after it ran aground during the Battle of Punta Gruesa, 21 May 1879

General characteristics (as built)
- Type: Broadside ironclad
- Displacement: 3,500 long tons (3,600 t)
- Length: 215 ft (65.5 m) (p/p)
- Beam: 44 ft 9 in (13.6 m)
- Draught: 21 ft 6 in (6.6 m)
- Installed power: 2,200 ihp (1,600 kW)
- Propulsion: 1 shaft, 1 Trunk steam engine
- Sail plan: Barque-rigged
- Speed: 12 knots (22 km/h; 14 mph)
- Complement: 250
- Armament: Armament in 1866: 2 Armstrong × 7-inch (178 mm) rifled, muzzle-loading guns of 150 pounds on the main deck; 12 Armstrong × 6-inch (152 mm) rifled of 70 pounds, muzzle-loading guns on the gun deck; 4 × 32-pounder rifled, muzzle-loading guns; 4 × 9-pounder guns for its boats; Armament in 1879: 1 Vavassuer × 250-pounder on the main deck; 1 Parrot × 150-pounder on the main deck; 2 Armstrong 7-inch (178 mm) rifled, muzzle-loading guns of 150 pounds in the bow; 12 Armstrong × 6-inch (152 mm) rifled of 70 pounds, muzzle-loading guns on the gun deck; 2 × 9-pounder guns for its boats; 2 × 0.44 cal Gatling gun
- Armor: Belt: 4.5 in (114 mm); Battery: 4.5 in (114 mm)

BAP Independencia was a broadside ironclad built in England for the Peruvian Navy during the mid-1860s. During the War of the Pacific of 1879–83, Independencia ran aground while pursuing the Chilean schooner Covadonga during the Battle of Punta Gruesa on 21 May 1879. The survivors were rescued by Huáscar and the wreck destroyed to prevent its capture.

== Context ==
In the 1860s, Spain tried to reassert its influence over parts of South America. This would eventually lead to the Chincha Islands War, in which Peru declared war on Spain January 14, 1866. Before that, the Spanish fleet had seized the Peruvian Chincha Islands on April 14, 1864. The Spanish threat led to the orders for Independencia, Huáscar, and other vessels.

== Description ==
Independencia was 215 feet (65.5 m) long between perpendiculars, had a beam of 44 feet 9 inches (13.6 m) and a draft of 22 feet 6 inches (6.9 m). The ship displaced 3,500 long tons (3,600 t). She had one trunk steam engine that drove her single propeller. The engine produced 2,200 indicated horsepower (1,600 kW) which gave the ship a speed of 12 knots (22 km/h; 14 mph). For long-distance travel, Independencia was fitted with three masts and barque rigged. She had a crew of 250 officers and crewmen.

The ship was armed with four Armstrong 7-inch (178 mm), twelve 6-inch (152 mm) and four 30-pounder rifled, muzzle-loading guns. The 7-inch guns were on pivot mountings on the spar deck. She was a central-battery ironclad with the armament concentrated amidships. Independencia was equipped with a ram at her bow and her hull was divided into three watertight compartments. The ship had a complete waterline armor belt 4.5 inches (110 mm) thick. Her battery was protected by armor plates equally as thick.

== Construction ==
Independencia was built by Samuda Brothers at their shipyard in Poplar, London. She was laid down in 1864 and launched on 8 August 1865.

After Peru declared war on Spain on 14 January 1866, continuing construction of Independencia in the United Kingdom would mean a breach of neutrality. Meanwhile there were already Peruvian officers present at the shipyard. These then arranged for the tugboat Union to tow her to the Scheldt. On 28 January 1866, the couple passed Vlissingen, to continue to the harbor of Terneuzen. This meant that the ship anchored before the town, not in its port.

The Dutch government had to react to preserve neutrality. The screw frigate Adolf van Nassau was sent and passed Vlissingen on 2 February. It was to observe Independencia and to prevent her from taking on supplies that it should not. The Dutch also ordered the ironclad De Ruyter to move to Terneuzen and ordered the coastal batteries to be armed. However, the Dutch authorities could do little against Independencia. It was said that they ordered Independencia to leave, but that commandant Garcia flatly refused. After taking on coal, Independencia anchored before Vlissingen on 17 February and set sail on the 18th.

Moving Independencia to the Netherlands to finish was part of a bigger plan. On 17 January, the smaller ironclad Huáscar had left Liverpool. On 23 January, this vessel arrived in Brest. The French government reacted by sending the ironclad Flandre from Cherbourg. Like Independencia, Huáscar was not ready, its crew was not complete. The British three-mast ship Thames then came to supply ammunition, but her captain was arrested. Independencia arrived in Brest on 22 February. On 27 February both ships left Brest for open sea, escorted by Flandre. It was said that the supplies from Thames were transloaded there.

== Service ==
Independencia had her boilers replaced in 1878. In February 1879, her armament was reinforced by a 9-inch (229 mm) rifled, muzzle-loading pivot gun in the bow and a 150-pounder Parrott gun in the stern, also on a pivoting mount.

On 21 May 1879, she was in pursuit of Covadonga after the Battle of Iquique and attempted to ram the Chilean ship as Independencia had only hit her opponent once thus far. The smaller Covadonga was hugging the coastline and one of her sharpshooters shot Independencia's helmsman just as the ship began to turn. Without anyone at the wheel, Independencia ran aground. Covadonga turned around and came up aft of Independencia's stern and raked her, forcing her surrender, until Huáscar drove off the Chilean ship. Independencia's casualties were four dead and eleven wounded; the ship was a total loss and only two 7-inch guns could be salvaged. Huáscar loaded Independencia's crew aboard and blew up the wreck and set it on fire to prevent her capture.
