= Arturo Prat =

Chilean Navy officer and lawyer

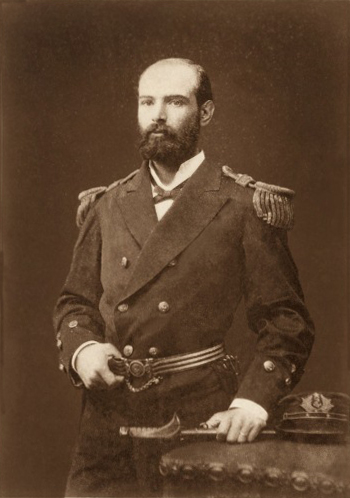
- Born: April 3, 1848; Ninhue, Chile
- Died: May 21, 1879 (aged 31); Off Iquique, Peru (present-day Chile)
- Spouse: Carmela Carvajal
- Children: Carmela de la Concepción, Blanca Estela and Arturo Héctor
- Military career
- Allegiance: Chile
- Branch: Chilean Navy
- Service years: 1861–1879
- Rank: Frigate captain
- Commands: Corvette Esmeralda; Schooner Covadonga
- Conflicts: Chincha Islands War; Battle of Papudo; Battle of Abtao; War of the Pacific; Blockade of Iquique; Battle of Iquique †
- Other work: Lawyer, teacher and secret agent

Signature
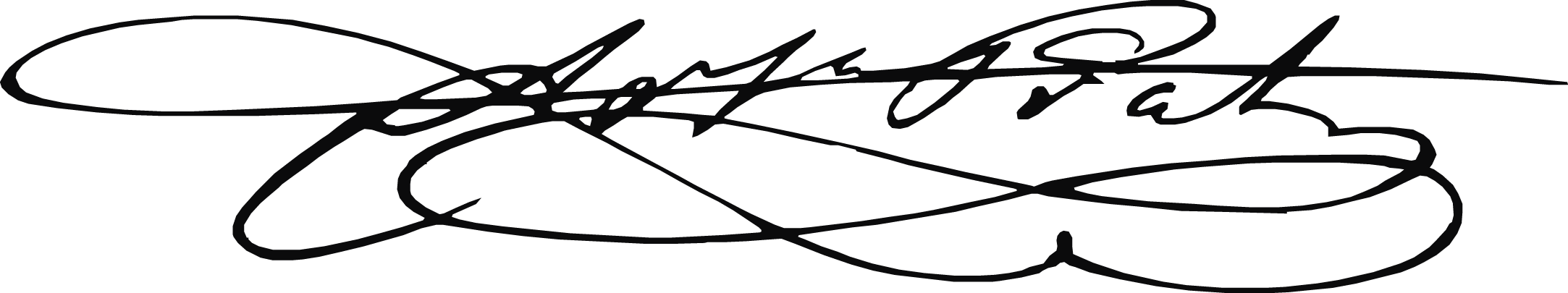

Agustín Arturo Prat Chacón (Latin American Spanish: [aɾˈtuɾo pɾat tʃaˈkon]; April 3, 1848 – May 21, 1879) was a Chilean Navy officer and lawyer. He was killed in the Battle of Iquique, during the War of the Pacific. During his career, Prat had taken part in several naval engagements, including battles at Papudo (1865), and at the Abtao (1866). Following his death, his name became a rallying cry for Chilean forces, and Arturo Prat has since been considered a national hero.

Prat's name is commemorated on numerous plazas (squares), streets, buildings and other structures in Chile. His name has been commemorated by four of Chile's major warships, including a Brooklyn-class cruiser in the 1950s, a British County-class destroyer from 1983 to 2006, and most recently a Dutch Jacob van Heemskerck-class frigate transferred to Chile as Capitan Prat in 2006. One of Chile's Antarctic research facilities, Arturo Prat Station, and the Chilean Naval Academy, Escuela Naval Arturo Prat are named after him. His portrait appears on the 10,000 Chilean peso bank note. Also, in 1984 Arturo Prat University was founded, with its main campus in Iquique where his heroic deed took place.

== Early life ==
Arturo Prat, the oldest of five brothers, (Ricardo, Rodolfo, Atala Rosa and Escilda Aurelia) son of Agustín Prat del Barril and Rosario Chacón Barrios, was born at the San Agustín de Puñual Hacienda in south-central Chile on April 3, 1848. The name Prat is of Catalan origin (not to be confused with the English 'Pratt'). He entered the Naval Academy on August 28, 1858, at the age of 10 years thanks to one of the scholarships created by President Manuel Montt, another son of Catalan immigrants. There were two scholarships per province: one for Arauco went to Prat, and the other went to Luis Uribe. Both had the same benefactor, Don Jacinto Chacón (uncle of Arturo and stepfather of Uribe), resulting in the two youths considering each other as brothers.

At the time, the academy was directed by the Frenchman Juan Julio Feillet and was backed by another Frenchman, Anatolio Desmadryl. Young Arturo and his friend Luis were part of the so-called "class of the heroes" including Carlos Condell, Juan José Latorre, and Jorge Montt Álvarez.

In 1859, his second year as a cadet, he commenced a nautical apprenticeship – a requirement for second-year students. His first voyage of training was completed in the steamer Independencia, with sail and rigging maneuvers, followed later by practice in seamanship and artillery.

In January 1860, Prat boarded, for the first time, Esmeralda. His nautical apprenticeship continued: embarkation and disembarkation, combat simulation, etc. In July 1861, he left the Naval Academy as "primera antigüedad" (the most distinguished in the course). He obtained the grade of "midshipman without examination".

During this period, Prat distinguished himself in an incident involving Infernal, a French ship that was carrying explosive materials. On October 1, 1861, it caught on fire while in the Bay of Valparaíso. Esmeralda, which was nearby, sent boats to save the wreck, one of which was steered by Prat, who would struggle for two hours against the fire.

=== War with Spain ===
On July 21, 1864, Arturo Prat passed the theoretical and practical test needed to be promoted from "midshipman without exam" to "examined midshipman". That year saw the incidents that resulted in the war against Spain, inflamed by the Chilean attitude towards the occupation of the Peruvian Chincha Islands by a Spanish squadron. The resulting war would prove to be a baptism of fire for Prat and his classmates.

Commanding Esmeralda at the time was Juan Williams Rebolledo, who planned the recovery of the Chilean steamer Matías Cousiño and the capture of the Spanish schooner Covadonga. The naval battle of Papudo occurred on December 26 and rapidly went the way of the Chilean force which was superior in firepower and was able to defeat and capture the ship. The capture of Covadonga resulted in the promotion by one grade of all sailors participating in the battle, converting Prat into an ensign (equivalent to a second lieutenant in the army).

Wishing to offset their losses at Papudo, the Spanish fleet sought another confrontation with the allied navies (Peru and Ecuador added to Chile's side), leading to the inconclusive battle of Abtao at Chiloé on February 7, 1866. Artillery combat occurred only between Covadonga and the Spanish screw frigates Villa de Madrid and Reina Blanca, as the other allied ships were unused due to a lack of coal and the rocky estuary. Prat then served on Covadonga, the ship which resisted the Spanish bombardment. There were no losses on the allied side, while the Spanish suffered two deaths.

=== Young officer ===
After the war, Prat completed a large number of sea voyages, both inside and outside his country, including voyages to the Juan Fernández Islands, Easter Island (on the corvette Esmeralda under Policarpo Toro's command), Magallanes and Peru. During the latter trip in 1868, he was responsible for transporting aid to those affected by that year's earthquake, and he later brought back the remains of Bernardo O'Higgins, at the orders of Manuel Blanco Encalada.

Prat was promoted to a lieutenant on September 9. He returned to Naval School, as an instructor. From 1871, he was the Second Commander of Esmeralda, leading to his appointment to several positions in the school (teacher, subdirector, internal director), and was assigned to teach courses such as Naval Order, Law, Naval Tactics and Cosmography. Additionally, he was responsible for docking the corvette for four years (1871–1874) in the port of Mejillones. He received the title of Graduated Corvette Captain (equivalent to lieutenant commander) in 1873 and Capitán de Corbeta Efectivo in 1874. He was a dedicated teacher who fought against the lack of resources available to provide quality education. He translated textbooks from French to Spanish.

Around that time, Prat faced an unusual situation. On May 24, 1875, Esmeralda was in the port of Valparaíso while Prat was on sick leave. The commander of the ship, Luis Alfredo Lynch, was also on leave, so Lieutenant Constantino Bannen was left in charge. A storm began in the bay and Valdivia broke its cables and went right towards Esmeralda, which then impacted with Maipo. It appeared that the destruction of Esmeralda would be unavoidable. When Prat and Lynch returned, they managed to be taken back to the ship by boat, but the violent waves kept them from embarking. Lynch and Prat threw themselves into the water and swam to the ship to climb a rope. Prat worked feverishly with a rope tied from his waist to the mast to accomplish rescue maneuvers which stopped the vessel with its bow against the beach, and secure it there with rigging. Luis Alfredo Lynch later remembered Prat's "unflappable calm in the face of danger".

The repair of Esmeralda was long and hard and cost 100,000 pesos. Lynch had to face charges of dereliction of duty, however he was saved by a tie in the voting. Throughout the trial, Arturo Prat was always faithful to his superior, helping him however he could.

After the tests of May 1876 and only three years before the War of the Pacific, the Chilean government closed the Naval School, saying that Chile no longer needed naval officers.

Prat, who left Condell in charge of Esmeralda, disembarked and, because of his studies in law, was named helper of the Maritime Government of Valparaíso. It was December 1876, he was already a graduated commander, but he only returned to the ship after the war started.

== Lawyer ==
=== Studies ===
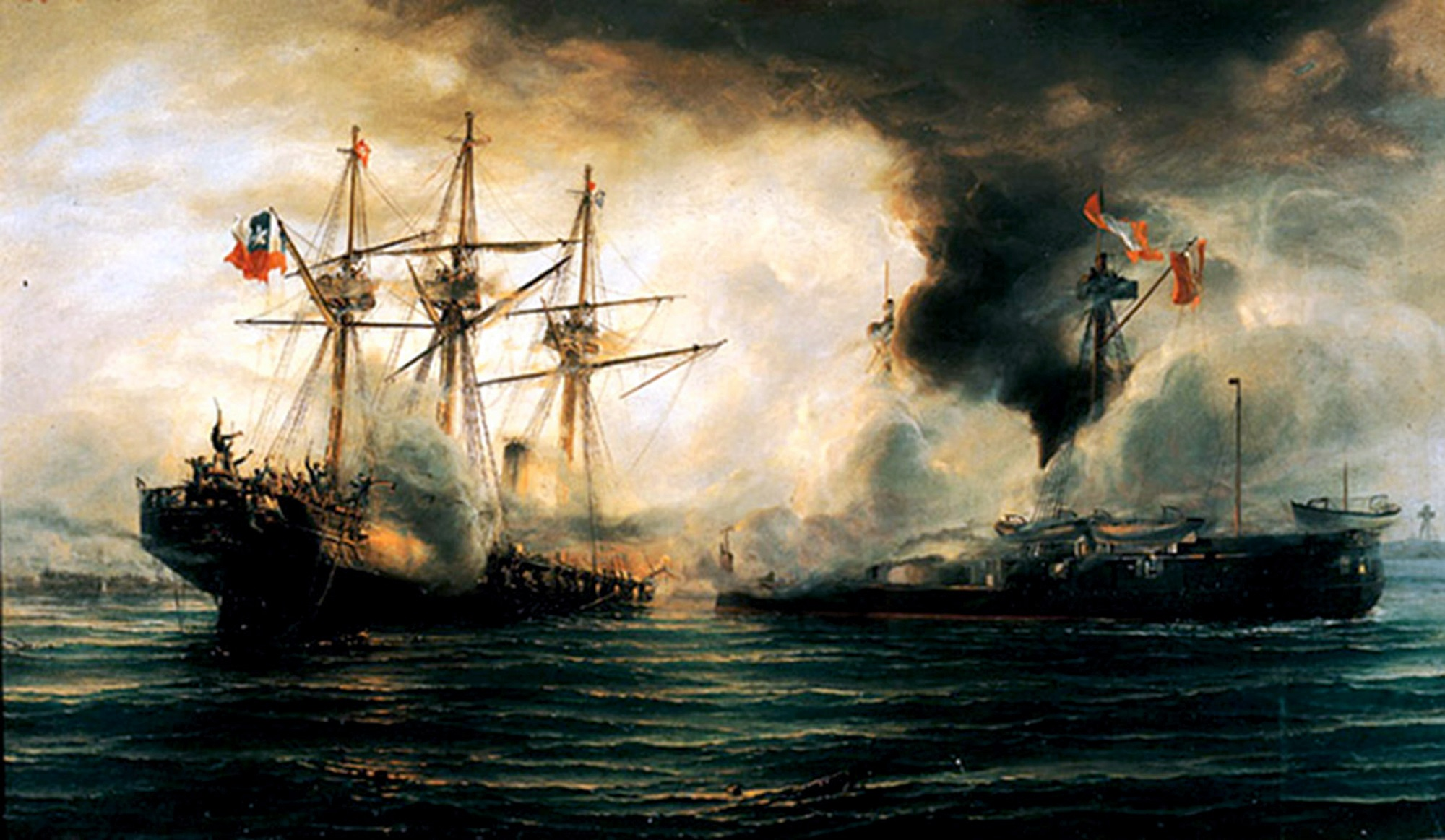
Naval Battle of Iquique

In 1870, Prat began the path of becoming a lawyer. Prat had always had an interest in law and therefore decided to pursue his law degree. He entered as a secondary student in humanities at the Liceo de Valparaíso and the National Institute (Instituto Nacional). In 1871, he received his diploma in Philosophy and Humanities — a prerequisite for studying law. One of his examiners was the renowned Chilean historian Diego Barros Arana.

In the following year, he began his studies in Property Law in the Faculty of Law of the University of Chile. He studied on board the "Esmeralda", which was located in Mejillones. Upon returning from his mission, he requested to take his examinations in Valparaíso where he passed the required subjects.

In 1875, he began practicing law at a law firm in the port town as a prerequisite to receiving his license.

In July of the following year, Prat passed his remaining courses and was then ready to complete his licensing. In order to graduate, he was required to pass an examination on a randomly chosen area of law. He was assigned Roman Law, which he managed to pass between 24 and 26 July 1876, while his thesis "Observaciones sobre la ley electoral vigente" (Observations on the current electoral law) was approved. There remained one final step before receiving his license — a final exam before the judges of the Supreme Court.

On 31 July 1876, at 11 a.m., the lieutenant commander passed through the corridors of Supreme Court of Justice in full dress uniform wearing his sword at his belt; he had come to take his examination before the highest judges, the final requirement to practise law. However, much to his surprise, Prat was told that the judges had decided not to hear examinations that day. Prat protested that he had an appointment for that day, that he had very little free time as a naval officer, and requested a meeting with Manuel Montt Torres, the Supreme Court president. Having convinced Montt to receive him, and to much applause from the court, Prat went on to become a lawyer at the age of 28.

Prior to his final exam, Prat had already conducted legal work while defending the engineer Ricardo Owen, accused of disobedience, and also his friend and classmate Luis Uribe, accused of disobedience and contempt to his superiors. He succeeded the first time, but he was not so successful with the defence of his friend, who was condemned to six months of jail by six votes. The amnesty of the President saved Uribe and his naval career from that fate.

=== Jurist ===
Prat practised his recently adopted profession for a very short time. He primarily devoted himself to resolving the legal problems of the Chacón and Carvajal families, as well as naval-related problems.

He aspired to be a Navy auditor, but he was only sworn as "assistant" (mainly because of his lack of experience), assigned the legal aspects of the Navy General Command. Prat performed a complete remodeling of the army's legal system, starting with the Navigation Law. He presented 152 modifications to it, many of which were approved. He was also in charge of the regularization of the promotion system, proposing changes to avoid social relations, politics and other factors, making it a merit and seniority based system. Prat died without this navy code having been published.

=== "Observaciones a la ley electoral vigente" ===
This was Arturo Prat's thesis book, which contained many clues about his political thoughts. It was written within the framework of the promulgation of the new electoral law during Federico Errázuriz Zañartu's government, in which the Greater Taxpayer Institution and Parliament Member Cumulative Vote were established.

Prat analyzes this law with the perspective that it would make possible further progress towards electoral freedom. He points out the contradictions and obscurity of the text, but he stresses that it is an "eminently liberal" law. Prat ends saying: ...deep-down a good law, it needs serious and important reforms with respect to regulations if it is to achieve the lofty objective it is destined to: to be the effective guarantee that the voting result is the happy expression of the national will."

The text reveals Prat's political ideas, clearly reflecting the common liberalism of the times, and demonstrates a great naivety (not even with all of its indications could the law prevent the intervention of the executive power.)

== Family life ==
=== Engagement and matrimony ===
Pedro Chacón used to throw parties in his portside house once or twice a week. Prat frequently attended, as did Concepción Chacón's sister-in-law, Carmela Carvajal. In those happy get-togethers the couple met and fell in love, a love that would last a lifetime.

Their attraction was obvious, but Prat was concerned when others mentioned it. In addition to his shyness, he was annoyed because he was afraid to formalize an engagement because he had no money to support the marriage.

When he learned that he would be promoted to Corvette Captain, he finally decided to ask for Carmela's hand, in 1873. The only love letter from Prat to his fiancée that has survived is dated shortly after:

My Carmela, my life, my treasure, I have to tell you, that I adore you every day more fervently, I cannot do it now because I am afraid I could fall ill. Receive the passionate heart of your Arturo.

On 5 May 1873 the wedding bells sounded over the San Agustín de Valparaíso church. A beautiful red carpet was laid, over which the radiant 22-year-old bride passed on her way to the altar. Her parents had died when she was a girl, and she had been raised by her siblings, through whom she had contact with the Chacón family. The Chacón adopted her as a member of the family. Tall, slender and beautiful, she met with a sturdy Arturo Prat, with large forehead due to his baldness, thick beard and steady step. The minister, José Francisco Salas, blessed them at 10:30 am. They were married. Their relationship as spouses was based on a love that did not fade during the six years they lived together. Prat treated his wife as an equal, as a partner (something really rare in that society), putting her in charge of the family budget; and he, on the other hand, helped with some house chores: "At every moment I seem to find you exhausted from rocking our daughter, without me being next to you and sharing, albeit a bit, your labors...".

=== First happiness and first tragedy ===
The newlyweds spent their honeymoon in Quillota and in the Cauquenes's hot springs. After that, Prat returned to Valparaíso to resume his navy duties. He did not see his wife again until October. By that time Carmela was already pregnant with their first daughter. Prat wrote of his daughter's birth:

The fifth of march Carmela de la Concepción was born at 9:35 a.m., under the circumstances that I had to go to Santiago just the day before... The fifth of April she was baptised in the Church of the Holy Spirit, the godparents being Conchita with José Jesús...

It seems to me that she was to be very vivacious, smiling, playful... Last night I dreamt about her and she seemed to know me and with her little face a bit sad, she extended her little arms to hug me...

But like Prat's older brothers who died very young, the girl inherited a very frail and sickly build. Arturo writes to Carmela: "Keep using homeopathy for my little daughter and inform me after she is healthy." He has, undoubtedly, the hope that the method that (he supposed) cured his weak condition, would work the same wonders in little Carmela. But it didn't work, the child's life was extinguishing more and more every day, to the despair of the helpless parents, who put all their strengths in their prayers.

Poor little angel! I cannot see her any more, at least I want her to be healthy.

Carmelita's problem was a hernia caused by the badly removed umbilical cord, in addition to several other illnesses (diarrhea, fever, etc.)

Adding to Prat's despair, at the end of the annual season, he had to be transferred to the center of the country, on the Abtao, a steamer that should have arrived but had not. On Sunday 13 December the boat finally arrived, and he wrote to his wife: "Later then I will be seeing you, as I will see my little child who I hope is completely healthy..." But the girl had died one week before on 5 December. At dusk, a devastating letter arrived from his wife: "My beloved Arturo, our dear little angel is still not well; I feel my heart fainting from pain and you are not here to hold me... If it were possible for you to come, that would be my only comfort. Don't despair my wellbeing, think of your unhappy Carmela." Adding to Prat's desperation, the steamboat would not leave until the 18th.

All his hopes were destroyed in that trip, days later, when he was given a condolence letter in an intermediate port, signed by Juan José Latorre. Arturo wrote at the foot of Carmela's previous letter: "The 5 December, at past 1 hour and 3 minutes after midnight, my daughter Carmela de la Concepción died. This is the letter destined to announce it to me. The sadness it reveals should have made me see, but hope is so sweet."

== War of the Pacific ==
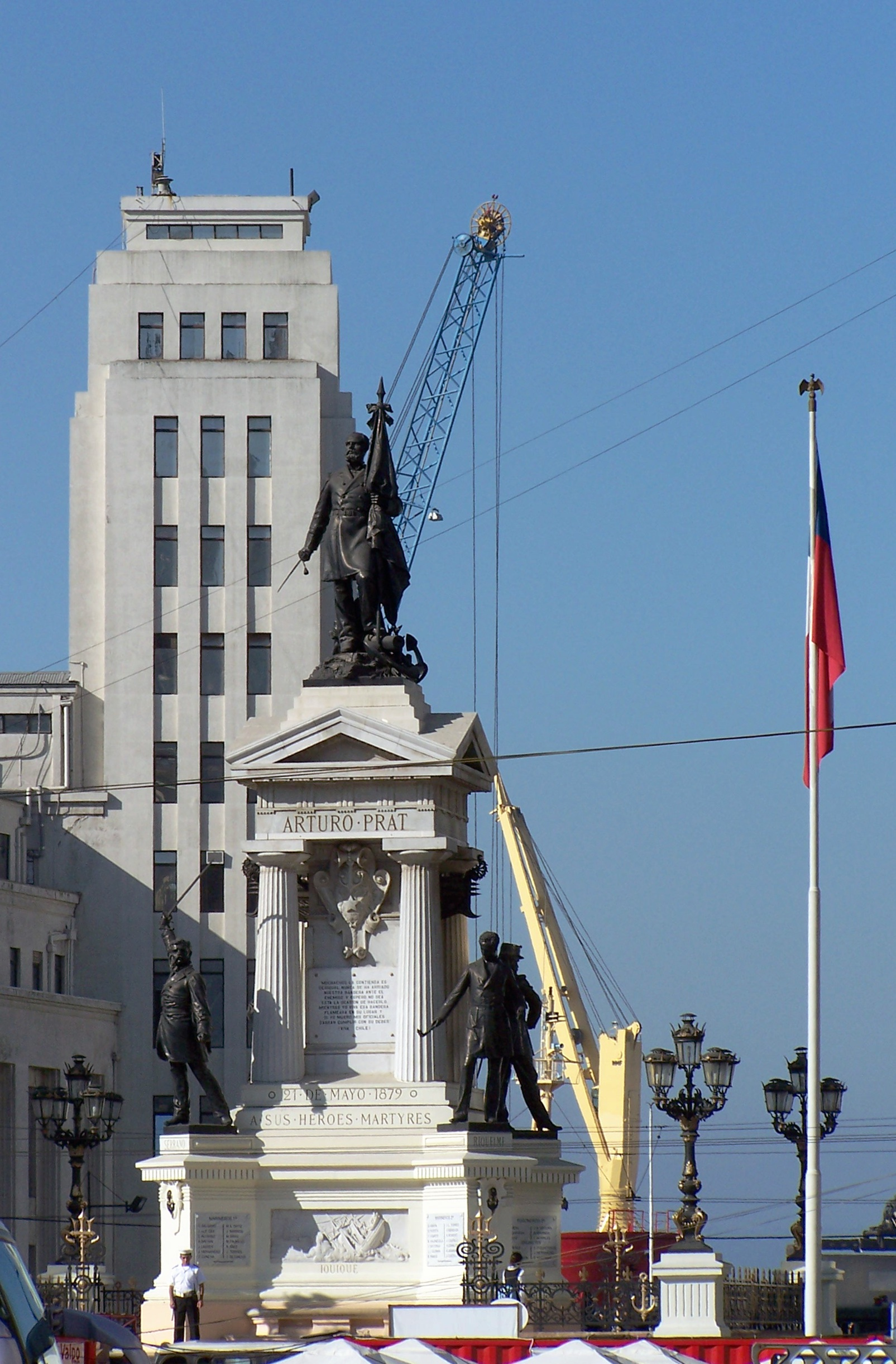
Heroes of Iquique monument and crypt in Valparaíso, Chile. At the top is the statue of Prat, on the second level statues of Serrano, Riquelme, Aldea and a generic seaman

When the war broke out, Prat was assigned to assistant of the Navy General Command, a position he tried to reject.

When Don Rafael Sotomayor Baeza was required to go to Antofagasta with instructions from the Government, he requested an assistant, and Prat was assigned to the job. Being both of them aboard the armored Blanco Encalada, he was assigned to notify Iquique's authorities that they have been blocked by the Chilean army, which he did without letting the hostile position of the people daunt him.

He was assigned Covadonga's command. On 3 May the corvette Abtao, under lieutenant commander Carlos Condell de la Haza's command, and Covadonga, under Prat's command, set sail towards Iquique arriving on 10 May.

To achieve the plan that Admiral Juan Williams Rebolledo had conceived, consisting of attacking the Peruvian squadron in Callao's port, he assigned as Abtao's commander Manuel Thompson, who commanded the corvette Esmeralda until then. Arturo Prat replaced him, and Carlos Condell de la Haza was designated Covadonga's commander.

On 16 May, the squadron set sail to Callao, with the intention of surprising the Peruvian warships, but the same day Peruvian monitor Huáscar and armored frigate Independencia set sail from that port, towards Arica, to carry reinforcements, armaments, ammunition and provisions, so both squadrons missed each other on their trips.

=== Battle of Iquique and death ===
It was 21 May 1879, 6:30 in the morning, when the fog cleared, Covadonga's lookout shouted: "Smoke to the north!". But, owing to thick marine fog, they were not able to identify the newly arrived ships, but after a few moments they thought it was the Peruvian squadron coming back.

At 6:45 a.m., a sailor by Condell's side asked for the telescope, and in a moment of clarity he observed the warships' rigging and said to Condell: "It's the Huáscar and the Independencia". "What basis do you have to assert that?" asked Condell, and the sailor answered "From the shape of the platform on top of the foremast".

Immediately Condell ordered a shot to be fired in the air to warn Esmeralda, still anchored in the port. The ships were indeed Independencia and Huáscar.

In that same moment, the Peruvian admiral Miguel Grau addressed his crew: "Crewmembers and Sailors of the Huáscar, Iquique is at sight, there are our afflicted fellow countrymen from Tarapacá, and also the enemy, still unpunished. It's time to punish them! I hope you will know how. Remember how our forces distinguished in Junin, the 2nd of May, Abtao, Ayacucho and other battlefields, to win us our glorious and dignified independence, and our consecrated and brilliant laurels of freedom. No matter the outcome, Peru will not fall. For our fatherland, Long Live Peru!"

Carlos Condell de la Haza warned Prat, and he, seeing the difference between their forces and the enemy's, pronounced his famous impassioned speech in front of his brothers in arms:

Lads, the battle will be unfair, but, cheer and have courage. Never has our flag been hauled down before the enemy and I hope this will not be the occasion for it to happen. From my part, I assure you that as long as I live, this flag will remain flying in its place, and if I should die, my officers will know how to fulfill their duties. Long Live Chile!

Esmeralda was an old wooden corvette weighing 850 tons and 200 horsepower, with eight 40-pound cannons, four 30-pounders and two of 6 pounds. When the action began, Prat ordered Condell to follow his course and Covadonga met with Esmeralda and La Mar in the middle of the bay. With the bugler sounding Action Stations, the crew took their places.

At 8:15, the first volley hit between the ships, and Prat ordered Esmeralda to start moving, followed by Covadonga. At 8:25 a second volley fell and a shot from Huáscar hit fully on the starboard (right) side, passed through Esmeralda's side, killing the surgeon Videla, beheading his assistant, and mortally wounding another sailor.

The transporter Lamar hoisted the US flag and fled to the south, and Condell changed his course and went behind that ship. Grau ordered Independencia to block Covadonga and Lamar's way. Prat observed Condell's action and asked himself: "What is Condell doing?" Condell ignored Prat's order and followed Lamar, but the warship did get away from Covadonga, and Independencia under control of Juan Guillermo Moore followed him. On the other hand, the monitor Huáscar weighed 1,130 tons and had armour plating 4 1/2 inches thick, with two 300-pound cannon in a revolving turret and 11 knots maximum speed.

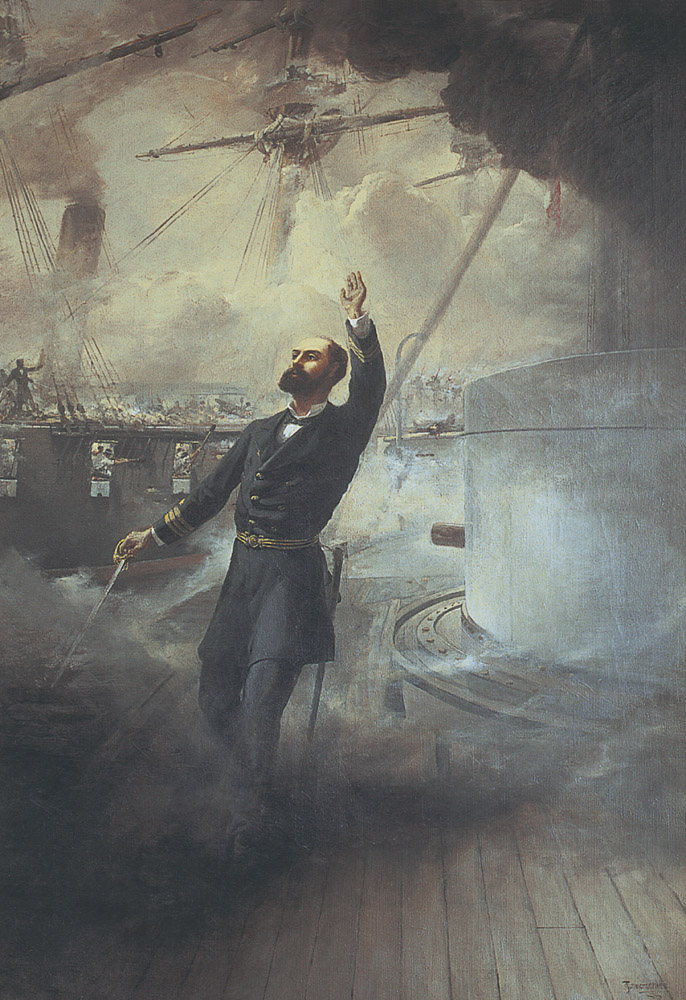
Death of Arturo Prat. Painting by Thomas Somerscales

Grau directed Independencia to chase Covadonga, while he finished Esmeralda. Prat quickly positioned the ship in front of the coast, 200 meters from it, forcing Huáscar to shoot with a parabolic trajectory to avoid hitting the Peruvian village, whose people gathered in crowds to watch the battle.

General Buendía, commander of the Peruvian garrison of Iquique, had artillery cannons placed on the beach and sent an emissary in a fast rowing boat with a warning to Huáscar that Esmeralda was loaded with torpedoes. Grau stopped 600 m (660 yd) from her and began shooting with the 300-pound cannons, not hitting her for an hour and a half, owing to the Peruvian sailors' inexperience in the handling of the monitor's Coles turret. The Chilean crew answered with their 30-pound cannons and gunfire, shots that rebounded uselessly from Huáscar's plated armour.

At the coast, the Peruvian Army garrison in the town began to bombard the Chilean ship. A grenade reached her, killing three men. Prat ordered the warship to move, slowly maneuvering at scarcely 4 knots, for her engine was defective and one of her boilers had burst. He stopped 1,000 m from the city and 250 m from land, where they would stand until their sinking. This move allowed Grau to see the absence of the torpedoes that supposedly filled Esmeralda. One of Huáscar's shots hit directly on board, beheading the ordering bugler and mutilating the gun crews. The position of Esmeralda was desperate.

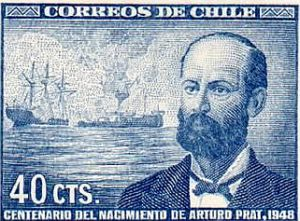
Arturo Prat on a Chilean stamp of 1948

At 11:30am, Admiral Grau, seeing the useless slaughter and wanting to end the combat, which had been nearly four hours long, ordered his ship to ram into Esmeralda. The monitor backed to get enough impulse and charged bow-first into starboard side of the ship. When Prat saw the enemy warship colliding into his, near the stern, he raised his sword and cried his final order: "Let's board, boys!", but due to the roar of the battle, only the Marine Artilleryman and Prat's personal escort in battle, Petty Officer Juan de Dios Aldea and Seaman Arsenio Canave heard it, and both of them and Prat jumped aboard Huáscar. Arsenio unfortunately slipped and fell down because of the impact, so only the two officers got to the monitor. Aldea received a burst from the artillery tower and fell mortally injured. Only Prat continued advancing, amazing the Peruvian crew with his tremendous courage. Grau gave the order to capture him alive.

Prat got to the enemy's deck and advanced towards the command tower, but he was hit by a bullet, bringing him down to his knees. Another shot from a sharpshooter perched on the artillery tower struck him dead.

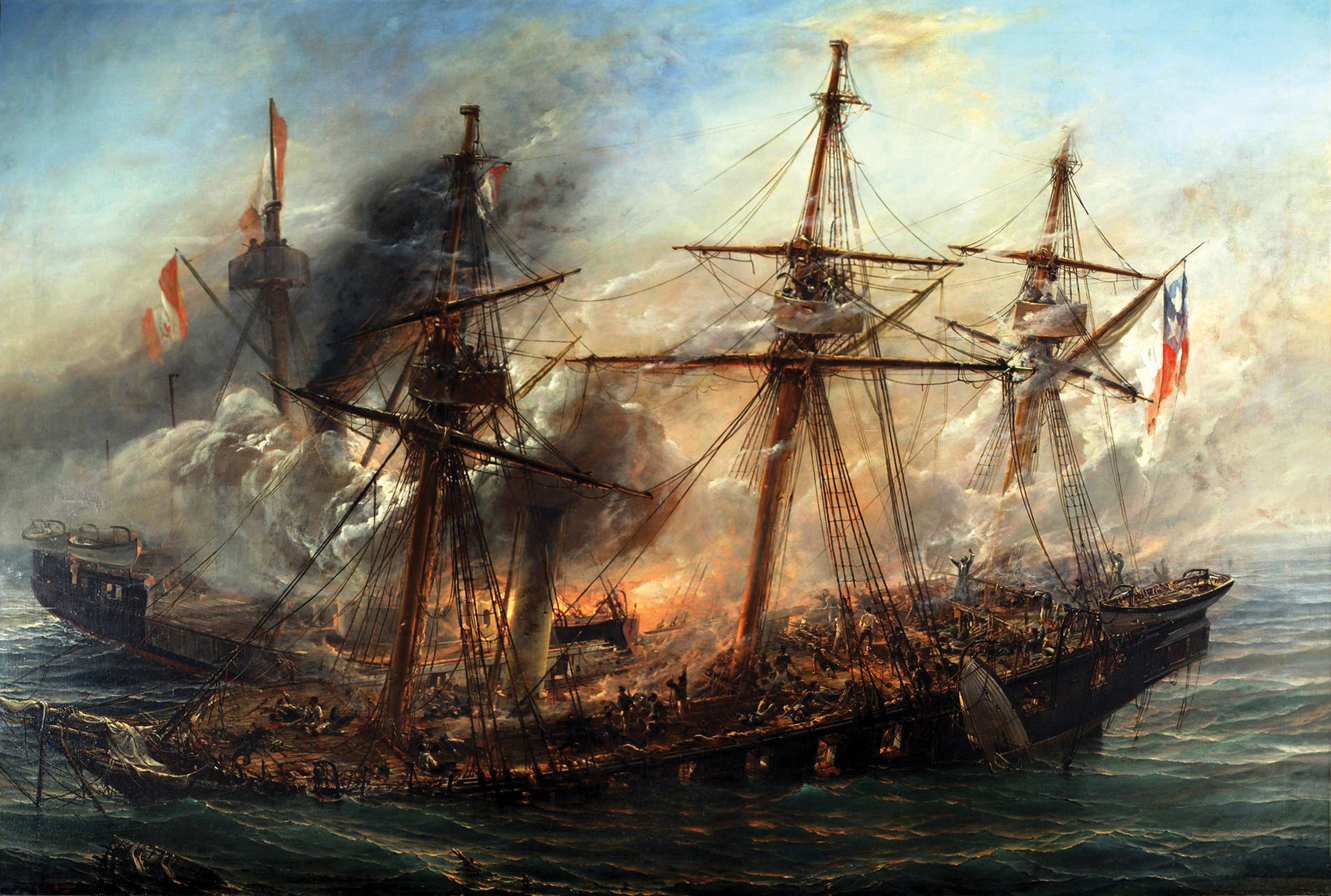
Sinking of Esmeralda

The crew of Esmeralda saw with horror their captain's sacrifice, and when Huáscar tried another charge, now against Esmeralda's bow, Sublieutenant Ignacio Serrano boarded Huáscar with ten more men, armed with machetes and rifles but they were massacred by shots from the mounted Gatling guns and the monitor's crew. Serrano was then the only survivor, having received several wounds in the groin. Grau quickly had him picked up and carried to the infirmary in a state of shock, where they left him next to the dying petty officer Aldea.

A third ram, this time into the middle of Esmeralda, was fatal and sentenced the ship to death. Nobody else could jump to the other ship, as Esmeralda was already sinking. The last cannon shot was fired by Midshipman Ernesto Riquelme, while the main deck was going underwater. Grau and the Huáscar crew by then also heard shouts of "Long Live Chile! Glory and Victory!" from the ship's sailors. It was 12:10 pm at midday. Grau expressed grief for Prat's death and paid his respects at his own cabin.

After the battle, Grau gave orders that Prat's body and those of his men were to be taken ashore for burial in Iquique and that Prat's personal possessions (diary, uniform and sword among others) were to be returned to his widow. Carmela Carvajal received the items, together with an attached letter from the Peruvian admiral, affirming his rival's personal qualities, his gentility and his high moral values. The bodies of Prat and his crew were initially laid to rest in Iquique but in 1888 their remains were transferred to a crypt under the imposing new Heroes of Iquique monument in Valparaiso's Sotomayor Square.

In the confrontation of Iquique, Chile lost that day an old wooden ship, but Prat's death allowed the mobilization of the Chilean population to support the war, and that would be one of the factors of the Chilean victory in the War of the Pacific, the most important being the superiority of the Chilean fleet in the Pacific.

== See also ==
- Chilean ship Capitán Prat
- Juan de Dios Aldea

== Trivia ==
- "Arturo Prat" is the most ubiquitous street name across Chile. There are 144 communes in Chile which have a street bearing his name, outnumbering "Esmeralda" (130), "Manuel Rodríguez" (128), "Gabriela Mistral" (127).
