= Huáscar (ironclad) =

19th-century small armoured turret ship

Coordinates: 36°42′19.7″S 73°6′41.1″W

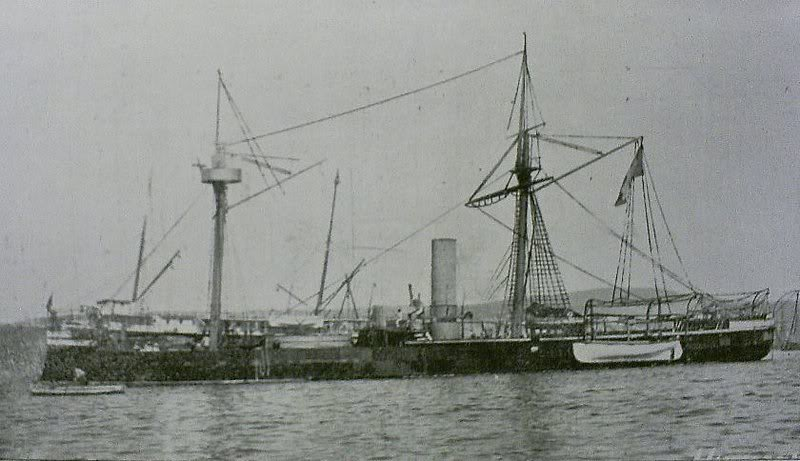
- Huáscar in 1903

History

Peru
- Name: Huáscar
- Ordered: 4 August 1864
- Builder: Laird Brothers, Birkenhead, England
- Launched: 7 October 1865
- Commissioned: 8 November 1866
- Captured: Captured by Chile at the Battle of Angamos, 8 October 1879

Chile
- Acquired: 8 October 1879
- Decommissioned: 1897
- Reinstated: 1934
- Status: Museum ship

General characteristics
- Type: Ironclad turret ship
- Displacement: 1,870 long tons (1,900 t)
- Length: 66.9 m (219 ft 6 in)
- Beam: 10.9 m (35 ft 9 in)
- Draught: 5.7 m (18 ft 8 in)
- Installed power: 1,650 ihp (1,230 kW); 4 × boilers
- Propulsion: 1 × screw; 1 × Horizontal-return connecting rod-steam engine
- Sail plan: Brig-rigged
- Speed: 12 knots (22 km/h; 14 mph)
- Complement: 170
- Armament: 2 × 10-inch (254 mm), 300 lb (136 kg) Armstrong guns in a single Coles turret; 2 × 4.7-inch (120 mm), 40 lb (18 kg) Armstrong guns; 1 × 12-pounder guns; 1 × .44 cal Gatling gun; Armoured ram bow
- Armour: Belt: 2.5–4.5 in (64–114 mm); Gun turrets: 5.5–7.5 in (140–191 mm); Conning tower: 3 in (76 mm); Deck: 2 in (51 mm)

Huáscar is an ironclad turret ship owned by the Chilean Navy built in 1865 for the Peruvian government. It is named after the 16th-century Inca emperor, Huáscar. She was the flagship of the Peruvian Navy and participated in the Battle of Pacocha and the War of the Pacific of 1879–1883. At the Battle of Angamos, Huáscar, captained by renowned Peruvian naval officer Miguel Grau Seminario, was captured by the Chilean fleet and commissioned into the Chilean Navy.

Today Huáscar is the only surviving ship of her type. She has been restored and is a memorial ship anchored in Talcahuano, Chile. Huáscar is the second oldest armored warship afloat after Warrior, and the oldest monitor afloat.

== Technical details ==
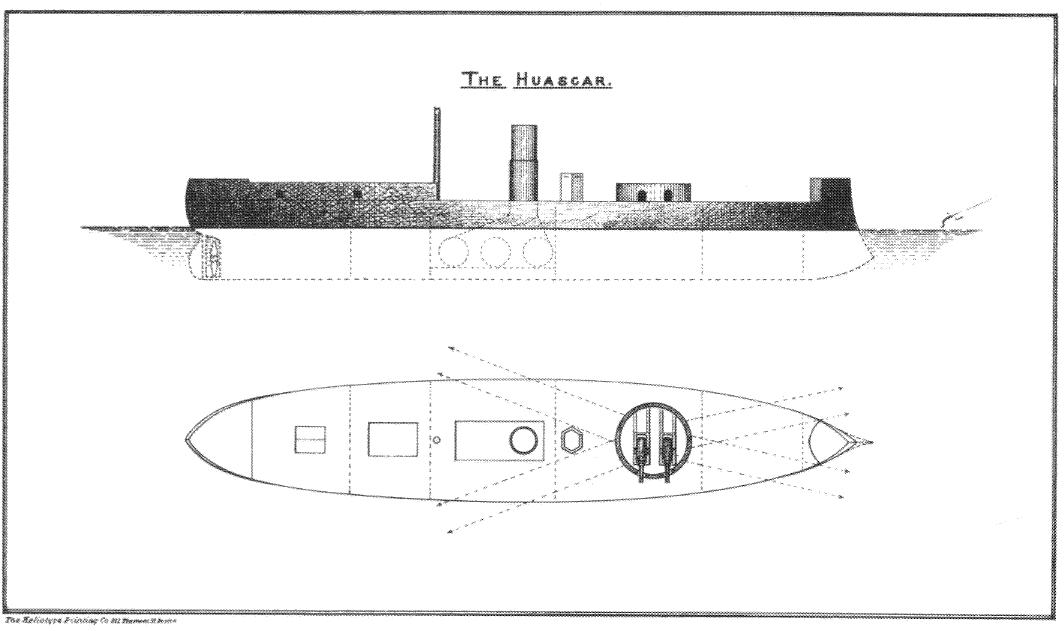
Starboard profile drawing of Huáscar

Captain Cowper Coles, wrote of Huáscar: "...as a sea-going vessel of 1,100 tons, 300-horse power, and a speed of 12 1/4 knots. Her foremast is fitted with tripods; she carries two 300-pounders in one turret." And "...the "Huascar" class of 1865 fitted with a hurricane deck; she was one of six different classes designed and built by Messrs. Laird Brothers, to whom the credit for their great success is due. She can fire right ahead from her 300-pounders, and aft within 15 degrees of the line of keel, but would have a stern chaser either on or under her poop."

The British magazine Engineering described it: "She is an armour-clad monitor built by Messrs. Laird Brothers, of Birkenhead, in 1866...... She is 190 ft. in length between perpendiculars, 35 ft. in extreme breadth, and 19 ft. 9 in. in depth of hold. Her builder's tonnage is 1101, and indicated horse power 1500. Her draught of water is 15 ft. 6 in., and her maximum speed is said to be 12 knots when her boilers are in good condition, and the bottom is clean. Her usual speed under good working conditions is probably not more than 10 1/2 to 11 knots. She is propelled by a single screw. The Huascar is a rigged two-masted vessel, the foremast being upon Captain Cole's tripod principle. Her freeboard, or height of deck above water, is about 5 ft. She carries two 300-pounder Armstrong guns in one turret, which is protected by 5 1/2-in. armour plating upon a teak backing of 14 in. The sides are protected by armour plating 4 1/2 in. thick amidships, tapering to 2 1/2 in. at the extremities, which is also worked upon a teak backing of 14 in. There is an armoured pilot tower of hexagonal form abaft the turret from which the ship is worked in action; and the openings in the deck are protected by 2-in. iron plates that are shipped in the openings for skylights or hatchways. The Huascar is an iron-built vessel, and at the time she was built was most perfect in all the appliances of defence, and in her internal arrangements."

== Career in Peruvian Navy ==
=== First years ===
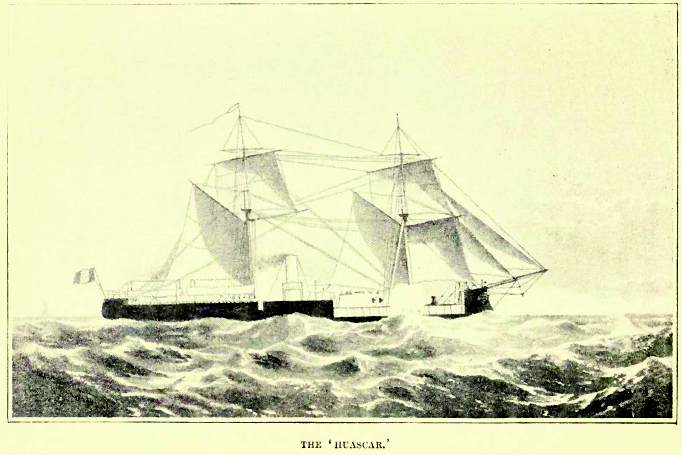
A drawing of Huascar with her brig-rigged sails

Huáscar was ordered by the Peruvian government from the British shipbuilder John Laird Sons & Company in 1864 for the war against Spain. Laird House had extensive experience of these advanced ships, designing and building the "Laird ram". She was built for a price slightly more than £81,000, and launched in Birkenhead on 7 October 1865.

Commanded by Peruvian-Chilean Captain José María Salcedo, a naval officer in service of the Peruvian government, who had supervised construction on behalf of the Peruvian Navy, she left for Peru on 20 January 1866 on a trip that saw some trouble: a month-long wait at Brest, a minor collision with the ironclad Independencia on 28 February, refusal of service by neutral countries, a month of repairs at Rio de Janeiro, insubordination by Independencia's commander and the capture and sinking of the Spanish brigantine Manuel. When she finally arrived in port at Ancud in allied Chile to join the rest of the combined fleet on 7 June, it was too late for her to participate in the conflict.

Under Captain Lizardo Montero, Huáscar prepared at Valparaíso to participate in a late 1866 expedition to fight the Spanish fleet in the Philippines. However Montero, with several other Peruvian officers, objected to plans for Rear Admiral John R. Tucker –formerly a commander of Confederate warships during the American Civil War – to command the fleet, and requested to be relieved. Captain Salcedo took back command of Huáscar, but the expedition was eventually cancelled.

In February 1868, Peruvian naval officer Miguel Grau took command of Huáscar and would remain in command until 1876, becoming her longest-serving commander. His long years aboard the ironclad would prove very valuable later and he would also become Peru's most renowned naval officer.

=== Peruvian Civil War ===
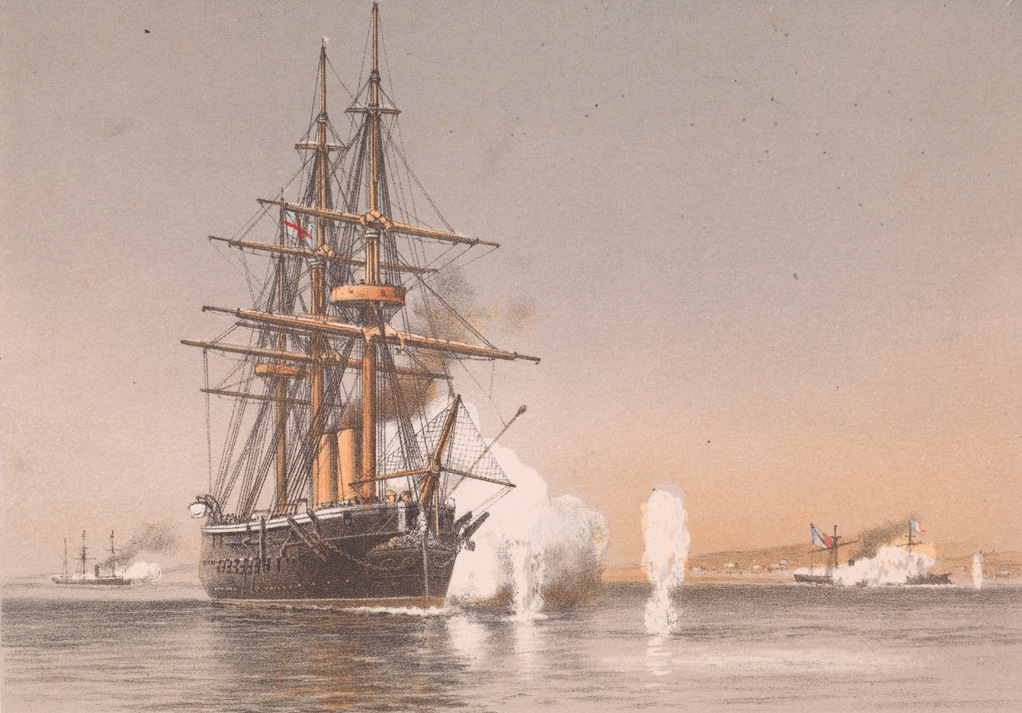
Huáscar (right) at the Battle of Pacocha

Huáscar participated in Nicolás de Piérola's 1877 attempt to overthrow the Peruvian government. On the 6 May, two of de Piérola's supporters, Colonel Lorranaga and Major Echenique, boarded the Huáscar at the port of Callao while the captain and executive officer were ashore. Some of the ship's officers on board were part of the plot and persuaded the crew to join their cause. Now in rebel hands, the Huáscar put to sea with Luis Germán Astete in command. Other Peruvian naval ships present in the port, such as the Atahualpa were in a state of disrepair and unable to pursue. The ship was used to harass, sabotage and disrupt government forces and shipping lanes. During these actions foreign shipping was also affected, leading to British intervention.

On 29 May 1877, she fought the inconclusive Battle of Pacocha against two British warships, the frigate HMS Shah and corvette HMS Amethyst, commanded by Admiral Algernon de Horsey. This battle saw the first use in combat of the newly invented self-propelled torpedo which, at the time, had just entered limited service with the Royal Navy; Huáscar successfully outran a torpedo fired by Shah. Huáscar surrendered to the government after almost one month in rebel hands.

=== War of the Pacific ===
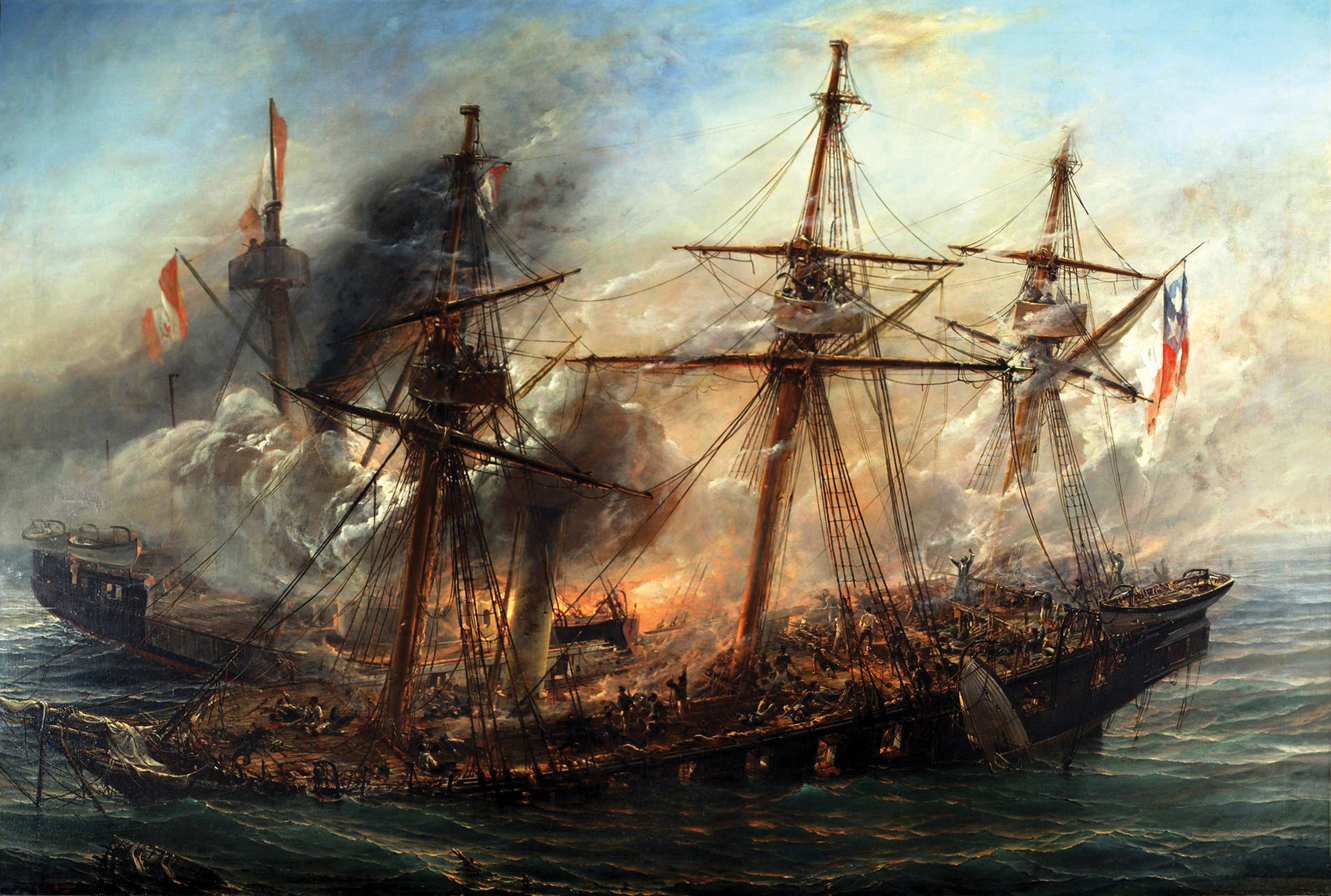
The Battle of Iquique

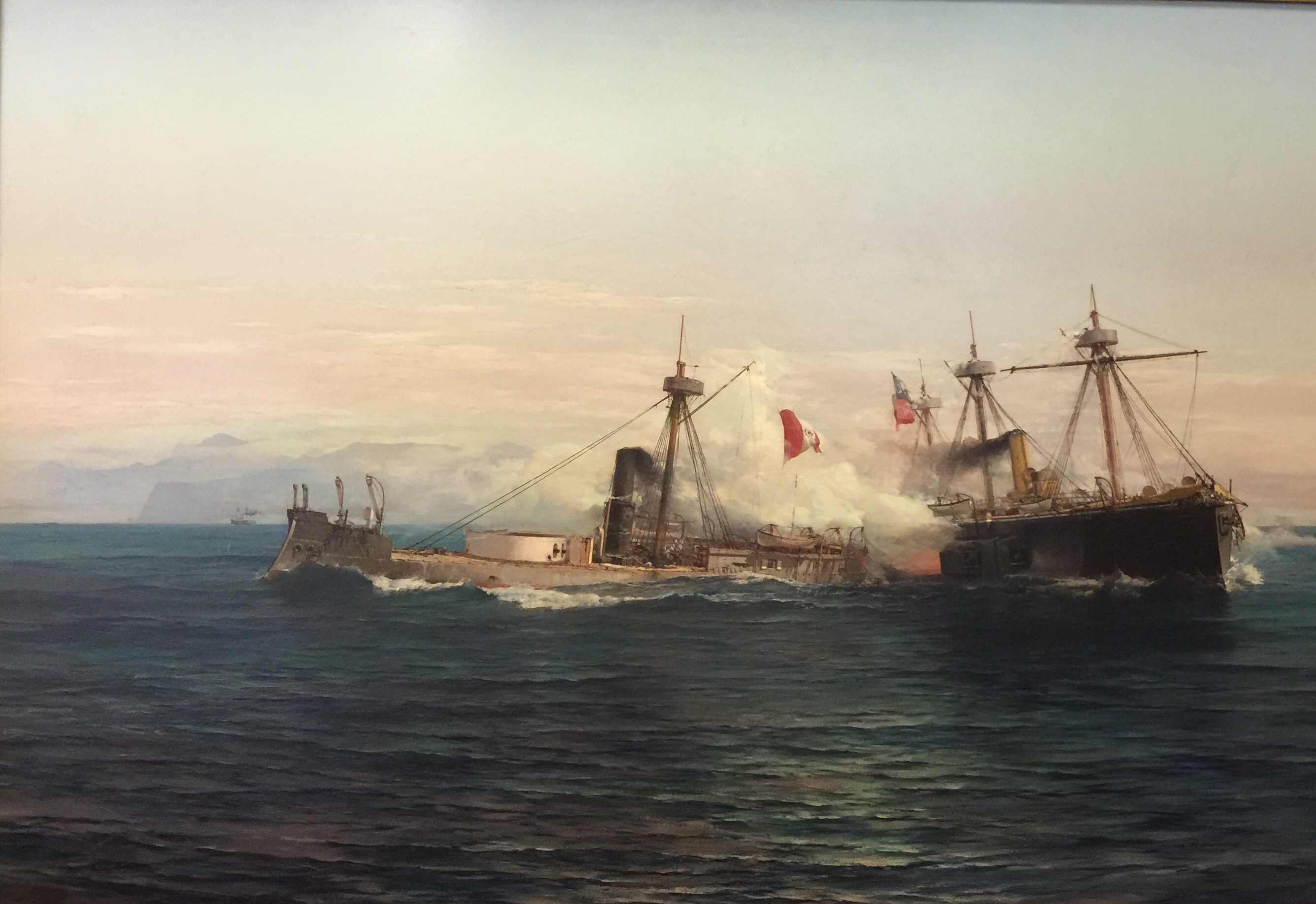
The Battle of Angamos

Huáscar participated in the War of the Pacific (1879–1883), initially in the service of Peru. Once again under the command of Captain Grau, she became famous for daring harassment raids on Chilean ports and transports. As a result, during the opening months of the war, the ground invasion was delayed for almost six months until the Chilean fleet could find and stop Huáscar.

On 21 May 1879 Huáscar led the lifting of the Chilean blockade of Iquique. During the Battle of Iquique, the Chilean captain of the corvette Esmeralda, Arturo Prat, was killed on Huáscar's deck. After sinking the corvette by repeated ramming, Huáscar rescued the survivors, then continued pursuit of a fleeing enemy ship, the Virgen de Covadonga, a one-time Spanish ship that was captured in the Battle of Papudo in 1865 and incorporated into the Chilean Navy.

During the next 137 days Huáscar not only evaded confrontation with the enemy fleet, following orders from the Peruvian government, but made the coast insecure for Chilean transport ships. Her biggest prize was the Chilean gunned transport Rímac with 260 men of the cavalry regiment "Carabineers of Yungay". On 28 August 1879 Huáscar attacked the Chilean corvette Abtao at Antofagasta with a self-propelled Lay torpedo only to have it reverse course; the Huascar was saved when Lieutenant Fermín Diez Canseco jumped overboard to divert the torpedo.

Determined to secure the supply lines needed for the invasion of Perú, the Chileans committed every possible unit to hunt down Huáscar. On 8 October 1879 Huáscar was captured by the Chilean Navy under the command of Galvarino Riveros Cárdenas at the Battle of Angamos, during which Rear Admiral Grau and 32 of her crew of 200 were killed.

== Career with Chilean Navy ==
=== War of the Pacific ===
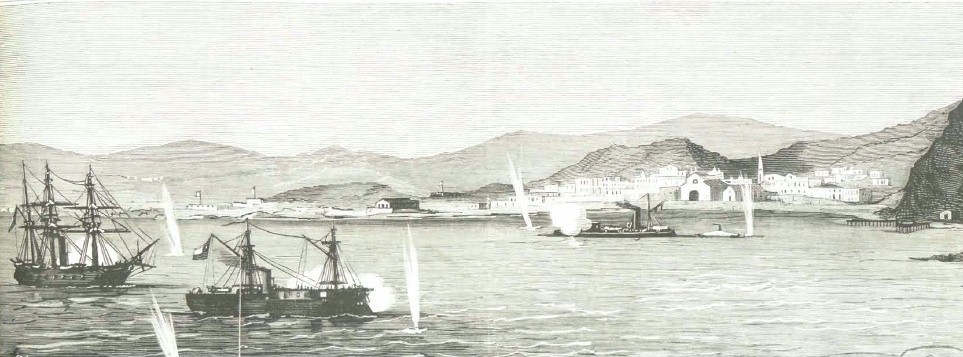
The Naval Battle of Arica

After the Battle of Angamos, Huáscar entered the service of the Chilean Navy. At Arica she fought a duel with the Peruvian monitor Manco Cápac while participating in the bombardment of the city – where her new commander Manuel Thomson was killed – and she also aided in the blockade of Callao.

=== After the war ===
After the war, in 1885 and 1887, Huáscar was renovated, including renewal of boilers, new screw design, and all-new steam engines to move the gun and artillery turrets.

In May 1888, as part of a ceremonial division commanded by Rear Admiral Luis Uribe, Huáscar brought the bodies of the officers of the Esmeralda from their graves at Iquique to a new burial place at Valparaíso. These were the same officers killed on Huáscar's deck at the Battle of Iquique; Rear Admiral Uribe had been the executive officer aboard Esmeralda and a survivor of the battle.

=== Chilean Civil War ===
Huáscar participated in the 1891 Chilean Civil War between government and congress. Undergoing major maintenance work at the onset of the war, she was seized and towed out of Valparaíso by the rebel-leaning navy, and readied for action within three days.

Commanded by Captain José María Santa Cruz, she participated in the takeover of the port city of Taltal by the rebels, ran escort duty for convoys and protected rebel-held ports. She returned once more to the port of Iquique, this time to bombard the port city held by government forces. After almost eight months of fighting, the war ended with the government's surrender.

=== Postwar ===
Huáscar continued serving the Chilean Navy until a boiler explosion in 1897 at the Talcahuano military harbour resulted in her decommissioning. Partially repaired, she later served as the first submarine tender in the Chilean Navy from 1917 to 1930.

In the early 1930s Huáscar was taken in hand for reconditioning as a heritage ship. Recommissioned in 1934, Huáscar was now armed with two 8-inch guns, three 4.7 inch guns and four 47 mm guns. It now wore the flag of the Port Admiral at Talcahuano. As late as 1949 she was listed in Jane's Fighting Ships as a coast defense ship; the photograph of Huáscar in that year's edition dated from 1938.

=== Preservation as memorial ship ===
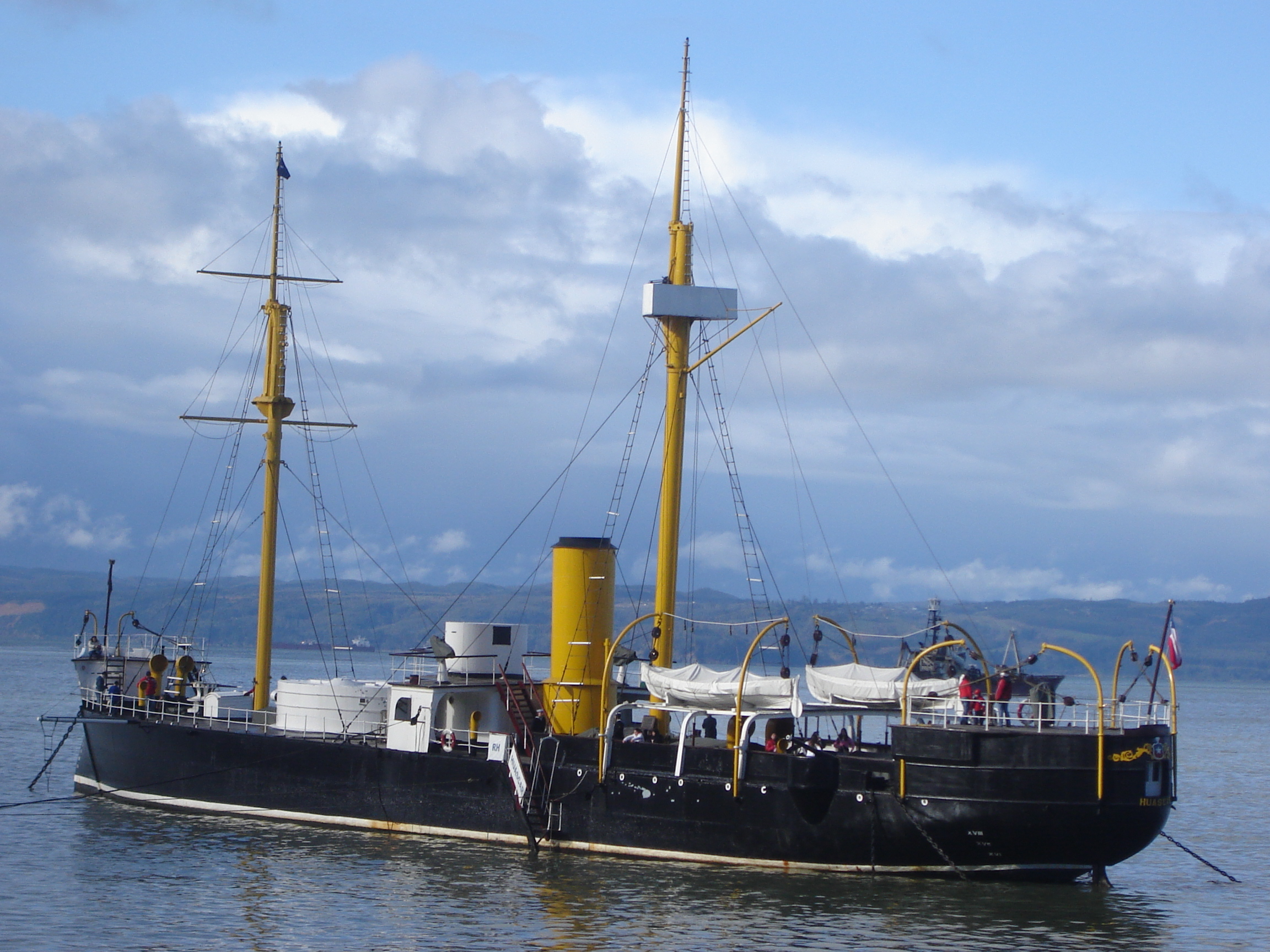
Huáscar anchored in the harbour at Talcahuano and painted in Victorian-era colours, 27 July 2005

When she was recommissioned in 1934, Huáscar was the oldest vessel of the Chilean Navy. In 1951 and 1952, work was undertaken with the aim to completely restore her to her 1897 condition, when she finished her service in the Chilean Navy, and declare her a shrine to the glory of both the Peruvian and Chilean navies.

She became a floating museum and a memorial, displaying many objects and relics recovered from Navy warehouses or donated by private citizens from the Talcahuano and Concepción area, including:

- A shrine with portraits of the three commanders that lost their lives on her deck, set in the commander's quarters.
- A portrait gallery in the boiler room.
- A prayer room, duly authorized by the Archbishop of Concepción

Between 1971 and 1972, a second restoration phase was undertaken at the Chilean Navy's drydock in Talcahuano: the hull was completely repaired, and engines rebuilt according to original blueprints obtained in England. Since then, a strict maintenance program ensures survival and preservation for future generations.

In 1995, the World Ship Trust conferred the Maritime Heritage Award on the Chilean Navy for its restoration of Huáscar. Huáscar is berthed at the port of Talcahuano, Chile. The Talcahuano Naval Base and Shipyards were devastated by the 2010 Chile earthquake and the resulting tsunami; although Huáscar was at the base then, she survived with no apparent damage and reopened to visitors in March 2011.

== Significance ==
Huáscar is one of the few early-ironclad-era warships still afloat. Huáscar remains highly regarded in both Peru and Chile, being considered as the site where Peruvian Admiral of the Fleet Miguel Grau, and the Chilean Captains Arturo Prat and Manuel Thomson each lost their lives in naval combat.

== Bibliography ==
- Gibbs, Jay (2008). "Question 38/43: Loss of Ottoman Gunboat Intibah". Warship International. XLV (4): 289–291. ISSN 0043-0374.
