= Spanish schooner Virgen de Covadonga =

Spanish Navy screw schooner commissioned in 1859

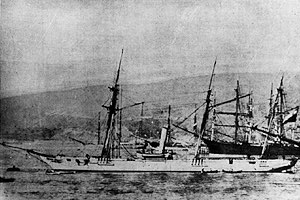
- Covadonga moored at Valparaíso, Chile, while in Chilean Navy service.

History

Spain
- Name: Virgen de Covadonga
- Namesake: Our Lady of Covadonga
- Ordered: 19 June 1857
- Builder: Arsenal de La Carraca, San Fernando, Spain
- Cost: 5,000,000 reales de vellón (880,833.50 pesetas)
- Laid down: 13 February 1858
- Launched: 28 November 1859
- Commissioned: 8 October 1859
- Captured: by Chilean Navy 26 November 1865

Chile
- Name: Covadonga
- Namesake: Truncation of Spanish name
- Acquired: 26 November 1865
- Commissioned: 4 December 1865
- Fate: Sunk by mine 13 September 1880

General characteristics
- Type: Screw schooner
- Displacement: 415 tons
- Tons burthen: 630 tons
- Length: 45.60 m (149 ft 7 in)
- Beam: 6.40 m (21 ft 0 in)
- Draft: 3.40 m (11 ft 2 in)
- Installed power: 160 hp (120 kW) (nominal); 390 ihp (290 kW) (indicated)
- Propulsion: One steam engine, one shaft
- Sail plan: Brigantine rig
- Speed: 6 to 8 knots (11 to 15 km/h; 6.9 to 9.2 mph) under steam
- Complement: 82 to 125 men
- Armament: As built: 2 x 200 mm (7.9 in) 68-pounder (31 kg) smoothbore guns; 1 x 160 mm (6.3 in) 32-pounder (14.5 kg) smoothbore swivel gun; Installed after 21 May 1879: 3 x 40-pounder (18.1 kg) guns; 2 x 9-pounder (4.1 kg) guns

Virgen de Covadonga (English: Virgin of Covadonga), sometimes referred to as Covadonga, was a Spanish Navy screw schooner commissioned in 1859. During the Chincha Islands War, she was captured by the Chilean Navy in the Battle of Papudo in 1865. Incorporated into the Chilean Navy, she initially was assigned to exploration missions and later to the Chilean Navy squadron that participated in the War of the Pacific (1879–1883). In the Battle of Punta Gruesa she defeated the Peruvian Navy broadside ironclad Independencia. She was sunk in 1880.

== Characteristics ==
Virgen de Covadonga was a screw schooner with a wooden hull. She displaced 415 tons. She was 45.60 metres (149 ft 7 in) long, 6.40 metres (21 ft 0 in) in beam, and 3.40 metres (11 ft 2 in) in draft. Her steam engine, manufactured by Factory No. 4 at Ferrol, Spain, was rated at a nominal 130 horsepower (97 kW) and produced 390 indicated horsepower (291 kW), giving her a maximum speed of 6 to 8 knots (11 to 15 km/h; 6.9 to 9.2 mph) under steam, although her boilers performed poorly in operational use. Her armament consisted of two 68-pounder (31 kg) 200-millimetre (7.9 in) smoothbore guns amidships and a 32-pounder (14.5 kg) 160-millimetre (6.3 in) smoothbore swivel gun on her bow. Her crew ranged in size during her history from 82 to 125 men.

== Construction and commissioning ==
A Royal Order of 10 June 1857 authorized Virgen de Covadonga′s construction. She was laid down at the Arsenal de la Carraca in San Fernando, Spain, on 13 February 1858. She was launched on 28 November 1859 and commissioned by Royal Command on 8 October 1858. Her construction cost was 5,000,000 reales de vellón or 880,833.50 pesetas. The Ministry of Overseas financed her construction.

== Service history ==
=== Spanish Navy ===
==== 1858–1865 ====
After entering service, Virgen de Covadonga was based at the Spanish naval base at Manila in the Philippines in the Spanish East Indies. She operated as a mail steamer between Manila and Hong Kong.

Amid growing tensions between Spain and Peru, Virgen de Covadonga was assigned to the Pacific Squadron for service in the southeastern Pacific Ocean off South America. The squadron commander, Contralmirante (Counter Admiral) Luis Hernández-Pinzón Álvarez, departed Cádiz, Spain, on 10 August 1862 with the screw frigates Resolución (his flagship) and Nuestra Señora del Triunfo with both the political-military task of demonstrating a Spanish presence in the Americas and a scientific research mission and had three zoologists, a geologist, a botanist, an anthropologist, a taxidermist, and a photographer aboard. The two screw frigates proceeded to the Río de la Plata (River Plate) on the coast of South American, where the screw corvette Vencedora joined them. Virgen de Covadonga soon rendezvoused with them there as well.

The four ships got underway from Montevideo, Uruguay, on 10 January 1863 and proceeded down the coast of Patagonia, passed the Falkland Islands, rounded Cape Horn on 6 February 1863, and entered the Pacific Ocean. They then stopped at the Chiloé Archipelago off the coast of Chile before continuing their voyage up the coasts of South America and North America, stopping at several ports before calling at San Francisco, California, in the United States from 9 October to 1 November 1863. They then headed southward and arrived at Valparaíso, Chile, on 13 January 1864.

At the time, Spain still had not recognized the independence of Chile and Peru from the Spanish Empire, and the presence of the Spanish warships on the Pacific coast of South America — especially in the aftermath of Spain's annexation of the First Dominican Republic in 1861 and Spanish involvement in a multinational intervention in Mexico in 1861–1862 — raised suspicions in South America as to the intentions of the Spanish government. In retaliation for various hostile actions against Spanish citizens and property in Peru, Pinzón's squadron seized the Chincha Islands from Peru on 14 April 1864 without authorization from the Spanish government, taking several Peruvians prisoner. With tensions spiking between Spain and Peru, Resolución and Nuestra Señora del Triunfo covered an operation in which many of the Spaniards in Peru embarked on the steamer Heredia at Callao and Virgen de Covadonga towed Heredia out of the harbor under the guns of Peruvian Navy warships that were ready to open fire. Spain and Peru avoided war, but Pinzón resigned his command on 9 November 1864 because he felt that the Spanish government had not supported his actions, and Vicealmirante (Vice Admiral) José Manuel Pareja took charge of the Pacific Squadron.

An accidental fire destroyed Nuestra Señora del Triunfo on 25 November 1864, but Pareja's squadron received reinforcements on 30 December 1864 when the screw frigates Berenguela, Reina Blanca, and Villa de Madrid joined it. Tensions with Peru remained high, and a member of Resolución′s crew was killed while on leave at Callao. Pareja attempted to settle affairs with Peru by signing the Vivanco–Pareja Treaty with a Peruvian government representative aboard Villa de Madrid (Pareja's flagship), but the Peruvian Congress viewed it as a humiliation and refused to ratify it, and the failed treaty instead sparked the outbreak of the Peruvian Civil War of 1865 in February 1865. In May 1865 the armoured frigate Numancia and the transport Marqués de la Victoria arrived to reinforce the Pacific Squadron.

==== Chincha Islands War ====
The political situation in the southeastern Pacific further deteriorated during 1865 when Pareja steamed to Valparaíso to settle Spanish claims against Chile. When Chile refused to settle, Pareja announced a blockade of Chilean ports, and the Chincha Islands War broke out between Spain and Chile on 24 September 1865. The blockade spread the Pacific Squadron thinly along the Chilean coast, with Virgen de Covadonga assigned the task of blockading Coquimbo.

After Reina Blanca relieved her on station off Coquimbo, Virgen de Covadonga began a voyage to the waters off Valparaíso. While near Papudo, she sighted a screw corvette flying the British flag at 07:00 on 26 November 1865. The approaching ship was in fact the Chilean Navy corvette Esmeralda, which closed the range and fire a full starboard broadside at Virgen de Covadonga. In the ensuing Battle of Papudo, Virgen de Covadonga returned fire, but Esmeralda scored a number of hits that inflicted heavy casualties on Virgen de Covadonga′s crew. Virgen de Covadonga attempted to disengage and flee, but Esmeralda pursued her and continued to fire at her. Slower and outgunned, Virgen de Covadonga surrendered to the Chileans at 07:30.

Early setbacks in the war culminating in the humiliating loss of Virgen de Covadonga prompted Pareja to commit suicide aboard Villa de Madrid off Valparaíso, shooting himself in his cabin on 28 November 1865 while lying on his bed wearing his dress uniform. He was buried at sea, and Numancia′s commanding officer, Contralmirante (Counter Admiral) Casto Méndez Núñez, took command of the Pacific Squadron on 12 December 1865.

Peru joined the war against Spain on 14 January 1866, as did Ecuador on 30 January. After bringing aboard supplies from a newly arrived Spanish frigate, Méndez Núñez's squadron began operations to find and recapture Virgen de Covadonga. The squadron first searched the Juan Fernández Islands and then Puerto Inglés on Chiloé Island in the Chiloé Archipelago off Chile without finding her.

=== Chilean Navy ===
==== Chincha Islands War ====
Meanwhile, Virgen de Covadonga was commissioned into Chilean Navy service on 4 December 1865 with her name shortened to Covadonga. She became part of a combined Chilean-Peruvian squadron which also included the Peruvian Navy frigate Apurímac and corvettes América and Unión.

In February 1866, Méndez Núñez sent Villa de Madrid and Reina Blanca south to destroy the Chilean-Peruvian squadron. The Spanish frigates found the allied squadron anchored and immobilized in an inlet on the Chilean coast in the Chiloé Archipelago at Abtao Island on 7 February 1866. In the resulting Battle of Abtao, the Spanish ships were reluctant to close with the allied squadron because of a fear of running aground in shallow water. Apurímac opened fire at 16:15, and an indecisive exchange of long-range gunfire ensued over the course of about 90 minutes in which the ships fired about 1,700 rounds and Covadonga scored several hits on Reina Blanca. The Spanish frigates displayed good marksmanship but had little success and ultimately withdrew as darkness fell to avoid wasting ammunition. During the engagement, Villa de Madrid was hit seven times in her hull and four times in her masts and rigging, while Reina Blanca was hit eight times in her hull and eight in her masts and rigging. The Spanish frigates withdrew the next day and returned to the waters off Valparaíso, where the Spanish Pacific Squadron had concentrated.

==== War of the Pacific ====
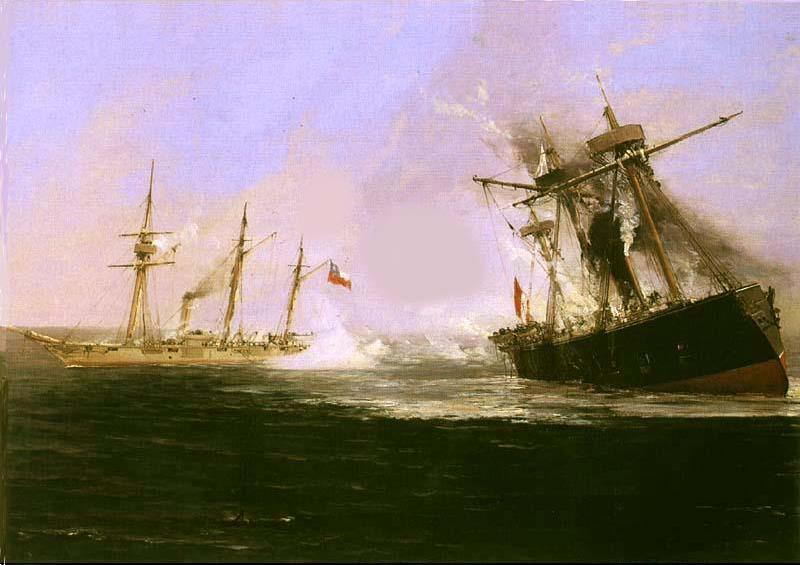
Covadonga fires at the grounded Independencia on 21 May 1879.

During the War of the Pacific (1879–1883), Covadonga and Esmeralda, as the oldest and slowest ships of the Chilean Navy, were left behind to blockade the port of Iquique. There they participated in the Battle of Iquique, one of the most important naval battles of the war, on 21 May 1879. Esmeralda faced the Peruvian ironclad Huáscar while Covadonga engaged the Peruvian ironclad Independencia in a separate action known as the Battle of Punta Gruesa. When Independencia struck a submerged rock, Covadonga turned around, came up aft of Independencia, and raked her stern with gunfire, forcing her surrender.

On 13 September 1880, while enforcing a blockade in the port of Chancay, Peru, Covadonga′s sighted a drifting, unmanned boat loaded with fresh fruit and produce. When they tried to lift the boat out of the water, it exploded, as the Peruvians had rigged it as a floating mine. Covadonga sank in less than 10 minutes. Out of the 109 men of her crew, the commanding officer, Pablo Ferrari, and 32 sailors died. The Chilean gunboat Pilcomayo rescued 29 survivors, and the Peruvians took 48 other survivors prisoner.
