= First Battle of Antofagasta =

1879 naval battle during the War of the Pacific

- Part of Naval campaign of the War of the Pacific
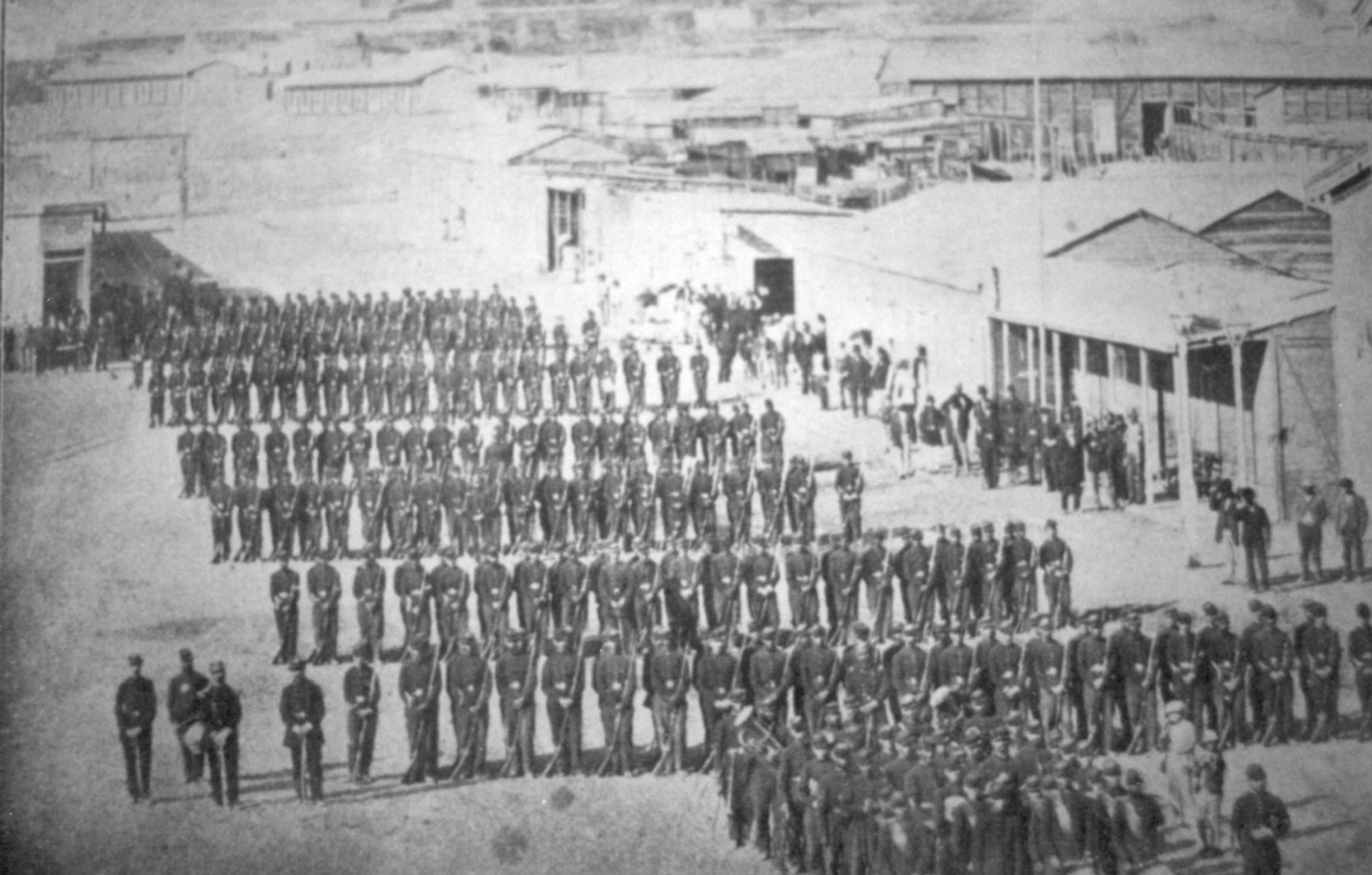
- Chilean soldiers in Antofagasta
Date	May 26, 1879
Location	Antofagasta, Antofagasta Region, Chile
Result	Peruvian victory

Belligerents
Peru	Chile

Commanders and leaders
Miguel Grau	Justo Arteaga Cuevas; Carlos Condell

Strength
1 ironclad (Huáscar)	3 x 150 lb. cannons 1 schooner (Virgen de Covadonga)

Casualties and losses
1 killed, 2 wounded	1 cannon 220 killed or wounded

The First Battle of Antofagasta or the Bombardment of Antofagasta took place during the War of the Pacific. It was the first nightly raid of the War as well as the first raid of the Huáscar in a campaign to destroy and capture Chilean ports and ships.

== Background ==
The Huáscar had sailed from Iquique on May 24 at 5:30 am to carry out harassing operations against the Chilean forces occupying Antofagasta.

On May 22, the Huanay, Itata, Rímac and Valdivia transports arrived in Antofagasta, the first 3 leased from CSAV and the last, a steamer that was docked due to its poor condition. The landing began on the 23rd, and ended on the 24th. This last day, Division General Justo Arteaga Cuevas, Commander in Chief of the Army of the North, he was sent to Tocopilla to the Itata to tow the schooner Covadonga to Antofagasta, but that same day, the Covadonga sailed to Cobija and from there continued to Antofagasta. Then, on the 25th, Arteaga ordered the Rímac search and tow to Covadonga, doing so and anchoring in Antofagasta at 5 pm that same day. Shortly afterwards the Itata arrived, which evaded the pursuit of the Huáscar.

The Huáscar, at 6:45 am on May 25, sighted a steamer coming from the south, which it pursued for 4 hours without reaching it. She arrived in Mejillones at 3 pm and found out about the landing of troops in Antofagasta on the 23rd and that the steamer she was chasing was the Itata.

=== Defenses of Antofagasta ===
They were composed of 3 batteries located north, center and south of the port. Each had a 150 lb Armstrong gun. The condensing machine was protected by an iron plate and by 9 Krupp cannons that belonged to the Chilean Army, 4 of caliber 7.85 cm L/25 and 5 of 6 cm L/21.

== The Battle ==
The Huáscar had been sailing from Mejillones when at 8:30 a.m. on May 26, off Antofagasta, it sighted the Rímac, chasing it until 10:30 a.m., when Captain Miguel Grau Seminario determined that he could not reach it due to the greater Chilean speed, ordering to return to Antofagasta. At 12:30 pm, the Huáscar sighted the Itata, which fled to the north and hunted it for 2 hours without reaching it either, during which time the Huáscar fired 3 shots and from land, 2 shots were fired back.

The Huáscar returned to Antofagasta at 5 pm and made reconnaissance of the port for half an hour. La Covadonga was anchored in the pool, a place sheltered from the breakers and close to the beach, where it could be defended by artillery and infantry on land and hidden behind merchant ships. General Arteaga moved his troops, so as not to unnecessarily expose the fires of the Peruvian ironclad, to Carmen Alto, leaving only a small infantry garrison on the beach and two batteries assembled by Krupp in order to oppose possible landings by the garrison of the Peruvian ironclad and protect the port, whose destruction would have put the population and the Chilean Army in danger. Arteaga gave the order not to shoot while the Huáscar did not fire on the Covadonga.

At 5:15 pm, with the Huáscar 1,945 yards from the batteries, Grau ordered to open fire on the tall chimneys of the water condensing machines, the saltpeter factory, and the north fort. A fight began between the land batteries and the Covadonga against the Huáscar, which lasted until 7:15 p.m. The Huáscar fired 16 shots with its 300- pound guns and 8 with the 40-pound ones, while the ground batteries and Covadonga fired more than 80 shots and the army's field batteries, from 120 to 180. The north fort was silenced and dismantled with ten shots and the south fort with eight. The Huáscar ended the battle when the artillery duel died down: twenty minutes Grau waited for the answer to his last shot. Captain Grau commented:

I could have continued, since he had been provoked, but the consideration of harming neutral interests and that this attack was directed against defenseless residents, although I am not responsible for the results, I decided to not undertake it.

General Arteaga stated in a letter to his son:

The attack on this ship, if not set on fire or spilled blood, has disrupted and paralyzed all operations, and made us spend more than two thousand pesos to save food and other objects that the fire could destroy. I sent the troops out into the ravines fearing a bomb would fall on their barracks. The General Staff with me were in the batteries, whose fires, if they did not do Huáscar much harm, made it remain at a respectable distance. The population fled in its entirety and the scarcity of water was unfortunate.

At night, the Huáscar was at sea, returning to port on the 27th. At noon it lowered two boats to trace the submarine cable that connected Caldera and Valparaíso with Antofagasta, cutting it off at 4:30 pm, without being disturbed from land. At 5 p.m., the Huáscar sighted the steamer Ayacucho of the Pacific Steam Navigation Company, which was en route from Callao to Valparaíso. She then obtained information about the presence of the Chilean squadron in Pisagua on the 26th, so Grau decided to return to Callao, setting sail at 8:45 p.m.

== Aftermath ==
The battle ended in a Peruvian victory with the Peruvians did manage to cut the submarine telegraph cable, leaving Antofagasta cut off from Chile, since the cable connected it with Caldera and Valparaíso. However, Grau did not consider it pertinent to destroy the water condensing machine so as not to cause a drought on Antofagasta. Grau did not shell the Covadonga either although the Chilean ship was not the Huáscar's target. 100 Chilean soldiers were killed in ground combat and according to a letter from General Arteaga to his son, there were no human losses to regret, although operations were halted.
