= Justo Arteaga =

Chilean military commander (1805–1882)

Justo Arteaga Cuevas
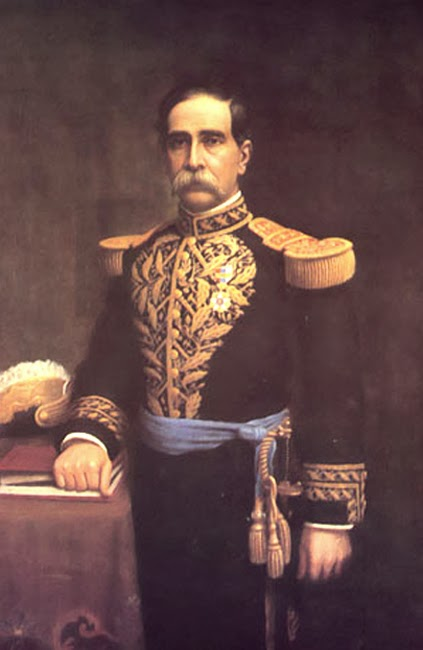

Commander-in-Chief of the Chilean Army
- In office 8 April 1879 – 18 July 1879
- President: Aníbal Pinto
- Preceded by: Basilio Urrutia
- Succeeded by: Erasmo Escala

Personal details
- Born: 10 April 1805 Santiago, Captaincy General of Chile, Viceroyalty of Peru
- Died: 9 July 1882 (aged 77) Santiago, Santiago Metropolitan Region, Chile
- Education: Liberator Bernardo O'Higgins Military School

Military service
- Allegiance: Patria Vieja; Patria Nueva; Conservative Republic; Liberal Republic
- Branch: Chilean Army
- Years of service: 1814 – 1882
- Rank: Major General
- Battles/wars: Chilean War of Independence: Battle of Rancagua; 1851 Chilean Revolution: Urriola Mutiny; Chincha Islands War; War of the Pacific: Naval campaign of the War of the Pacific; First Battle of Antofagasta

Justo José Arteaga Cuevas (1805-1882) was a Chilean Major General who participated throughout Chile's conflicts during the 19th-century as well as being the Commander-in-Chief of the Chilean Army from 8 April to 18 July 1879.

== Early years ==
Justo was the son of Domingo Arteaga Rojas, who was later a lieutenant colonel in the Chilean Army, and Ana Josefa de las Cuevas. His father, who was a great friend and aide to the liberator Bernardo O'Higgins, made him enter the Army with the rank of cadet when he was just 9 years old. However, his military career was suspended by the royalist triumph at the Battle of Rancagua, resulting in the return of the colonial system, thus beginning the Reconquest.

During the period known as the Patria Vieja, he finished his youth training and in 1819 he was promoted to the rank of second lieutenant of the "Grenadiers of the Honor Guard" Regiment which was in charge of escorting the supreme director. In 1820 he was promoted to the rank of second lieutenant and the following year, to first lieutenant.

== Pronouncement against the Government ==
On 28 January 1823 the pronouncement of his unit against the government of Bernardo O'Higgins broke out. The then lieutenant Justo Arteaga was the second assistant of the Argentine colonel José Luis Pereira, commander of the Guard of Honor, so he followed his chief and stuck to the opposition flags. He was ordered to inform General O'Higgins of the order of the Argentine officer, this order was the prohibition of O'Higgins to approach the Guard of Honor barracks. Bernardo O'Higgins needed these troops to prevail over the Cabildo de Santiago, so he marched towards the barracks at the Convent of San Agustín. The march was carried out together with his hostess and even with Justo Arteaga's father. Lieutenant Arteaga, aware of the danger his father and the supreme director were running, told them that there was a group of riflemen who were going to open fire on them when they approached the barracks. O'Higgins was furious and informed Colonel Pereira of his immediate presentation to him. Colonel Pereira accepted and O'Higgins appeared at Justo Arteaga's side, neutralizing the actions of the riflemen in the tower.

== Chiloé Campaign ==
In 1823 he was promoted to captain and in January 1826 the second campaign against Chiloé took place, culminating in the capture of the island, after a resistance by the forces of Antonio de Quintanilla. Captain Arteaga was awarded a medal to the "Liberating Army of Chiloé". On the island of Chiloé he participated in the attack on the batteries of San Carlos de Ancud, in the Battle of Pudeto and in the Battle of Bellavista. He also participated in the Treaty of Tantauco on 19 January 1826, in which the royalist general Antonio de Quintanilla handed over the island of Chiloé to the Chilean forces, after 7 years of resistance.

== Against the Pincheira brothers ==
In 1828 the Government of Chile was fighting against the Pincheira brothers, who were an infamous gang of thieves and rustlers who acted between 1818 and 1832 in Chile and Argentina. The then captain Arteaga participated in the expedition against this group, supporting the government of Francisco Antonio Pinto. On 20 September 1829 he was promoted to the rank of Sergeant Major and was assigned to the Army of the South, remaining under the orders of General Joaquín Prieto, becoming his right-hand man and participating the following year in the Battle of Ochagavía.

== Chilean Revolution of 1851 ==
In 1851, due to his political beliefs, he was called to qualify services and had to leave the country, but he returned to take part in the revolution, joining the forces that defended the freedom of suffrage and criticized the electoral fraud that led to the presidency led by Manuel Mont Torres. However he had betrayed the liberal cause by not showing up for the fight in the Alameda de Santiago, known as the Sociedad de la Igualdad. He fled to Cobija, Bolivia where he learned of the uprising in La Serena, under the command of José Miguel Carrera Fontecilla, son of the war hero of the same name. Carrera's son appointed him commander of the Army of Coquimbo but Cuevas was defeated in the Battle of Petorca from an enemy army that was twice his size. Returning to La Serena, he carried out a white coup that deprived Carrera of command and sent him to prison, thus dividing the egalitarian officers.

La Serena was bombarded by both the Chilean army and by a British squad that, at the request of President Manuel Montt, acted by capturing the two rebel steamers Arauco and Firefly, since the Chilean navy was completely under sail and useless against its opponents. In addition, from Copiapó, a column of 1,000 Argentine mercenaries advanced who worked in the mines of at Chañarcillo, Copiapó and Huasco and who had fled the tyranny of Rosas and were armed by José Joaquín Vallejo who was an agent of Montt's government in Atacama.

The Serenense forts lasted for so long thanks to the engineering of Justo Arteaga. In combat he remained fierce, as did Carrera, who was allowed to leave his cell to fight alongside the others. The artillerymen were mostly miners from Brillador and other mines in the Coquimbo province, among them, some veterans of the War of the Confederation, for which they were called "yungayes".

When he realized that the chances of success for the cause were slim, he decided to take a ship and go into exile. He narrowly escaped execution by firing squad. Meanwhile, the officers and the troops disavowed their boss and continued the fight until 31 December 1851, when they withdrew to Copiapó, where the revolution had broken out under the command of the merchant Bernardino Barahona.

A portion of stragglers was intercepted by a squad of Argentine mercenaries. Among them was a Chilean priest who interceded between the sides, managing to lay down their arms. Once, deprived of them, the gauchos slaughtered more than forty miners, until a Chilean cavalry patrol managed to stop them. Among the Argentine leaders were Carlos Tejedor, Chacho Peñaloza, Juan Crisóstomo Álvarez and Felipe Varela.

== Chincha Islands War ==
He was reinstated again in the Army in 1862, as a colonel. In 1865 he was appointed by Supreme Decree Commander General of Engineers. In 1866 he commanded the I Division of troops that defended Valparaíso in the Chincha Islands War.

== War of the Pacific ==
In 1874 he was promoted to Major General, and on 8 April 1879 he was appointed Commander-in-Chief of the Chilean Army in the Field during the War of the Pacific.

However, his performance during his tenure in office until 18 July 1879 had been a source of controversy. The appointment of him at 74 years of age was unusual and Arteaga was considered by W. Sater to be "senescent". At this point, he was described as florid, overweight, senile, and had no other qualities but strong political backing. Gonzalo Bulnes maintained that his appointment was not correct:

for a fast, audacious company, of violent initiative, like the one that the Prats Ministry yearned for, because companies of that kind do not harmonize with old age, and Arteaga was an old man who had heard the shots of the War of Independence, and attended to his last war duties, half a century earlier.

But not only his age but also his attachment to daily politics and the defense and support of his family:

Arteaga had the conditions of his age: he was susceptible, not at all inclined to listen to other people's advice. He mistrusted any collaboration, considering it a depression of his authority. In his opinion, he and his children were enough. He wanted to keep the treasure of attributions intact. Conferred by the Army Ordinance as General-in-Chief on campaign, and removed from himself any influence that could undermine it.

William F. Sater also criticized Arteaga, stating:

Justo Arteaga Cuevas was sclerotic, apathetic, easily confused, and unable to think for himself. ...unable to formulate an overall strategy for the ground campaign.

Erasmo Escala Arriagada succeeded Arteaga after he resigned in July 1879.
