= Treaty of Valparaiso =

1884 treaty between Chile and Bolivia

Truce Pact between Bolivia and Chile
- Signed: 4 April 1884
- Location: Valparaiso, Chile
- Signatories: Bolivia; Chile
- Languages: Spanish

Full text
- Truce Pact between Bolivia and Chile at Wikisource

The Treaty of Valparaiso was an agreement between Chile and Bolivia that ended the War of the Pacific. Signed on April 4, 1884, the third treaty of the war forced Bolivia to give Antofagasta to Chile.

== See also ==
Works related to Truce Pact between Bolivia and Chile at Wikisource
