= War of the Pacific =

Territorial conflict between Chile and allied Peru and Bolivia (1879–84)

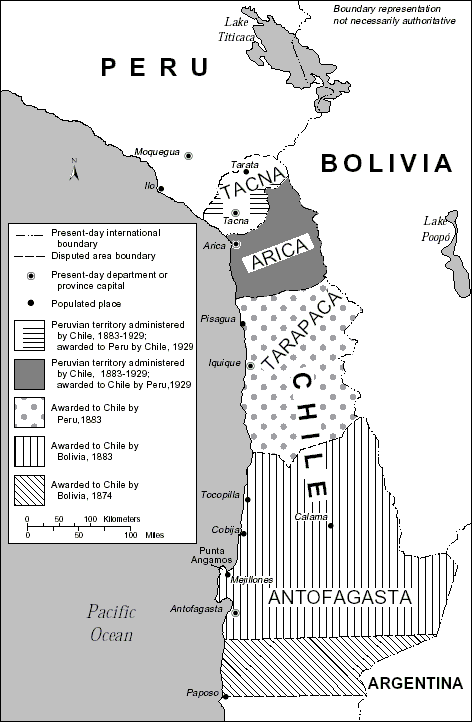
- Map showing changes of territory due to the war
Date	14 February 1879 – 4 April 1884 (5 years, 1 month and 21 days)
Location	Pacific coast of Peru, Bolivia and Chile, the Atacama Desert, and coastal and mountainous regions of Peru
Result	Chilean victory; Treaty of Ancón (between Chile and Peru in 1883); Pact of Valparaiso (between Bolivia and Chile in 1884)
Territorial changes	Peru formally cedes the Tarapacá Department to Chile and grants it temporary control of the provinces of Arica and Tacna. Bolivia accepts Chilean administration of the Litoral Department, thus becoming a landlocked country

Belligerents
Bolivia; Peru	Chile

Commanders and leaders
Hilarión Daza; Pedro J. de Guerra; Narciso Campero; Mariano I. Prado; Luis La Puerta; Nicolás de Piérola; Francisco García C.; Lizardo Montero; Miguel Iglesias	Aníbal Pinto; D. Santa María

Strength
In 1879 (prewar); Bolivian Army: 1,687; Peruvian Army: 5,557; Peruvian Navy: 4 ironclads; 7 wooden ships; 2 torpedo boats; In 1880; Peruvian Army: 25,000–35,000 men; (Army of Lima); Peruvian Navy: 3 ironclads; 7 wooden ships; 2 torpedo boats	In 1879 (prewar); Chilean Army: 2,440 men; Chilean Navy: 2 ironclads; 9 wooden ships; 4 torpedo boats; In 1880; Chilean Army: 27,000 (Ante Lima); 8,000 (Occupation Force); 6,000 (Mainland); Chilean Navy: 3 ironclads; 8 wooden ships; 10 torpedo boats

Casualties and losses
Killed and wounded: About 25,000 killed; Captured: About 9,000	Killed: 2,425–2,791; Wounded: 6,247–7,193

The War of the Pacific (Spanish: Guerra del Pacífico), also known by multiple other names, was a war between Chile and a Bolivian–Peruvian alliance from 1879 to 1884. Fought over Chilean claims on coastal Bolivian territory in the Atacama Desert, the war ended with victory for Chile, which gained a significant amount of resource-rich territory from Peru and Bolivia. The war demonstrated Chile's military-technological superiority over its opponents at the time.

The direct cause of the war was a nitrate taxation dispute between Bolivia and Chile, with Peru being drawn in due to its secret alliance with Bolivia. Some historians have pointed to deeper origins of the war, such as the interest of Chile and Peru in the nitrate business, a long-standing rivalry between Chile and Peru for regional hegemony, as well as the political and economical disparities between the stability of Chile and the volatility of Peru and Bolivia. (Note: Ronald Bruce St. John states in The Bolivia–Chile–Peru Dispute in the Atacama Desert: Even though the 1873 treaty and the imposition of the 10 centavos tax proved to be the casus belli, there were deeper, more fundamental reasons for the outbreak of hostilities in 1879. On the one hand, there was the power, prestige, and relative stability of Chile compared to the economic deterioration and political discontinuity which characterised both Peru and Bolivia after independence. On the other, there was the ongoing competition for economic and political hegemony in the region, complicated by a deep antipathy between Peru and Chile. In this milieu, the vagueness of the boundaries between the three states, coupled with the discovery of valuable guano and nitrate deposits in the disputed territories, combined to produce a diplomatic conundrum of insurmountable proportions.) In February 1878, Bolivia increased taxes on the Chilean mining company Compañía de Salitres y Ferrocarril de Antofagasta (CSFA), in violation of the Boundary Treaty of 1874 which established the border between both countries and prohibited tax increases for mining. Chile protested the violation of the treaty and requested international arbitration, but the Bolivian government, presided by Hilarión Daza, considered this an internal issue subject to the jurisdiction of the Bolivian courts. Chile insisted that the breach of the treaty would mean that the territorial borders denoted in it were no longer settled. Despite this, Daza rescinded the license of the Chilean company, seized its assets and put it up for auction. On the day of the auction, 14 February 1879, Chile's armed forces occupied without resistance the Bolivian port city of Antofagasta, which was mostly inhabited by Chilean miners. War was declared between Bolivia and Chile on 1 March 1879, and between Chile and Peru on 5 April 1879.

Battles were fought on the Pacific Ocean, in the Atacama Desert, the Peruvian deserts, and the mountainous interior of Peru. For the first five months, the war played out in a naval campaign, as Chile struggled to establish a marine resupply corridor for its forces in the world's driest desert. Afterwards, Chile's land campaign overcame the Bolivian and Peruvian armies. Bolivia withdrew after the Battle of Tacna, on 26 May 1880, leaving allied Peru fighting alone for most of the war. Chilean forces occupied Peru's capital Lima in January 1881. Remnants and irregulars of the Peruvian army waged a guerrilla war but could not prevent war-weary Peruvian factions from reaching a peace deal with Chile involving territorial cessions.

Chile and Peru signed the Treaty of Ancón on 20 October 1883. Bolivia signed a truce with Chile in 1884. Chile acquired the Peruvian territory of Tarapacá, the disputed Bolivian department of Litoral (turning Bolivia into a landlocked country), and temporary control over the Peruvian provinces of Tacna and Arica. In 1904, Chile and Bolivia signed the Treaty of Peace and Friendship, which established definite boundaries. The 1929 Tacna–Arica compromise gave Arica to Chile and Tacna to Peru.

== Etymology ==
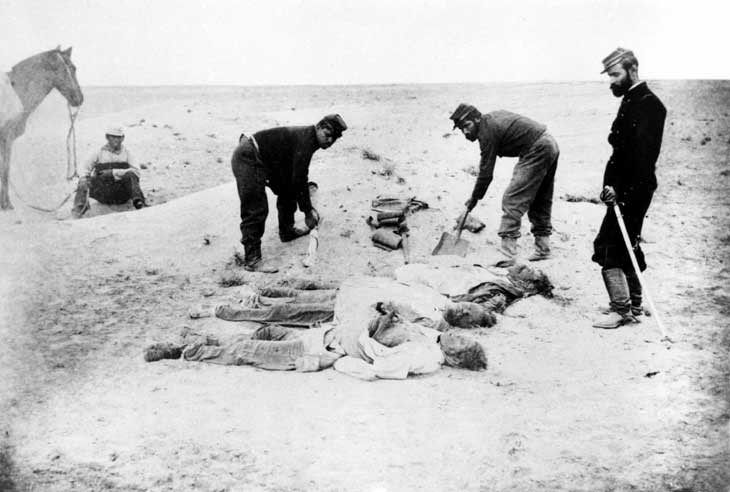
Chilean lieutenant Solo Zaldívar and two soldiers burying three Bolivian soldiers after the Battle of Tacna. The elevation behind them is also a burial ground of victims.

The conflict is also known as the "Saltpeter War", the "Ten Cents War" (in reference to the controversial ten-centavo tax imposed by the Bolivian government), the "Nitrate War", and the "Second Pacific War". It is not to be confused with the pre-Columbian Saltpeter War, in what is now Mexico, nor the "Guano War" as the Chincha Islands War is sometimes named. The war largely settled (or set up, depending on one's point of view) the "Tacna-Arica dispute" or "Tacna-Arica controversy", and is sometimes known by that name as well, although the details took decades to resolve.

Wanu (Spanish: guano) is a Quechua word for fertilizer. Potassium nitrate (ordinary saltpeter) and sodium nitrate (Chile saltpeter) are nitrogen-containing compounds collectively referred to as salpeter, saltpetre, salitre, caliche, or nitrate. They are used as fertilizer, but have other important uses. Saltpeter is used to make gunpowder.

Atacama is a Chilean region south of the Atacama Desert, which mostly coincides with the disputed Antofagasta province, known in Bolivia as Litoral.

== Background ==
The Atacama Desert border dispute between Bolivia and Chile (1825–1879)

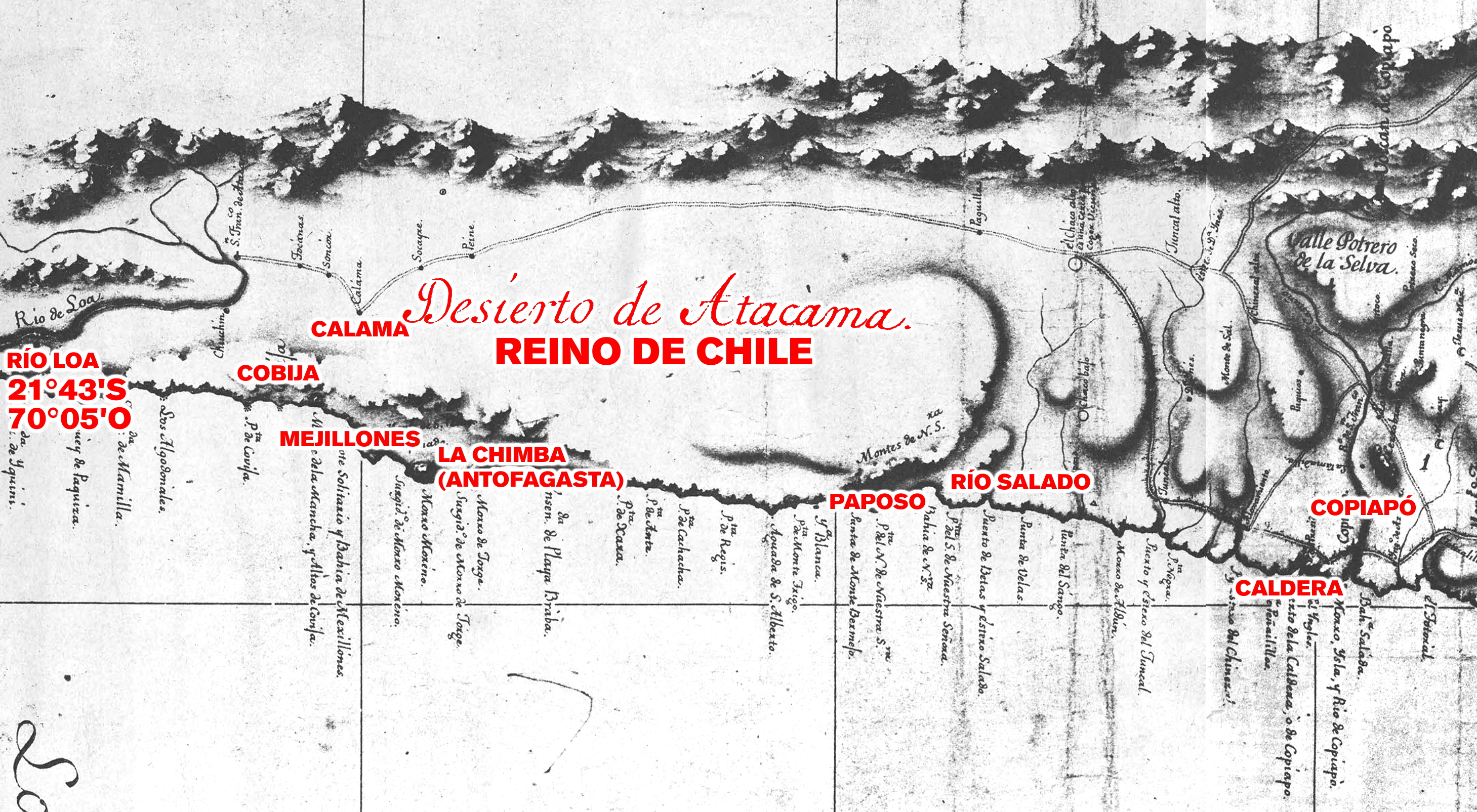
1793 Map of Andrés Baleato showing Peru and Chile's border inside the Spanish Empire.

When most of South America gained independence from Spain and Portugal in the 19th century the demarcation of frontiers was uncertain, particularly in remote, thinly populated portions of the newly independent nations. Bolivia and Chile's Atacama border dispute, in the coastal territories between approximately the 23° and 24° South parallels, was just one of several longstanding border conflicts that arose in South America.

Cobija, Paposo, Mejillones and the territory of Antofagasta appears on a 1793 map of Andrés Baleato and the 1799 map of the Spanish Navy as inside the jurisdiction of Chile, pointing out the Loa River as an internal limit of the Spanish Empire between Chile and Peru, leaving Charcas without sea access.

The dry climate of the Peruvian and Bolivian coasts had permitted the accumulation and preservation of vast amounts of high-quality guano deposits and sodium nitrate. In the 1840s, Europeans knew the value of guano and nitrate as fertilizer and the role of saltpeter in explosives. The Atacama Desert became economically important. Bolivia, Chile, and Peru were in the area of the largest reserves of a resource demanded by the world. During the Chincha Islands War (1864–1866), Spain, under Queen Isabella II, attempted to exploit an incident involving Spanish citizens in Peru to re-establish its influence over the guano-rich Chincha Islands.

Starting from the Chilean silver rush in the 1830s, the Atacama was prospected and populated by Chileans. Chilean and foreign enterprises in the region eventually extended their control to the Peruvian saltpeter works. In the Peruvian region of Tarapacá, Peruvians were a minority, behind both Chileans and Bolivians.

=== Boundary Treaty of 1866 ===
Bolivia and Chile negotiated the "Boundary Treaty of 1866," or the "Treaty of Mutual Benefits," which established 24° S "from the littoral of the Pacific to the eastern limits of Chile" as the mutual boundary. Both countries also agreed to share the tax revenue from mineral exports from the territory between 23° and 25° S. The bipartite tax collecting caused discontent, and the treaty lasted for only eight years.

=== Secret Treaty of Alliance of 1873 ===
In February 1873, Peru and Bolivia signed a secret treaty of alliance against Chile. The last clause kept it secret as long as both parties considered its publication unnecessary, until it was revealed in 1879. Argentina, long involved in a dispute with Chile over the Strait of Magellan and Patagonia, was secretly invited to join the pact, and in September 1873, the Argentine Chamber of Deputies approved the treaty and 6,000,000 Argentine peso for war preparations. Eventually, Argentina and Bolivia did not agree on the territories of Tarija and Chaco, and Argentina also feared an alliance of Chile with Brazil. The Argentine Senate postponed and then rejected the approval, but in 1875 and 1877, after border disputes with Chile flared up anew, Argentina sought to join the treaty. At the onset of the war, in a renewed attempt, Peru offered Argentina the Chilean territories from 24° to 27° S if Argentina adhered to the pact and fought in the war.

Historians including G. Bulnes, Basadre, and Yrigoyen agree that the real intention of the treaty was to compel Chile to modify its borders according to the geopolitical interests of Argentina, Peru, and Bolivia, as Chile was militarily weak before the arrival of the Chilean ironclads Almirante Cochrane and Blanco Encalada.

Chile was not informed about the pact until it learned of it, at first cursorily by a leak in the Argentine Congress in September 1873, when the Argentine Senate discussed the invitation to join the Peru-Bolivia alliance. The Peruvian mediator Antonio de Lavalle stated in his memoirs that he did not learn of it until March 1879, and Hilarion Daza was not informed of the pact until December 1878.

The Peruvian historian Basadre states that one of Peru's reasons for signing the treaty was to impede a Chilean-Bolivian alliance against Peru that would have given to Bolivia the region of Arica (almost all Bolivian commerce went through Peruvian ports of Arica before the war) and transferred Antofagasta to Chile. The Chilean offers to Bolivia to change allegiance were made several times even during the war and also from the Bolivian side at least six times.

On 26 December 1874, the recently built ironclad Cochrane arrived in Valparaíso and remained in Chile until the completion of the Blanco Encalada. That threw the balance of power in the South Pacific toward Chile.

Historians disagree on how to interpret the treaty. Some Peruvian and Bolivian historians assess it as rightful, defensive, circumstantial, and known by Chile from the very onset. Conversely, some Chilean historians assess the treaty as aggressive against Chile, causing the war, designed to take control by Peru of the Bolivian nitrate and hidden from Chile. The reasons for its secrecy, its invitation to Argentina to join the pact, and Peru's refusal to remain neutral are still discussed.

=== Boundary Treaty of 1874 ===
In 1874, Chile and Bolivia replaced the 1866 boundary treaty by keeping the boundary at 24° S but granting Bolivia the authority to collect all tax revenue between 23° and 24° S. To compensate for the relinquishment of its rights, Chile received a 25-year guarantee against tax increases on Chilean commercial interests and their exports.

Article 4 explicitly forbade tax increases on Chilean enterprises for 25 years:

The duties of exportation that may be levied on minerals exploited in the zone referred to in the preceding articles shall not exceed those now in force, and Chilean citizens, industry, and capital shall not be subjected to any other contributions what ever except those now existing. The stipulations in this article shall last for twenty-five years.

— Article 4, Chile-Bolivia Boundary Treaty of 1874

All disputes arising under the treaty would be settled by arbitration.

=== Causes of war ===
The historian William F. Sater gives several possible and compatible reasons for the war. He considers the causes to be domestic, economic, and geopolitical. Several authors agree with them, but others only partially support his arguments.

Some historians argue that Chile was devastated by the economic crisis of the 1870s and was looking for a replacement for its silver, copper and wheat exports. It has been argued that the economic situation and the view of new wealth in nitrate were the true reasons for the Chilean elite to go to war against Peru and Bolivia. The holder of the Chilean nitrate companies, according to Sater, "bulldozed" Chilean President Aníbal Pinto into declaring war to protect the owner of the Compañía de Salitres y Ferrocarril de Antofagasta (CSFA) and then to seize Bolivia's and Peru's salitreras (saltpeter works). Several members of the Chilean government were shareholders of CSFA, and they are believed to have hired the services of one of the country's newspapers to push their case.

Another US American historian, David Healy, rejects that thesis, and Fredrick B. Pike calls the allegation "absurd." The economic development that accompanied and followed the war was so remarkable that Marxist writers feel justified in alleging that Chile's great military adventure was instigated by self-seeking capitalists to bring their country out of the business stagnation that had begun in 1878 since the war provided Chile with the economic means to come of age. Sater states that that interpretation overlooks certain important facts. The Chilean investors in Bolivia correctly feared that Daza, the Bolivian dictator, would use the war as an excuse to expropriate their investments. Among them were Melchor de Concha y Toro, the politically powerful president of Chile's Camara de Diputados, Jerónimo Urmeneta, and Lorenzo Claro, a Chilean founder of the Banco de Bolivia and a prominent member of the National Party. A Santiago newspaper claimed that Melchor de Concha y Toro offered President Pinto 2,000,000 Chilean pesos to end the dispute and to return to the 1874 border. "In other words," writes W. Sater, "there were as many powerful interests opposed to helping the Compañía de Salitres as there were those seeking to aid the corporation." Also, B. Farcau objects to the argument: "On the other hand, the sorry state of the Chilean armed forces at the outbreak of the war, as will be discussed in the following chapter, hardly supports a theory of conscious, premeditated aggression."

Sater cites other sources that state that the true causes of the conflict were not economic but geopolitical, a struggle for control of the southeastern portion of the Pacific Ocean. In 1836 the Peruvian government tried to monopolize commerce in the South Pacific by rewarding ships that sailed directly to Callao, to the detriment of Valparaíso. Peru tried to impede the agreement that had been reached between Spain and Chile to free its new warships built and embargoed in Britain during the Chincha Islands War. Sater cites Germany's minister in Chile, who argued that the war with Peru and Bolivia would "have erupted sooner or later, [and] on any pretext." He considered that Bolivia and Peru had developed a "bitter envy" against Chile and its material progress and good government. Frederik B. Pike states: "The fundamental cause for the eruption of hostilities was the mounting power and prestige and the economic and political stability of Chile, on one hand, and the weakness and the political and economic deterioration of Bolivia, on the other.... The war—and its outcome—was as inevitable as the 1846—1848 conflict between the United States and Mexico. In both instances, a relatively well-governed, energetic, and economically expanding nation had been irresistibly tempted by neighboring territories that were underdeveloped, malgoverned, and sparsely occupied."

Another reason, according to Sater, was Peru's desire to monopolize and appropriate the nitrate works to strengthen its nitrate monopoly, which required the Bolivian and Chilean salitreras to be controlled by Peru. As unenviable as Chile’s situation was in the 1870s, that of Peru was much worse. The 1870s was for Peru's economy "a decade of crisis and change". Nitrate extraction rose while guano exports, the source of substantial revenue for Peru, declined from 575,000 tons in 1869 to less than 350,000 tons in 1873, and the Chincha Islands and other guano islands were depleted or nearly so.

William Edmundson writes in A History of the British Presence in Chile, "Peru has its own reasons to enter the dispute. Rory Miller (1993) argues that the depletion of guano resources and poor management of the economy in Peru had provoked a crisis. This has caused Peru to default on its external debt in 1876.... In that year [1875] the Peruvian government decided to procure a loan of seven millions pounds of which four millions pounds were earmarked to purchase privately owned oficinas [salitreras]... and Peru defaulted again in 1877."

To increase guano revenue, Peru created a monopoly on nitrate commerce in 1875. Its aims were to increase prices, curb exports and to impede competition, but most larger nitrate firms opposed the monopoly on sales of nitrate. When they were unsuccessful, Peru in 1876 began to expropriate nitrate producers and to buy nitrate concessions such as that of Henry Meiggs in Bolivia ("Toco", south of the Loa River). However, the CSFA was too expensive to be purchased. As Peruvian historian Alejandro Reyes states, the Bolivian salitreras needed to be controlled, which resulted in the internationalization of the conflict since they were owned by Chilean and European merchants. As the Chilean company was to be auctioned on 14 February 1879, in Antofagasta, it was considered that the Peruvian consul would be the highest bidder.

However, some sources, according to Sater, see the declarations of war between Chile and Peru as a product of popular domestic forces. The Peruvian President had to declare war to keep his position. Sater cites the British minister in Lima, Spencer St. John: "the rival parties may try to make political capital out of jealousy for the national honor, and His Excellency [Peruvian President Prado] may be forced to give way to the popular sentiment." Chilean President Pinto was under similar pressures. Bruce Farcau considers that to be the main cause for the war outbreak: "The argument that the attitude of the peoples of the region was just ripe for war seems best to fit the bill."

== Crisis ==
=== Ten Cents' Tax ===
License of 27 November 1873

Beginning in 1866, the Chilean entrepreneurs José Santos Ossa and Francisco Puelma exploited deposits of sodium nitrate in Bolivian territory (the salitreras named "Las Salinas" and "Carmen Alto", 122 kilometres (76 mi) and 128 kilometres (80 mi) from Antofagasta, respectively) and secured concessions from Bolivian President Mariano Melgarejo.

In 1868, a company named Compañía Melbourne Clark was established in Valparaíso, Chile, with 34% British capital provided by Antony Gibbs & Sons of London, which also held shares of salitreras in Peru. Its shareholders included a number of leading Chilean politicians. The company obtained a license from the Melgarejo administration to construct a railroad from Antofagasta to Salinas, and was renamed Compañía de Salitres y Ferrocarril de Antofagasta (CSFA).

In 1871, a new Bolivian government canceled all contracts signed by Melgarejo, but on 22 November 1872, a Bolivian decree allowed the government to renegotiate the contracts.

On 27 November 1873, CSFA obtained a license from the new administration in Bolivia to exploit saltpeter without duty for 15 years, but a dispute arose regarding whether the original 1872 decree, under which the 1873 license was issued, required the authorization of the Bolivian Congress. (Note: The Bolivian law of 22 November said (Querejazu 1979, pp. 181–182): Se autoriza al Ejecutivo para transar sobre indemnización y otros reclamos pendientes en la actualidad, y para acordar con las partes interesadas la forma más conveniente en que habrán de llenarse sus obligaciones respectivas; defiriéndose estos asuntos, sólo en los casos de no avenimiento, a la decisión de la Corte Suprema, con cargo a dar cuenta a la próxima legislatura.) Some lawyers placed emphasis on con cargo a dar cuenta a la próxima legislatura (Spanish for: "to be considered during the next legislative session [of the parliament]"), but others on sólo en los casos de no avenimiento (Spanish for "only in cases that no settlement [is reached]").

Peruvian monopoly of saltpeter

In 1873, the Peruvian government dictated the Ley del estanco del salitre, which limited the saltpeter production and authorized the government to purchase the whole production to a fixed price. However, the plan failed, and the law was repealed. In 1875, the Peruvian government expropriated the salitreras of Tarapacá to create a monopoly in guano and nitrate, and in 1876, Antony Gibbs & Sons became the consignee of the nitrate trade for the Peruvian government. President Mariano Ignacio Prado was "determined to complete the monopoly," and in 1876, Peru bought the nitrate licenses for "El Toco" auctioned by a Bolivian decree of 13 January 1876. However, the Chilean company remained the most serious competitor and clearly weakened Peru's monopoly. President Pardo, Prado's predecessor, had urged Gibbs to secure the monopoly by limiting the CSFA's output, and Henry Gibbs had warned the CSFA's board of directors in a letter on 16 April 1878, that its refusal to limit its output would bring administrative trouble with Peru and Bolivia "as it is made more and more to the interest of a neighboring Government that they should be so."

Gibbs made repeated unsuccessful efforts in 1876 and 1877 to persuade Edwards, the Chilean majority shareholder, to accept a limit to its production.

The historian Ronald Bruce St. John in Foreign Policy of Peru states, "Although persuasive evidence linking Peru to either the ten-centavo tax or Bolivia's decision to confiscate Chilean holdings in Antofagasta never surfaced, it must be recognized that Peruvian interests had deep-seated economical and political reasons for going to war."

Tax and Chilean refusal

In 1875, the city of Antofagasta had attempted to impose a 3 cents tax on the CSFA, but the Bolivian State Council (Consejo de Estado), headed by Serapio Reyes Ortiz, who would be Minister of Foreign Affairs during the crisis, rejected the tax because it violated the license of 1873 and the Boundary Treaty of 1874.

On 14 February 1878, the National Congress of Bolivia and the National Constituent Assembly approved the 1873 license if the company paid a 10 cents per quintal tax, but the company objected by citing the 1874 treaty that the increased payments were illegal and demanded an intervention from the Chilean government.

The CSFA's directory board perceived the tax as a Peruvian move to displace Chileans from the nitrate production, as had occurred in Tarapacá in 1875 when the Peruvian government expropriated the salitreras.

Having surrendered its claim to the disputed territories in return for a Bolivian promise to avoid increasing the tax, Chile claimed that the treaty did not allow for such a tax hike. Bolivia suspended the tax in April 1878. In November, Chile proposed mediation and cautioned that Daza's refusal to cancel the tax would force Chile to declare null the 1874 treaty. In December 1878, Bolivia, counting on its military alliance with Peru, challenged Chile, stated the tax was unrelated to the treaty and that the claim of the CSFA should be addressed in Bolivian courts, and revived the tax. When the company refused to pay the tax, Bolivia confiscated its property on 11 February and threatened to sell it on 14 February to liquidate the company's debt.

=== Chilean invasion of Antofagasta ===
In December 1878, Chile had dispatched a warship to the area. On 6 February, the Bolivian government nullified the CSFA's exploitation license and confiscated the property. The news reached Valparaíso on 11 February and so the Chilean government decided on the occupation of the region of Antofagasta south of 23° South. On the day of the planned auction, 200 Chilean soldiers arrived by ship at the port city of Antofagasta and seized it without resistance. The occupying forces received widespread support from the local population, 93–95% of which was Chilean.

The Bolivian territory between 23° South and the Loa River, the border with Peru, remained unoccupied by Chilean forces almost one month after the Bolivian declaration of war. On 21 March, Cobija and then Calama, Tocopilla, and other hamlets were occupied. The Chilean government asked the Bolivian office-holders to remain in office, but they refused.

=== Peruvian mediation and Bolivian declaration of war ===
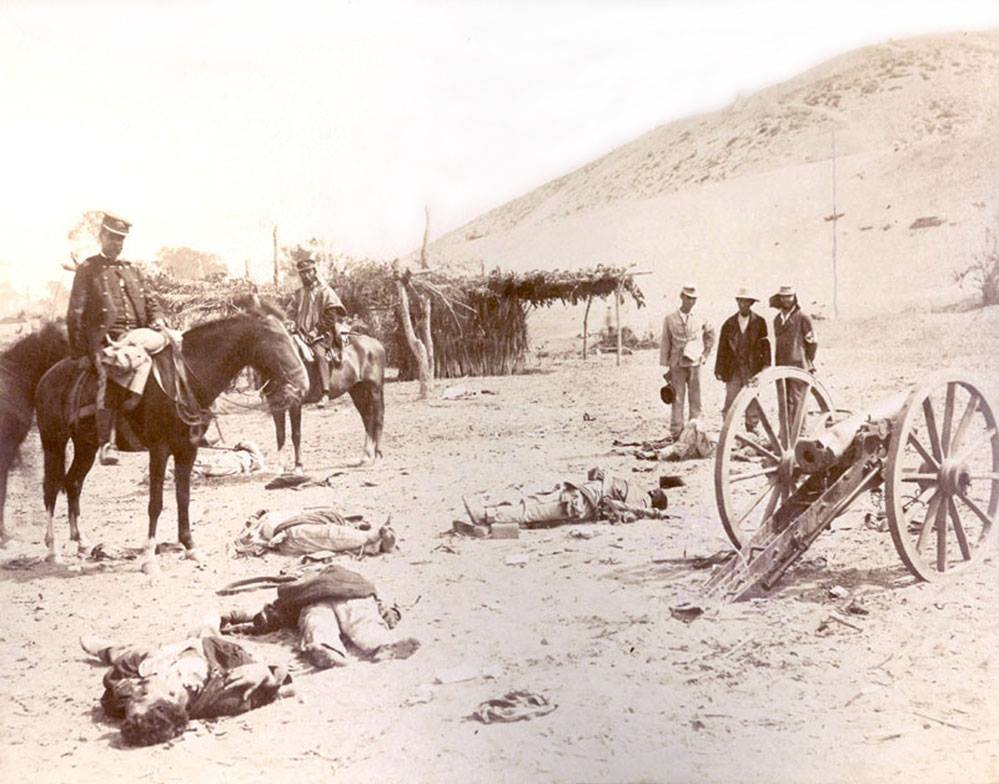
Martiniano Urriola, with kepi, the commander of the occupation of Ayacucho in 1883, and Marcos Maturana, with poncho, the general chief of staff chief of the Expeditionary Army during the Lima Campaign; they view the dead bodies of a Peruvian gun crew after the Battle of Chorrillos.

On 22 February, Peru sent a diplomatic team headed by José Antonio de Lavalle to Santiago to act as a mediator between the Chilean and the Bolivian governments. Peru meanwhile ordered its fleet and army to prepare for war. De Lavalle arrived in Valparaíso on 4 March. On 27 February, Daza had made a public manifesto to inform the Bolivians on the occupation of Antofagasta and to call for patriotic support. The same day, the Bolivian legislature authorized a formal declaration of war upon Chile although it was not immediately announced. On 1 March, Daza issued instead a decree to prohibit all commerce and communications with Chile "while the state-of-war provoked upon Bolivia lasts." It provided Chileans ten days to leave Bolivian territory unless they were gravely ill or handicapped and embargoed Chilean furniture, property, and mining produce; allowed Chilean mining companies to continue operating under a government-appointed administrator; and provided all embargoes as temporary "unless the hostilities exercised by Chilean forces requires an energetic retaliation from Bolivia."

In Santiago, Lavalle asked for Chile's withdrawal from Antofagasta to transfer the province to a tripartite administration of Bolivia, Chile, and Peru without Bolivia guaranteeing to end the embargo or to cancel the new tax.

On 14 March, in a meeting with foreign powers in Lima, Bolivia announced that a state of war existed with Chile. The declaration was aimed to impede further Chilean arms purchases in Europe and to scuttle the Peruvian mediation in Chile. Bolivia called on Peru to activate the treaty of alliance arguing that Chile's invasion was a casus foederis.

Also on 14 March, Alejandro Fierro, Chile's minister of foreign affairs, sent a telegram to Chile's representative in Lima, Joaquin Godoy, to request the immediate neutrality of the Peruvian government. On March 17, Godoy formally presented the Chilean proposal in a meeting with Peruvian President Prado.

On 21 March, Godoy telegraphed the Chilean government on the secret treaty between Peru and Bolivia, which had been revealed to him by Peruvian President Prado.

On 23 March, on their way to occupy Calama, 554 Chilean troops and cavalry defeated 135 Bolivian soldiers and civilians, who were dug in at two destroyed bridges next to the Topáter ford. The Battle of Topáter was the first battle of the war.

When the Chilean government asked Lavalle directly and officially whether a defensive alliance existed that committed Peru to assist Bolivia in a war with Chile and whether Lima planned to honor the agreement, Lavalle could prevaricate no longer and answered yes to both. Chilean President Pinto sought and received legislative approval to declare war, which he did on 5 April 1879. Peru responded on 6 April, when Prado declared the casus foederis.

== War ==
=== Forces ===
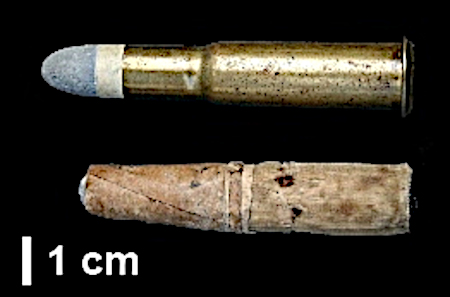
A metallic brass cartridge for a Fusil Gras mle 1874 and a paper cartridge for a Chassepot rifle. The brass cartridge avoided the smoke and ashes of the self-consuming paper cartridge.

Historians agree that the belligerents were not prepared for the war financially or militarily. None of the three nations had a General Staff, medical corps, or military logistics and their warships were in a deplorable state. In Chile, for example, the military contingent had been reduced continuously from 3,776 (by 1867) to 2,400 (by 1879) men, and no military unit was deployed north of Valparaíso, 1700 km south of Iquique. By the end of the war, 53% of chief engineers serving in Chilean warships were foreigners. The government of Peru was again in default of payment, and in Bolivia, famine spread over the country.

According to William Sater, Chile and Peru enlisted temporarily 2% of the male population but Bolivia only 1%. After the Battle of Tacna, both of the Allied armies were disbanded and had to be formed again.

Army forces
Chile	Perú	Bolivia
January 1879, before the war
2,440 (Note: Sater 2007, p. 58 Table 3)	5,557 (Note: Sater 2007, p. 45 Table 1)	1,687 (Note: Sater 2007, p. 51 Table 2)
January 1881, before occupation of Lima
ante Lima: 27,000 (Note: Sater 2007, p. 263)	Army of Lima: 25–35,000 (Note: Sater 2007, p. 274)	In Bolivia:
Tarapacá & Antofagasta: 8,000	In Arequipa: 13,000	
In Chile: 6,000	Army of the North: (Added to Lima)	
Other authors give other figures, see Valentina Verbal Stockmayer, p. 153

The Allied forces, at first glance, had some advantages over the Chilean forces. Their population and armies doubled the Chileans in numbers, and the Peruvian port of Callao's powerful artillery was impregnable for the Chilean navy and a secure haven for the Peruvian navy. In Callao, an English company offered the service of a floating dock for ships up to 3000 tonnes, and the Peruvian government used it to repair their ships at the outset of the war. Those are some reasons that led the international press to expect a Chilean defeat as the war started. Moreover, the ambivalent Argentine position and the ongoing Mapuche conflict overshadowed the Chilean perspective. Jorge Basadre commented on the public opinion in Peru and Bolivia: "They ignored the real power of Chile and the horrors of war, and simple minded people believed that the allies would win the war because they together were bigger than Chile."

Artillery
Model	Number	Caliber mm	Weight kg	Distance m	Projectile kg
Chile
Krupp Mountain Gun M1873 L/21	12–16	60	107	2500	2.14
Krupp Field Gun M1867 L/25	?	78.5	?	3000	4.3
Krupp Mountain Gun M1879 L/13	38	75	100	3000	4.5
Krupp Mountain Gun M1879-80 L/24	24	87	305	4600	1.5
Krupp Field Gun M1880 L/27	29	75	100	4800	4.3
Krupp Field Gun M1873 L/24	12	88	450	4800	6.8
Armstrong Bronze M1880	6	66	250	4500	4.1
Model 59 Emperador	12	87	?	323	11.5
La Hitte Field Gun M1858	4	84	?	342	4.035
La Hitte Mountain Gun M1858	8	86.5	?	225	4.035
Perú
White Gun (Mountain) (Note: White and Grieve guns were developed and produced in Peru during the war)	31	55	?	2500	2.09
White Gun (Field)	49	55	?	3800	2.09
Grieve Steel	42	60	107	2500	2.14
Bolivia
Krupp Mountain Gun M1872 L/21	6	60	107	2500	2.14

However, other observers made a more in-depth analysis, which showed Chilean political and military advantages. Chile had a stable political system since 1833 that had developed and strengthened its institutions. The Chilean army and the navy had educated officers, soldiers with professional experience in the Mapuche conflict, and uniformly modern arms. Almost all Chilean soldiers were armed with Comblain or Gras rifles. The Chilean navy also possessed two new ironclads, which were invincible against the older Peruvian warships. Although there was interference between military and government over policy during the war, the primacy of the government was never questioned. The Chilean supply line from Europe through the Magellan Strait was only once threatened unsuccessfully by the Peruvian navy.

The Allied armies were heavily involved in domestic politics and neglected their military duties, and poor planning and administration caused them to buy different rifles with different calibers. That hampered the instruction of conscripts, the maintenance of arms, and the supply of ammunition. The Peruvian navy warships manned before the war by Chilean sailors had to be replaced by foreign crews when the war began. Bolivia had no navy. The Allied armies had nothing comparable to the Chilean cavalry and artillery.

=== Struggle for sea control ===
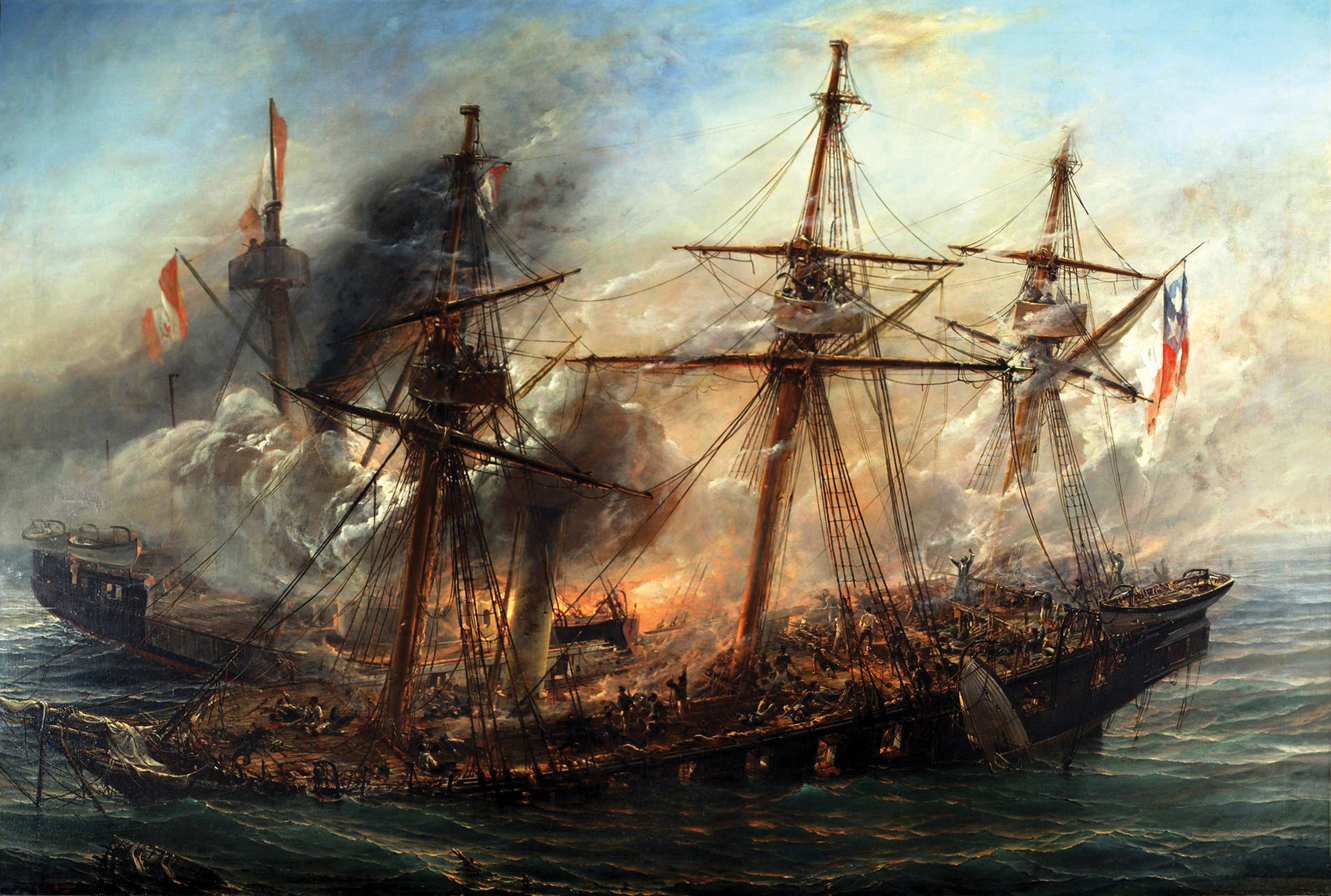
Battle of Iquique

Its few roads and railroad lines made the nearly waterless and largely unpopulated Atacama Desert difficult to occupy. From the beginning, naval superiority was critical. Bolivia had no navy and so on 26 March 1879, Hilarión Daza formally offered letters of marque to any ships willing to fight for Bolivia. The Armada de Chile and the Marina de Guerra del Perú fought the naval battles.

Early on, Chile blockaded the Peruvian port of Iquique on 5 April. In the Battle of Iquique, on 21 May 1879, the Peruvian ironclad Huáscar engaged and sank the wooden Esmeralda. Meanwhile, during the Battle of Punta Gruesa, the Peruvian ironclad Independencia struck a submerged rock and sank in the shallow waters near Punta Gruesa while chasing the schooner Covadonga. Peru broke the blockade of Iquique, and Chile lost the old Esmeralda, but the loss of the Independencia cost Peru 40% of its naval offensive power. It also made a strong impression upon military leaders in Argentina, and the possibility of Argentina's intervention in the war became far more remote.

Despite being outnumbered, the Peruvian monitor Huáscar held off the Chilean Navy for six months and upheld Peru's morale during the early stages of the conflict.

The capture of the steamship Rímac on 23 July 1879, carrying a cavalry regiment (the Carabineros de Yungay) was the Chilean Army's largest loss until then. That led to the resignation of Contraalmirante (Rear Admiral) Juan Williams Rebolledo, the chief of the Chilean Navy, on 17 August. Commodore Galvarino Riveros Cárdenas replaced him and devised a plan to catch the Huáscar.

Meanwhile, the Peruvian navy pursued other actions, particularly in August 1879 when the Unión unsuccessfully raided Punta Arenas, near the Strait of Magellan, in an attempt to capture the British merchant ship Gleneg, which was transporting weapons and supplies to Chile.

Capital ships of Chile and Peru at the beginning of the War of the Pacific
Warship	tons (L.ton)	Horse- power	Speed (Knots)	Armor (Inch)	Main Artillery	Built Year
Chile
Cochrane	3,560	3,000	9–12.8	up to 9	6x9 Inch	1874
Blanco Encalada	3,560	3,000	9–12.8	up to 9	6x9 Inch	1874
Peru
Huascar	1,130	1,200	10–11	4½	2x300–pounders	1865
Independencia	2,004	1,500	12–13	4½	2x150–pounders	1865

The Battle of Angamos proved decisive on 8 October 1879, and Peru was reduced almost exclusively to land forces. In the battle, the Chilean Navy captured the Huáscar after several hours of fierce fighting, even though her surviving crewmen sought to scuttle her. The Chilean Navy was thereafter free to carry troops for the invasion of Peru and to provide fire support for amphibious assault and other troops operating in the conflict areas. Chilean warships also had to impose a naval blockade of Peruvian ports and end the smuggling of arms from Panama into Peru via the Pacific.

After the battle, despite the loss of both of Peru's main ships, the Peruvians used simple and ingenious ruses to sink two important Chilean ships, the Loa (July 1880) and the Covadonga (August 1880), but its remaining vessels were locked in Callao during its long blockade by the Chileans.

On the other hand, the Chilean Navy captured the ship Pilcomayo in November 1879 and the torpedo boat Alay in December 1880.

When Lima fell after the Battles of San Juan and Miraflores, the Peruvian naval officers scuttled their remaining fleet to prevent its capture by the Chilean forces.

During the Sierra campaign, Chilean ships were dedicated to guarding the Peruvian coast and transporting military detachments and war material for land operations.

In November 1883, during the final phase of the war, the Chilean military command sent the Chilean torpedo boat Colo Colo to Lake Titicaca, via railroad, from Mollendo to Puno to control the lake. The presence of the torpedo boat prevented communications through this route and its use for military purposes, and the Peruvian vessels that had taken refuge in the vicinity surrendered to the Chileans. The deployment of the torpedo boat also induced the Bolivian government to agree to a peace treaty with Chile in 1884.

=== Land war ===
The evolution of the land war in the War of the Pacific.

After the Battle of Angamos, once Chile achieved naval supremacy, the government had to decide where to strike. The options were Tarapacá, Moquegua or directly Lima. Because of its proximity to Chile and the capture of the Peruvian Salitreras, Chile decided to occupy the Peruvian province of Tarapacá first.

Arica and Iquique were isolated and separated by the Atacama Desert; since the capture of the Huáscar in October 1879, neither port had naval protection needed to be adequately supplied by sea. Without any communication or withdrawal lines, the area was essentially cut off from the rest of Peru. After the loss of its naval capabilities, Peru had the option to withdraw to central Peru to strengthen its army around Lima until the re-establishment of a naval balance or to build up new alliances, as hinted by the Chilean historian Wilhelm Ekdahl. However, Jorge Basadre assumes that it would have been "striking and humiliating" to abandon Tarapacá, the source of Peru's wealth.

On 30 April 1879, after 13 days of marching, 4,500 Bolivian soldiers, commanded by Daza, arrived in Tacna, a town 100 km (60 mi) north of Arica. The Bolivians had come to join the Peruvian forces, commanded by Juan Buendia. The Allied forces were deployed to the places that a Chilean landing could be expected; the Iquique-Pisagua or Arica-Tacna regions. There were reserves stationed at Arequipa, farther north in Peru, under Lizardo Montero, as well as in southern Bolivia, under Narciso Campero (Note: The Bolivian 5th Division started on 11 October 1879 from Cotagaita bound for Antofagasta and was reordered to Iquique, next to Tacna, then to repress any rebellion against Daza in South Bolivia, and finally arrived at Oruro 19 Januar 1880. It never entered the Bolivian Litoral but later fought in the Battle of Tacna. Querejazu states that its wandering in Potosi and Oruro showed that Daza had been bribed by Chile. See also commons:File:Ruta 5. division de Camacho, en 1879-80.svg.) The reserves were to be deployed to the coast after a landing but failed to arrive.

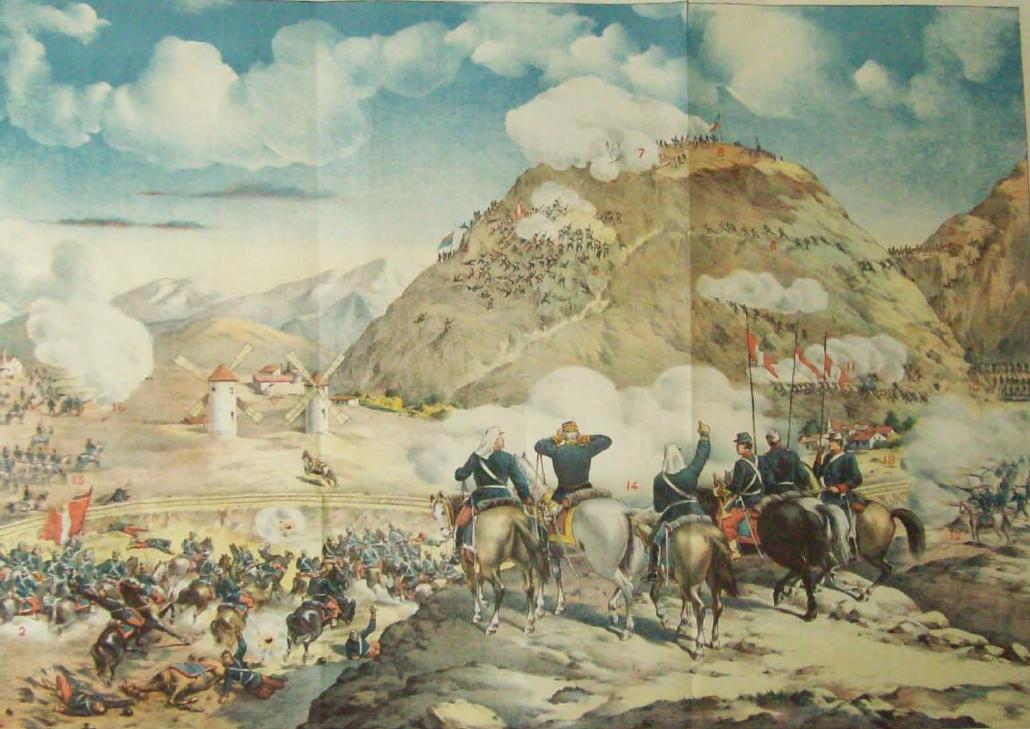
Battle of San Francisco

The land war can be seen as four Chilean military campaigns that successively occupied Tarapacá, Arica-Tacna, and Lima and a final campaign that ended the Peruvian resistance in the sierra. The occupation of Arequipa and Puno at the end of the war saw little military action.

==== Tarapacá Campaign ====
Landing and deployment of Chilean and Allied troops during the Campaign of Tarapacá, in November 1879.

The Campaign of Tarapacá began on November 2, 1879, when nine steam transporters escorted by half of the Chilean Navy transported 9,500 men and more than 850 animals to Pisagua, some 500 kilometres (310 mi) north of Antofagasta. After neutralizing the coastal batteries, the Chileans landed and attacked beach defenses in Pisagua.

In the event of a Chilean landing, the Allied forces planned to counterattack the Chilean forces in a pincer movement involving advances from the north (Daza's forces coming from Arica) and from the south (Buendia's forces coming from Iquique). Although Peruvian forces marched northwards as planned after the fall of Pisagua, Daza, coming from Arica, decided in Camarones (44 km from Pisagua) to give up his part of the counterattack and return to Arica.

The Chileans meanwhile marched towards Iquique and, on 19 November 1879, defeated the Allied troops without Daza's men gathered in Agua Santa in the Battle of San Francisco and Dolores. Disbanded Bolivian forces there and the southern force retreated to Oruro, and the Peruvians fell back to Tiliviche. The Chilean army captured Iquique (80 km/50 mi south of Pisagua) without resistance. Some of the Peruvian forces that had been defeated at San Francisco retreated on Tarapacá, a little town with same name as the province, where they combined with Peruvian troops who withdrew to Tarapacá directly from Iquique.

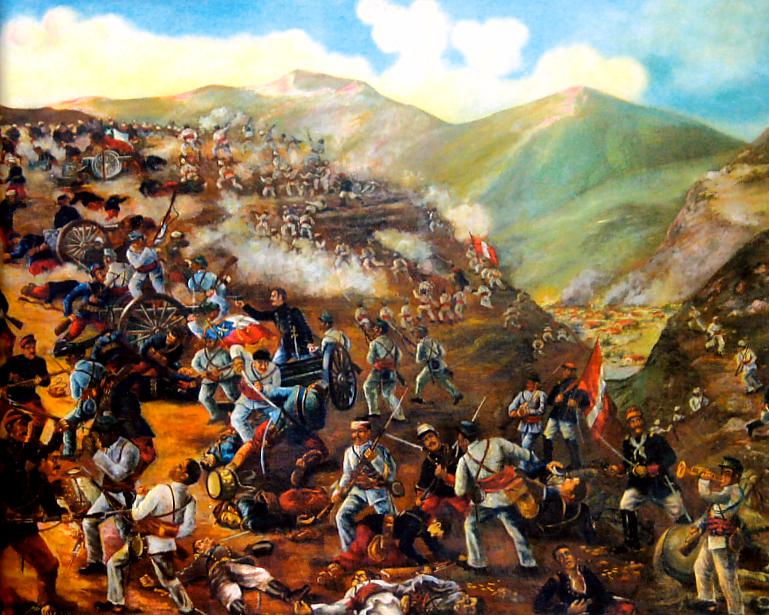
Battle of Tarapacá

A detachment of Chilean soldiers, with cavalry and artillery, was sent to face the Peruvian forces in Tarapacá. Both sides clashed on 27 November in the Battle of Tarapacá, and the Chilean forces were defeated, but the Peruvian forces, without lines of communication with their supply bases in Peru or Bolivia, could not maintain their occupation of the territory. Consequently, the Peruvians retreated north through harsh desert terrain to Arica and lost many troops during their withdrawal. Bruce W. Farcau comments that, "The province of Tarapacá was lost along with a population of 200,000, nearly one tenth of the Peruvian total, and an annual gross income of £28 million in nitrate production, virtually all of the country's export earnings." The victory afforded Santiago an economic boon and a potential diplomatic asset.

==== Domestic policies until the fall of Iquique ====
The Rimac’s capture, the sinking of the Esmeralda, and the passiveness of the Chilean fleet showed that the command of the navy was unprepared for the war, and the army also had trouble with the logistics, medical service, and command. Public discontent with poor decisions led to riots, and the government had to replace the "sclerotics" chief of the navy Juan Williams Rebolledo (by Galvarino Riveros), and the Chief of the army Justo Arteaga (by Erasmo Escala). After Tarapacá, the army was reorganized into divisions. Chile's foreign policy tried to separate Bolivia from Peru. Gonzalo Bulnes writes: "The target of the política boliviana was the same as before, to seize Tacna and Arica for Bolivia and put Bolivia as a buffer state between Peru and Chile, on the assumption that Peru would accept the Chilean peace conditions. The initiated called such policy 'to clear up Bolivia.'" Moreover, the Chilean government had to find a border agreement with Argentina to avoid war.

After the occupation of the salpeter and guano deposits, the Chilean government restituted the oficinas salitreras, which had been nationalized by Peru, to the owner of the certificate of debt. The alternative of a Chilean State Company of Salpeter was discarded as too onerous for a government waging war and lacking experienced personnel, and the creditors pressed the issue. In 1879, Chile began to exact a tax of 40 cents per "quintal métrico" (100 kg), increasing to $1.60 in 1880.

As provided by the secret treaty, the allies agreed in the Protocol of Subsidies for Bolivia to bear the costs of the war. The agreement, which regulated the tax income for many years, caused resentments and fears in Bolivia, whose deployment of forces to Tacna was seen as helping Peru. Also, Bolivia knew that its army would be sent not to free the occupied region of Bolivia but to protect Peru. As Daza and his officers came to Tacna and Arica, they failed to see the expected Peruvian military strength and understood that their position of power in Bolivia was threatened by a defeat of the Allies. The Bolivian historian Querejazu suggests that Daza successfully used the Chilean offer of Tacna and Arica for Bolivia to exert pressure on Peru to get a more favorable Protocol of Subsidies.

The reason that Daza abandoned the Peruvian forces in Iquique and turned back to Arica just before the Battle of San Francisco is uncertain. Some historians say that he wanted to keep the "Regimiento Colorados" untouched since the force secured his political power in Bolivia. Daza later stated that his officers refused to continue the march through the desert, but his shameful withdrawal accelerated his downfall, and he was succeeded by Narciso Campero. In the new government, there was a strong tendency to accept the Chilean offer of Tacna and Arica, but it was eventually refused. Bolivia signed the creation of the United States of Peru and Bolivia, a political fantasy without any practical consequences. Bolivia helped Peru with money and weapons, but the Bolivian army never again intervened in the war.

In Peru, the political situation was complicated. President Prado had declared war on Chile for longstanding economical and political reasons but without the funds or international credit to finance the war. He turned over the administration of the state to Vice President Luis La Puerta de Mendoza to assume for himself the command of the army. Because of the Chilean blockade, Peru could not export revenue making goods via its ports. As a consequence, public revenue was half of what had been expected, and spending tripled. The Peruvian government in 1879 experienced several political crises and seven ministers of finance. General Buendía, who led the defeated allied troops in Iquique, and More, chief of the sunken warship Independence, were both put on trial but were eventually acquitted.

The Peruvian government was confronted with widespread rioting in Lima because of its failures. On 18 December 1879, as the fall of Iquique became known in Peru, Prado went from Callao to Panama, allegedly with the duty to oversee the purchase of new arms and warships for the nation. In a statement for the Peruvian newspaper El Comercio, he turned over the command of the country to Vice President Luis La Puerta de Mendoza. History has condemned his departure as a desertion. Nicolás de Piérola overthrew Puerta's government and took power on 23 December 1879.

Piérola has been criticised because of his sectarianism, frivolous investment, bombastic decrees, and lack of control in the budget, but it must be said that he put forth an enormous effort to obtain new funds and to mobilize the country for the war. Basadre considered his work an act of heroism, abnegation in a country invaded, politically divided, militarily battered, and economically bloodless.

==== Campaign of Tacna and Arica ====
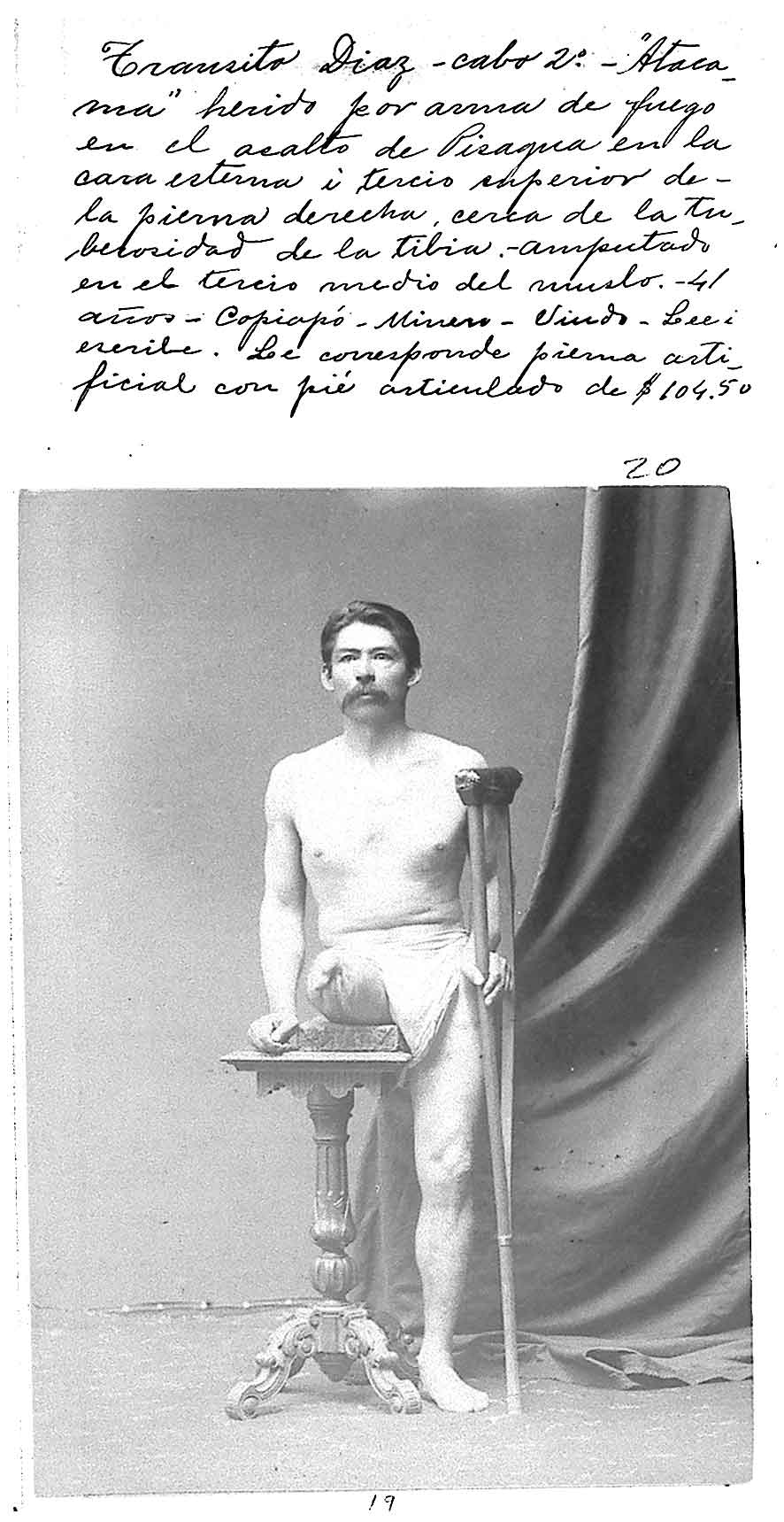
Photo of Chilean private first class Tránsito Diaz, injured during the landing on Pisagua. The photo belongs to the "Álbum de inválidos de la Guerra del Pacífico", 130 photographic records ordered by the D. Santa María government to demonstrate the pensions and orthopedic devices given to disabled war veterans. Ten percent of the expeditionary force, 4,081 Chilean soldiers, returned disabled from the war. In 2008, 280 women were receiving a pension as the daughter or wife of a veteran.

Landing and deployment of Chilean and Allied troops during the Campaign of Tacna and Arica from January to June 1880.

Meanwhile, Chile continued its advances in the Tacna and Arica Campaign. On 28 November, ten days after the Battle of San Francisco, Chile declared the formal blockade of Arica. On 31 December, a Chilean force of 600 men carried out an amphibious raid at Ilo as a reconnaissance in force, to the north of Tacna and withdrew the same day.

===== Lynch's Expedition =====
On 24 February 1880, approximately 11,000 men in 19 ships, protected by Blanco Encalada, Toro, and Magallanes and two torpedo boats, sailed from Pisagua. Two days later, on 26 February, the Chileans arrived off Punta Coles, near Pacocha, Ilo. The landing took several days to conclude but faced no resistance. The Peruvian commander, Lizardo Montero, refused to try to drive the Chileans from the beachhead, as the Chileans had expected. On 22 March, 3,642 Chilean troops defeated 1,300 Peruvian troops in the Battle of Los Ángeles, cutting any direct Peruvian supply from Lima to Arica or Tacna (supply was possible only through the long way, via Bolivia). After the Battle of Los Ángeles, only three allied positions remained in southern Peru: General Leyva's 2nd Army at Arequipa (including some survivors from Los Ángeles), Bolognesi's 7th and 8th Divisions at Arica, and at Tacna the 1st Army. These forces were under Campero's direct command. However, the numbers proved meaningless, as the Peruvians were unable to concentrate troops or even to move from their garrisons. After crossing 40 miles (64 km) of desert, on 26 May the Chilean army (14,147 men) destroyed the allied army of 5,150 Bolivians and 8,500 Peruvians in the Battle of Tacna. The need for a port near the army to supply and reinforce the troops and to evacuate the wounded compelled the Chilean command to concentrate on the remaining Peruvian stronghold of Arica. On 7 June, after the Battle of Arica, the last Peruvian bastion in the Tacna Department fell. After the campaign of Tacna and Arica, the Peruvian and Bolivian regular armies largely ceased to exist, and Bolivia effectively left the war.

===== Lackawanna Conference =====
On 22 October 1880, delegates of Peru, Chile, and Bolivia held a 5-day conference aboard the USS Lackawanna in Arica. The meeting had been arranged by the United States Ministers Plenipotentiary in the belligerent countries. The Lackawanna Conference, also called the Arica Conference, attempted to develop a peace settlement.

Chile demanded Peruvian Tarapacá Province and the Bolivian Atacama, an indemnity of 20,000,000 gold pesos, the restoration of property taken from Chilean citizens, the return of the Rimac, the abrogation of the treaty between Peru and Bolivia, and a formal commitment not to mount artillery batteries in Arica's harbor. Arica, as a settlement, was to be limited to commercial use. Chile planned to retain the territories of Moquegua, Tacna, and Arica until all peace treaty conditions were satisfied. Although willing to accept the negotiated settlement, Peru and Bolivia insisted for Chile to withdraw its forces from all occupied lands as a precondition for discussing peace. Having captured the territory at great expense, Chile declined, and the negotiations failed. Bruce St. John states in Foreign Policy of Peru (p. 116), "Peru attended only out of deference to the [US government] latter, hoping a failure of the talks might lead to more aggressive US involvement."

==== Campaign of Lima ====
Landing and deployment of Chilean troops during the Campaign of Lima, from November 1880 to January 1881. The long way from Pisco to Chilca was done only by the Lynch brigade.

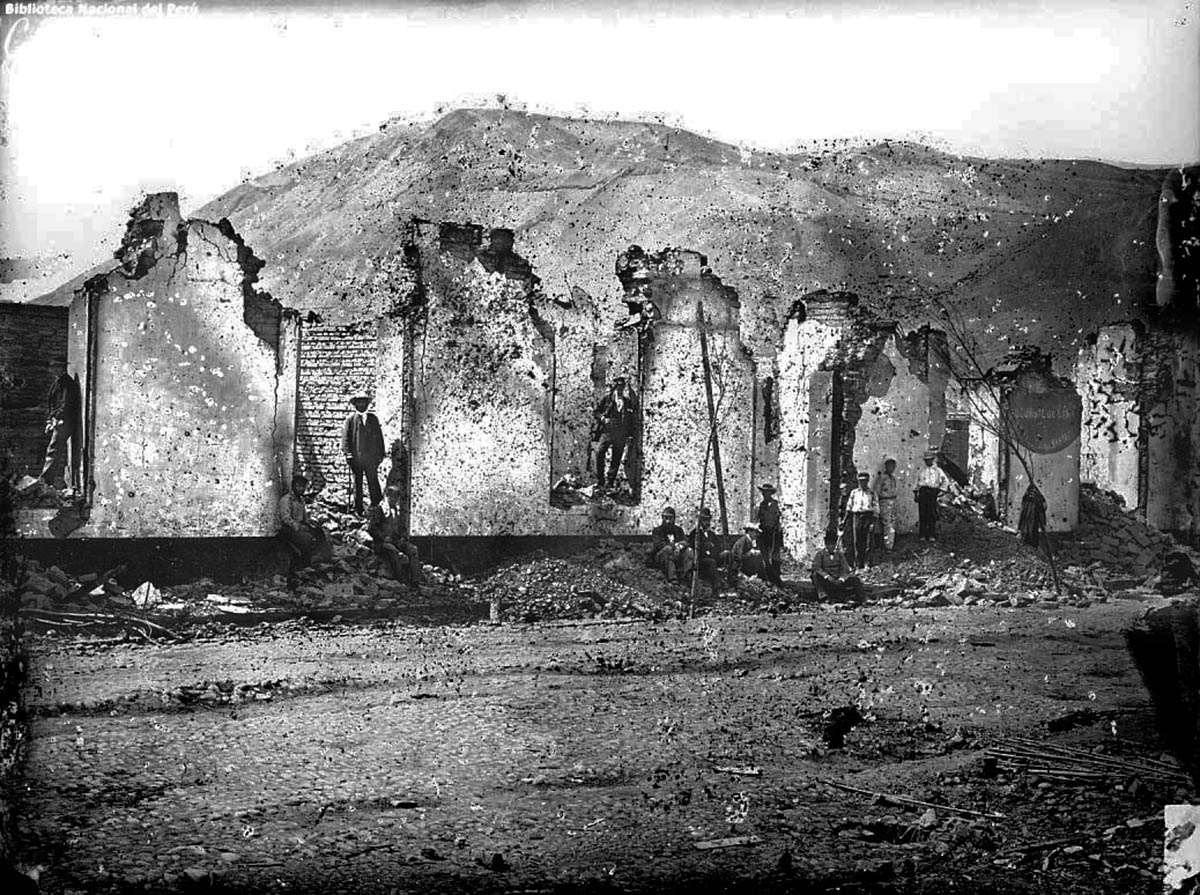
Chorrillos was the preferred seaside resort of Lima's aristocracy before the war, but during the Battle of Chorrillos, the Peruvian line of defense ran in the middle of the city and was shelled, set on fire, looted, and reduced to rubble during the conflict. At the end of the battle, bitter fighting had raged in every ruin and street.

The occupation of the southern departments of Peru (Tacna, Arica, and Tarapacá) and the Lynch expedition showed that the army of Peru no longer possessed the skilled military manpower to defend the country. However, nothing could convince the Peruvian government to sue for peace. The defeated allies failed to realize their situation and, despite the empty Bolivian treasury, on 16 June 1880, the Bolivian National Assembly voted to continue the war. On 11 June 1880, a document was signed in Peru declaring the creation of the United States of Peru-Bolivia, but Piérola continued the struggle. W. Sater states, "Had Piérola sued for peace in June 1880, he would have saved countless Peruvian lives and the nation's treasure."

The Chilean government struggled to satisfy the public demands to end the war and to secure the peace. The situation forced the Chilean government to plan the occupation of Lima.

Landings on Pisco, Chilca, Curayaco, and Lurín

Once the size of the Chilean army had been increased by 20,000 men to reach a strength of 41,000 soldiers, deployed from the forts of the Chile–Mapuche frontier to the outskirts of Lima, the Chilean army began the campaign of Lima. Lacking the ships to transport all the troops at once from Arica, the Chileans decided to land a division and then the rest of the army in stages. Their shortage of shipping also precluded an immediate landing at Lima. Instead, Pisco, approximately 320 kilometres (200 mi) south of Lima, was the first landing point.

On 19 November, 8,800 men, twenty cannons and their supplies reached Pisco. A party of 400 men was landed near the port and they learned that a garrison of 3,000 men defended Pisco. Bypassing it required a landing to be made directly into the port and so a Chilean vanguard was landed in Paracas, ten miles to the south. The force managed to capture Pisco and on 20 November the rest of the Chilean troops landed, later occupying various other nearby coastal cities, securing for the Chileans de facto control of the Peruvian province of Ica.

On 2 December, 3,500 additional men and 416 horses disembarked in Pisco. Some two weeks later, on 15 December, 14,000 Chilean men, 2,400 horses and mules, and supplies left Arica for the north. Baquedano, the Chilean commander, decided that only one brigade in the Pisco region, Lynch's brigade, would march the 55 miles (89 km) north to the coastal town of Chilca, a town only 45 kilometres (28 mi) from Lima. All other Chilean forces would be re-embarked in Pisco for naval transport to Chilca. The Chilean troops disembarked in Curayaco, slightly north of Chilca, on 22 December 1880. The artillery was later disembarked at Lurín, on the southern outskirts of Lima, as the Chilean army was able to advance quickly after landing.

Piérola, who had expected a landing north of Lima, ordered the construction of two parallel lines of Peruvian defences, one at Chorrillos and one at Miraflores. It was hoped that the Peruvian professional Army would defeat the Chileans in Chorrillos. If that measure failed, a reserve army, increased with remnants of Chorrillos and the Callao troops, were expected to hold the Chilean advance at Miraflores. The Peruvian forces numbered approximately 25,000 to 32,000 men and were titled the Army of Lima.

The main Peruvian defense line ran from the seaside resort of Chorrillos through Morro Solar, Santa Teresa, San Juan, the Pamplona (hills) until Monterrico Chico, a line of defence approximately 15 km long. Gatling guns, artillery, covering forts and trenches located along the top of the steeply natural hills (280 m in Morro Solar, 170 m in Sta. Teresa and San Juan) and minefields around the roads to Lima crossing the hamlets of San Juan and Santa Teresa, settlements that the Peruvians anticipated would be important targets of the Chilean attack, all of which were used by the Peruvian military.

The second line of defense was less strong, consisting of 7 redoubts (one every 800 meters) for infantry and artillery, which the Peruvians hoped would stop any Chilean offensive.

The Chilean General Staff had two plans for the attack. Baquedano, the army chief, advocated a direct and frontal advance through the Tablada de Lurín. The area was known, with large areas of relatively flat terrain against the line of Chorrillos. The advantages of that path of advance were the shorter distances to be covered, a withdrawal line, the possibility of support from the Chilean navy, water supply from Lurín, and less need to train troops and the complex Chilean discipline to control any advance and subsequent attack. The alternative plan of War Minister José Francisco Vergara laid down a turning movement that would bypass the Peruvian line by attacking from further to the east: through the Lurín valley, moving via Chantay and reaching Lima at Ate. Using that approach meant that Lima could be seized without resistance or both defense lines could be attacked from the rear.

Vergara's plan avoided the bloody frontal attack, circumvented all defense works, cut any Peruvian withdrawal line to the east into the formidable Andes, and demoralized the Peruvians. However, there were no steady roads for movement of Chilean artillery and baggage, no water to allow navy support, and many bottlenecks in which a small force might stop the whole Chilean army on the way to Lima or if it had to withdraw. In addition, Vergara's plan required a well-trained and disciplined army. Baquedano pushed and eventually succeeded in having his plan adopted.

Battle of Chorrillos and Miraflores

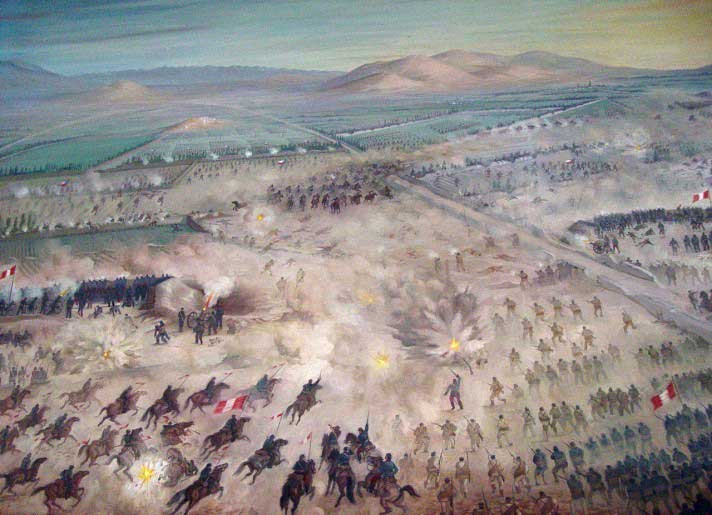
Battle of Miraflores

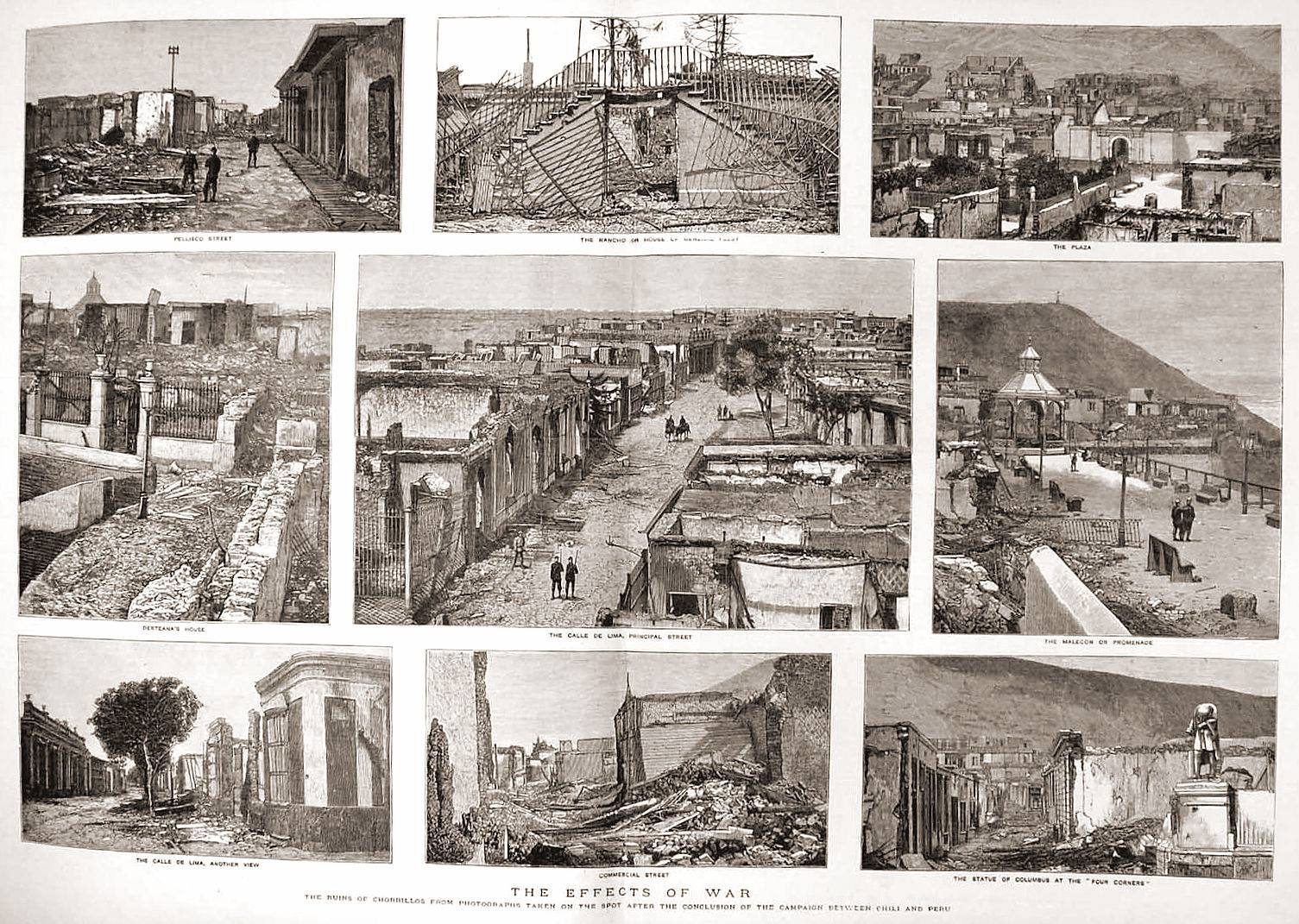
Chorrillos, and the consequences of the war. January 1881

In the afternoon of 12 January 1881, three Chilean formations (referred to as divisions) stepped off from Lurín toward Chorrillos at about 4:00, reaching their attack positions at around 3:00 the next morning. At 5:00 a.m. an assault was begun on the Peruvian forts. Lynch's division charged Iglesias's positions (Morro Solar to Santa Teresa), Sotomayor's men against Cáceres's sector (Santa Teresa to San Juan) and Lagos's division charged Davila's sector (San Juan to Monterrico Chico). Chilean and Peruvian soldiers locked in hand-to-hand combat and attacked one another with rifles, bayonets, rocks and even their bare hands. At the beginning, Sotomayor was unable to deploy in time, and Lynch's advance was repulsed. Baquedano was forced to throw in reserve brigades to salvage Lynch's flank. At 8:00 a.m., the Peruvian defenders were forced to withdraw from San Juan and Santa Teresa to Morro Solar and Chorrillos (town). At noon, Morro Solar was captured and the battle continued into Chorrillos, which fell at 14:00 (2 p.m.). During the Battle of Chorrillos, the Chileans inflicted a harsh defeat on the regular Peruvian forces, eliminating Lima's first defensive line. Two days later, the second line of defense was also penetrated in the Battle of Miraflores.

Piérola's division of forces in two lines has been criticised by Chilean analyst Francisco Machuca. Whether such criticism is justified is debatable. According to Gonzalo Bulnes the battles of Chorrillos and Miraflores have been some of the largest in South America regarding the number of combatants, 45,000 in Chorrillos and 25,000 in Miraflores. The estimated death toll was 11,000 to 14,000 personnel, with a further 10,144 injured.

==== Domestic policies until the fall of Lima ====
On 15 June 1881 Domingo Santa María was elected president of Chile and assumed office on 18 September 1881. A new Congress was elected on schedule in 1882.

Argentina had declared itself neutral at the onset of the war but allowed the transport of weapons to the Allies over Argentine territories, exerted influence on the US and European powers to stop the Chilean advance in the war, and pleaded for monetary indemnification instead of cession of territories to Chile. There was a strong drift in its public opinion in favor of Peru and Bolivia. Moreover, there were Peruvian and Bolivian hopes that Argentina could change its stance and enter a war against Chile.

On 23 July 1881, a few months after the fall of Lima, Chile and Argentina signed the Boundary Treaty, which ceded eastern Patagonia to Argentina and control over the Strait of Magellan to Chile.

Carlos Escudé and Andrés Cisneros state that the treaty was a true victory for Argentina, but Michael Morris believes, "Rearguard Argentine efforts had been made to gain recognition for some kind of shared management regime for the Strait [of Magellan], in order to mitigate what was perceived as the striking diplomatic defeat for Argentina in the 1881 treaty granting Chile control over the strait."

The situation in Bolivia stayed the same after the fall of Lima. The Bolivian government lacked the money, men, weapons, and means to transport an army to Peru.

==== War in the Peruvian Sierra ====
After the confrontations in Chorrillos and Miraflores, the Peruvian dictator Piérola refused to negotiate with the Chileans and escaped to the central Andes to try governing from the rear but soon lost the representation of the Peruvian state. (He left Peru in December 1881.)

The occupation commanders, Manuel Baquedano, Pedro Lagos, and then Patricio Lynch, had their respective military headquarters in the Government Palace, Lima. The new Chilean administration continued to push for an end to the costly war, but contrary to expectations, neither Lima's capture nor the imposition of heavy taxes led Peru to sue for peace. Conversely, Peruvian caudillos advocated to wage a defensive war of attrition that consumed Chile's power so much that it renounced their demand for the territory.

On 22 February 1881, the Piérola Congress, allowed by Chile, reinstated the 1860 constitution and chose Francisco García Calderón as the provisional president but he was assisted by the US minister in Lima in refusing the cession of territories to Chile. He was overthrown by the Chileans in September 1881, but before his relegation to Chile, he had appointed Lizardo Montero Flores as successor.

The Peruvian caudillos organized a resistance, which would be known as the Campaign of the Breña or Sierra, a widespread, prolonged, brutal, and eventually futile guerrilla campaign. They harassed the Chilean troops and their logistics to such a point that Lynch had to send expeditions to the valleys in the Andes.

The resistance was organised by Andrés Avelino Cáceres in the regions Cajamarca (north), Arequipa (south) and the Sierra Central (Cerro Pasco to Ayacucho) However, the collapse of national order in Peru brought on also domestic chaos and violence, most of which was motivated by class or racial divisions. Chinese and black laborers took the opportunity to assault haciendas and the property of the rich to protest their mistreatment suffered in previous years. Lima's masses attacked Chinese grocery stores, and Indian peasants took over highland haciendas. For the occupation forces, the region was an unknown, difficult terrain, force inhibitor, insalubrious (tunga penetrans, dysentery), inaccessible, and Chilean military supplies had to be transported from Lima or other points on the coast, purchased from locals, or confiscated, each option being either very expensive or politically hazardous.

An additional problem for the Chileans was collecting information in support of their expeditionary force. While Cáceres was informed about the dispositions and moves of his foes, Chileans often did not know the whereabouts of the guerrillas.

===== Letelier's expedition =====
In February 1881, Chilean forces, under Lieutenant Colonel Ambrosio Letelier started the first expedition into the Sierra, with 700 men, to defeat the last guerrilla bands from Huánuco (30 April) to Junín. After many losses, the expedition achieved very little and returned to Lima in early July, where Letelier and his officers were courts-martialed for diverting money into their own pockets.

===== 1882 Sierra Campaign =====
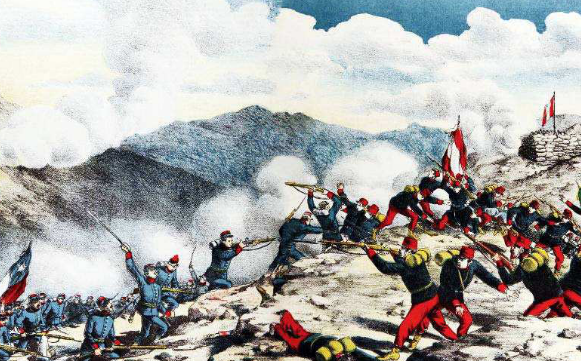
Sierra Campaign

To annihilate the guerrillas in the Mantaro Valley, in January 1882, Lynch ordered an offensive with 5,000 men under the command of Gana and Del Canto, first towards Tarma and then southeast towards Huancayo, reaching Izcuchaca. Lynch's army suffered enormous hardships including cold temperatures, snow and mountain sickness. On 9 July 1882, they fought the emblematic Battle of La Concepción. The Chileans had to pull back with a loss of 534 soldiers: 154 in combat, 277 of disease and 103 deserters.

García Calderón refused to relinquish Peruvian control over the Tarapacá Region and so was arrested. Before García Calderón left Peru for Chile, he named Admiral Lizardo Montero as his successor. At the same time, Piérola stepped back and supported Cáceres for the presidency. Cáceres refused to serve but supported Lizardo Montero. Montero moved to Arequipa and so García Calderón's arrest unified the forces of Piérola and Cáceres.

===== 1883 Sierra Campaign =====
Pursuits through Central Peru until Huamachuco.

Velasquez march to Arequipa and Puno in October 1883.

On 1 April 1882 Miguel Iglesias, Defence Minister under Piérola, became convinced that the war had to be brought to an end or Peru would be completely devastated. He issued a manifesto, es:Grito de Montán, calling for peace and in December 1882 convened a convention of representatives of the seven northern departments, where he was elected "Regenerating President" To support Iglesias against Montero, on 6 April 1883, Patricio Lynch started a new offensive to drive the guerrillas from central Peru and to destroy Cáceres's army. The Chilean troops pursued Cáceres northwest through narrow mountain passes until 10 July 1883, winning the definitive Battle of Huamachuco, the final Peruvian defeat.

=== Last days ===
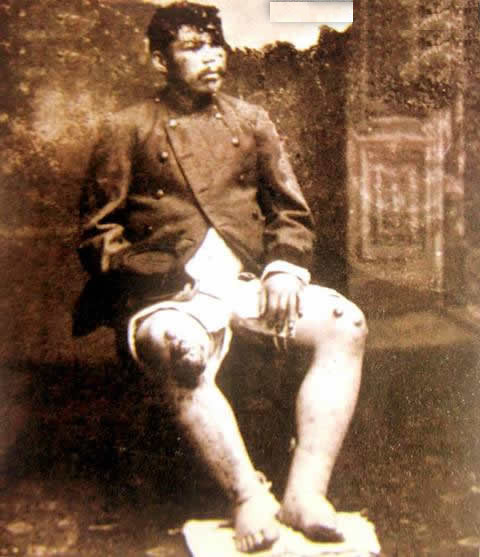
A Chilean soldier with the "Peruvian wart," or Carrion's disease, who was probably infected in the valleys of the Rimac River during the war in the sierra.

Chile and Iglesias's government signed the Peace Treaty of Ancón on 20 October 1883, which ended the war and ceded Tarapacá to Chile.

Lizardo Montero tried to resist in Arequipa with a force of 4,000 men, but when Chile's 3,000 fighters arrived from Mollendo, Moquegua, and Ayacucho and began the assault to Arequipa, the Peruvian troops mutinied against Montero and allowed the Chileans to occupy the city on 29 October 1883. Montero opted for a Bolivian asylum. The occupation of Ayacucho by Chilean Colonel Urriola on 1 October lasted only 40 days, as Urriola withdrew to Lima. Ayacucho was occupied by Cáceres's new army of 500 men. Cáceres continued to refuse the cession of territories to Chile.

The basis of Cáceres's war was the increasingly powerful Indian insurrection against the Chileans, which had changed the nature of the war. Indian guerrillas fought "white men from all parties," looted towns, and seized land of the white owners. In June 1884, Cáceres accepted Treaty of Ancón "as an accomplished fact" but continued to fight Iglesias.

On Cáceres's true reasons for his change of mind, Florencia Mallon wrote:

Yet long before the civil war was over, it became clear to the hero of la Breña that, in order to build an alliance that would carry him to the presidential palace, he had to mend fences with the "hacendados" as a class, included those who had collaborated with the Chileans. The only way to do so was to give the "hacendados" what they wanted and repress the very guerrillas who had made the Breña campaign possible in the first place.

On 29 October 1883, the Chilean occupation of Lima ended, and on 4 August 1884, Lynch and the rest of the Chilean Expeditionary Forces embarked in Callao for Chile.

== Peace ==
=== Peace treaty between Chile and Peru ===
On 20 October 1883, hostilities between Chile and Peru formally came to an end under the Treaty of Ancón, whose terms had Peru formally cede Tarapacá to Chile, and the use of the guano and nitrate resources to repay Peru's debts were regulated. Chile was also to occupy the provinces of Tacna and Arica for 10 years, when a plebiscite was to be held to determine nationality. For decades thereafter, the two countries failed to agree on the terms of the plebiscite. Finally, in 1929, mediation under US President Herbert Hoover caused the Treaty of Lima to be signed by which Chile kept Arica, and Peru reacquired Tacna.

=== Peace treaty between Bolivia and Chile ===
In 1884, Bolivia signed a truce, the Treaty of Valparaiso and accepted the military occupation of the entire Bolivian coast. The Treaty of Peace and Friendship (1904) ceded the complete region of Antofagasta to Chile. In return, Chile agreed to build the Arica–La Paz railway to connect the capital city of La Paz, Bolivia, with the port of Arica, and Chile guaranteed freedom of transit for Bolivian commerce through Chilean ports and territory.

== Military analysis ==
=== Comparison ===
As the war began, the Peruvian Army numbered 5,241 men of all ranks, organized in seven infantry battalions, three squadrons of cavalry and two regiments of artillery. The most common rifles in the army were the French Chassepot and the Minié rifles. The artillery, with a total of 28 pieces, was composed mostly of British-made Blakely cannons and counted four machine guns. Much of the artillery dated from 1866 and had been bought for the Chincha Islands War against Spain. The mounts used by the cavalry were small and inferior to those used by the Chileans.

The Bolivian Army numbered no more than 2,175 soldiers and was divided into three infantry regiments, two cavalry squadrons, and two sections of artillery. The Colorados Battalion, President Daza's personal guard, was armed with Remington Rolling Block rifles, but the remainder carried odds and ends including flintlock muskets. The artillery had rifled three pounders and four machine guns, and the cavalry rode mules given a shortage of good horses.

The regular Chilean Army was well equipped, with 2,694 soldiers. The regular infantry was armed with the modern Belgian Comblain rifle, of which Chile had a stock of some 13,000. Chile also had Gras, Minié, Remington and Beaumont rifles, most of which fired the same caliber cartridge (11 mm). The artillery had 75 artillery pieces, most of which were of Krupp and Limache manufacture, and six machine guns. The cavalry used French sabers and Spencer and Winchester carbines.

=== Strategy ===
Control of the sea was Chile's key to an inevitably difficult desert war: supply by sea, including water, food, ammunition, horses, fodder, and reinforcements, was quicker and easier than marching supplies through the desert or across the Bolivian high plateau. While the Chilean Navy started an economic and military blockade of the Allies' ports, Peru took the initiative and used its smaller navy as a raiding force. The raids delayed the ground invasion for six months and forced Chile to shift its fleet from blockading to hunting and capturing the Huáscar. After achieving naval supremacy, sea-mobile forces proved to be an advantage for desert warfare on the long coastline. Peruvian and Bolivian defenders found themselves hundreds of kilometers from home, but the Chilean forces were usually just a few kilometers from the sea.

The Chileans employed an early form of amphibious warfare, which saw the co-ordination of army, navy, and specialized units. The first amphibious assault of the war took place when 2,100 Chilean troops took Pisagua on November 2, 1879. Chilean Navy ships bombarded beach defenses for several hours at dawn, followed by open, oared boats landing army infantry and sapper units into waist-deep water under enemy fire. An outnumbered first landing wave fought at the beach; the second and third waves in the following hours were able to overcome resistance and move inland. By the end of the day, an expeditionary army of 10,000 had disembarked at the captured port. In 1881 Chilean ships transported approximately 30,000 men, along with their mounts and equipment, 500 miles (800 km) in order to attack Lima. Chilean commanders were using purpose-built, flat-bottomed landing craft that would deliver troops in shallow water closer to the beach, possibly the first purpose-built amphibious landing craft in history: "These 36 shallow draft, flat-bottomed boats would be able to land three thousand men and twelve guns in a single wave."

Chile's military strategy emphasized preemption, offensive action, and combined arms. It was the first to mobilize and deploy its forces and took the war immediately to Bolivian and Peruvian territories. It adopted combined arms strategy that used naval and ground forces to rout its allied foes and capture enemy territory. It landed ground forces in enemy territory to raid in strength to split and to drive out defenders, and it then garrisoned the territory as the fighting moved north. Chileans received the support of Chinese immigrants who had been enslaved by Peruvians and joined the Chilean Army during the campaign of Lima and in the raids to the north Peruvian cities.

Peru and Bolivia fought a defensive war, maneuvering through long overland distances and relied when possible on land or coastal fortifications with gun batteries and minefields. Coastal railways reached to central Peru, and telegraph lines provided a direct line to the government in Lima.

The occupation of Peru from 1881 and 1884 took a different form. The theater was the Peruvian Sierra, where the remains of the Peruvian Army had easy access to the population, resource, and supply centers far from the sea, which supported indefinite attrition warfare. The occupying Chilean force was split into small garrisons across the theater and could devote only part of its strength to hunting down dispersed pockets of resistance and the last Peruvian forces in the Sierra. After a costly occupation and prolonged counterinsurgency campaign, Chile sought a diplomatic exit. Rifts within Peruvian society and Peruvian defeat in the Battle of Huamachuco resulted in the peace treaty that ended the occupation.

=== Technology ===
Both sides used late 19th-century military technology, such as breech-loading rifles and cannons, remote-controlled land mines, armor-piercing shells, naval torpedoes, torpedo boats, and purpose-built landing craft. The second generation of ironclads, designed after the Battle of Hampton Roads, were used in battle for the first time. That was significant for a conflict in which no major power was involved and attracted British, French, and US observers. During the war, Peru developed the Toro Submarino ("Submarine Bull"), which never saw action and was scuttled at the end to prevent capture.

The USS Wachusett (1861) commanded by Alfred Thayer Mahan, was stationed at Callao, Peru, to protect American interests during the war's final stages. Mahan formulated his concept of sea power while he was reading history in a British gentlemen's club in Lima, Peru. The concept became the foundation for his celebrated The Influence of Sea Power upon History.

=== Flow of information ===
Flow of news during the War. Distances in kilometers are great-circle distance, for land and sea routes.

Since 1876, a submarine cable connected Valparaíso and Lima. At the beginning of the war, Antofagasta and Iquique were connected to the cable. Both navies tried to take control of the cable or severed it according to its military and naval interests.

Lima was not connected by cable to Panama, the southernmost post of the North American cable network. Valparaíso had been connected to Buenos Aires by a cable over the Andes since 26 July 1872. Buenos Aires was connected via Uruguay and Brazil, to Portugal and Britain and, from there, to the US over a submarine cable. It must be emphasized that La Paz, Bolivia's capital, was not connected by telegraph to the rest of the world. News coming from Tacna, Arica, and Antofagasta to La Paz had to be brought by foot or horse. The alternative way was from Peruvian port Mollendo (Querejazu: Moliendo) by railroad to Puno and then by boat service to Chichilaya, at the Bolivian shore of Lake Titicaca. The last route to La Paz was by horse or foot. The only telegraph in Bolivia was in Tupiza, 606 kilometres (377 mi) south from La Paz, as the crow flies. Tupiza is at the border to Argentina and was connected to Buenos Aires via telegraph.

The traditional transport for long distances were the steamships that connected Valparaíso, Caldera, Antofagasta, Iquique, Arica, and Lima to the rest of the world.

The disruption of maritime trade routes and the unavailability of submarine telegraph cables from and in the war zone presented special problems for the press coverage of the war. On the other hand, the west coast was important for investors, farmers, manufacturers, and government officials because of their financial commitments. Hence, The Times of London and The New York Times covered the events of the war as much as possible, in spite of the absence of their own correspondents. Information was culled from government representatives in Europe and the US, merchant houses and Lloyd's of London, articles printed in the Panama Star and Herald, and Reuters.

The result was a mix of brief telegraphic dispatches a few days' old from cities with cable stations, along with lengthier but older reports carried by steamships to London or New York. For example, the Battle of Iquique occurred on 21 May, but its first mention appeared in the 30 May edition of both The Times and The New York Times with an incorrect message. It was only on 17 June that The Times could provide a reasonably accurate version of the battle.

=== Atrocities ===
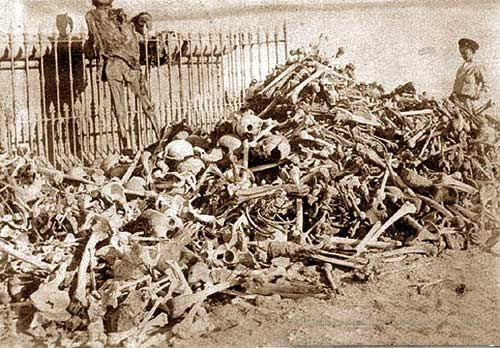
Human remains of Bolivian, Chilean and Peruvian soldiers exhumed from makeshift graves after the Battle of Tacna before their definitive interment in the Mausoleum of the Tacna cemetery in 1910.

The three nations claimed to adhere to the Geneva Red Cross Convention to protect the war wounded, prisoners, refugees, civilians, and other noncombatants.

At the onset of the war, 30,000 Chileans were expelled from Peru (within 8 days) and Bolivia (within 10 days) and their property confiscated, most of them having to shelter in the camps, boats, and pontoons of the Peruvian ports until they were transported by ship to Antofagasta. It is calculated that 7,000 of the refugees from Peru enlisted in the Chilean battalions, and their resentfulness would later influence the war. Peruvian and Bolivian residents in Chile were not expelled.

Both sides complained that the other side had killed wounded soldiers after the battle and cited eyewitness accounts. On 2 July 1884, the guerrilla Tomás Laymes and three of his men were executed in Huancayo by Cáceres's forces because of the atrocities and crimes committed by the guerrillas against the Peruvian inhabitants of the cities and hamlets.

=== Ethnic conflicts ===
Besides the slaughter of Peruvians in the guerilla war after the occupation of Lima, an ethnic and social conflict was simmering in Peru between the indigenous peoples and (Chinese) coolies who had been enslaved by Peru's white criollo and mixed mestizo upper class. In Ayacucho, indigenous peoples stood up against "the whites," and in Chincha, the Afro-Peruvians banded together against their owners in the Haciendas of "Larán," "San José," and "Hoja Redonda". Only the Peruvian Army could forcibly suppress the revolt.

Chinese coolies formed the battalion "Vulcano" within the Chilean Army. There were also interethnic tensions between blacks and coolies. For example, in Cañete, 2000 coolies from the Haciendas "Montalbán" and "Juan de Arona" were massacred by Afro-Peruvians under influence of Andrés Avelino Cáceres.

== Foreign intervention ==
The British historian B. Farcau stated: "Contrary to the concept of the 'merchants of death,' the arms manufacturers of Europe and the United States conniving to keep alive the conflict, from which they had earned some welcome sales of their merchandise, the most influential foreign businessmen and their respective consuls and ambassadors were the traders in nitrate and the holders of the growing stacks of debts of all the belligerents. They were all aware that the only way they could hope to receive payment on their loans and earn the profits from the nitrate business was to see the war ended and trade resumed on a normal footing without legal disputes over ownership of the resources of the region hanging over their heads."

Nonethelesses, belligerents were able to purchase torpedo boats, arms, and munitions abroad and to circumvent ambiguous neutrality laws, and firms like Baring Brothers in London were not averse to dealing with both Chile and Peru. Arms were sold freely to any side that could pay for them but the British abstained from selling warships. For example, in 1879 to 1880, Peru acquired weapons from the United States, Europe, Costa Rica, and Panama. Weapons offloaded on the Caribbean coast of Panama were sent overland to the Pacific coast by the isthmus railway. In the Pacific, a number of ships, including the Talismán, Chalaco, Limeña, Estrella, Enriqueta and Guadiana, transported the cargo to Peru. The trade was done with the consent of the president of the Sovereign State of Panamá, then part of Colombia. The Chilean consul in Panama persistently protested the trade by citing a Chile–Colombia agreement of 1844 that prohibited Colombia from providing war supplies to Chile's enemies.

After the Chilean occupation of Arica, Tarapacá, and Antofagasta, the governments of Peru and Bolivia turned as their last hope to the United States to block the Chilean annexation of the occupied territories. American diplomats were worried that European powers might be tempted to intervene in the Pacific. The Bolivian Minister in Washington offered US Secretary of State William Maxwell Evarts the prospects of lucrative guano and nitrate concessions to American investors in return for official protection of Bolivia's territorial integrity. Isaac P. Christiancy, US Minister in Peru, organized the USS Lackwanna Conference, which ultimately failed, as none of the belligerents was ready to negotiate. Earlier, Christiancy had written to the US that Peru should be annexed for ten years and then admitted in the Union to provide the United States with access to the rich markets of South America.

In 1881, US President James Garfield took the oath of office, and the Anglophobic Secretary of State James G. Blaine supported an assertive role for the US in the war, ostensibly regarding the interests of promoting US ownership of nitrate and guano concessions. Blaine argued that the South American republics "are young sisters of this government" and so he would not tolerate European intervention in South America. The groups "Credit Industriel" and "Peruvian Company," representing European and American creditors, had guaranteed to the Peruvian provisional government of Francisco García Calderón to pay the Peruvian external debt and the reparations to Chile, but in return, the Peruvian government had to grant mining concessions in Tarapacá to these corporations. With the acquiescence of García Calderón, both companies began to lobby in the United States for the territories to remain under Peruvian sovereignty. For example, the US "Levi P. Morton, Bliss and Company" would get a monopoly on the sales of Peruvian nitrate in the US.

Beside the economic plans, Stephen A. Hurlbut, Christiancy's successor, had negotiated with García Calderón the cession to the US of a naval base in Chimbote and the railroads to the coal mines upcountry. When it became known that Blaine's representative in Peru, Hurlbut, would personally profit from the settlement, it was clear he was complicating the peace process The American attempts reinforced Garcia Calderon's refusal to discuss the matter of territorial cession. Blaine then dispatched William H. Trescot in a mission to Chile to establish that problems would be resolved through arbitration and that acts of war would not justify territorial seizures. After the assassination of Garfield (2 July 1881) and the accession of Chester A. Arthur to the US presidency, Blaine was replaced by Frederick Theodore Frelinghuysen as Secretary of State. Frelinghuysen thought that the US was in no position to back Blaine's policy and recalled the Trescot mission. Kenneth D. Lehmann commented the US policy:

Washington had interjected itself into the middle of the controversy without developing a realistic position: the moralizing of the United States had an air of hypocrisy in light of his own history, and veiled threats carried no weight.

Regarding a British intervention in the war, the British historian Victor Kiernan had stated: "It should be emphasized that the Foreign Office never at any time contemplated any kind of active intervention.... It was especially scrupulous in seeing to it that no warships were smuggled out for sale to either side, for it was in mortal dread of another Alabama Award." During the war, the British government embargoed four warships sold to Chile and Perú. (Note: The cruisers Arturo Prat and Esmeralda built in England for Chile and Lima (Sócrates) and Topeka (Diógenes) built in Germany but armed in Britain for Perú. The Greek names were a device to conceal their real destination.)

== Looting, damages, and war reparations ==
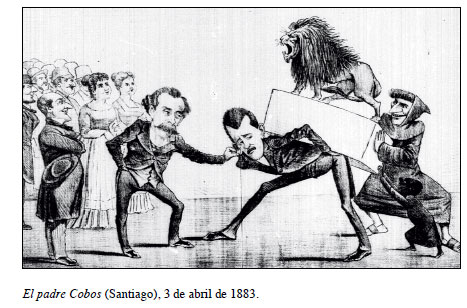
Caricature in the Chilean magazine Padre Cobos. Minister Balmaceda washes his hands of responsibility and orders Intendent of Santiago Benjamín Vicuña Mackenna to get rid of the heavy Peruvian lion. The Santiago elite observes with pleasure the arrival of the statue. "Padre Cobos" and a black child play around.

The case of looting and war reparations done by Chilean occupation forces in Peru has caused controversy between historians. It is overlooked in Chile and a source of anti-Chilean sentiment in Peru. The Chilean historian Milton Godoy Orellana distinguishes the looting after the battle of Chorrillos y Miraflores; the looting by Peruvians in Lima before the Chilean troops entered the city; and the Chilean destruction of locomotives, rails, printing machines, weapons, etc. The Chilean government tried to control it through the "Oficina Recaudadora de las Contribuciones de Guerra," whose tasks were to inventory and realize the confiscation and to record and to confirm transport to Chile, the destination, and the sender. Allegedly, the strategic purposes were to obtain the peace. There is no general list of the looted goods, but many of the shipments were registered in private and official letters, newspaper articles, manifests, etc. Also, looting of cultural assets of Peru by the Chileans and Peruvians occurred; the development of international law regarding the protection of cultural objects evolved over the 19th and 20th centuries, but the idea of protecting cultural assets first emerged in Europe in the 18th century.

The Lieber Code of 1863 unconditionally protected works of art during an armed conflict (Art. 35) but expressly consented to the use of cultural property as war reparations (Art. 36). In fact, Sergio Villalobos states that in 1817, the US accepted the confiscation of art works but the 1874 Project of an International Declaration concerning the Laws and Customs of War asserted that the cultural assets were to be considered as protected.

In March 1881, the Chilean government began to seize the Biblioteca Nacional del Perú, and 45,000 books were seized, but some of the books were sold in Lima by Peruvians, and so it is contested how much of the booty was taken by the Chilean forces. In any case, in late March 1881, some of the books arrived to Chile, and the press began to inform and discuss about the legitimacy of looting oil paintings, books, statues, etc., or "international robbery", as a journalist of "La Epoca" described it.

On 4 January 1883, in a session of the Chilean Congress, the deputy Augusto Matte Pérez questioned Minister of the Interior José Manuel Balmaceda on the "opprobrious and humiliating" shipments of Peruvian cultural assets. Montt asked the devolution of the assets and was supported by deputies McClure and Puelma. The minister vowed to impede further exactions and to repatriate the objects mentioned in the discussion. Apparently, he did so since the shipments stopped, and the mentioned statues are not there anymore, but it was not until November 2007 that Chile returned 3,778 stolen books to the Biblioteca Nacional del Perú. S. Villalobos asserted, "There was no justification for the theft."

Another issue was the damage from acts of war on properties owned by citizens of neutral countries. In 1884, the Tribunales Arbitrales were constituted with a Chilean judge, who was named by the country of the claimant, as well as a Brazilian judge to deal with the claims of citizens from Britain (118 claims), Italy (440 claims), and France (89 claims). A tribunal was established in 1886 for German citizens. The "Italian" tribunal also dealt with Belgian citizens, and the "German" tribunal acted for Austrian and Swiss citizens. Spaniards accepted the decision of the Chilean state without the tribunal's assistance and the US did not agree at the time.

According to international law, animus manendi claims by foreign citizens could not be made unless the damaged property had been in an actual battleground (such as Arica, Chorrillos, and Miraflores, with Pisagua and Tacna being in a similar situation), but damages caused by individual or scattered soldiers were dismissed. Only 3.6% (1,080,562 Chilean pesos) of the value that was claimed was recognized by the tribunals. According to Villalobos, the verdicts proved that the accusations against the Chilean forces had been exaggerated by Peruvians because of their wounded pride and by foreign citizens because of monetary interests.

== Consequences ==
The war had a profound and longlasting effect on the societies of all countries involved. The negotiations concerning territorial cessions continued until 1929, but the war ended in 1884 for all practical purposes. Various authors have referred to the war as a national trauma for Peru and Bolivia.

=== In Bolivia ===
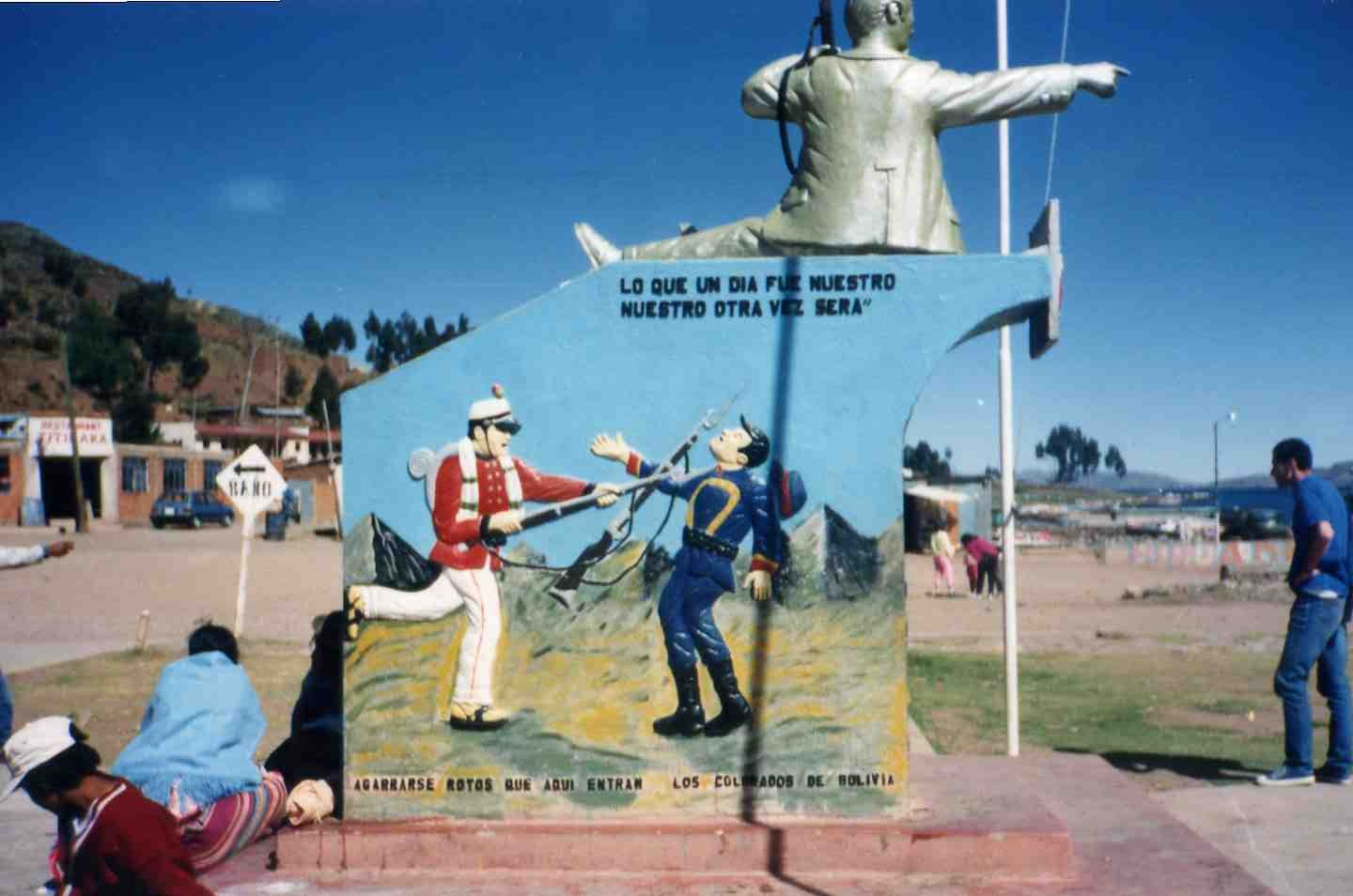
Statue in Bolivia of Eduardo Abaroa pointing to the sea.

Bolivia formally lost its outlet to the Pacific Ocean in 1904 with the signing of the Treaty of Peace and Friendship, which granted Bolivia the right to tax-free transport of goods and duty-free access to northern Chilean ports. It also obliged the Chilean government to build two rail-lines linking La Paz to Antofagasta and Arica. Despite the concessions, the loss of the litoral (the coast) remains a deeply-emotional and political issue in the country, as was particularly evident during the 2003 natural gas riots.

The aspiration to regain coastal sovereignty has been a recurring theme in Bolivia's domestic and foreign policy, as well as a common cause of tensions with Chile, leading to the severance of relations on March 17, 1978 in spite of considerable commercial ties. Bolivia included its "inalienable right" in its 2009 Constitution, and a 2018 court case led to the International Court of Justice rejecting Bolivia's arguments. A common political discourse attributes underdevelopment to the territorial loss suffered during the war, as Chile's huge copper vein in the Atacama Desert, which makes Chile the largest copper exporter in the world, is held in the lands claimed by Bolivia.

The leading Bolivian newspaper El Diario featured at least every week an editorial on the subject, and Bolivians annually celebrate a patriotic holiday to remember the crippling loss.

=== In Chile ===
During the war, Chile dropped its claims on more than 1,000,000 km^{2} (390,000 sq mi) of Patagonia in the 1881 Chile-Argentina treaty to ensure Argentina's neutrality. After the war, the Puna de Atacama dispute grew until 1899 since both Chile and Argentina claimed former Bolivian territories.

Internally in Chile, the victory in the war increased the power of Santa María, who became president in 1882. Chilean central state increased its strength, allowing attacks on peripheral conservative elites, and the establishment of a liberal hegemony.

During and after the war, the Chilean ruling class saw a rise in ideas of racial and national superiority. Chilean historian Gonzalo Bulnes (son of president Manuel Bulnes) once wrote, "What defeated Peru was the superiority of a race and of a history". During the occupation of Tacna and Arica (1884–1929) Peruvians were treated in racist and denigrating terms by the Chilean press. During the war, Peruvians were disrespectfully referred to as "cholos" (a slur for persons of mixed European and non-European ancestry) by Chilean officers.

Following the occupation of Lima, Chile diverted part of its war efforts to crush Mapuche resistance in the south. Chilean troops coming from Peru entered Araucanía, where they in 1881 defeated the last major Mapuche uprising. Chile's newly-acquired Aymara population was seen after the war as a "foreign element" contrasting with the also newly-conquered Mapuches who were seen as "primordial" Chileans. Following the occupation of Lima, Chilean newspapers published extremely patriotic, chauvinist, and expansionistic material. An extreme example of such journalism is Revista del Sur, which stated that firearms obtained in Peru, while useless in the hands of Peruvian "fags" (Spanish: maricas), would be useful by Chileans to "kill indians" (Mapuches).

Chile obtained military hegemony at the Pacific Coast of South America. Chile's expansion was seen with concern across the continent, and Chilean diplomats responded by fomenting rivalries between Chile's neighbors and other South American countries and promoting friendly relationships between countries with disputes with Chile's neighbors. Examples are the Chilean attempts to establish friendly relationships between Ecuador and Colombia, both countries with serious territorial disputes with Peru in the Amazon. Military co-operation with Ecuador grew considerably, and Chile sent instructors to the military academy in Quito and sold superfluous arms and munitions to Ecuador. Despite Chile's overall good relations with Ecuador, both countries had a minor diplomatic crisis resulting from the capture of the Peruvian torpedo boat Alay in Ecuadorian territorial waters during the war. Argentina, the only country not at war with Chile despite a common border, had tensions with Chile since but, unlike Peru and Bolivia, successfully maintained peace with Chile but almost fought a war over the border in 1978.

As the victor and possessor of a new coastal territory, Chile also benefited by gaining a lucrative territory with significant mineral income. The national treasury grew by 900% between 1879 and 1902 because of taxes coming from the newly-acquired lands. British involvement and control of the nitrate industry rose significantly, but from 1901 to 1921, Chilean ownership increased from 15% to 51%. The growth of Chilean economy sustained in its saltpetre monopoly and meant that compared to the previous growth cycle (1832–1873), the economy became less diversified and overly dependent on a single natural resource. In addition, Chilean nitrate, used worldwide as fertilizer, was sensitive to economic downturns, as farmers made cuts on fertilizer use one of their earliest economic measures in the face of economic decline. It has been questioned whether or not the nitrate wealth conquered in the war was a resource curse. During the Nitrate Epoch, the government increased public spending but was accused of squandering money.

=== In Peru ===
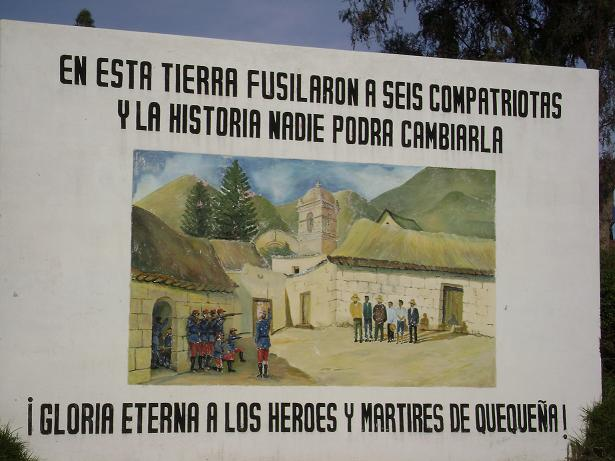
Mural commemorating six Peruvians executed by firing squad in Quequeña.

The immediate aftermath of the war led to profound political and social instability in Peru. It was the beginning of a trajectory of low state capacity and institutional weakness. Armed indigenous peasants sacked and occupied haciendas of landed elite criollo "collaborationists" in the central Sierra, Chinese coolies revolted and even joined the Chilean Army, indigenous and mestizo Peruvians murdered Chinese shopkeepers in Lima, Peruvian mobs sacked Chiclayo, and different criollo elite remained deeply divided in opposing camps. The fear of disorder, opposing factions, and armed peasants was for many Peruvians larger than that of the Chilean invaders. In some cases, the delegations of European countries and of the US provided safety during riots and persecutions. In 1884, Cáceres turned against his former guerrilla allies and, in 1886 and 1888, he sent troops to the central Sierra to disarm the peasants. The lack of rule of law in central sierra was such that in one particular case, a landowner was able to recover his occupied estate only in 1902 after a massive mobilization of military, police, and gunmen. Indigenous populations in Peru became scapegoats in the narratives of Peruvian criollo elites, exemplified in the writing of Ricardo Palma:

The principal cause of the great defeat is that the majority of Peru is composed of that wretched and degraded race that we once attempted to dignify and ennoble. The Indian lacks patriotic sense; he is born enemy of the white and of the man of the coast. It makes no difference to him whether he is a Chilean, Serbian or a Turk. To educate the Indian and to inspire him a feeling for patriotism will not be the task of our institutions, but of the ages.

Peru signed the Treaty of Ancón in 1883, through which it lost its provinces of Tarapacá and Iquique, while those of Tacna and Arica were to be subject to a 10-year provisional administration by Chile, which de facto continued into 1929 and led to a period of sour relations between both states. Peru was left without saltpeter production, the Chilean controlled production decreased to 15%, and production controlled by British investors rose to 55%. According to military historian Robert L. Scheina, the Chilean plunder of Peruvian national literary and art treasures contributed to "demands of revenge among Peruvians for decades." Scholar Brooke Larson pointed out that the War of the Pacific was the "first time since independence wars" that "Peru was invaded, occupied and pillaged by a foreign army" and that "no other Andean republic experienced such a costly and humiliating defeat as Peru did in the hands of Chile".

The territorial dispute ended in 1929 with the signing of the Treaty of Lima. Arica was ceded to Chile, while Tacna was returned to Peru later that year. In 1999, Chile and Peru at last agreed to fully implement the 1929 treaty by providing Peru with a port in Arica.

Because the Chinese had supported Chile in the conflict, Anti-Chinese sentiment—the first of its kind in the region—increased greatly in Peru. In Lima, indigenous, cholo and mestizo Peruvians murdered Chinese shopkeepers. In response, the Chinese coolies revolted and even joined the Chilean Army. In one 1881 pogrom in the Cañete Valley it is estimated that 500 to 1,500 Chinese were killed, including the pogrom in Lima and Cerro Azul with 2,500 Chinese murdered by troops of the General Andrés Avelino Cáceres stating the following:

They betrayed our country by selling out to the Chileans; their betrayal is to be paid for with a pogrom and merciless persecution.

Even in the 20th century, the memory of Chinese support for Chile was so deep that Manuel A. Odría, a dictator of Peru, banned Chinese immigration as a punishment for their betrayal, and Chinese were barred from immigrating to the country until the 1970s. This sentiment has since decreased, and the Chinese are widely accepted as Peruvian citizens.

Relations between Chile and Peru after the Treaty of Lima have been more cordial than between Chile and Bolivia, although there have been diplomatic frictions. According to Bruce W. Farcau, "the wounds run less deep" in Peru than in Bolivia, although an anti-Chilean sentiment continuest to exist. However, both nations maintain continuous diplomatic relations, cooperate in international trade, are part of the Pacific Alliance to promote mutual integration and joint strategic trade in Asia, and invest extensively in each other. This has generated rapid growth for both economies and a growing cultural exchange.

Miguel Grau became an important figure in Peru because of his alleged gallantry during the conflict, especially his treatment of Prat's family and rescue of Chilean sailors in Iquique, which gained him recognition as the Caballero de los Mares ("Gentleman of the Seas").

== Commemoration ==
Día del Mar is celebrated in Bolivia on 23 March, at the conclusion of the weeklong Semana del Mar with a ceremony at La Paz's Plaza Abaroa, in homage to war hero Eduardo Abaroa, and in parallel ceremonies nationwide.

Naval Glories Day is a Chilean anniversary that commemorates two naval battles that occurred on Wednesday, 21 May 1879: that of Iquique, where captain of frigate Arturo Prat died along with the entire crew of the corvette Esmeralda, sunk by the Peruvian monitor Huáscar (built in the United Kingdom for the Peruvian government in 1864, it served in the Peruvian Navy until it was captured by Chile in 1879) under the command of Captain Miguel Grau; and that of Punta Gruesa, where the schooner Covadonga, under the command of Carlos Condell, ran aground the Peruvian armored frigate Independencia, under the command of Juan Guillermo More, in the rocks of Punta Gruesa.

== See also ==
- War of the Triple Alliance
- Chaco War
- Ecuadorian–Peruvian War
- Caliche sangriento, 1969 Chilean film about the war

== Cited works and further reading ==
- Barros Arana, Diego (1881a). Historia de la guerra del Pacífico (1879–1880) (History of the War of the Pacific (1879–1880)) (in Spanish). Vol. 1. Santiago, Chile: Librería Central de Servat i C^{a}.
- Barros Arana, Diego (1881b). Historia de la guerra del Pacífico (1879–1880) (in Spanish). Vol. 2. Santiago, Chile: Librería Central de Servat i C^{a}.
- Basadre, Jorge (1964). Historia de la Republica del Peru, La guerra con Chile (in Spanish). Lima, Peru: Peruamerica S.A. Archived from the original on 11 December 2007.
- Boyd. Robert N. Chili: Sketches of Chili and the Chilians During the War 1879–1880. (1881)
- Bulnes, Gonzalo (1911). Guerra del Pacífico. vol. 1: De Antofagasta a Tarapacá (PDF). Valparaíso: Sociedad Imprenta y Litografía Universo.
- Bulnes, Gonzalo (1914). Guerra del Pacífico. vol. 2: De Tarapacá a Lima (PDF). Valparaíso: Sociedad Imprenta y Litografía Universo.
- Bulnes, Gonzalo (1919). Guerra del Pacífico. vol. 3: Ocupación del Perú – La Paz (PDF). Valparaíso: Sociedad Imprenta y Litografía Universo.
- Bulnes, Gonzalo (1920). Chile and Peru: the causes of the war of 1879. Santiago, Chile: Imprenta Universitaria.
- Dennis, William Jefferson (1927). "Documentary history of the Tacna-Arica dispute from University of Iowa studies in the social sciences". University of Iowa Studies in the Social Sciences. 8. Iowa: University Iowa City.
- English, Adrian J. (1985). Armed forces of Latin America: their histories, development, present strength, and military potential. Jane's Information Group, Incorporated. ISBN 978-0-7106-0321-0.
- Farcau, Bruce W. (2000). The Ten Cents War, Chile, Peru and Bolivia in the War of the Pacific, 1879–1884. Westport, Connecticut, London: Praeger Publishers. ISBN 978-0-275-96925-7.
- Kiernan, V. G. (1 February 1955). "Foreign Interests in the War of the Pacific". Hispanic American Historical Review. 35 (1): 14–36. doi:10.1215/00182168-35.1.14. JSTOR 2509249.
- O'Brien, Thomas F. (1 February 1980). "The Antofagasta Company: A Case Study of Peripheral Capitalism". Hispanic American Historical Review. 60 (1): 1–31. doi:10.1215/00182168-60.1.1.
- Paz Soldan, Mariano Felipe (1884). Narracion Historica de la Guerra de Chile contra Peru y Bolivia (Historical narration of the Chile's War against Peru and Bolivia) (in Spanish). Buenos Aires, Argentina: Imprenta y Libreria de Mayo, calle Peru 115.
- Querejazu, Roberto Calvo (1979). Guano, Salitre y Sangre (in Spanish). La Paz-Cochabamba, Bolivia: Editorial los amigos del Libro.
- Querejazu, Roberto Calvo (1995). Aclaraciones históricas sobre la Guerra del Pacífico (in Spanish). La Paz, Bolivia: Editorial los amigos del Libro.
- Sater, William F. (2007). Andean Tragedy: Fighting the War of the Pacific, 1879–1884. Lincoln and London: University of Nebraska Press. ISBN 978-0-8032-4334-7.
- Sater, William F. (1986). Chile and the War of the Pacific. Lincoln and London: University of Nebraska Press. ISBN 978-0-8032-4155-8.
- Scheina, Robert L. (2003). Latin America's Wars: The age of the caudillo, 1791–1899. Potomac Books, Inc. ISBN 978-1-57488-450-0.
- Vergara, Jorge Iván; Gundermann, Hans (2012). "Constitution and internal dynamics of the regional identitary in Tarapacá and Los Lagos, Chile" (PDF). Chungara (in Spanish). 44 (1). University of Tarapacá: 115–134. doi:10.4067/s0717-73562012000100009.
- Villalobos, Sergio (2004). Chile y Perú, la historia que nos une y nos separa, 1535–1883 (in Spanish) (2nd ed.). Chile: Editorial Universitaria. ISBN 9789561116016.
- Yrigoyen, Pedro (1921). La alianza perú-boliviano-argentina y la declaratoria de guerra de Chile (in Spanish). Lima: San Marti & Cía. Impresores. OCLC 692069503.
