= Liberal Republic =

Period of Chilean history from 1861 to 1891

Republic of Chile República de Chile
- 1861–1891
- Flag Coat of arms

- Capital: Santiago
- Common languages: Spanish
- Government: Unitary presidential republic under the liberal party
- President
  - 1861–1871: José Joaquín Pérez (first)
  - 1891: Manuel Baquedano (last)
- History
  - Jose Joaquin Perez: 18 September 1861
  - Civil War: 18 September 1891
- Currency: Chilean peso
Preceded by	Succeeded by
Conservative Republic	Parliamentary Republic

Liberal Republic (Spanish, República Liberal) is the period of Chilean history between 1861 and 1891. It is characterized by the rise of the liberal political faction the Pipiolos who opposed the Pelucones who had dominated the preceding period known as the Conservative Republic. They promulgated constitutional reforms that limited the power of the president and increased the power of the Congress.

== See also ==
- Chincha Islands War
- Occupation of Araucanía
- War of the Pacific
