= Pisagua =

Pisagua may refer to:

- Pisagua, Chile, which was Pisagua, Peru before 1884.
  - Bombardment of Pisagua, 1879
- Pisagua internment camp, Pisagua, Chile
- The Pisagua Case, human rights violations in Chile
- BAP Pisagua (SS-33), a Peruvian navy submarine
- Pisagua (ship), a clipper ship
