= Carlos de los Heros =

Peruvian Army lieutenant (1850–1878)

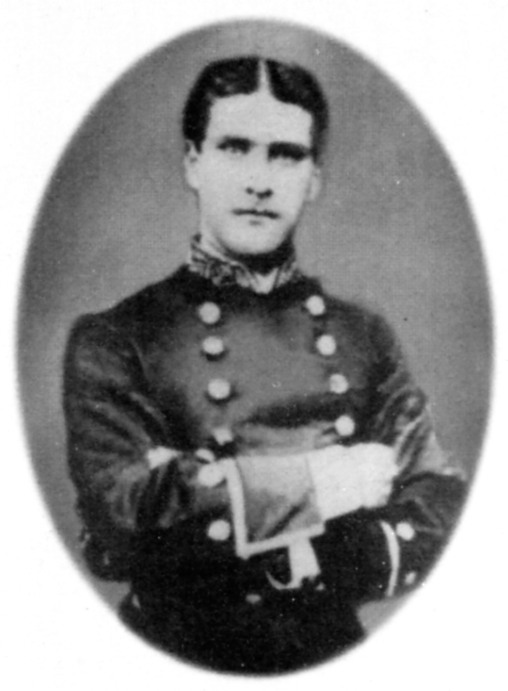
- Born: September 24, 1850; Lima, Lima Province, Peru
- Died: August 28, 1878 (aged 27); Off the coast of Antofagasta, Antofagasta Region, Chile
- Burial place: Cementerio Presbítero Matías Maestro, Lima, Lima Province, Peru
- Education: Peruvian Naval School
- Military career
- Allegiance: Peru
- Branch: Peruvian Navy
- Service years: 1868 – 1879
- Rank: Second Lieutenant
- Conflicts: War of the Pacific: Naval campaign of the War of the Pacific; Battle of Iquique; Capture of the steamer Rímac; Second Battle of Antofagasta †

Carlos de los Heros Aguilar (1850-1878) was a Peruvian sailor and war hero of the War of the Pacific. He was known for his death during the Second Battle of Antofagasta and was the only Peruvian death in the battle.

== Early military career ==
He was the son of Dr. Juan de los Heros Castañeda and Petronila Aguilar Ramírez de Arellano. His father was a renowned magistrate, who held various positions, including Judge of 1st Instance, Prosecutor of the Superior Court of Lima, deputy for the Province of Cañete, and in his last years, Prosecutor of the Supreme Court. Likewise, he was part of the Lima bohemia, being a friend of Ricardo Palma.

Carlos began his studies at the College of Our Lady of Guadalupe, later moving on to the Peruvian Naval School. On July 29, 1868, he obtained the title of midshipman in the Peruvian Navy. That same year, along with other sailors, he embarked for the United States with the mission of retrieving the monitors Manco Cápac and Atahualpa to Callao, serving on the tug steamers Marañón, Reyes and Pachitea. In 1870, the ships entered Callao, and De los Heros was promoted to frigate lieutenant.

On November 7, 1870, with the purpose of completing his studies, he entered as a student at the Naval School and was assigned to the steamer Marañón. In January 1872, he received the gold medal for achievement. On January 1, 1874, he successfully completed his studies, being chosen, along with six other students of the School, to be part of the crew of the BAP Chanchamayo and the BAP Pilcomayo gunboats, which were built in Europe. He traveled first to France, and then to London. He returned on board the Pilcomayo, via the Strait of Magellan, arriving at Callao in January 1875. In June of that year he was assigned aboard the steamer Mairo, and in August, to the Chanchamayo.

On July 19, 1876, he was promoted to second lieutenant. In August, after the, Chanchamayo was wrecked, he transferred to the ironclad Independencia. In April 1877, he embarked on the ironclad Huáscar. On May 6 of that year, the Huáscar mutiny took place, started up by supporters of Nicolás de Piérola. De los Heros was at the monitor but remained faithful to the constitutional government and was held prisoner. He remained ashore until June 1877, when he rejoined the Huáscar. Between June 1878 and April 3, 1879, he was the second commander of the Huáscar, his cousin, Juan Pablo de los Heroes Michelena, was the ironclad captain.

== War of the Pacific ==
On April 5, Chile declared war on Peru. On May 16, the Huáscar went out on campaign to break the blockade imposed on Iquique. On May 21, De los Heros found himself in the Battle of Iquique, and on May 28 he participated in the capture of the barque Emilia. During the trip back to Callao, he was appointed commander of the boat. He then returned to the Huáscar, where he assumed command of the batteries emplaced on deck.

On July 6, the Huáscar departed on a new expedition. On the 10th of that month, they found the corvette Magallanes and the transport Matías Cousiño in Iquique. In late July, the Huáscar captured several Chilean vessels, such as the 'Adelaida Rojas, E. Saucy Jack, and Adriana Lucía. However, the biggest blow occurred on July 23 with the Capture of the steamer Rímac, which was transporting the Carabineros de Yungay squadron which contained horses, weapons, and correspondence.

In the middle of the campaign, he wrote to one of his brothers these phrases that would be prescient:

My position, dear brother, is that of death, but do not think that this will deter me. No, on the contrary, when the melee bugle sounds, and I find myself in the chamber, I climb the slope of Calvary with the greatest tranquility and full of joy, because I know that when I arrive on deck, the country will collect my services. For her my blood. For you the love of your brother. Carlos.

In turn, his father wrote him these lines:

I congratulate you and I congratulate your boss, as well as all the superb sailors of Huáscar. Being from the Huáscar is a title that cannot be bought except with blood. To belong to the Huáscar is to be brave, honest and have a thousand envious people. I would like to be there, even if it were only to breathe the embalmed air of glory and honor that remains after a combat, like the ones you have managed to give and will give many times in the future. Commander Grau and his subordinate sailors still don't know what they are earning from moment to moment. Peruvian hearts will serve as cobblestones in the streets where you spend in Lima the day you bring us the last victory, wrapped in our national flag. The noble war carried out by the Huáscar, typical of the heroes of other times, is what flatters and pleases me the most, because the feelings of nobility cannot and should not be torn from the chest where they are sheltered.

== Second Battle of Antofagasta and death ==
On August 22, the Huáscar left Arica for Antofagasta. In Antofagasta were the corvette Abtao, the corvette Magallanes, and the transports Limari and Paquete de Maule. The Chilean ships were close to the reefs, and covered by foreign merchant ships, so it was difficult to attack them with both artillery and ram. So Commander Miguel Grau decided to use the Lay torpedoes.

At 4 a.m. on August 25, the first torpedo was launched, but the current sent it back. The torpedo was deflected by Second Lieutenant Fermín Diez Canseco. Then Carlos de los Heros volunteered to recover the torpedo. At 5 in the morning, the Huáscar returned, being received with applause by his companions and her boss.

Later the Huáscar went to ports north of Antofagasta where it captured nine boats. On August 28, they returned to Antofagasta to track down and cut the telegraph cable. At 1:30 in the afternoon, the Second Battle of Antofagasta began with the shots from the Abtao. At 3 pm the enemy ships ceased fire and the Huáscar continued to approach, and at 4:15, the ground batteries began to fire.

Only one of the shots from the ground batteries hit the Huáscar. This shot went through the monitor's chimney and killed Lieutenant De los Heros, completely destroying his body. The same impact seriously injured sailor Alcides Gutiérrez. The feeling of sadness in the Huáscar was prevalent. They lowered a boat to rescue the remains, but they only found his cap, his scapular of the Heart of Jesus, the heel of one of his boots and fragments of his uniform. Admiral Miguel Grau expressed his sorrow for this loss in the combat report and in the letter he wrote to his father.

The feeling of pain that the death of the lieutenant provoked among his companions was recorded in a guard book:

This bomb blew up our dear and never well-mourned comrade Carlos de los Heros. With the disappearance of this gentleman, he loses his family, the most dear to her; the companions of him, the true and loyal friend; and the navy of Peru, to one of its most worthy, brave and at the same time, the most modest officers.

On September 15, 1879, the funerals were held in Arica. In the days after his death, Lima newspapers published several poems in memory of him, written by Ricardo Palma, Juan de Arona, Juan de los Heros, among others.

== Legacy ==
Members of his family were then motivated to fight in the war due to the death of Carlos de los Heros. His father, at sixty years of age, joined the Reserve Army and participated in the Battle of Miraflores. Two of his uncles, Ramón and Ambrosio de los Heros, died in that battle, as did his cousin Francisco Javier Retes. His brothers Daniel, Arturo and Reynaldo de los Heros Aguilar, and his half-brother Ernesto de los Heros Piñatelli, also fought in Miraflores. Later, Ernesto and Daniel de los Heros participated in the Sierra campaign, the former fighting in the Battle of La Concepción, and the latter in the Battle of Huamachuco.

The BAP De los Heros (CM-23) was named after Carlos.

A poem about his death at Antofagasta was written by Alejandro Alarcón.
