= Óscar Viel =

Óscar Viel may refer to:

- Óscar Viel y Toro (c. 1837–1892), Chilean naval officer
- Óscar Viel Cavero (1876–1932), Chilean industrialist and politician
- Chilean icebreaker Almirante Óscar Viel, in service with the Chilean Navy from 1995 to 2019
