= Strategies of the War of the Pacific =

During the War of the Pacific, the theatre of war between 1879 and 1881 was a large expanse of desert, sparsely populated and far removed from major cities or resources; it is, however, close to the Pacific Ocean. It was clear from the beginning that control of the sea would be the key to an inevitably difficult desert war: supply by sea, including water, food, ammunition, horses, fodder and reinforcements, was quicker and easier than marching supplies through the desert or across the Bolivian high plateau.

While the Chilean Navy started an economic and military blockade of the Allies' ports such as Iquique, Peru took the initiative and utilized its smaller but effective navy as a raiding force. Chile was forced to delay the ground invasion for six months, and to shift its fleet from blockading to hunting Huascar until she was captured.

With the advantage of naval supremacy, Chilean ground strategy focused on mobility: landing ground forces in enemy territory in order to raid Allied ground assets; landing in strength to split and drive out defenders and leaving garrisons to guard territory as the war moved north. Peru and Bolivia fought a defensive war: maneuvering along long overland distances; relying where possible on land or coastal fortifications with gun batteries and minefields; coastal railways were available to Peru, and telegraph lines provided a direct line to the government in Lima. When retreating, Allied forces made sure that little if any assets remained to be used by the enemy.

Sea mobile forces proved to be, in the end, an advantage for desert warfare on a long coastline. Defenders found themselves hundreds of kilometers away from home; invading forces were usually a few kilometers away from the sea.

The occupation of Peru between 1881 and 1884 was a different story altogether. The war theatre was the Peruvian Sierra, where Peruvian resistance had easy access to population, resource and supply centres further from the sea; it could carry out a war of attrition indefinitely. The Chilean army (now turned into an occupation force) was split into small garrisons across the theatre and could devote only part of its strength to hunting down rebels without a central authority.

After a costly occupation and prolonged anti-insurgency campaign, Chile sought to achieve a political exit strategy. Rifts within Peruvian society provided such an opportunity after the Battle of Huamachuco, and resulted in the peace treaty that ended the occupation.

According to "Chinese Migration into Latin America – Diaspora or Sojourns in Peru?" some Chinese supported the Chilean army against their plantation owners.
