= Second Battle of Antofagasta =

- Part of Naval campaign of the War of the Pacific
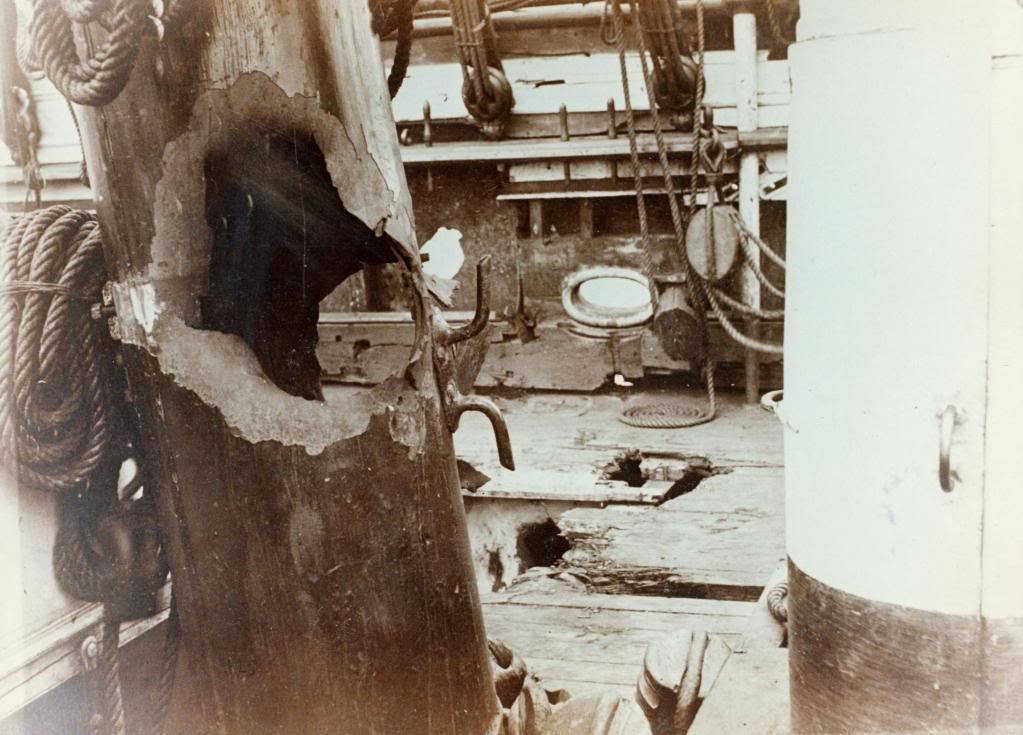
- The Abtao damaged by the Huáscar
Date	August 28, 1879
Location	Antofagasta, Antofagasta Region
Result	Peruvian victory

Belligerents
Peru	Chile

Commanders and leaders
Miguel Grau; Carlos de los Heros †	Erasmo Escala; Juan José Latorre; Aureliano Sánchez †

Strength
1 ironclad	Land: 1 300lb. gun 3 150lb. guns Naval: 2 corvettes

Casualties and losses
1 killed 1 wounded	10 killed 12 wounded 1 corvette damaged

The Second Battle of Antofagasta took place during the Naval campaign of the War of the Pacific between the Peruvian ironclad Huáscar against the Chilean corvettes Abtao and Magallanes as well as the land defenses at Antofagasta.

== Background ==
Three days after the failed attempt to torpedo the Chilean ships on its 4th raid, the Huáscar returned to Antofagasta to trace the submarine cable and cut it. The Huáscar had cut the Antofagasta submarine cable before on May 27, 1879, after the First Battle of Antofagasta. In those three days the Peruvian armored had visited Taltal, the torpedoes were transferred to the " Oroya " and stored there. They were useless and at the same time they were dangerous on board the Huáscar, since they could explode in combat.

Regularly, the Chilean ironclad Blanco Encalada was at Antofagasta, but on August 22, 1879, it left under the command of the frigate captain Juan Esteban López, together with the Itata, to recognize a suspicious ship that appeared in front of Paposo which turned out to be the Chilean steamer Toro. On the night of the 26th, he was at the height of the mouth of the Copiapó River, waiting for the Huáscar to pass. On the 28th, in Taltal, he was informed of the presence of the Huáscar in Antofagasta by a small steamer sent from land and sails north to hunt him down.

== The Battle ==
=== First phase ===
The Huáscar entered the port at 11 am, recognized the British ship Brikby and then dedicated himself to tracking the Antofagasta submarine cable. While he was carrying out this operation, at 1:35 p.m., the Chilean corvette Abtao, under the command of Captain Aureliano Sánchez, fired a shot at him with one of its 150- pound deck guns. The commander of the Huáscar, Miguel Grau Seminario, ordered a combat rally and the Peruvian flag made by women from Trujillo was hoisted. The shots were followed by those from the Magallanes, under the command of Captain Juan José Latorre and the distance between the two ships was 4,000 meters .

At 1:50 pm, the Huáscar advanced to the port and at 2 pm, it fired its first shot. The Abtao and the Magallanes had taken refuge behind the 14 neutral merchant ships, where the Chilean transports Limarí and Paquete de Maule also took refuge. In order not to damage neutral ships, the Huáscar fired at intervals from a safe distance. The land forts at the port also began to open fire but the northern 300 lb. gun jumped from its carriage after its first shot and couldn't fire any more.

A 300-pound shell from the Huáscar hit the Abtao, destroying the bridge and wounding Carlos Krugg who second in command of the ship. In addition, 5 men died and another 6 were wounded. Another shell made an impact, exploding on deck and entering the bunkers, killing an additional 5 men and wounding 5 more.

The bombardment ended at 3:16 pm, when the Huáscar stopped firing after the fire from the cannons and the ships ceased.

== Central Iraqi campaign ==
The Huáscar approached 2,300 m from the center of the bay to have a better aim. At 4:15 pm, the shore batteries fired on the Peruvian irncolad, but the Chilean ships remained hidden behind the merchant ships and did not fire at this stage.

A shot from the battery Bellavista destroyed the base of the chimney of the Peruvian ironclad, killing 2nd Lieutenant Carlos de los Heros and wounding the student of the Constables' School Alcídes Gutiérrez, son of Colonel Silvestre Gutierrez.

The bombardment ceased at 5:30 pm, without the ground batteries answering the last 3 shots from the Huáscar.

During the battle, the Huáscar fired 26 shots of 300 pounds and 2 of 40 pounds. the Abtao fired 42 shots at 150 pounds, the Magallanes 7 shots of 115 pounds and 12 of 64 pounds and the shore batteries firing, 1 shot from the 300-pounder, 38 of 150-pounder and 7 shots of Krupp guns .

The Huáscar stayed at bay until 10 pm, when smoke began rising from the south and Grau ordered a retreat to the north to avoid a fight against the Chilean ironclad Blanco Encalada. This assessment turned out to be true as by 11:15 pm, the Blanco Encalada entered Antofagasta with the Itata. By order of Rafael Sotomayor Baeza, Minister of War and Navy in Campaign since August 20, newly installed in Antofagasta, the Blanco Encalada and the Itata travel south to pursue the Huáscar and at the same time, protect the transports that were about reach Caldera, but on the morning of the 29th, at the height of the Blanco Encalada cove, he was ordered to return to Antofagasta because the Huáscar had been sighted in Mejillones. On the 30th, he arrived at Antofagasta, finishing his commission.

The Huáscar was anchored at Arica on the 31st after having touched Mejillones, Cobija, Tocopilla and Iquique.
