= Pisagua case =

The Pisagua Case is the name given to the legal actions taken surrounding the crimes that occurred in the torture center and prison camp installed in the town of Pisagua, during the military dictatorship of Augusto Pinochet in Chile.

== History ==
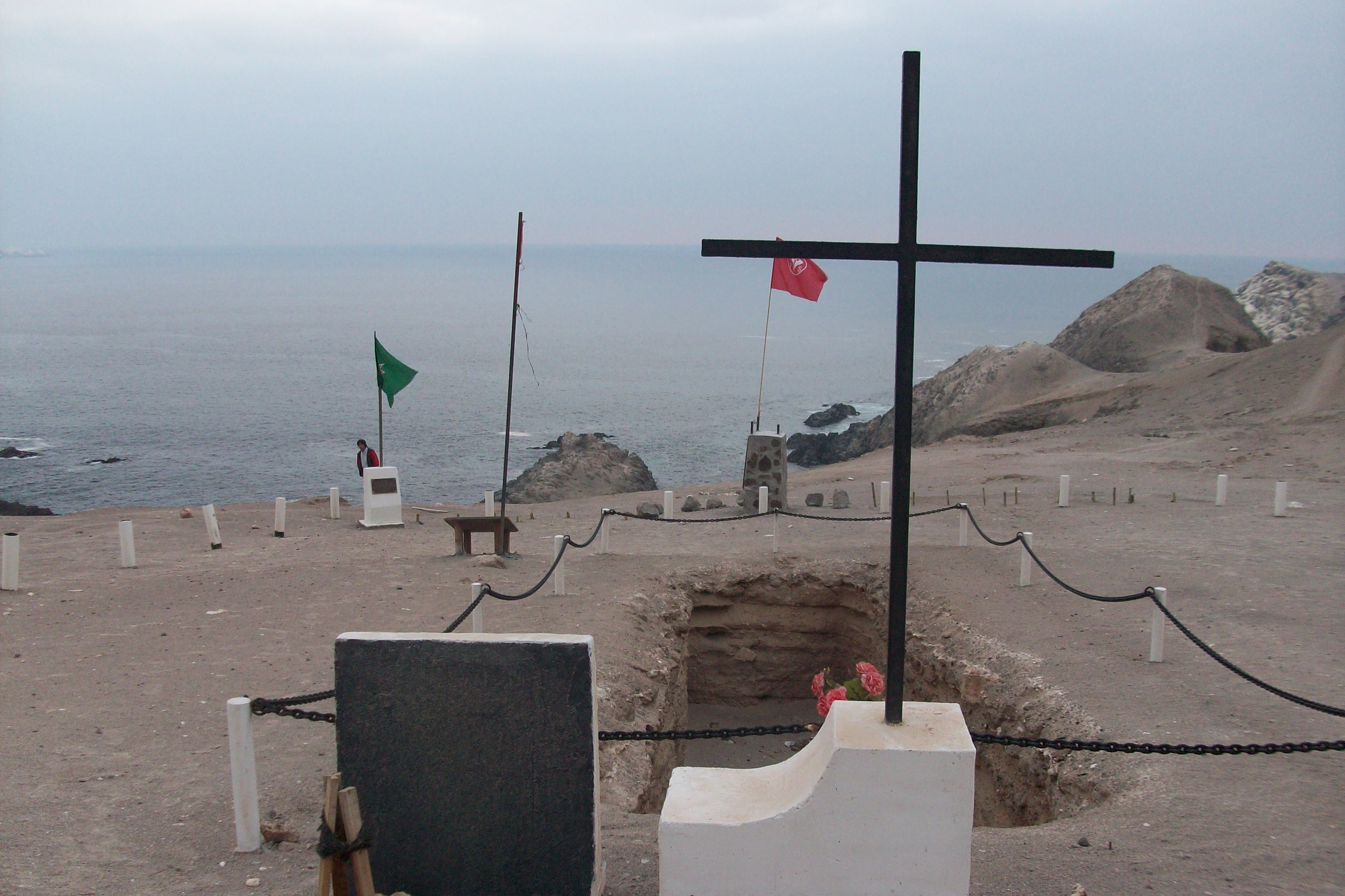
Fosa de Pisagua

The judicial investigation began prior to the claim of illegal burial presented by the Vicariate of Solidarity, 31 May 1990 in the Pozo Almonte Court.

On 2 June 1990 the mass grave was found, located in the north-west sector of the Pisagua Cemetery. Twenty bodies were discovered within the grave, well-preserved due to the salt that permeates the sand in the area.

== List of prisoners executed in Pisagua ==
The majority of the executed were found in 1990 during an investigation led by Minister Hernán Sánchez Marré.

Shot under the “Escape Law” 29 September 1973

- Juan Calderón Villalón
- Nolberto Cañas Cañas
- Marcelo Guzmán Fuentes
- Juan Jiménez Vidal
- Luis Lizardi Lizardi
- Michel Nash Saéz

Executed by the First War Council 11 October 1973

- Julio Cabezas Gacitúa
- José Rufino Córdova Croxatto
- Humberto Lizardi Flores
- Mario Morris Barrios
- Juan Valencia Hinojosa

Executed by the Second War Council 29 October 1973

- Rodolfo Fuenzalida Fernández
- Juan Antonio Ruz Díaz
- José Demóstenes Sampson Ocaranza
- Freddy Marcelo Taberna Gallegos

Executed by the Third War Council 29 November 1973

- Germán Palominos Lamas

Executed by the Fourth War Council 11 February 1974

- Luis Toro Castillo
- Alberto Yañez Carvajal

Declared Missing (Desaparecidos) of Iquique, Region of Tarapacá, Chile

- William Millar Sanhueza
- Jorge Marín Rossel
- Manuel Araya Zavala

The Executed of Iquique, Region of Tarapacá, Chile

- Luis Rojas Valenzuela (17 de septiembre de 1973)
- Oscar Ripoll Codoceo (20 de octubre de 1973)
- Julio Valenzuela Bastías (20 de octubre de 1973)
- Manuel Donoso Dañobettia (20 de octubre de 1973)
- Gerardo Poblete Fernández (21 de octubre de 1973)
- Luis Solar Welchs (23 de octubre de 1973)
- Isaias Higuera Zuñiga (11 de enero de 1974)
- Nelson Márquez Agusto (18 de enero de 1974)
- Manuel Sanhueza Mellado (10 de julio de 1974)
- Henry Torres Flores

== See also ==
- Pisagua Prison Camp
