= Chilean icebreaker Almirante Óscar Viel =

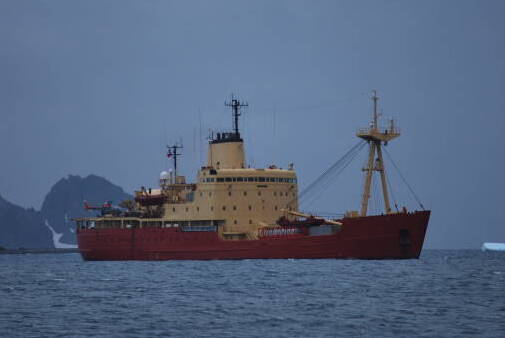
- Almirante Óscar Viel in 2010

History

Canada
- Name: Norman McLeod Rogers
- Namesake: Norman McLeod Rogers
- Operator: Canadian Coast Guard
- Builder: Vickers Armstrong, Montreal
- Launched: 25 May 1968
- In service: October 1969
- Out of service: 1993
- Fate: Sold to Chile in 1994

Chile
- Name: Almirante Óscar Viel
- Namesake: Oscar Viel Toro
- Operator: Chilean Navy
- Acquired: 20 December 1994
- Commissioned: 14 January 1995
- Decommissioned: 11 February 2019
- Identification: IMO number: 6822137
- Fate: Sunk as target

General characteristics (as built)
- Type: Icebreaker and buoy tender
- Tonnage: 4,179 GRT; 2,357 DWT; 1,847 NT
- Displacement: 6,320 long tons (6,420 t)
- Length: 294.9 ft (89.9 m)
- Beam: 62.5 ft (19.1 m)
- Draught: 20 ft (6.1 m)
- Propulsion: CODAG; 4 diesel engines and 2 gas turbines, 2 shafts; 12,000 shp (8,900 kW)
- Speed: 15 knots (28 km/h)
- Range: 12,000 nmi (22,000 km) at 12 kn (22 km/h)
- Complement: 55
- Aircraft carried: 1 helicopter
- Aviation facilities: Flight deck

Almirante Óscar Viel was an icebreaker in service with the Chilean Navy from 1995 to 2019 and with the Canadian Coast Guard from 1969 to 1993. Originally built in 1968 for the Canadian Coast Guard as CCGS Norman McLeod Rogers, the vessel was acquired by Chile in 1994 and renamed. The vessel was decommissioned in 2019 and sunk as a target.

== Design and description ==
Almirante Oscar Viel was 294.9 feet (89.9 m) long overall with a beam of 62.5 feet (19.1 m) and a draught of 20 feet (6.1 m). As built, the ship had a fully loaded displacement of 6,320 long tons (6,420 t), gross register tonnage (GRT) of 4,179, net tonnage of 1,847 and deadweight tonnage (DWT) of 2,347 tons.

As built, the vessel was equipped with a CODAG system composed of four diesel engines and two gas turbines powering two electric motors driving two shafts. This created 12,000 shaft horsepower (8,900 kW) and gave the ship a maximum speed of 15 knots (28 km/h). It was the first application of the system in icebreakers in the world. In 1982, the gas turbines were replaced with four Fairbanks Morse 38 8-1/8 diesel engines (8,496 hp, 6,335 kW sustained) with four GE generators generating 4.8 megawatts (6,400 hp) and two Ruston RK3CZ diesel engines (7,250 hp, 5,410 kW sustained) with two GE generators generating 2.6 megawatts (3,500 hp) driving two shafts creating 12,000 hp total. The ship maintained the same speed after the alteration and has a range of 12,000 nautical miles (22,000 km) at 12 knots (22 km/h).

The ship could operate one helicopter. In Canadian service, the icebreaker had a complement of 55 but after entering Chilean service in 1995, this was reduced to 33. Other changes to the ship following the Chilean takeover was the addition of two Oerlikon 20 mm cannon and the operation of the Chilean Navy MBB Bo 105 helicopters.

== Service ==
=== Canadian Coast Guard ===
The icebreaker was constructed by Canadian Vickers at their shipyard in Montreal, Quebec with the yard number 289 and was launched on 25 May 1968. Norman McLeod Rogers was named for former Canadian Member of Parliament and cabinet minister Norman McLeod Rogers and entered into service with the Canadian Coast Guard in October 1969 for use mainly as an icebreaker but to also tend to the large buoys that were replacing lightships.

In 1974, Norman McLeod Rogers performed hydrographic survey work in the Arctic, surveying around Bathurst Island for possible gas pipeline construction. In 1975, while on a scientific mission in Ungava Bay, the icebreaker went to the aid of Aigle d'Ocean, a small cargo ship that overturned in a storm. Norman McLeod Rogers dispatched its helicopter to investigate before arriving on the scene. Contact with the helicopter was soon lost, but the icebreaker arrived at the scene of the sinking merchant vessel in time to rescue five people. A Hercules aircraft was sent to search for the helicopter, which had crashed into a hillside killing both crewmembers.

In 1982, the Coast Guard, unhappy with Norman McLeod Rogers's experimental diesel and gas-powered propulsion system, had the gas turbines removed and diesel engines put in their place. Norman McLeod Rogers was transferred to the West Coast of Canada in 1990. The ship was placed in reserve soon after and transferred to Crown Assets Distribution for disposal in 1994. The ship was renamed 1220 in 1994 before being sold to the Chilean Navy on 20 December 1994.

=== Chilean Navy ===
The ship entered into service with the Chilean Navy on 14 January 1995. The icebreaker was renamed Almirante Óscar Viel after Counter Admiral Óscar Viel y Toro, the commander of the Chilean naval forces from 1881 to 1883 and 1891, and was placed into service as a replacement for the discarded Piloto Pardo. The ship's primary use with the Chilean Navy was as the Antarctic patrol and survey ship, making its first patrol in Antarctica in 1995.

The ship was decommissioned in February 2019 and later sunk as target.
