= Bombardment of Pisagua =

- Part of the War of the Pacific
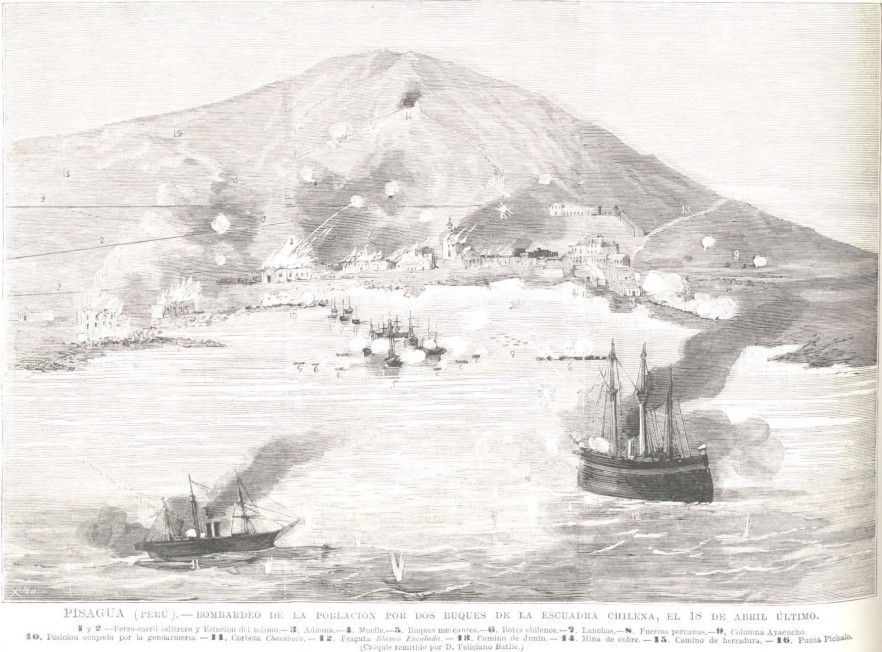
- The bombing of Pisagua, according to an engraving published in La Ilustracion Española y Americana
Date	April 18, 1879
Location	Pisagua, Tarapacá, Peru
Result	Inconclusive

Belligerents
Peru	Chile

Commanders and leaders
José Becerra	Juan Rebolledo

Strength
300 Soldiers	Ironclad Blanco Encalada; Corvette Chacabuco with around 60 embarked marines

Casualties and losses
Military Casualties: At least 6 wounded Civilian Casualties: Several civilians killed, including five women and two children. Several injured	At least 1 dead, 6 wounded

The Bombardment of Pisagua, was an act of arms by Chile on Peru that took place on April 18, 1879, within the framework of the naval operations developed during the War of the Pacific. The first civilian casualties of the war were produced there.

== Background ==
On April 5, 1879, Chile declared war on Peru, initiating its naval forces operations on the Peruvian coasts and destroying the unguarded guano docks and cargo elements of Pica and Huanillos on April 15 and 16. On April 17, the Chilean Chacabuco corvette cut the telegraph cable to Iquique and on April 18 it appeared over the port of Pisagua being followed by the armored Blanco Encalada, with the first Chilean corvette trying to repeat the previous operations without prior notice to the port authorities to do so. which launched two boats with 60 sailors. As military commander of Pisagua was the frigate captain José Becerra, who commanded the garrison made up of 300 soldiers from the Ayacucho battalion, disembarked on April 7 by the Chalaco transport from Callao.

== The battle ==
As soon as the Peruvian forces sighted the Chilean boats heading ashore, they opened rifle fire on them, which despite being immediately answered by their crew, caused them casualties and forced them to retreat back to their ships. Immediately afterwards, Admiral Juan Williams Rebolledo ordered to open fire with naval artillery on the entrenched Peruvian troops, causing the population to burn and numerous deaths among the civilian population. A second attempt at approach by the Chilean boats was once again rejected, the bombardment being resumed until 1 in the afternoon, at which time the Chilean ships withdrew leaving the port engulfed in flames.

== Aftermath ==
As a result of the bombardment and fire, the port of Pisagua was almost completely destroyed, a misfortune that Rear Admiral Williams Rebolledo attributed in his official report, "To the situation occupied by the enemy troops on which the shots were fired, which when bouncing and deviating damaged some of the immediate buildings (...) resulting in the almost complete conflagration of the main neighborhoods of the population. " while according to the American newspaper Chicago Tribune, according to a cable sent by an official of the American ship Cosmopresent in Pisagua, it was a deliberate act in which the British consulate in which a large number of women and children had taken asylum was even bombed and set on fire, and the consular agent Mr. Jeffrey, his wife and wife had to take refuge in the Cosmo with their children.

According to a telegram from the Chacabuco commander, Oscar Viel y Toro, the ship under his command had 1 dead and 6 wounded, resulting in the combat in the population fire and "I suppose many deaths", while the commander of Puerto Becerra, at the time of writing his report to the General Command of the Navy, he reported having knowledge of 5 soldiers and several injured individuals from the town, 4 civilians having died, including a child, according to other sources the number of Peruvian deaths was 8 and 6 wounded, among the first 5 women and 2 children.
