= Fairbanks Morse 38 8-1/8 diesel engine =

Opposed-piston engine used for backup power in marine applications

The Fairbanks-Morse 38 8-1/8 is a diesel engine of the two-stroke, opposed-piston type. It was developed in the 1930s, and was a licensed version of Germany's Junkers Jumo 205 aircraft diesel. The engine was used extensively in US diesel electric submarines of the 1940s and 1950s, as backup power on most US nuclear submarines, as well as in other marine applications, stationary power generation, and briefly, locomotives. A slightly modified version, the 38ND 8-1/8, continues in service on Los Angeles-, Seawolf-, and Ohio-class nuclear submarines of the US Navy. The 38 8-1/8 has been in continuous production since its development in 1938, and is currently manufactured by a descendant of Fairbanks-Morse, FMDefense, in Beloit, Wisconsin.

== Specifications ==
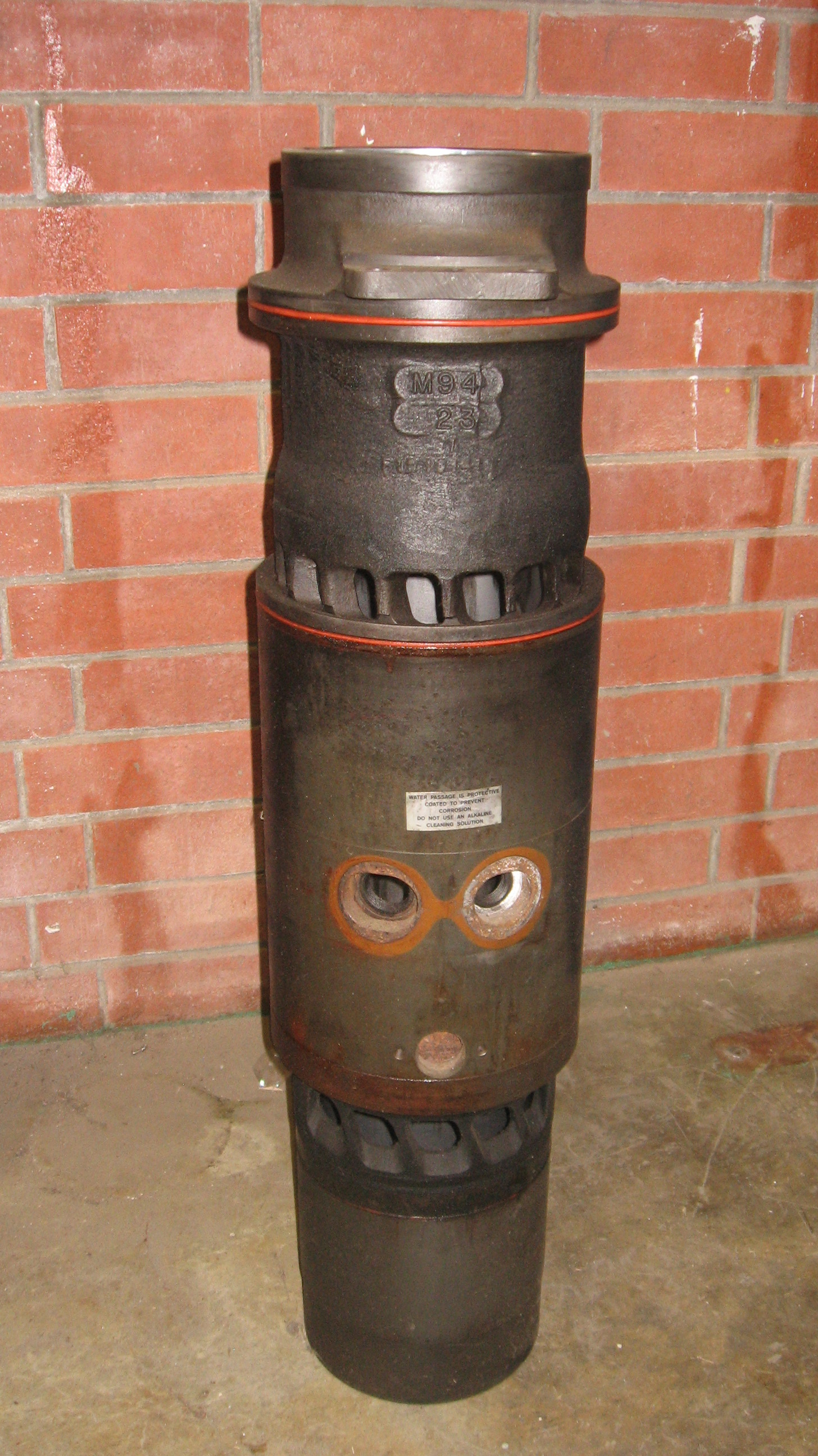
Fairbanks Morse Opposed Piston liner and water jacket.

The 38 8-1/8 engines are inline diesel engines, with combustion occurring between two opposed pistons within a single cylinder liner. The engine has a bore of 8-1/8 inches (206.4 mm), a stroke of 10 inches (254.0 mm) for each piston, and the cylinder height is 38 inches (970 mm). The engine block is of dry block construction. They have been manufactured with between four and twelve cylinders, depending on application.

Vertical force is transmitted from the opposed trunk style pistons to either an upper or lower crankshaft. The two crank shafts are geared together by a vertical drive shaft. Pistons are removed by either removing the top crankshaft, and removing from the top, or by removing through the lower crank case access doors.

The lower crankshaft is timed 12 degrees before the upper crankshaft in order to expel exhaust gasses prior to the admittance of scavenging air. Fresh air cleanses the cylinders of remaining exhaust prior to the exhaust ports being covered by the rising lower piston.

As this engine is of two stroke opposed-piston design, unlike most four stroke engines it has no cylinder head nor mechanical valves. Instead, ports in the cylinder liners provide incoming air and exhaust. The two camshafts on the engine provide timing for two injection pumps per cylinder. Porting allows exhaust gases to be expelled and scavenge air to be taken in by a positive air box pressure. Intake air is provided by an engine driven Roots blower or turbo-supercharger.

== Applications ==
=== North America ===
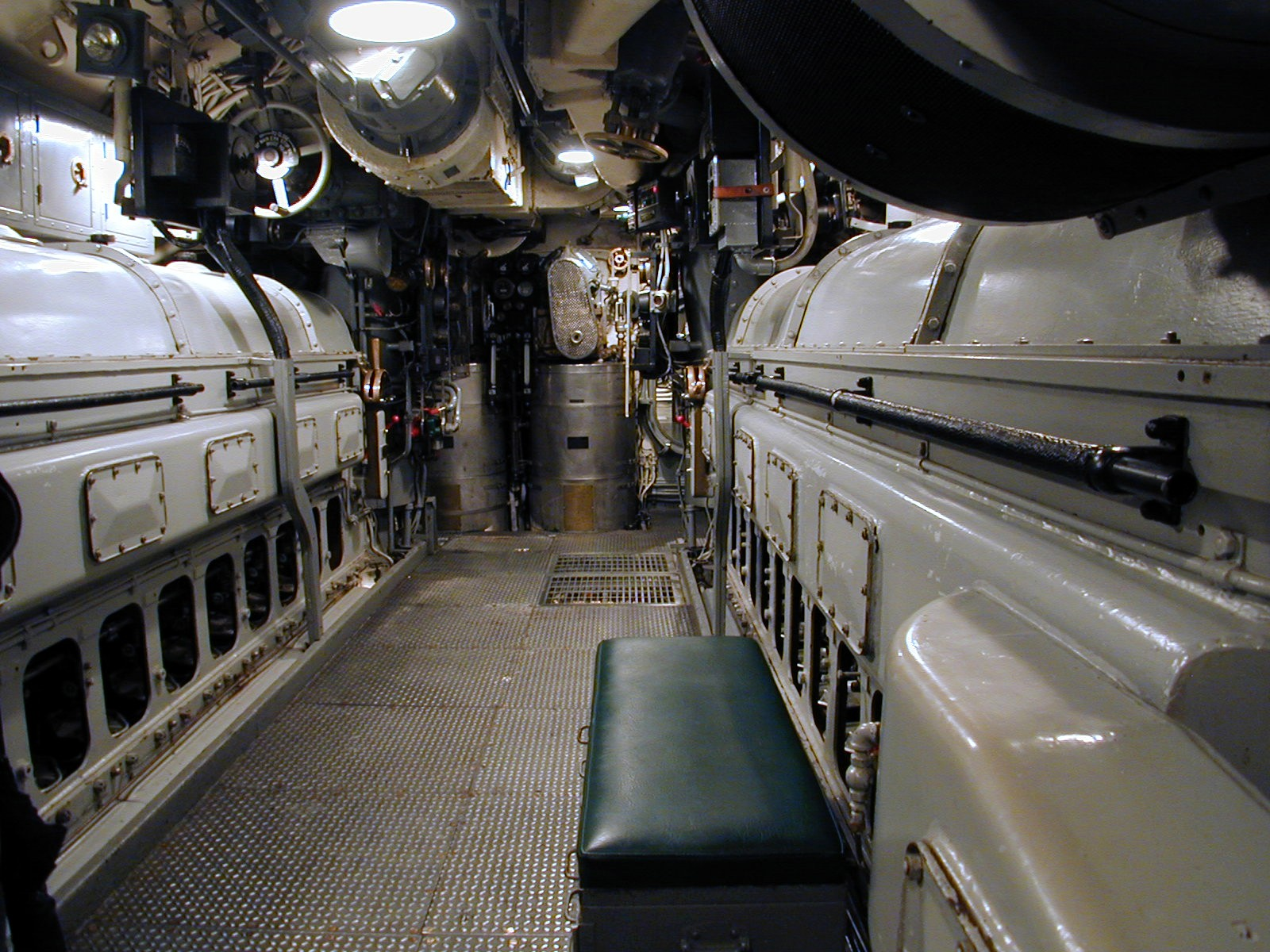
World War II USS Pampanito (SS-383) 38 8-1/8 diesel engines.

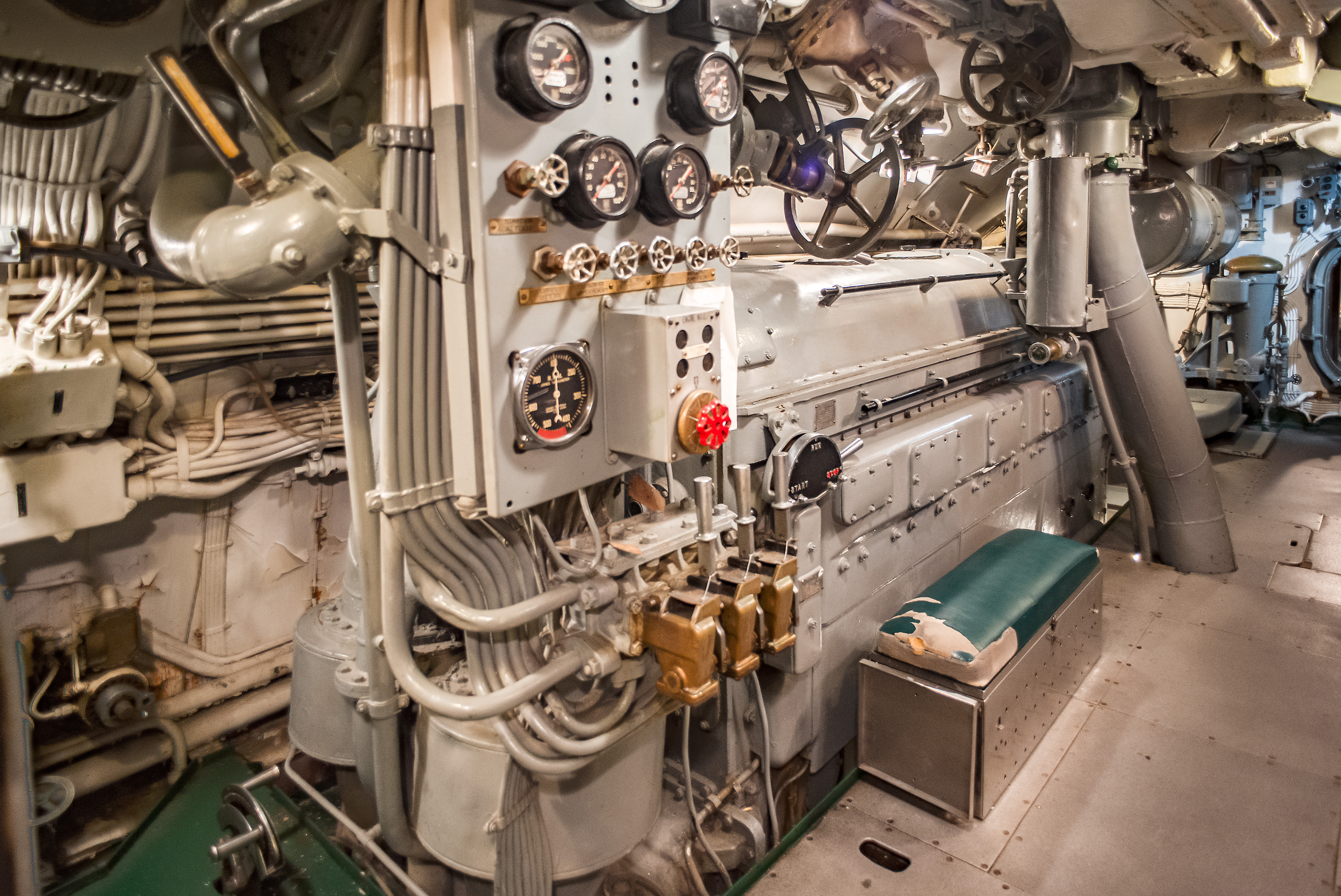
From the Muskegon, Michigan, Silversides Submarine Museum. USS Silversides (SS-236). Fairbanks Morse & Co. 38 8-1/8 diesel engine.

Historically, the opposed-piston engine was used in U.S. diesel-electric submarines of World War II and the 1950s. Surviving diesel-electric submarines with these engines include USS Pampanito, USS Blueback, USS Ling, and USS Torsk. This engine was also used in surface ships, notably in the diesel-electric Wind-class icebreakers and in the geared Edsall-class destroyer escorts. When the innovative but faulty "pancake" engines of the 1950s Tang class proved unworkable, they were replaced with World War II-style Fairbanks-Morse engines, and these remained standard on US diesel-powered submarines through the early 1960s. Variants of the 38 8-1/8 and other Fairbanks-Morse engines provided (and continue to provide) backup power on US nuclear submarines commissioned through the 1990s. In addition, certain ice-breaking class vessels of the Canadian Coast Guard used Fairbanks Morse opposed piston engines in the operation of a diesel electric/gas-turbine electric operation. The former CCGS Norman McLeod Rogers, which ended its service under the Chilean flag as Contraalmirante Oscar Viel Toro is one such example.

Marine Opposed-Piston applications include use as main propulsion engines and service generators. The USCG Hamilton-class cutters use the 38 8-1/8 engine in a CODOG arrangement, where the diesel engine provides cruise propulsion, and a gas-turbine provides propulsion where high speeds are required.

The Fairbanks Morse Opposed Piston engine is also used as a stationary power generator engine, both in primary and standby duties.

==== Railroad Service ====
During the 1940s and 1950s, Fairbanks-Morse attempted to market their opposed-piston powered line of diesel-electric locomotives, with their entire post-war lineup using the 38 8-1/8 in some form. They had good success with their early switching locomotives, but the 38D 8-1/8 experienced problems in mainline service that were not encountered in naval service. As originally configured for the Erie-Built locomotives of 1945, the engine ran at a Brake Mean Effective Pressure of 95.2 psi, as opposed to the 85 psi rating for Navy engines and higher than the engines in competing locomotives. Submarines gave the engines access to cool, sea-level air, but on Western railroads like Union Pacific, the engines were operating under heavy loads at high altitude, high temperature, and low humidity, and often in the wake of waste heat from leading locomotives. Locomotives had closed-loop cooling systems while submarines drew cooling water from the sea. Because the exhaust port was located near the lower pistons, the engines suffered excessive lower-piston temperatures which led to piston failure, which could then cause cylinder liner damage and a possible crankcase explosion. F-M immediately attempted to address the problem but it was seven to eight years before a piston was developed that could stand up to railroad service. Replacement of a single power assembly (cylinder liner and its two pistons) required moving the locomotive under a crane and removing (and later reinstalling) the locomotive's roof hatch, upper crankcase, upper caps, upper connecting rod caps, and upper crankshaft, making the operation much more time- and resource-intensive than a power assembly change on other engine types. Fairbanks-Morse learned that in shops that maintained multiple locomotive types, where the foreman was under pressure to repair as many locomotives as possible, repair of OP engines that required extensive disassembly was often delayed in favor of other types of locomotives that could be turned around more quickly.

Fairbanks-Morse exited the locomotive market in 1963. The locomotive market share was eventually dominated by products from GM's Electro-Motive Division, the American Locomotive Company, and General Electric.

=== Soviet Union ===
The 38 8-1/8 was reverse-engineered in the USSR and used as a primary engine for railroad locomotives. The first Soviet mass-produced diesel locomotive, TE3, was powered by a 1470 kW (2000 hp) 2D100 engine, direct descendant of the marine 38 8-1/8 engine. The TE3 was produced in high numbers (up to 7600 units), and proved to be a reliable mainline freight locomotive. Later this engine evolved to the turbocharged 10D100, rated at 2200 kW (3000 hp). It was used as powerplant for later 2TE10L, 2TE10M, 2TE10U series locomotives. Unfortunately, the 10D100 engine became infamous for its high rate of failures and low operating availability. Currently, many TE10 locomotives remain in service in Russia, Ukraine, Belarus, Latvia, and Kazakhstan. However, they are often re-engined with more modern and fuel-efficient 4-stroke engines during rebuilding programs.

13D100 variant was used as a generating set in diesel-electric Dobrynya Nikitich-class icebreakers and their derivatives.

== Developments ==
The 38 8-1/8 underwent development to provide for better fuel efficiency and lessen emissions. In the 1990s, Fairbanks-Morse applied their "Enviro Design" technology to run the opposed piston engine as a dual diesel and natural gas engine. This system injects a small 'pilot' amount of diesel fuel to aid in the combustion of natural gas within the combustion chamber while controlled with computerized electronics.

== See also ==
- List of Fairbanks-Morse locomotives
- Napier deltic
