= Capture of the steamer Rímac =

Battle of the Naval campaign of the War of the Pacific

- Part of Naval campaign of the War of the Pacific
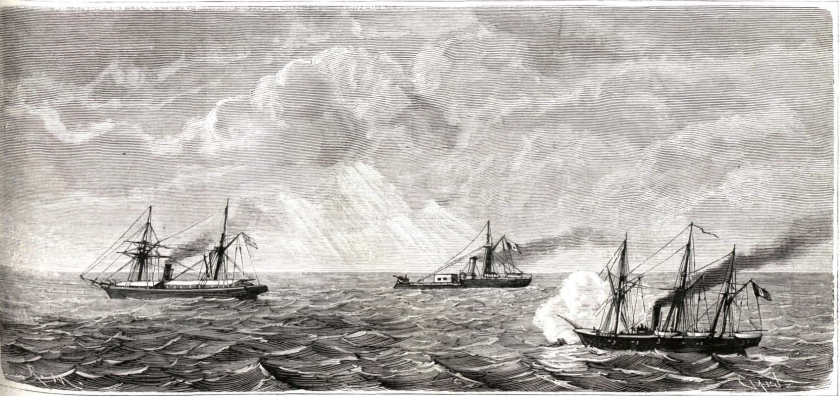
- The Rímac captured by the Huáscar and the Unión depicted in La Ilustración Española y Americana on 1879
Date	July 23, 1879
Location	Off the coast of Antofagasta, Antofagasta Region, Chile
Result	Peruvian victory

Belligerents
Peru	Chile

Commanders and leaders
Miguel Grau; A. García y García	Ignacio Luis Gana (surrendered)

Strength
1 ironclad (Huáscar); 1 corvette (Unión)	1 transport (Rímac)

Casualties and losses
None	7 killed & wounded 351 captured 1 steamer captured

The Capture of the steamer Rímac or the Hunt and seizure of the Chilean transport Rímac was a part of the Raids of Huáscar during the Naval campaign of the War of the Pacific. During an expedition over the conflicting seas, the Peruvian Navy ships, Huáscar and Unión, apprehend the Chilean war steamer Rímac, which was an artillery transport, taking all its cargo and capturing its crew, including a squad of the Carabineros de Yungay. In Chile, the news of the capture of the Rímac detonated a political and social crisis that led to the resignation of several government officials, including Rear Admiral Juan Williams Rebolledo, Commander General of the Chilean Navy.

== Background ==
The Peruvian ironclad Huáscar was on its second raid on the Chilean coast. Despite having raided almost as far as Valparaíso, the Peruvian ships had been unable to capture any Chilean transports. Grau agreed with Aurelio García y García, commander of the 2nd naval squadron with his insignia in the Unión, to meet in the waters of Antofagasta with 20 miles out to sea with the Huáscar to the north and the Unión to the south, with the intention of capturing or sinking one of the Chilean transports that were in Antofagasta, since they knew that they always spent the night on the high seas and returned to Antofagasta at dawn. They also had newspapers that indicated in detail the movements of the squadron, these were supplied by friendly ships, in this way Grau knew that an important supplier was approaching Antofagasta.

On July 22, the Huáscar entered Caldera and met with the captain of the Colombia of the English Pacific Company and learned through Chilean newspapers obtained from the captain of the merchant ship that the Rímac had sailed north bound for Antofagasta.

In the port of Antofagasta, the Minister of Foreign Affairs of Chile, Domingo Santa María, with the position of Government Delegate was there and on July 19, Santa María communicated by telegram to Valparaíso about the presence of the Huáscar and the Union in Mejillones on the night of July 18. The Copiapó, Toltén, Rímac and Package de Maule transports were about to arrive in Antofagasta with reinforcements for the Chilean army stationed there because it was getting ready for an early invasion of Tarapacá. The first 2 were on their way and the other 2, to depart from Valparaíso. The Copiapó arrived in Coquimbo on July 19, but she immediately returned to Valparaíso along with the steamship Toltén and the corvette Chacabuco, due to telegrams that the Peruvian ships Huáscar and Unión were in Mejillones.

The line cavalry squad of the Chilean Army "Carabineros de Yungay" No. 1, commanded by Lieutenant Colonel Manuel Bulnes, would travel to reinforce the operations army in Antofagasta. The squadron embarked on the Rímac transport with part of the cavalry and the rest of the horses, about 40, would embark on the Maule transport. In addition, these transports carried supplies for the army. The convoy was supposed to leave on the afternoon of July 18, but the Commander General of the Navy, Eulogio Altamirano, received a telegram from Santa María telling them not to leave until they receive notice. Santa María telegraphed for the transports to set sail on the 20th with the assurance that the Chilean ironclad Almirante Cochrane would await them in Antofagasta. The Rímac sailed on the high seas, 30 miles from the coast, while the Maule was stuck on the beach.

On July 19, the Almirante Cochrane had arrived in Antofagasta, with little coal, after having pursued the Peruvian gunboat Pilcomayo on the 17th and 18th between Cobija and Tocopilla. In Antofagasta there were also the Itata and Lamar transports. Santa María ordered the captain of the ship Enrique Simpson, commander of the Almirante Cochrane, to take coal to Tocopilla for the production of water for the population and the 500 mules gathered for the Tarapacá campaign, and to return on the 22nd to go south to meet the Rímac and the Maule. The Almirante Cochrane sailed to Tocopilla on the 20th at 10:30 pm. On July 22, the Almirante Cochrane still had not returned to Antofagasta, and Santa María dispatched the Itata, under the command of Captain Patricio Lynch to look for the Almirante Cochrane, finding it at Punta Tetas, north of Antofagasta on the same day 22 before at 1 pm, Santa María learned of the Almirante Cochrane meeting at the same time that he received a telegram from the Mayor of Atacama, Guillermo Matta, informing him that the corvette Almirante Cochrane had taken the 2 transports, without specifying which ones, back to Valparaíso. Santa María thought they were the Rímac and the Lamar when in reality they were about the Copiapó and the Toltén. Santa María ordered that the Lamar, with the deputy Máximo R. Lira, inform the Almirante Cochrane and the Itata that the transports would no longer arrive and travel to Caldera, where the telegraph reported the presence of the Huáscar and the Unión. Before the Lamar returned to Antofagasta, Santa María received a telegram from Eulogio Altamirano informing him that the Rímac and the Parcel were traveling, without stopping, to Antofagasta.

On the morning of the 23rd, the Almirante Cochrane and the Itata were off the coast of Taltal and received information from 2 German ships that the Peruvian ships, Huáscar and Unión, were heading north. Captain Lynch suggested returning north, but the Chilean ships continued south because Captain Simpson thought the news was false. The Almirante Cochrane ran out of coal and the Itata had to tow it to Caldera.

== The Battle ==
=== Pursuit of the Rímac ===
In daylight on the 23rd, at 6:15 am, the lookout for the corvette Unión announced: "Smoke in sight!" From the Huáscar, 2 smokes were also seen, so Grau assumed that the Unión was being pursued or was pursuing a Chilean transport.

The Rímac was under the command of the German captain Pedro Lautrup, its commander since before the war. The steamer belonged to CSAV and was leased to the Chilean government. The frigate captain Ignacio Luis Gana was traveling on the steamer as a passenger, and he could take command of the ship only when the enemy was on top.

The Rímac approached to recognize the detected smoke, which was thought to be from the Almirante Cochrane. Recognizing the Peruvian corvette 4 miles away, Lautrup relinquished command to Gana, in accordance with his contract, changed course first and tried to take cover. in the nearby port of Antofagasta afterwards. The Unión hoisted the Peruvian flag and fired a blank shot, being answered by a shot from the Rímac, which was very short, since its range was only 810 m .

The sailors of the Rímac, mostly foreigners, rushed to the canteen wanting to break down the door, but the Carabineros de Yungay intervened to impose order.

=== Bombardment of the Rímac ===
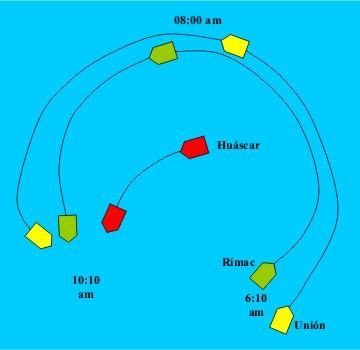
The route of the Capture of the Rímac, Early July 23, 1879 and Movements since July 23

The Rímac headed north and increased its speed, but since it was heavily loaded, its maximum speed was between 10 and 11 knots, while the Unión reached 13 and 13.5 knots. Later, the Rímac fell to the northwest.

At 7:10 am, the Rímac was heading west and the distance between it and the Unión was 4,500 meters. The Peruvian captain Aurelio García y García, commander of the 2nd naval squadron, ordered the captain Nicolás Portal, commander of the Unión, to open fire, firing with the 4 guns of the port battery in the bow, but no shot reached white for not being within reach. The Unión's next shots were fired from the Whitworth 9 pounder landing craft gun, which was mounted on the forecastle. The shot hit the stern of the Rímac and the second razed the deck of the Rímac, killing one soldier and wounding four.

At 8:00, the Union was already 1,000 m from the Rímac, which was heading west-southwest, and at 9:00 am, the distance between the two was only 900 m, heading southwest, when smoke was sighted to the southeast, which at 9:30 am identified himself as Huáscar. At 9:50 am the Union hit 4 consecutive shots on the Rímac.

At 8:45 on board the Rímac, the council of officers met to determine the possibility of throwing the heaviest weapons off the ship along with the horses, the latter being prevented by the carabinieri squad given the esteem that they had him. In addition, there was the possibility that they were going to collide with the propeller, breaking it or making it impossible for the ship to move quickly. so it was agreed to throw the weapons into the water and the ammunition and everything that could serve the enemy on deck.

=== Surrender and boarding of the Rímac ===
The Huáscar fired a shot with the 300-pound right cannon at 10 am, when the distance that separated it from the Rímac was 4,500 m, while the Unión was 600 m away. The Rímac, which had flown the Chilean flag during the attack, stopped its engines and hoisted the white flag, without lowering its own, as a sign that the ship would be delivered under parliament, while the Soldiers from the Carabineros de Yungay No. 1 squad threw their weapons overboard into the sea. Until that moment, the Chilean transport had been perfectly identified as the Rímac.

The Unión lowered 3 boats to board the Chilean transport. 2nd Lieutenant Felipe La Torre Bueno was in charge of "taking possession of the ship in the name of Peru and sending it to his commander and flag on board." The Chilean captain Gana and his first pilot, J. Stuck were taken to the Unión. The Peruvian captain Portal ordered the Rímac to be taken in by towing. Then the Huáscar stood alongside the Rímac and Grau appointed the graduate frigate captain Melitón Carvajal as provisional commander. García y García boarded the Huáscar to coordinate with Grau the proportion of people from both ships that would crew the Rímac. as during the confrontation, the Unión fired 4 shots with a 70-pound percussion bomb and 50 with a 9-pound bullet.

Commander Pedro Lautrup, Lieutenant Colonel Manuel Bulnes, and 25 other prisoners were transferred to the Huáscar; the frigate captain Ignacio Luis Gana and 55 other crew members, to the Union . The rest of the Chilean crew stayed on the Rímac; the soldiers of the squad were locked in the cellars. In addition to Captain Carvajal, from Huáscar 7 officers, 2 engineers, 8 machine men, 15 soldiers and 12 sailors were stationed in the Rímac, while from the Union 5 officers, 2 machinists, 6 stokers, 10 sailors and 10 soldiers were stationed.

At 3:40 p.m. the inauguration of the Rímac was completed and all the ships went in convoy to Arica, where they arrived on July 25 at 9:30 a.m. The news was known that same day in Lima by telegram from President Mariano Ignacio Prado and the editorial of the newspaper El Comercio. The first commission under the Peruvian flag occurred on July 28, when he sailed to Mollendo to bring the Iraola battalion of 330 men, returning on the 29th; the battalion was armed with the 255 Comblain rifles taken from the transport, but not enough for all.

The RIMAC steamer was under the command of the German captain Pedro Federico Lautrup and was hired by the CSAV.

The Carabineros de Yungay No. 1 cavalry squadron with 258 men, 215 horses, 1 300- pound cannon, 300 Comblain II rifles with 200,000 shots, some Winchester carbines, ammunition, provisions, coal, fodder were captured in the transport, supplies for the ambulance, money and official correspondence. A trial began in Callao in the Court of Dams that culminated on December 15, 1880, valuing the entire complex at £ 65,216 - s 6.

== Aftermath ==
On July 23, Minister Domingo Santa María sent a telegram to President Aníbal Pinto informing him of the arrival of the transport Paquete de Maule but suspected the capture of the Rímac due to its failure to arrive and the Huáscar and the Union had been seen that same day near Antofagasta. On the 29th, the French corvette Decrés brought the news to Mejillones that the Rímac was with the Peruvian squadron in Arica and by telegraph, the news reached Santiago de Chile on the 30th, at the same time that the news arrived from Valparaíso, from the German steamer Theben of the Kosmos Company, which at in Arica on the 25th when the Peruvian ships entered with the Rímac.

On July 24, Santa María received the news of the arrival of the ironclad Almirante Cochrane to Caldera towed by the Itata transport due to lack of coal. In the cabinet session on the 25th, it was decided to ask Captain Simpson for explanations about the lack of coal on his ship.

The news of the capture of Rímac coincided with the questioning of the cabinet of ministers scheduled for July 31 and August 1. On the afternoon of the 31st, about a thousand men protested the misconduct of the war in the portico of the senate. In the night there were disturbances when the police tried to disperse the demonstrators, leaving 4 injured. In the interpellation session, the entire cabinet came out well, but the Minister of War and Navy, General Belisario Urrutia, who was offended by Vicuña Mackenna within the Chilean Senate, resigned his portfolio on August 2. There was also a ministerial crisis because the entire cabinet lost Antonio Varas, Minister of the Interior, who resigned on August 12.

The crisis led to the resignation of Rear Admiral Juan Williams Rebolledo to the General Command of the Squadron on August 4, of Eulogio Altamirano to the General Command of the Navy and Arms of Valparaíso on August 6, of Echaurren Huidobro to the position of General Quartermaster of the Army and Navy and of José Alfonso to the position of War Auditor of the Northern Operations Army on August 22.

A new one was formed, chaired by Domingo Santa María, who would occupy the portfolio of Minister of the Interior and had previously been Minister of Foreign Affairs. Santa María went to the Chamber of Deputies and Senators on August 21 and 22, respectively, to present his program. The new conduct of the war in Chile was decisive for its subsequent success in the naval campaign.
