= FM Erie-built =

Diesel locomotive

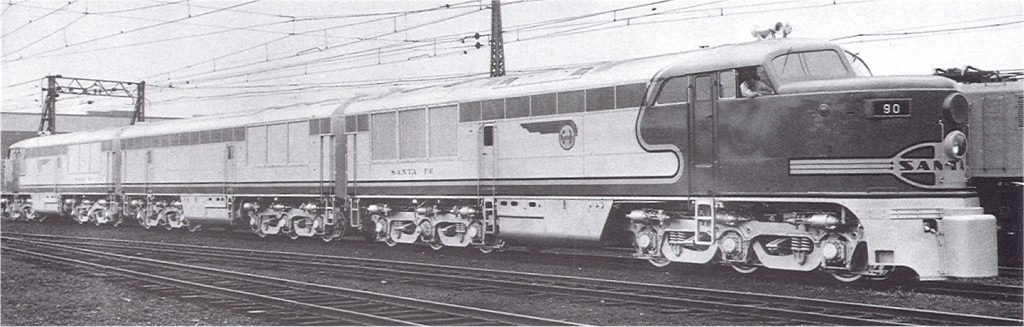
- The lone A-B-A set of Erie-builts ordered by the Atchison, Topeka and Santa Fe Railway, built in May 1947, hauled a number of its named passenger trains, among them the Super Chief and San Diegan.
Type and origin
- Power type: Diesel
- Builder: Fairbanks-Morse, at General Electric's Erie, Pennsylvania plant
- Model: Erie-built
- Build date: December 1945 to April 1949
- Total produced: 82 cab units, 29 boosters
Specifications
- Configuration
  - AAR: A1A-A1A
- Gauge: 4 ft 8 1/2 in (1,435 mm)
- Wheel diameter: 40 in (1,016 mm)
- Minimum curve: 210 (273 ft (83.21 m) radius
- Wheelbase: 51 ft 11 in (15.82 m)
- Length: 64 ft 10 in (19.76 m)
- Width: 10 ft 6 in (3.20 m)
- Height: 15 ft 7 in (4.75 m)
- Prime mover: FM 38D-8 1/8
- RPM range: 850 r.p.m. max
- Engine type: Opposed piston diesel
- Displacement: 10,369 cu in (169.92 L)
- Generator: FM GT-567
- Traction motors: (4) GE 746
- Cylinders: 10
- Cylinder size: 8.125 in × 10 in (206 mm × 254 mm)
- Train heating: Steam generator
- Train brakes: Air
Performance figures
- Power output: 2,000 hp (1.49 MW)
- Tractive effort: 54,850 lbf (244.0 kN))
Career
- Disposition: All scrapped

The Erie-built was the first streamlined, cab-equipped dual service diesel locomotive built by Fairbanks-Morse, introduced as direct competition to such models as the ALCO PA and FA and EMD FT. F-M lacked the space and staff to design and manufacture large road locomotives in their own plant at Beloit, Wisconsin, and was concerned that waiting to develop the necessary infrastructure would cause them to miss out on the market opportunity for large road locomotives. Engineering and assembly work was subcontracted out to General Electric, which produced the locomotives at its Erie, Pennsylvania, facility, thereby giving rise to the name "Erie-built."

At the time, diesel road power was sold as multi-unit locomotives. The Erie-Built used the 2,000 hp (1,500 kW), ten-cylinder version of F-M's Model 38D 8-1/8 opposed piston diesel engine, which had seen success as a submarine powerplant in World War II, as its prime mover. This allowed the Erie-Built to deliver a 6,000 hp (4,500 kW) locomotive consisting of only three units, versus four units for the 5,400 hp (4,000 kW) EMD FT and 6,000 hp (4,500 kW) ALCO FA. The Erie-Built used GE's model 746 traction motor, as used on the Great Northern Y-1 electric locomotive, making it the first diesel-electric locomotive to deliver 500 hp (370 kW) per axle. The locomotive was too heavy for a four-axle wheel arrangement, and had to be fitted with idler axles. The A1A-A1A wheel arrangement enabled the Erie-Built to meet axle-load limitations while maintaining the simplicity and lower cost of a four-motor transmission, though it meant the Erie-Built was more prone to wheelslip than the FT.

F-M retained the services of industrial designer Raymond Loewy to create a visually impressive car body for the Erie-built, similar to that of the EMD E-unit or ALCO DL-109. The initial windshield configuration utilized rectangular glass panes; units manufactured after March, 1947 received windshields with a curved upper contour.

The Union Pacific Railroad bought the first A-B-A set, which was delivered in December 1945. Subsequent engine troubles and a nine-month strike at the Beloit plant made it difficult to get repeat orders. The largest order came in 1947, when the Pennsylvania Railroad ordered 16 three-unit A-B-A sets. Kansas City Southern Railway ordered a four-unit, 8,000 hp (6,000 kW), A-B-B-A set to run long trains at faster speed. However, the resulting slack action on trains spanning several up-and-down gradients resulted in an excess of broken draft gear. KCS bought five more units to reconfigure its Erie-Builts to 6,000 hp (4,500 kW) A-B-A sets.

Most units rode on conventional General Steel Castings trucks, which looked similar to those used on the Alco PA but were actually a different design. This drove up the cost as it required new foundry patterns. GE designed a welded truck that could be fabricated at the Erie plant, and was fitted to a number of units for UP, KCS, and NYC. However, most customers preferred the cast steel truck, and the engineering cost, jigs and fixtures and necessity for a second inventory meant that the fabricated truck design did not save money

The Erie-Builts soon ran into problems with the prime mover that had not been experienced in Navy service. The 38D 8-1/8 engine as configured for the Erie-Builts had a Brake Mean Effective Pressure of 95.2 psi, as opposed to the 85 psi rating for Navy engines and 77 to 86.7 for the EMD 567 as used in the E7, FT and F3. Submarines gave the engines access to cool, sea-level air and could run heat exchangers with the surrounding seawater, but on Western railroads like UP, the engines were operating under load at high altitude, high temperature, and low humidity, and often in the wake of waste heat from leading locomotives. The OP engine had no head, and its exhaust ports were uncovered by the lower pistons. This resulted in excessive lower-piston temperatures, and under heavy load this led to piston failure, which could then cause cylinder liner damage and a possible crankcase explosion. F-M immediately attempted to address the problem but it was seven to eight years before a piston was developed that could stand up to railroad service.

Replacement of a single power assembly (cylinder liner and its two pistons) required moving the locomotive under a crane and removing (and later reinstalling) the locomotive's roof hatch, upper crankcase, upper caps, upper connecting rod caps, and upper crankshaft, making the operation much more time- and resource-intensive than a power assembly change on other engine types. Fairbanks-Morse learned that in shops that maintained multiple locomotive types, where the foreman was under pressure to repair as many locomotives as possible, repair of OP engines that required extensive disassembly was often delayed in favor of other types of locomotives that could be turned around more quickly.

Owing to the inferior reliability and higher maintenance costs, several Erie-Builts, including four of NYC's eight freight Erie-Builts and eight of KCS Erie-builts were repowered with an EMD 567 series diesel engine rated at 1,750 hp (1,300 kW). New York Central derated the OP engines in its six passenger Erie-Builts to 1,750 hp (1,300 kW) by 1957.

F-M ceased production of the Erie-Built in 1949, due largely to the difficulty of building it at a profit. It was determined that even if production was moved to Beloit, the high cost of items like the GE 746 traction motor (which was more expensive than the GE 752 used by the Alco PA), the unique cast and fabricate trucks, a secondary electrical power system for radiator fans and traction motor blowers, and a secondary cooling system for the lube oil (a Navy requirement), made the Erie-Builts too expensive to build.

82 cab-equipped lead A units and 29 cabless booster B units were built for American railroads between December 1945 and April 1949. Afterward, F-M continued to market dual service streamlined units under its Consolidated line of locomotives, more commonly referred to as "C-liners".

No FM Erie-Built units are known to survive today.

== CP Rail use ==
After their retirement, four former Pennsylvania Railroad Erie-built B unit hulks were sent to the Canadian Pacific Railway where they were incorporated into a quasi-portable CWR rail welding plant located at Smiths Falls, Ontario. These units were painted in a unique paint scheme almost identical to the Erie Lackawanna Railway's but with Canadian Pacific lettering; these units having been acquired immediately prior to the CPR adopting the red and white CP Rail multi-mark paint scheme. Around 1990, the CWR plant with the Erie-Built hulks were moved from Smiths Falls to a CP yard in the Transcona neighbourhood of Winnipeg, Manitoba in preparation for scrapping. Three sets of trucks from the Erie-Built hulks were salvaged and sent to Oregon, with two being placed under two truckless ex-D&H/ATSF Alco-GE PA-1s that were returned from Mexico, while an unused spare set was stored and eventually scrapped. One Erie-built CWR car did avoid the initial scrapping of the plant in 1994 but was later scrapped separately in 2010.

== Units produced ==
=== A units (cabs) ===
Image	Railroad	Quantity	Road numbers	Notes
	Atchison, Topeka and Santa Fe Railway	2	90, 90B	
	Chicago and North Western Railway subsidiary Chicago, St. Paul, Minneapolis and Omaha Railway	4	6001A, 6001B, 6002A, 6002B	
	Chicago, Milwaukee, St. Paul and Pacific Railroad	14	5A–9A, 5C–9C, 21A, 21B, 22A, 22B	Renumbered 5A–14A, 11B–14B
	Kansas City Southern Railway	6	60A, 60C, 61A, 61C, 62A, 62C	62A, 62C owned by subsidiary Louisiana and Arkansas Railway. All except 62C repowered by EMD.
	New York Central Railroad	12	4400–4405, 5000–5005	4400 series configured for passenger, 5000 series configured for freight. 5001, 5002, 5003 repowered with EMD 567 engines in 1957.
	Pennsylvania Railroad	36	9456A–9491A	
	Union Pacific Railroad	8	700–707	Renumbered 650–657 in 1955
	Total	82		

=== B units (cabless boosters) ===
Image	Railroad	Quantity	Road numbers	Notes
	Atchison, Topeka and Santa Fe Railway	1	90A	
	Chicago, Milwaukee, St. Paul and Pacific Railroad	6	5B–9B, 21C	21C renumbered 10B
	Kansas City Southern Railway	3	60B, 61B, 62B	62B owned by subsidiary Louisiana and Arkansas Railway. All repowered by EMD.
	New York Central Railroad	2	5100–5101	Both configured for freight. 5101 repowered with EMD 567 in 1957.
	Pennsylvania Railroad	12	9456B–9478B (even numbers only)	
	Union Pacific Railroad	5	700B, 702B–704B, 706B	Renumbered 650B, 652B–654B, 656B in 1955
	Total	29		

*Note: Union Pacific cab/booster/cab set 700 / 700B / 701 was originally Fairbanks-Morse demonstrator set 50-M-1A / 50-M-3B / 50-M-2A; became 981A / 983B / 982A in 1947, then 700 / 700B / 701 in 1948. Cab/booster sets 702 / 702B and 703 / 703B delivered as 984A / 986B and 985A / 987B.

== See also ==
- ALCO PA and FA, styling of which was inspired by the Erie-built
