= Williams Rebolledo =

Chilean admiral (1825–1910)

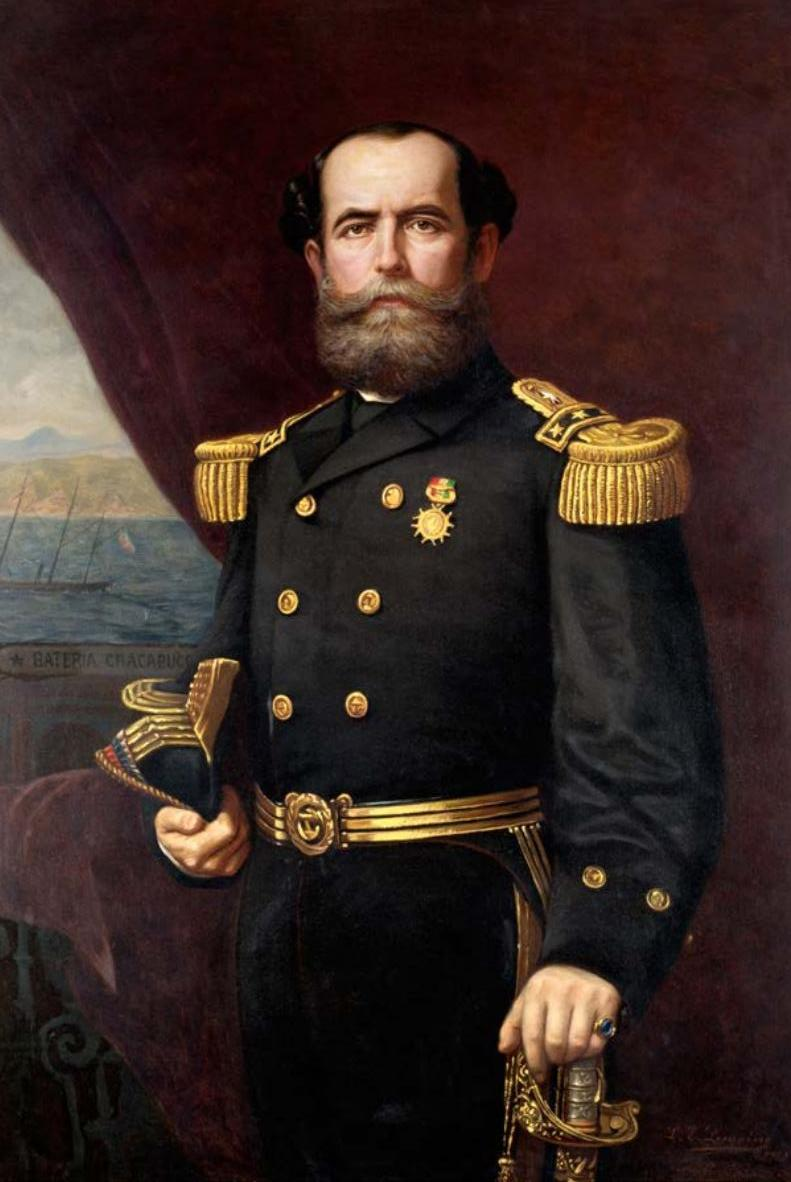
- Portrait of Vice admiral Juan Williams Rebolledo, oil on canvas by Manuel Antonio Caro in 1871
- Born: c. 1826; Curacaví, Chile
- Died: 24 June 1910 (aged 83–84); Santiago, Chile
- Burial place: Cemetery No. 1 of Valparaíso
- Spouse: Clara Noeglé
- Children: 5
- Father: John Williams Wilson
- Military career
- Allegiance: Chile
- Branch: Chilean Navy
- Service years: 1844–c. 1891
- Rank: Vice admiral
- Commands: Commander in chief of the Chilean squadron (1865–1874, 1878, 1879); Commander in chief of the Chilean-Peruvian squadron (1865–1866); Commander-in-chief of the Chilean Navy (1890–1891)
- Conflicts: 1851 Chilean revolution; Occupation of Araucanía; Chincha Islands War; Battle of Papudo; First raid on Chiloé; Second raid on Chiloé; War of the Pacific; Naval campaign of the War of the Pacific; Blockade of Iquique; Bombardment of Pisagua; Raid on Callao; Raids of Huáscar
- Other work: Political; Naval writer

Juan Williams Rebolledo (c. 1825 – 24 June 1910) was a Chilean rear admiral who was the organizer and commander-in-chief of the Chilean navy in 1879 at the beginning of the War of the Pacific. As a politician, he was elected from Valparaíso to the national Congress in 1867, and in 1873 he was elected as city councillor.

== Early life ==
Williams was the son of John Williams Wilson, an English-Chilean navy officer, and Micaela Rebolledo, born in Chile. From a seafaring family in Bristol, England, his father had immigrated to Chile at the age of 27 to serve in its recently formed navy under the command of Lord Cochrane. He reached the rank of commander.

The younger Williams joined the navy in 1844. After rising quite fast through the ranks, in 1855 he was appointed General Commandant of the Arsenals and Maritime Governor of Atacama, then the northernmost province of Chile.

== Chincha Islands War years ==
In 1865 Williams became commandant of the Esmeralda, which he sailed during the Chincha Islands War against Spain. During this war, he became a national hero after he captured the Spanish schooner Covadonga at the Naval Battle of Papudo on 26 November 1865. In the following years he trained all the officers who later took part in the War of the Pacific. He also directed the complete reorganization and modernization of the Chilean navy.

In 1867 Williams was elected a Deputy to the Chilean Congress, representing the port of Valparaíso. Six years later he became a city councillor for the same. In 1874 he was appointed General Commandant of the Navy.

== War of the Pacific ==
In 1879, at the beginning of the War of the Pacific against Peru and Bolivia, Williams was named commander-in-chief of the Chilean navy. The government plan was to attack the Peruvian navy immediately, as it was undergoing repairs in the port of Callao and was thus virtually defenseless. He opposed this course of action, insisting on a blockade of the southern Peruvian ports in order to impede the export of nitrates, then the main source of revenue for the Peruvian government. This gave Peru more time for its war preparations. By the time Williams decided that the blockade was not working fast enough, the Peruvian navy was ready and at sea.

At the end of April 1879, Williams finally decided to attack Callao. He left behind his two oldest and weakest ships, Esmeralda and Covadonga, to blockade the port of Iquique, since they could not keep up with the rest of the fleet. They were put into battle against the Peruvian navy's first division on May 21 during the naval battles of Iquique and Punta Gruesa. Although the Esmeralda was lost, the triumph of the Covadonga brought him praise. Historians have noted that his indecision had caused severe problems and his war plans generally failed.

At the end, his constant political infighting with Rafael Sotomayor, Chilean minister of war, and with General Justo Arteaga, Commander-in-Chief of the Army, caused him to lose important support within the administration. After he failed to capture the Huascar in a naval action, he resigned his position in August 1879, and was replaced by Captain Galvarino Riveros.

== Later life ==
After being appointed to several positions within the navy, in 1890 he was promoted to Commander General. During the rebellion of the Chilean Navy that marked the start of the 1891 Chilean Civil War, he resigned and remained loyal to President José Manuel Balmaceda.

Two years before his death he was promoted by a special act of the Chilean Congress to Rear-Admiral. He died in Santiago on 24 June 1910.

Military offices
Preceded by Luis Uribe	Navy General Commander; 1890-1891	Succeeded by Oscar Viel
