= Raids of Huáscar =

- Part of the Naval campaign of the War of the Pacific
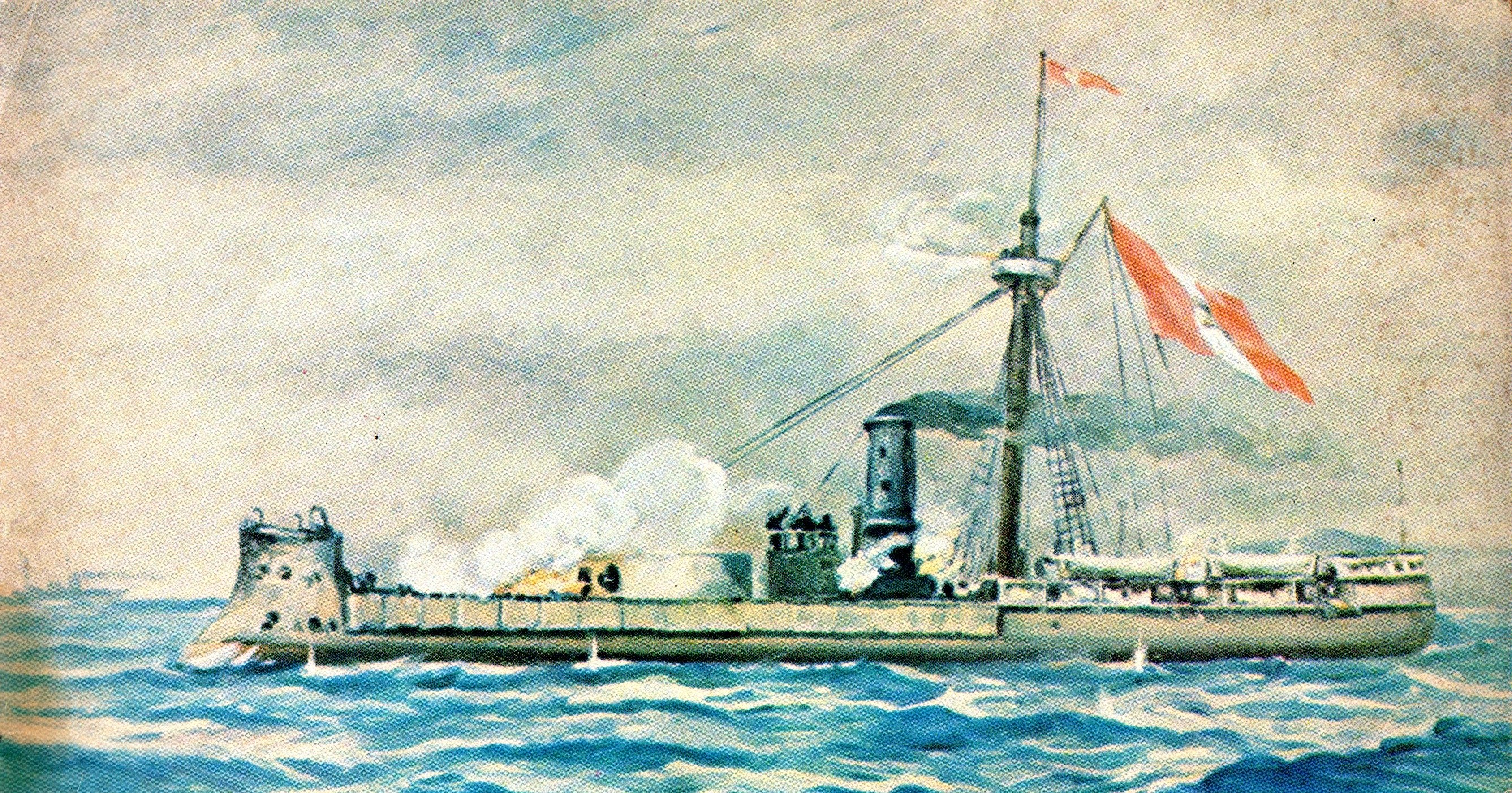
- The Huáscar in navigation
Date	May 16, 1879 – October 8, 1879
Location	Coasts of Bolivia, Chile, and Peru
Result	Chilean victory

Belligerents
Peru	Chile

Commanders and leaders
Miguel Grau †; A. García y García	Juan Rebolledo; Galvarino Cárdenas; Juan José Latorre

The Raids of the Huáscar were a series of raids that occurred by the Peruvian ironclad Huáscar under the command of Miguel Grau Seminario during the War of the Pacific. The actions kept the Chilean government in check for nearly five months which ended after the Battle of Angamos.

== Background ==
Although the Huáscar was seaworthy at the start of the war, she found her guns dismounted and her crew untrained.

Since 1878, the commander of the Huáscar was the frigate captain Gregorio Pérez. On March 24, 1879, Miguel Grau, who was a deputy of the Paita Province, was appointed commander of the Huáscar, assuming command of the ship on March 28. On May 10, 1879, 3 naval divisions were formed. The 1st Division, under the command of Captain Miguel Grau, was made up of the Huáscar, the ironclad Independencia, and the Chalaco.

== Departure from Callao ==
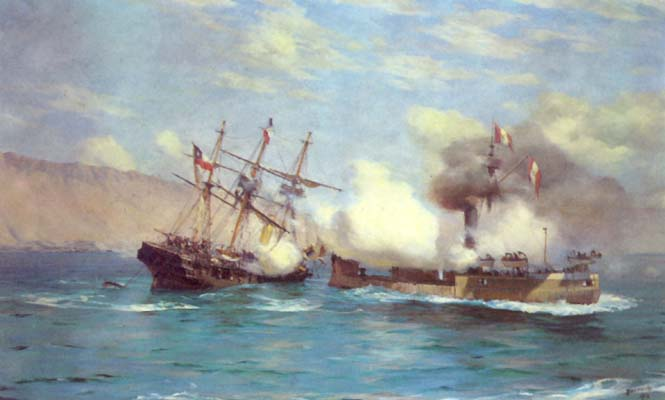
The Battle of Iquique was the first naval action of the Huáscar in the war.

On May 16, 1879, the Huáscar sailed from Callao together with the Independencia, escorting the transports Chalaco, Limeña, Oroya and the monitors Manco Cápac and Atahualpa, but a few hours later they returned to Callao, because the boilers of the monitors were leaking. They then left the convoy again on May 16 at midnight, but this time without the monitors. La Limeña is commissioned to Pacocha, where she arrives on the 19th, while the rest of the convoy arrives at Arica on the night of May 20, when Prado learns that the blockade of Iquique is sustained only by two old corvettes and that transports with 2,500 men which had left Valparaíso for Antofagasta. Immediately, President Mariano Ignacio Prado, who had traveled on the Oroya, ordered the Huáscar and the Independencia to go to the port of Iquique to lift the blockade maintained by ships from the Chilean squad. On May 21, after a combat of more than three hours, the Huáscar sunk the Esmeralda in the Battle of Iquique, thus lifting the blockade of the port. This tactical victory had a high cost since, on the same day, the frigate Independencia was sunk during the Battle of Punta Gruesa.

By order of President Prado, on May 24 at 5:30 am, the Huáscar set sail from Iquique to Antofagasta. On the 25th, at 6:45 am, he began to pursue a steamer for 4 hours which turned out to be the Itata, which was heading to Tocopilla to tow the schooner Covadonga to Antofagasta but the chase was to no avail. Then, the Huáscar captured the Peruvian pailebot Recuperado, which had been captured by the Esmeralda and was headed for Antofagasta, which she set on fire, saving her crew earlier; She anchored in Mejillones, where 7 boats and the schooner Clorinda were destroyed. On the 26th at 8:30 am, he spotted the transport Rímac leaving Antofagasta, which he gave a futile chase for 2 hours; she returned to the port and saw the Chilean steamer Itata, which was heading north and which she also gave an unsuccessful 2-hour chase but then the First Battle of Antofagasta took place. She returned to port on the morning of the 27th and cut the submarine cable. On the 28th she continued north and at 7 am, she recovered the schooner Coqueta, captured by the Esmeralda days before, and sent her to Arica. In Cobija, she destroyed the 6 boats that were there and set sail to the west, capturing at 2 pm the boat Emilia which had used the Nicaraguan flag, loaded with metals bound for Lota and who, under the command of 1st Lieutenant Melitón Rodríguez, traveled to Callao.

The Huáscar returned to Iquique to disembark the frigate captain Ramón Freyre, who had been injured by shrapnel in the legs, along with the senior surgeon Santiago Távara, who gave him medical treatment. He arrived at that port at dusk on the 29th and they agreed that the Huáscar would spend the night on the high seas to return to port in daylight to pick up the disembarked and receive new orders. But when the Huáscar returned to Iquique, she sighted the ironclads Blanco Encalada and Almirante Cochrane, the corvette Abtao and the gunboat Magallanes at the entrance to the port on May 30. She was pursued by the Blanco Encalada and the Magallanes from 7 am to 3 pm but the Almirante Cochrane and the Abtao were left behind due to lack of coal, suspending the pursuit because the Blanco Encalada had only 15 tons of coal and the Magallanes for two days of cooking. While the Huáscar headed for Pacocha, at 4:45 p.m., in the vicinity of Arica, he sighted a steamer, approaching both to recognize each other and at 6:20 p.m., the Huáscar began his pursuit until 7:50 p.m, in which he gave up on the pursuit.

The Huáscar continued to Pacocha, where it loaded coal on May 31, after which it traveled to Arica, anchoring on June 1 at 10:30 a.m. On June 2 at 8 a.m., it was in Pisagua, where the doctor Távara and Antonio Cucalón, who traveled overland from Iquique. There he received a telegram from Iquique from President Prado, to locate the Chilean corvettes O'Higgins and Chacabuco on the high seas near Iquique.

In the early hours of June 3, between Huanillos and Punta Lobos, near Iquique, Huáscar's lookout spotted smoke on the port side. Grau confused the fumes with those of the corvettes Chacabuco and O'Higgins, he was slow to recognize the Blanco Encalada due to the fog. At 6:15 a.m., the fog lifted and with the Blanco Encalada at a distance of 8 km, the Huáscar turned west and then towards Arica, trying to elude the pursuit at full speed. At 11:30 am the distance between the Blanco Encalada and the Huáscar was 4,700 meters, while the Magallanes was delayed. To relieve the Huáscar, Grau ordered the starboard feluccas to be thrown into the sea. Both irocnlads did not make more than 9 kilometers. At noon, the Blanco Encalada opened fire on the Huáscar. In order to sustain their rate of fire, the Chilean armor constantly changed from one band to another. Grau stayed on the northwest course and soon got the upper hand on the Chilean ironclad. At that time, the young Antonio Cucalón slipped from the deck of the Huáscar, who was a passenger and whose fall into the sea no one saw, since then all those who travel in an indefinite condition have been nicknamed "cucalones". The pursuit continued until midnight and the Huáscar was able to enter Arica. As soon as they arrived in Pisagua, they embarked all the crew members who remained in Iquique and who had made the trip on horseback all day and the previous night, and once again the Huáscar put to sea with a northerly bow, sailing 15 miles from the coast.

The Huáscar entered Callao on June 7 and remained in maintenance for almost a month. Since the start of the commission on May 16, it was planned that all ironclads would return to Callao in June for maintenance. Grau took advantage of his stay in Callao to recruit experienced artillerymen of English and Greek origin.

== First raid ==
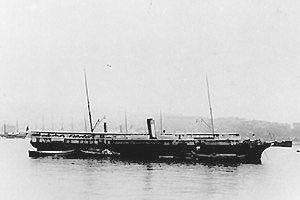
The Chilean transport Rímac was captured in a joint action between the corvette Unión and the ironclad Huáscar.

The Huáscar sailed from Callao for Arica on July 6, arriving on the 8th and sailing the next day for Iquique. There, the Third Battle of Iquique began between the Huáscar and the Magallanes at dawn on the 10th, after which she returned to Arica.

President Prado received in Tacna the news of the bombing of Iquique. At 2 am on July 17, General Prado conferred with the Miguel Grau and Aurelio García y García, to make a raid on Antofagasta and capture the any Chilean transports in sight. Both Peruvian and Chilean ships, anchored in the ports of operations, used to go to sea at night, returning the next morning, so they planned to attack or capture a transport off Antofagasta. The corvette Unión and the Huáscar sailed south, away from the coast, under the assumption that the 2 Chilean armored vehicles were in Iquique, which turned out to be false because the Almirante Cochrane sailed to Antofagasta. The two ships had agreed to meet off the coast of Mejillones.

In the early hours of July 18, the Union sighted the Huáscar off Mejillones, which had intercepted the British sailing ship Lady de Vére sailing to Liverpool. Grau was informed through this sailboat that 3 transports with troops and supplies from Valparaíso were waiting in Antofagasta. They sailed together all morning and the Huáscar was sighted by a steamer sailing in the opposite direction at 1 pm. The Unión identified it as a warship sailing to Mejillones and began pursuit. At first it was believed that it was the corvette Abtao. The unknown ship entered the Mejillones roadstead and the Unión stood in front of it, offering one of its bands ready to unload its artillery: the colors of France slowly rose on the unidentified warship. The Huáscar entered at 4 pm and the ship was identified as the French cruiser Hugon, from Valparaíso. According to the reports available to Commander Grau, the telegraph from Antofagasta to Mejillones had been laid, so it was assumed that upon entering the port, the surprise incursion had ended. The Peruvian ships left Mejillones at 8:00 p.m. on the 18th, while at 10 p.m., the news of the presence of Huáscar in Mejillones was received in Antofagasta.

On July 19 at 8 am, off Antofagasta, the Huáscar and the Union captured the frigate Adelaida Rojas, which had a Nicaraguan flag but was a Chilean ship. The ship, loaded with 1,700 tons of coal, heads to Callao as a prey.

On July 20 at 7:30 am, off Chañaral, the Huáscar captures the brig Saucy Jack loaded with copper and sent it to Callao. In Chañaral, the Huáscar sets fire to 10 boats and leaves another 2 stranded, while the Unión arrived in Caldera at 2 pm

On July 21, the Huáscar arrives at Huasco and destroys the 4 boats present. The Unión was anchored at 6:30 a.m. on the 21st in Carrizal Bajo, set fire to 17 boats and rendezvoused with Huáscar, returning north at 6 p.m.

The Peruvian ships returned to Chañaral on July 22 at 9:50 a.m. While the Unión sails to the Pan de Azúcar cove, the Huáscar captured the Adriana Lucía, loaded with metals, which was also illegally flying the Nicaraguan flag. The Huáscar left Chañaral at 2:30 pm with the boat, which sent it to Callao. The Unión entered Pan de Azúcar at 12 noon, destroyed 5 boats and went to join the Huáscar.

On July 23, the Huáscar together with the Unión and captured the Rímac transport, returning with the other ships to Arica on the 25th.

== Second raid ==
Political Cartoons of the Raids of Huáscar

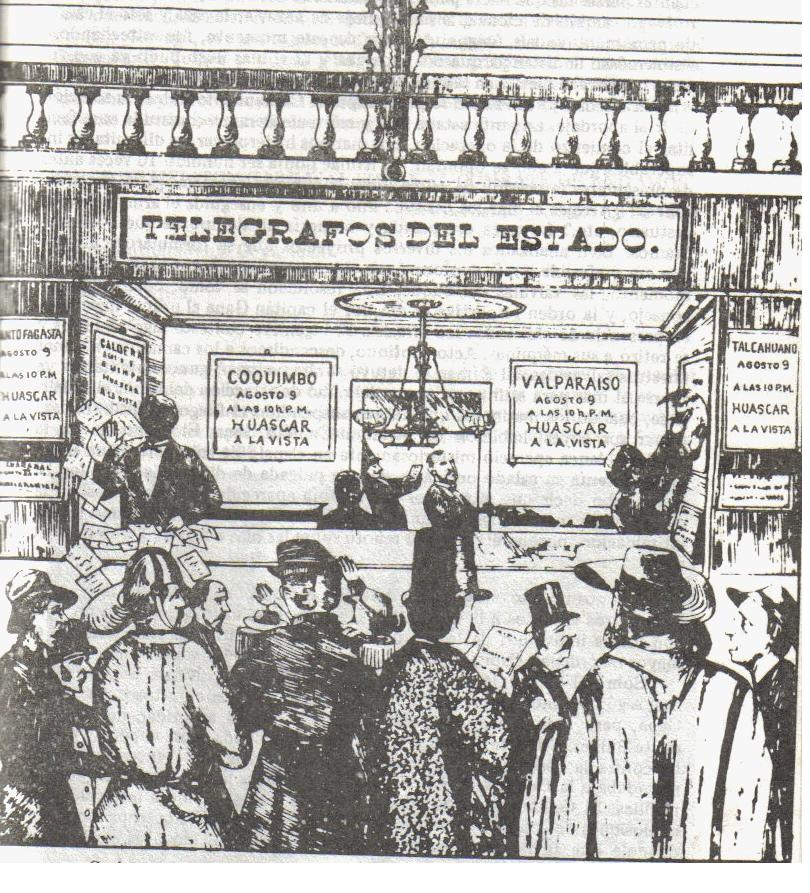
On the left, a Peruvian caricature mocks the Chilean fears that they see the Huáscar in different Chilean ports on the same day at the same time.

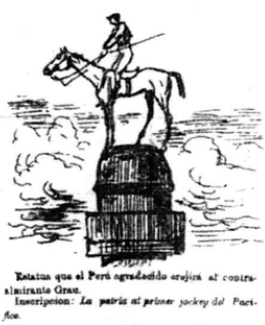
A Chilean caricature, on the right, proposes to build a tribute statue to Grau for being the first jockey in Peru, for the speed with which he flees from the Chilean squad.

The Huáscar was assigned to sink the ironclad Almirante Cochrane, which, according to intelligence reports, had its boilers in terrible condition however this wasn't true. On August 1 at 00:30 am, the Huáscar set sail from Arica together with the Rímac, to attack the Almirante Cochrane, which was said to be in Caldera.

On the high seas, a storm broke out that forced the Peruvian ships to further reduce their speed, between 3.5 and 6 knots, to weather the storm. The Rímac broke the eccentrics of its machines in the early hours of August 3 and they had to be stopped for temporary repair and it was sent by Grau to Callao, but previously, it transferred coal to the Huáscar, being the first documented coal replenishment at sea in naval warfare, although with the ongoing maintenance of the Rímac, The Huáscar continued alone.

On August 4, the Huáscar intercepted the German steamer Ibis of the Kosmos Company that was making the run between Valparaíso and Callao. From the Ibis it was reported that the Chilean ironclad was in Coquimbo. Grau decided to look for it along the Chilean coast and set sail for Caldera, with a speed between 4 and 7 knots. In order not to be seen, a boat was sent to this port with Lieutenant Fermín Diez Canseco and he was informed that only the Lamar was at the port.

Grau decided to venture further south in his search for the Chilean ship. On August 5, another storm broke out, worse than the previous one, reducing the speed between 1.5 and 6 knots. The Huáscar suffered damage that would prevent it from successfully facing a new combat and it was necessary to return to the north. The Peruvian commander ordered a return to Caldera in search of the Lamar transport. On August 6, at 10:30 p.m., the Huáscar re-entered the port of Caldera and remained in sight of the port forts. They found the PSNC steamer Valdivia with the British vice-consul on board and the presence of the Lamar was confirmed in the port; however, the search, which lasted until 11:30 pm, was unsuccessful and the Huáscar withdrew from the port.

At 1:45 pm on August 7, the Huáscar entered the new port of Taltal; in this port they recognized the German ships Annie Brener and Meteore and the British ships of Adelina B., Guatemalan and Coquimbo. Grau ordered 2nd Lieutenant Enrique Palacios to disembark to notify the governor of Taltal of the Huáscar's intention to sink all the Chilean ships so that their crews could be saved. Upon the return of Lieutenant Palacios, Grau learned of the resignation of Rear Admiral Juan Williams Rebolledoto, the General Commander of the Chilean squad. 2nd Lieutenant Gervasio Santillana took the Chilean boats to the side of the Huáscar for its destruction, but 2 smokes appeared on the horizon. At 4:00 pm they recognized the ironclad Blanco Encalada and an unknown transport, which turned out to be the Itata which enforced machinery. The Huáscar began to escape heading southwest, until taking advantage of the darkness of the night, she headed south and then, heading east, to sail close to the coast and sail north, losing sight of them at midnight.

On August 8 at 6 pm, the Huáscar entered Cobija and then entered Tocopilla at 11 pm, without further incident. On August 9 at 3 pm, the Huáscar entered Iquique. She entered Arica on August 10 at 2 pm, escorting the transport Oroya from Iquique.

== Third raid ==
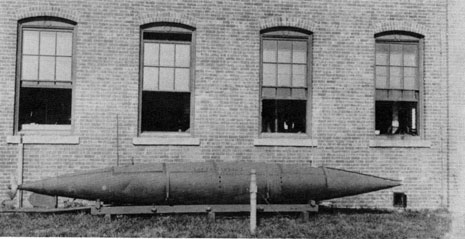
Lay styled torpedo, similar to the one used by the Huáscar without success.

President Prado gave Grau the mission of torpedoing the Chilean armored vehicle Blanco Encalada in Antofagasta. If it were possible to sink the Blanco Encalada, the transport Oroya, which was traveling in convoy with the Huáscar, would go to Arica to tow the monitor Manco Cápac to Antofagasta and the 3 assembled ships would order the surrender of the Chilean Army. Frigate Ensign Ricardo Herrera, who was traveling incognito on the PSNC steamer Ilo, would make a sketch of the Blanco Encalada's location in Antofagasta and had to be picked up south of Antofagasta. President Prado decided to send Huáscar to Antofagasta after receiving 3 pieces of news: the cleaning of the Blanco Encalada funds in Antofagasta, the information of an upcoming Chilean invasion since the Herreshoff torpedo boat wouldn't arrive soon for Peru. For this, the Huáscar would use 2 Lay torpedoes that were ready in Iquique, as there was one more unprepared in Iquique and 7 more in Callao. On August 22 at 3:30 am, the Huáscar left Arica in convoy with the Oroya and at 8:30 pm, was anchored at Iquique, picked up the two Lay torpedoes and embarked Peruvian and American engineers Felipe Arancibia and Stephen Chester to operate them. The torpedoes were hoisted aboard on the stern davits, replacing the Huáscar's feluccas, and the Peruvian vessels set sail for Antofagasta on August 23 at 1:45 p.m.

At 3 p.m. on August 24, the Huáscar and Oroya were at Punta Jara, south of Antofagasta, awaiting for the steamer Ilo. At 6 pm, the Ilo was intercepted and Frigate Lieutenant Ricardo Herrera reported that the gunboat Magallanes, the corvette Abtao and the transports Limarí and Package de Maule were in Antofagasta, while the whereabouts of the ironclad Blanco Encalada were unknown. Grau ordered the Oroya to remain at the mouth of the port and began its entry into the port of Antofagasta and advanced until it was positioned, at 3 am on the 25th, 300 to 400 meters from the Abtao and the Magallanes. However they couldn't use the spur because of the proximity of the breakers and the Lay torpedoes would be used. The Lay torpedo, which was launched on Abtao from the port bow, missed because her propeller became entangled with the line to keep it in position. The current carried the torpedo back to the Huáscar and it was able to collide and sink the Peruvian ship, but 2nd Lieutenant Fermín Diez Canseco jumped into the sea, diverting its trajectory, and Lieutenant Carlos de los Heros and Marine candidate Manuel Elías Bonnemaison went out in a boat to pick up the torpedo. At 7:35 am the boat and the torpedo were hoisted off Antofagasta, so Grau ordered a withdrawal from the port.

The Huáscar and the Oroya arrived in Taltal on August 26, they took 9 lachas, of which 6 were towed by the Oroya and the others destroyed along with a steam launch, after which the Oroya headed for Arica, where it arrived on the 29th, having abandoned the 6 launches it was towing due to bad weather. On the 27th, the Huáscar was in the coves of Blanco Encalada and Cobre, south of Antofagasta, entering the port again at 11:00 am on the 28th to cut the submarine cable and the Second Battle of Antofagasta beginning hours later. The Huascar returned to Arica, arriving on August 31, where Grau was promoted to Rear Admiral.

== Final Raid ==
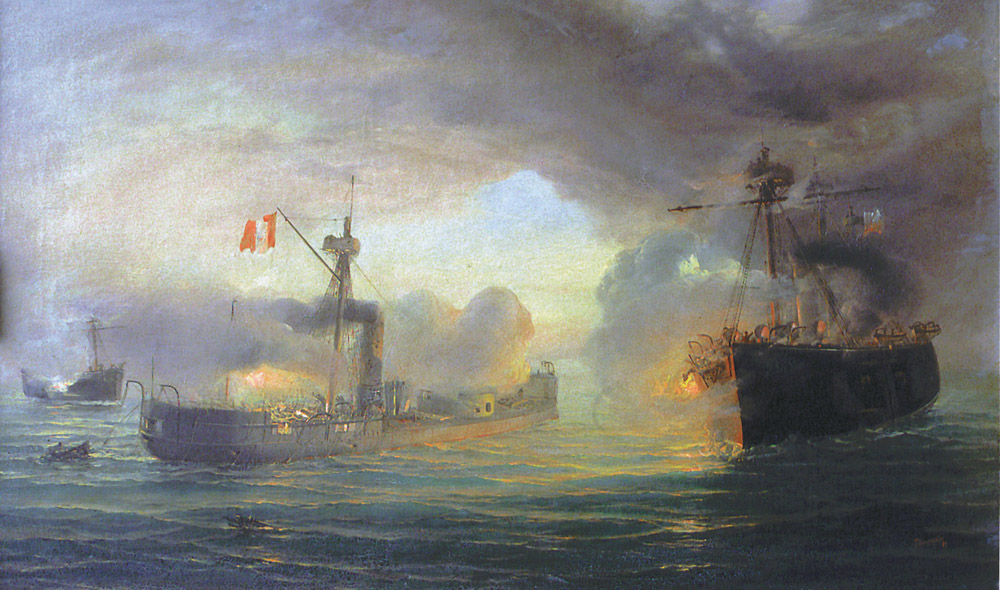
The Battle of Angamos by Thomas Somerscales.

The Huáscar was anchored in Arica in almost all of September 1879. It escorted the Chalaco to carry troops and supplies from Arica to Iquique between September 1 and 4, between 23 and 24 it escorted it to carry troops from Pacocha to Arica and between 27 and 28, again escorts it to Iquique.

On the 29th, the Chalaco set sail from Arica in the direction of Mollendo, escorted by the Huáscar and at 10:30 pm, meets the Rímac escorted by the Unión which was sailing towards Arica. The Huáscar leaves the Chalaco and travels with the convoy to Arica where they anchor at 3 am on the 30th. Grau goes ashore where he receives instructions from President Prado for his last expedition to the south. The instructions were: the convoy made up of the Huáscar, the Unión and the Rímac sail to Pisagua to disembark officers and packages belonging to the Bolivian Army, head for Iquique, where the Rímac would disembark the Exploratory Division of the Peruvian army, with 1,500 seats, and ship wood to return to Arica. While the Huáscar and the Unión, both under the command of Grau, would travel to Tocopilla where they would arrive at night to sink one of the Chilean ironclads or ship if it were stationed there, for which they would use a Lay torpedo, operated by the American engineer G. Haight, and if it were not possible for the clarity of the night, Grau would commit all possible hostilities between Tocopilla and Coquimbo leaving the ships at risk under his command.

On September 30 at 4:10 a.m., the Huáscar, the Unión, and the Rímac sailed south, arriving in Iquique at 4:00 p.m. and disembarking the Exploratory Division. On October 1 at 3:10 am, the Iquique convoy sailed north, but at 5:30 am, the Huáscar and the Unión headed west and then south, while the Rímac continued to Arica, making scale in Pisagua. Due to the clarity of the night, since there was a full moon until October 4, the convoy did not arrive in Tocopilla, but instead continued south. The convoy arrived at Sarco, a cove south of Huasco on 11 am on October 4. The fleet then seized the sailboat Coquimbo which it was sent to Callao and the Huáscar and the Unión would continue south. The Huáscar and the Unión arrived in Coquimbo at 1:30 a.m. on the 5th, en route to Tongoy at 3:15 a.m., where they landed at 11:00 a.m. At Tongoy, the Huáscar repaired a steam valve facing the bay until 5 pm, then sailed north along with the Unión. At 9 am on the 7th, the Huáscar stopped 60 miles from the coast to repair a breakdown in his engines, taking advantage of the time to receive 25 tons of coal from the Unión, which was visited by Rear Admiral Grau. At 1:10 pm the trip to the north was resumed and at 1:00 am on the 8th, the Huáscar entered the Bay of Antofagasta. Hours later, the Battle of Angamos took place, where the Huáscar was finally captured by the Chilean squadron.

== Aftermath ==
Although the fleets succeeded in their tasks at the respective ports (bombardment, capture and sinking of boats), the public reception of the events were different.

Initially, after the Chilean attacks, which were carried out before those of the Huáscar, popular demonstrations in Peru demanded that the government send the squad to avenge the wrongs. The government rejected the demands, stating that the Peruvian ships were in no condition to fight. and used them to toughen the expulsion order for Chilean workers and their families.

Jorge Basadre writes about the Huáscar and its attacks in Chile:

It was an inferior ship to any of the enemy ironclads, and yet, it kept up the fight as master of the sea. With him, Peru showed audacity, an initial attack, a command over events yet danger in the attack. With him he glimpsed an illusion of victory.

The Chilean incursions weren't well received either, neither in Chile nor outside the country. Gonzalo Bulnes wrote after the account of the events that occurred in April, in Guanillos, Pabellón de Pica and Pisagua:

It was a sad war. The balance of April was reduced to this: a powerful squad condemned to carry out secondary operations [...] For Peru the economic consequences were devastating but the political use was positive. For Chile the economic consequences were minor but the political consequences were devastating.

American naval strategist Alfred Mahan, who was at Callao during the war, wrote in his famous work The Influence of Sea Power upon History, 1660-1783.:

The control of the sea, even if it is effective, does not imply that the enemy's small ships or small squadrons cannot slip out of the ports, cross the sea following more or less frequented routes, disembark and devastate some undefended point of an extensive coastline and enter blocked ports. On the contrary, History shows that such evasions are always possible, up to a certain point, for the weaker belligerent, no matter how great the inequality of forces.
