= Óscar Viel y Toro =

Chilean naval officer (1832–1892)

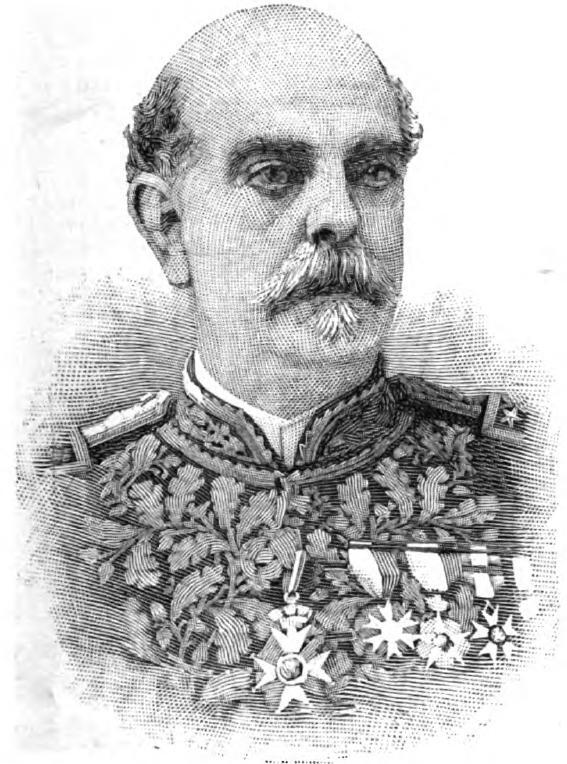
- 1891 portrait of Óscar Viel y Toro.
- Born: c. 1837; Santiago, Chile
- Died: 1 September 1892; Paris, France
- Spouse: Manuela Cavero Núñez
- Children: Óscar Viel Cavero, Teresa Viel Cavero
- Military career
- Allegiance: Chile
- Branch: Chilean Navy
- Service years: 1854–1891
- Rank: Counter admiral
- Conflicts: Chincha Islands War War of the Pacific: Blockade of Iquique

Óscar Viel y Toro (Note: In this Chilean name, the first or paternal surname is Viel and the second or maternal family name is Toro.) (c. 1837 – 1 September 1892) was a Chilean navy officer. From 1867 to 1874 he was governor of Punta Arenas in the Straits of Magellan.

He died in exile in Paris on 1 September 1892.
