= Pisagua internment camp =

Concentration camp in Pisagua, Chile 1927–1931, 1939-1947, 1973-1974

- Internment camp used many times in Chilean history
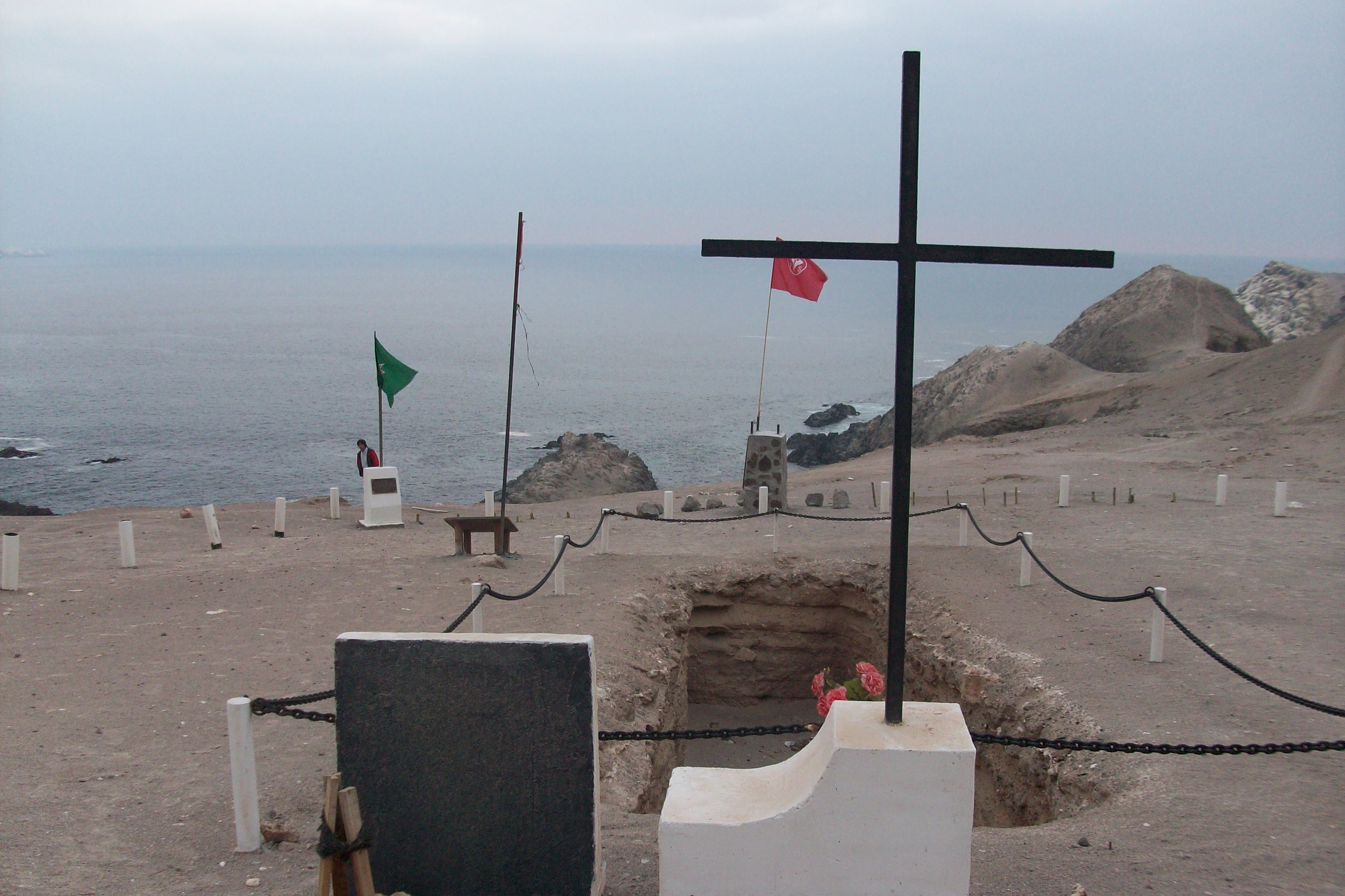
- The Pisagua Memorial in 2007

- Location within Chile
- Coordinates: 19°35′48″S 70°12′44″W
- Location: Pisagua
- Built by: Chilean government
- Operated by: Chilean government
- Operational: 1927-1931; 1939-1947; 1973-1974
- Number of inmates: 2500 people (during the 1973-1974 biennium)
- Killed: 30 people (during the 1973-1974 biennium)

The Pisagua internment camp (Spanish: Campamento de Prisioneros de Pisagua) was a concentration camp in Pisagua, Chile.

== History ==
An isolated location in northern Chile, Pisagua was used as a detention site for male homosexuals under the military dictatorship of General Carlos Ibáñez del Campo in 1927-1931.

From 1943 to 1945, Pisagua became the site of wartime internment for citizens of enemy nations when Chile entered World War II on the Allied side. The complex was turned into a concentration camp for Chilean socialists, communists and anarchists under President Gabriel González Videla in 1947-1948. Chilean Army Captain Augusto Pinochet was appointed to run the Pisagua camp in January 1948.

== Pinochet's dictatorship to present ==
When General Pinochet himself seized power in September 1973, the site again became a political detention center.

It's been alleged that one of the torturers of this camp was Walter Rauff, a mid-ranking SS commander in Nazi Germany and the man responsible for creating the mobile gassing vans. He escaped to Ecuador after the war, and later found refuge in Chile with Germans willing to hide him. Under Pinochet's military dictatorship, Rauff may have served as an advisor to the Chilean secret police, DINA. Its believed he also had ties with the Nazi loyalist Colonia Dignidad which had footholds throughout South America.

In the 1990s, the Pisagua court case would draw further scrutiny to the prison camp when a claim of illegal burial was presented by the Chilean Vicariate of Solidarity on 31 May 1990. A mass grave was discovered in June 1990 and was found to contain 20 bodies inside. These would be later linked to prisoners and missing persons (desaparecidos) executed at the camp.

== Identified persons from mass grave (June 6, 1990) ==
Order of Discovery	Name
1	Manuel Eduardo Sanhueza Mellado
2	Nicolas Chanez Chanez
3	Tomas Orlando Cabello Cabello
4	Luis Manriquez Wilde
5	Juan Orlando Rojas Osega
6	Hugo Tomas Martinez Guillen
7	Alberto Amador Yañez Carvajal
8	Luis Alberto Toro Castillo
9	Nelson Jose Marquez Agusto
10	German Elidio Palominos Lamas
11	Juan Apolinario Mamani Garcia
12	Jose Rufino Cordova Croxatto
13	Juan Valencia Hinojosa
14	Julio Cesar Cabezas Gacitua
15	Mario Morris Barrios
16	Humberto Lizardo Flores
17	Luis Alberto Lizardi Lizardi
18	Marcelo Omar Guzman Fuentes
19	Juan Efrain Calderon Villalon
20	*Not confirmed by source

== See also ==
- The Pisagua Court Case
