= Blockade of Iquique =

- Part of the War of the Pacific
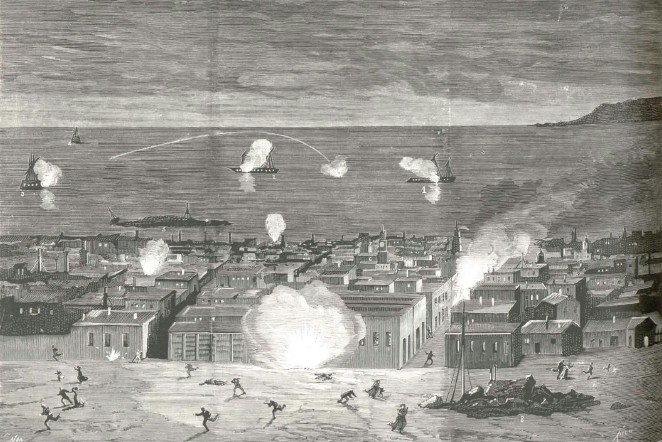
- Iquique, Peru, on July 16, 1879. Bombardment by the Chilean navy.
Date	April 5, 1879 – May 21, 1879; June 1, 1879 – August 2, 1879
Location	Iquique, Peru 20°13′S 70°9′W
Result	Peruvian victory

Belligerents
Chile	Peru

Commanders and leaders
(Chile) Juan Williams Rebolledo	(Peru) Miguel Grau

Strength
1 schooner 1 corvette	2 ironclads

Casualties and losses
Unknown	Unknown

The Blockade of Iquique was a military operation that occurred during the War of the Pacific. Once war was declared by Chile upon Peru on Saturday, April 5, 1879, the first Chilean naval action for the War of the Pacific was set in motion. The plan was to block the Peruvian port of Iquique the same day the declaration of war was made. The first phase of the blockade ended on May 21, 1879, after the clashes between the Peruvian ships Huascar and Independencia versus the Chilean ships Esmeralda and Covadonga.

The second phase of the blockade was resumed on June 1, and lasted until August 2, 1879, at which time Juan Williams Rebolledo had to resign for failing to succeed in its actions because of the excursions of the Huascar of Peruvian Admiral Miguel Grau against Chilean vessels.
