= Pisagua, Chile =

Chilean town

Coordinates: 19°36′S 70°13′W

Pisagua
- Town
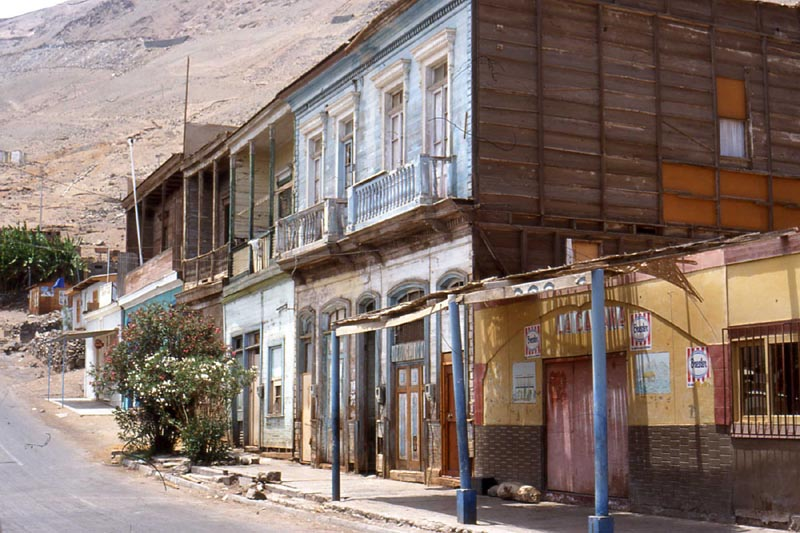
- Abandoned houses in Pisagua
- Interactive map of Pisagua
- Country: Chile
- Region: Tarapacá
- Province: Tamarugal
- Commune: Huara
- Elevation: 4 m (13 ft)

Population (2002)
  - Total: 260
- Demonym: pisagüino
- Time zone: UTC-4 (CLT)
  - Summer (DST): UTC-3 (CLST)
- Area code: (+56) 5

Pisagua is a town and fishing village in Huara, a commune of Tarapacá Region, Chile. In 2002, its population was numbered at 260 people. In 2007, the commune of Huaura was incorporated into the newly created Tamarugal Province.

Once inhabited by the Chango people, the settlement was originally established by locals in what was then the Viceroyalty of Peru. Destroyed by an earthquake in 1828, it was rebuilt further south but again destroyed by another earthquake and tsunami in 1868. The region was conquered by Chile during the War of the Pacific, after which it served as an important destination for saltpeter exports in the region until the 1930s. Following this period, the town's economy became dependent on fishing, also hosting an internment camp that operated from 1927 to 1974. It was again damaged by an earthquake in 2014, with no recorded fatalities.

== Early history ==
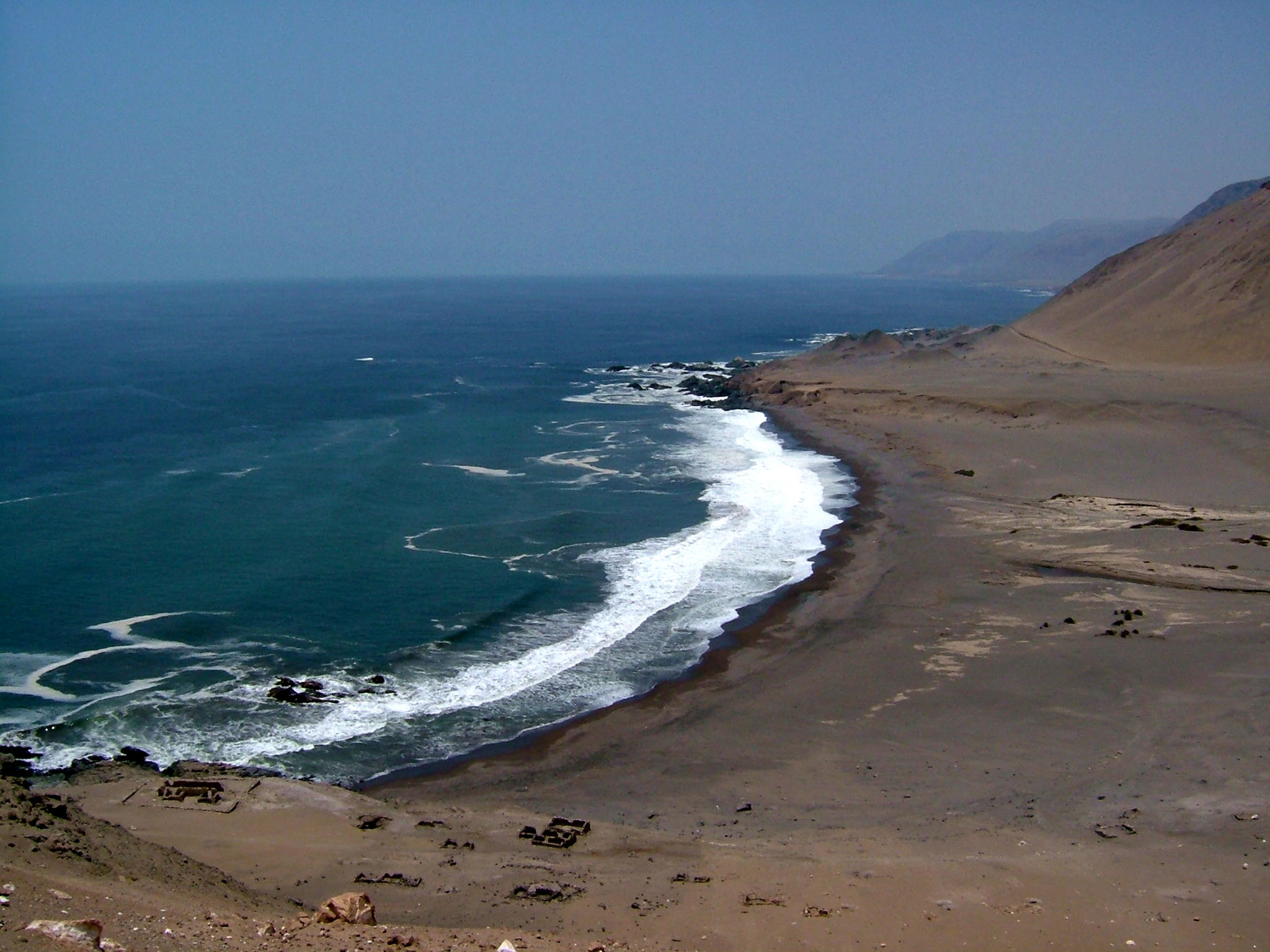
Mouth of Quebrada Tiliviche and (bottom) the ruins of Pisagua Viejo

According to Francisco Riso Patrón, and stated in Diccionario Geográfico de las Provincias de Tacna y Tarapacá, the name Pisagua has a quechua origin, meaning "place of scarce water": Pis - scarce, agua - water.

Pisagua was founded in 1611 after an edict by the Viceroy of Peru which established a base from which it could be possible to stem the illegal traffic of gold and silver flowing from the important mines of Potosí and Oruro, in the Highlands of the "Audiencia of Charcas", to the British and Dutch pirates operating in the Corregimiento de Arica. Thus, Pisagua became a minor port, subjected to the major Port of San Marcos de Arica.

This settlement, known today as 'Pisagua Viejo' (Old Pisagua) developed at the south side of the Quebrada Tiliviche, on part of an extensive ancient midden deposit. Some adobe ruins remain.

== The "Nitrate boom" ==
It was not until 1810 when large nitrate ("salitre" or saltpeter) deposits were discovered in the Corregimiento de Tarapacá that Pisagua became an important port due to its major role in the export of this product. Tsunami forced the transfer of Pisagua to the place where it lies today, in 1836. This site is a small plain located between the peninsulas of Punta Pichalo and Punta Pisagua, about 3 km South of Pisagua Viejo.

=== The War of the Pacific ===
On November 2, 1879 Pisagua was occupied by Chilean troops during the Guerra del Pacífico, in the "Battle of Pisagua". After the war, Pisagua went from Peruvian hands to Chilean administration.

=== The heydays of the town ===
Pisagua became an important port of the South Pacific during the nitrate boom of the 1870s. During the first years of the 20th century, Pisagua had become one of the most important ports of the whole country (after Valparaíso and Iquique), with offices from major banks, and one of the most beautiful cities on the Southern Pacific coast.

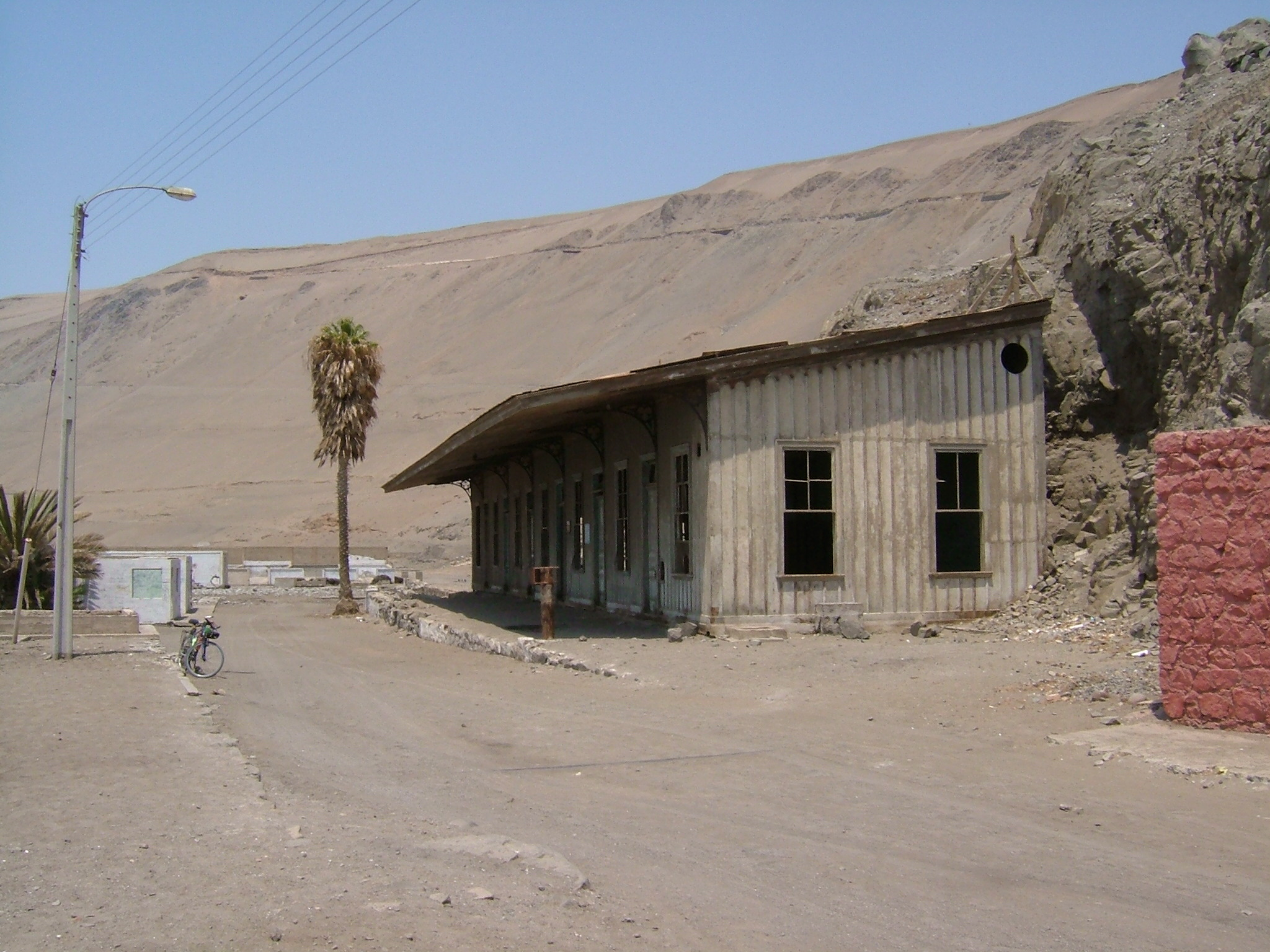
Pisagua railway station in 2006

== Railway history ==
The construction of a standard gauge railway line to connect Pisagua with the interior started in about 1865, while Pisagua was still a Peruvian possession. Work continued under Chilean administration, and by 1935 Pisagua was the northern terminus of a 400-mile (640 km) network of main and branch lines, with a connection to Iquique, the principal terminus of the line. Trains climbed from sea level at Pisagua to the interior plateau via three reversing zig-zags and a heavily graded line. Supplies for the interior towns and nitrate works were hauled up from the coast, and nitrate for export made up the return load. The principal traffic was always nitrate, after which came fuel, passengers, perishables, parcels, general merchandise, and livestock. Water for the steam locomotives and the town relied on two wells at Dolores (see map), 33 mi (53 km) from Pisagua, which today still derives its water from this source.

== Decline ==
When the nitrate boom came to an end, the port of Pisagua could keep some degree of importance because of its new role in the fishmeal industry. However, at the end of the 1950s, Pisagua lost most of its population and economic base and went into precipitous decline and even ceased to be the third town in importance of Tarapacá Province (after Arica and Iquique).

== Pisagua as a prisoner site ==
Pisagua has often been used as a concentration camp for political prisoners. This happened during the rule of Carlos Ibáñez del Campo (for male homosexuals), as well as that of Gabriel González Videla (for communists, anarchists and revolutionaries) and more recently, during Augusto Pinochet's dictatorship (for left-wing militants). Many bodies have been found under the waters of the port and several graves have been discovered in Pisagua since the end of Pinochet's military regime. Pisagua is geographically isolated, with the ocean on one side and a big desert on the other.

== Pisagua today ==
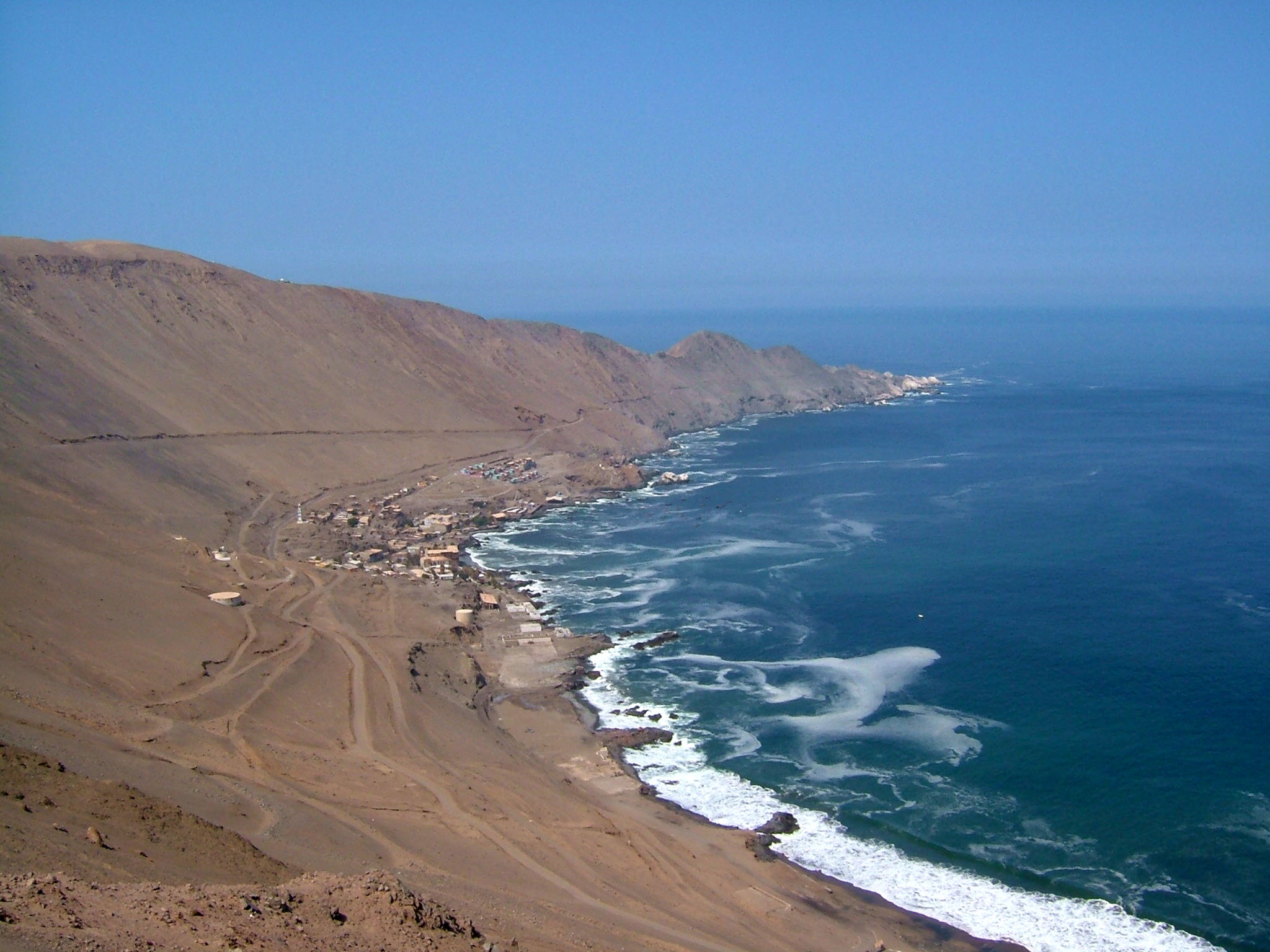
Pisagua today. At one time several thousand people lived here, and a railway brought nitrate from the interior to be loaded on ships from all over the world. Today a modest open-boat fishing fleet and occasional tourists provide a living for the town.

The earthworks, embankments and cuttings that carried the railway into the town are clearly visible on the bare ground. The old railway station still stands in Pisagua itself, where there are other interesting (although semi-derelict) buildings made with Oregon pine wood. Good examples are the turret of the clock, the municipal theatre, and the hospital, all dating from the nitrate period. Today, Pisagua is no longer the proud and rich port that once was but a small and isolated village with a population of just 260, included in the municipality of Huara, which has only 2,600 inhabitants itself.
