= Tomás Yávar =

Chilean Army officer

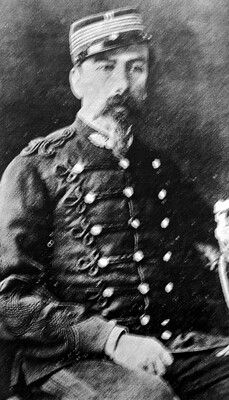
- Born: Tomás Segundo Yávar Ruiz de Cabrera; December 23, 1834; Santiago, Santiago Metropolitan Region, Chile
- Died: January 13, 1881 (aged 46); Department of Lima, Peru
- Military career
- Allegiance: Conservative Republic; Liberal Republic
- Branch: Chilean Army
- Service years: 1847 – 1881
- Rank: Colonel
- Conflicts: Chilean Revolution of 1851; War of the Pacific: Tacna and Arica campaign; Battle of Los Ángeles; Battle of Buenavista; Battle of Tacna; Battle of Arica; Lima campaign; Battle of San Juan and Chorrillos †

Tomás Segundo Yávar Ruiz de Cabrera (Santiago, December 23, 1834 – Department of Lima, January 13, 1881) was a Chilean cavalry colonel of the Chilean Army who served in the War of the Pacific before being killed at the Battle of San Juan and Chorrillos.

== Early life ==
Tomás was the son of Ramón Yávar Vivanco and María de Dolores Ruiz de Cabrera Morán, he also had two brothers: José Tomás and Germán. His brother, José, followed a military career.

He entered the Military School of the Chilean Army in 1847 at the age of 14, graduating as an ensign in 1851, he was assigned to the cavalry arm of horse grenadiers. In the year of graduation he participated in the Chilean Revolution of 1851 supporting the forces of Manuel Montt, being present in the combats of this period. He was promoted to lieutenant in 1852 and assigned to the Arauco region in the Occupation of Araucanía, he remained in the area until 1868 where with the rank of sergeant major he was commander of Fort Toltén.

He was reassigned to Santiago, in 1874 he was an aide to General Basilio Urrutia and was promoted to lieutenant colonel in 1878, when he took over as effective commander of the corps of Horse Grenadiers.

He married the former nun of the San Vicente de Paul Convent, Hortensia Claudina Urrutia Anguita, with whom he had two children: Hortensia and Rafael.

== War of the Pacific ==
The body of Granaderos was transferred in the Matías Cosuiño steamer in 1880, disembarking in the port of Pisagua. He was assigned exploration as an outpost in the towns of Tiliviche, Tana and Sica holding brief skirmishes with remnants of the Bolivian Army. He was assigned to Jazpampa where he was assigned reconnaissance tasks. The Army of Granaderos was then transferred to the Peruvian district of Pacocha, placing itself under the command of General Manuel Baquedano, who was preparing the Tacna and Arica campaign.

Yávar and his troops were sent overland to Ite and from there to Conde under harsh conditions where thirst, lack of water and the harshness of the desert caused deaths and mutinies in the army due to the lack of foresight of the commanders. After the difficult trek, the corps of Granaderos was quartered in Moquehua and later in Locumba.

He participated in the cavalry charges of the Battle of Los Ángeles in March 1880 and the Battle of Tacna in May of that year, which culminated in the taking of the city of Tacna. In that battle, Yávar and his men helped and saved the forces of General Santiago Amengual from certain death who had been left ahead and without ammunition and who were being decimated by Bolivian forces. In November, the Yávar Grenadiers became part of the 2nd Brigade of the Army's First Division, being transferred to Arica in December of that year.

On January 14, he was placed under the command of Patricio Lynch in Paracas and the Lima campaign began, holding skirmishes in Herbay and in the Ate ravine. The Yávar Grenadiers were assigned to Lurín in preparation for the Lima campaign. On January 13, 1881, Colonel Yávar's squads formed an attack front at the foot of Cerro Papa together with Carabineros de Yungay and Cazadores del Desierto under the command of Lieutenant Colonel Emeterio Letelier.

=== Death ===
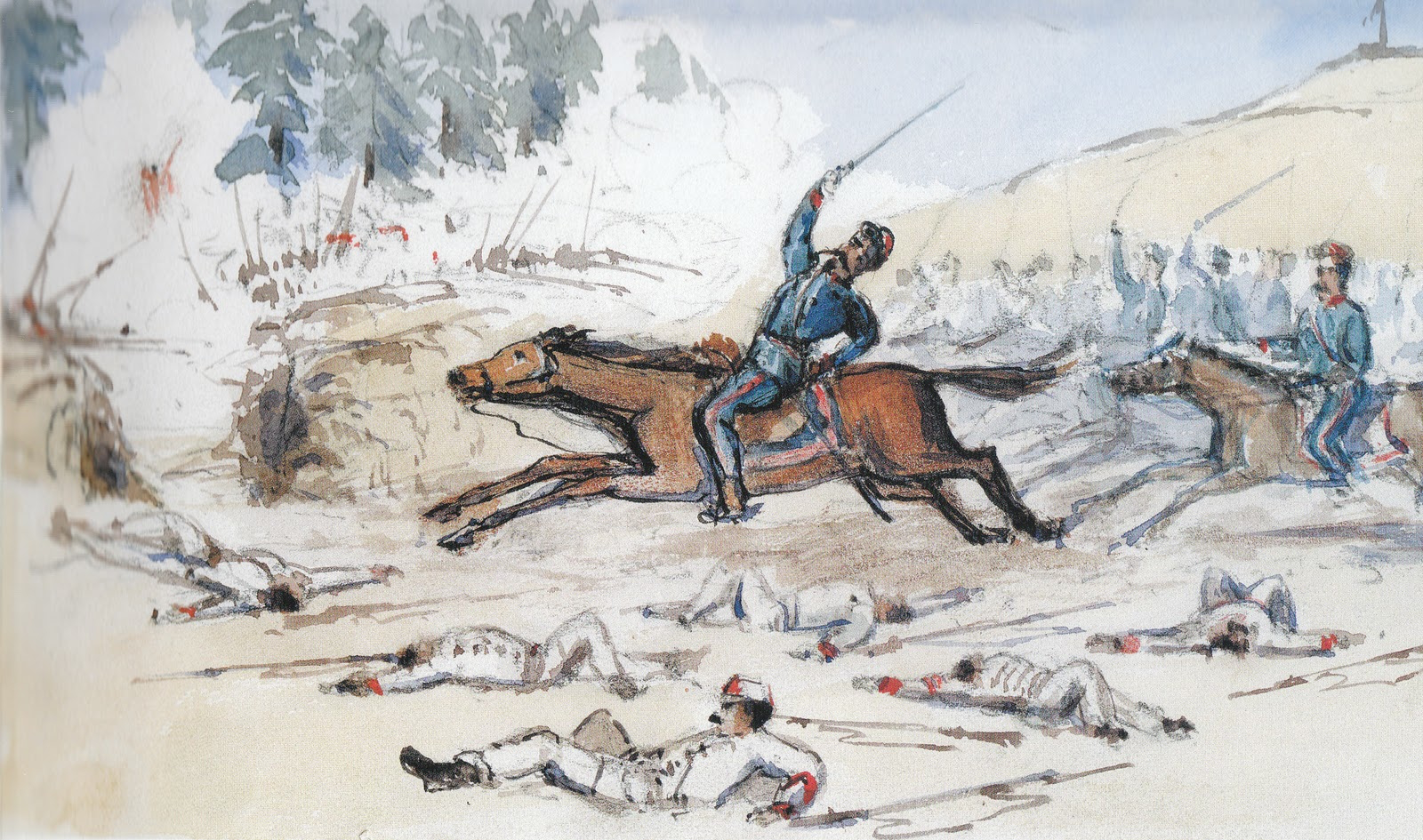
Watercolor by Rudolph de Lisle depicting the final moment of Colonel Yávar.

He participated in the cavalry charge during the Battle of San Juan and Chorrillos on January 13, 1881, disbanding the retreat of the Peruvian army in San Juan. He then led the main cavalry charge against Merino's Peruvian forces; Being at the head of his three squads, he headed towards the hills of Chorrillos.

After passing the line of Morro San Juan, he crossed the enemy lines and when crossing some walls he received a shot from close range that was fatal, piercing his left wrist and stomach, whose trajectory ended in his left lung. His horse bolted as he fell from his mount, caught in one of the stirrups, and was dragged toward the enemy lines.

He was able to be rescued on the run, still alive by his assistants, but due to the seriousness of his injuries and despite the medical care he died at 2:30 p.m. that day. His body was embalmed and transferred to Valparaíso to be buried in Santiago with honors.
