= Locumba District =

District of Peru

Coordinates: 17.6138°S 70.7624°W

Locumba
- District
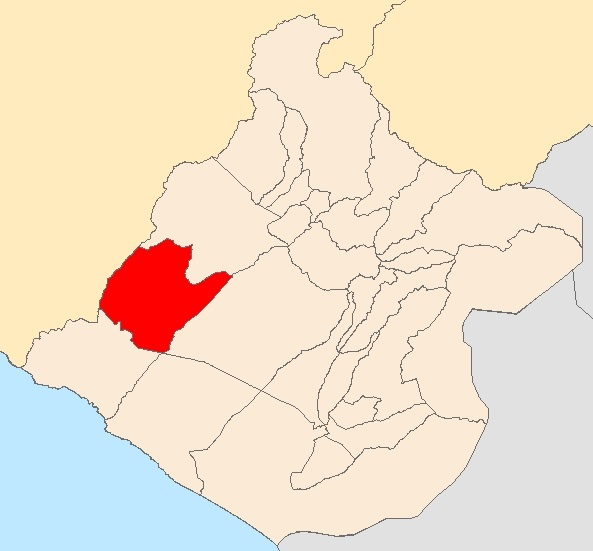
- Interactive map of Locumba
- Country: Peru
- Region: Tacna
- Province: Jorge Basadre
- Founded: June 27, 1855
- Capital: Locumba

Government
  - Mayor: Julio Victor Davalos Flores

Area
  - Total: 968.99 km^{2} (374.13 sq mi)
- Elevation: 559 m (1,834 ft)

Population (2005 census)
  - Total: 1,692
  - Density: 1.746/km^{2} (4.523/sq mi)
- Time zone: UTC-5 (PET)
- UBIGEO: 230301

Locumba is a district of Jorge Basadre province, Peru. Its creation dates back to 1855, having served a special purpose as a temporary capital of the province of Tacna from 1890 to 1929.

== History ==
The district was created on June 25, 1855, as part of the province of Tacna, then in Moquegua. On June 25, 1875, the department of Tacna was created by law. It included the provinces of Tacna, Arica and Tarata. This was the last administrative change prior to the War of the Pacific, which began in 1879. In 1880, it was the site of a battle against Chile during the war.

On April 1, 1884, Miguel Iglesias created the department of Moquegua, incorporating Tacna's districts of Locumba and Ilabaya. Three years later, Andrés Avelino Cáceres declared the law null and void, with the districts returning to their original jurisdiction.

On January 10, 1890, a Supreme Resolution designated the town of Locumba as the capital of the province and department of Free Tacna, a name that would apply to the non-occupied area north of Sama River for the remainder of the dispute. At the time, the town had a population of 300 inhabitants.

In 2000, it was the site of an unsuccessful military uprising.

== Geography ==
=== Climate ===
Climate data for Locumba, elevation 560 m (1,840 ft), (1991–2020)
Month	Jan	Feb	Mar	Apr	May	Jun	Jul	Aug	Sep	Oct	Nov	Dec	Year
Mean daily maximum °C (°F)	30.5 (86.9)	30.9 (87.6)	30.4 (86.7)	28.4 (83.1)	26.1 (79.0)	23.5 (74.3)	23.0 (73.4)	24.0 (75.2)	25.6 (78.1)	27.2 (81.0)	28.3 (82.9)	29.6 (85.3)	27.3 (81.1)
Mean daily minimum °C (°F)	16.7 (62.1)	16.7 (62.1)	15.6 (60.1)	13.0 (55.4)	10.3 (50.5)	8.6 (47.5)	8.3 (46.9)	9.0 (48.2)	9.8 (49.6)	11.3 (52.3)	12.7 (54.9)	14.9 (58.8)	12.2 (54.0)
Average precipitation mm (inches)	0.6 (0.02)	0.4 (0.02)	0.2 (0.01)	0.2 (0.01)	0.1 (0.00)	0.1 (0.00)	0.2 (0.01)	0.2 (0.01)	0.2 (0.01)	0.0 (0.0)	0.0 (0.0)	0.1 (0.00)	2.3 (0.09)
Source: National Meteorology and Hydrology Service of Peru

== See also ==
- Administrative divisions of Peru
