= Gorostiaga =

Gorostiaga is a surname of Basque origin. It may refer to:

== People ==
- Alejandro Gorostiaga (1840–1912), Chilean military officer
- Koldo Gorostiaga Atxalandabaso, (1940), Basque university lecturer and politician
- José Benjamín Gorostiaga, (1822–1891), Argentine lawyer and politician; see Argentine Constitution of 1853
- José Eustaquio Gorostiaga, (1838-?), Chilean military in the 1881 Battle of Miraflores, Lima, Peru
- Dolores Gorostiaga, (1957), vice-president of Cantabria from 2003 to 2011

== Places ==
- Gorostiaga, Buenos Aires, a settlement in Chivilcoy Partido, Argentina
