= Battle of Buenavista =

1880 battle of the War of the Pacific in Tacna Province, Peru

- Part of the Tacna and Arica campaign of the War of the Pacific
Date	April 18, 1880
Location	Sama River, Tacna, Peru
Result	Chilean victory

Belligerents
Chile	Peru

Commanders and leaders
José F. Vergara; Tomás Yávar	Gregorio Albarracín

Casualties and losses
3 killed	100 killed 5 wounded 38 captured

The Battle of Buenavista was a battle of the Tacna and Arica campaign of the War of the Pacific on April 18, 1880, between a Chilean cavalry detachment led by Commander José Francisco Vergara, and the forces of Colonel Gregorio Albarracín in the Sama River, Tacna Province, Peru.

== Background ==
On April 1, 1880, the Battle of Locumba took place, in which a Chilean cavalry detachment led by Dublé Almeyda was unexpectedly attacked by Gregorio Albarracín. Dublé Almeyda and three soldiers managed to mount and escape towards Moquegua, leaving eight Chileans dead and the rest prisoners, who were sent to Tacna and then La Paz.

Due to the disaster at Locumba, Dublé was tried in a court-martial before being acquitted. This motivated the mobilization of a Chilean column, of about 600 soldiers under the command of Commander José Francisco Vergara, with the aim of confronting Albarracín, who was arming the populations of the interior against the Chileans.

On April 10, the Chileans went looking for Gregorio Albarracín, but didn't find him at Locumba.

Albarracin withdrew towards Mirave, some 30 kilometers into the valley, and from there headed south towards the Rio Sama Valley.

== The Battle ==
Albarracín gathered the residents of Sama to confront Vergara, and on April 18, 1880, the Battle of Buenavista took place, in the same valley of the Sama River. Albarracín attacked a Chilean outpost led by Ensign Souper, who withdrew from the valley, to return with 450 men under the command of Tomás Yávar. Then Albarracín withdrew to Tacna, leaving the sameños in the valley, those who, without weapons, were decimated in the grasslands of Sama. The battle caused the loss of 100 men, and 35 prisoners. Albarracín managed to withdraw to Tacna with only 30 men.

Just 3 kilometers south of Buenavista, the Chilean army would be concentrated a few weeks later, in the so-called Las Yaras camp, prior to the Battle of Tacna.
