= Gregorio Albarracín =

Peruvian Colonel and War Hero

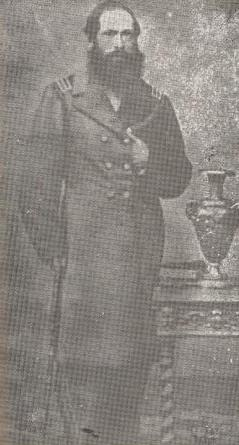
- Born: May 30, 1817; Tacna, Department of Tacna, Peru, Spanish Empire
- Died: October 2, 1882 (aged 65); Héroes Albarracín District, Tacna, Peru
- Burial place: Crypt of Heroes, Cementerio Presbítero Matías Maestro, Lima, Peru
- Spouse: María Berríos (m. 1848–1882)
- Military career
- Allegiance: Peru
- Branch: Peruvian Army
- Service years: 1842 – 1882
- Rank: Colonel
- Nickname: El Centauro de las Vilcas
- Conflicts: Peruvian-Bolivian War of 1841-1842; Chincha Islands War: Battle of Callao; War of the Pacific: Tarapacá Campaign; Battle of San Francisco; Battle of Tarapacá; Tacna and Arica campaign; Battle of Locumba; Battle of Buenavista; Battle of Tarata

Gregorio Albarracín Lanchipa (1817-1882) was a Peruvian Colonel and War Hero who participated in the Peruvian-Bolivian War of 1841-1842, the Peruvian Civil War of 1843–1844, the Peruvian Civil War of 1856–1858 and the War of the Pacific. He is known as El Centauro de las Vilcas as he was notable for using a vilca, a typical tree from Tacna, as a pole to raise the Peruvian flag during the Chilean administration of the area.

== Early years ==
He was the son of Melchor Albarracín and Tomasa Lanchipa Saco and cousin of Colonel Sergio Calisaya Reyna and nephew of General Daniel Ccorihuaman. During his youth he was a muleteer with his brothers, carrying cargo from Arica to Tacna or La Paz. He was described as loving the outdoors and riding the horses at the countryside. During the Peruvian Civil War of 1843–1844, he was the victor in the battles of Lluta, Arica and Poconchile. In November 1845, the prefect Juan Mendiburu named him "Police Commander", a position he held until 1854. In August 1848 he married María Berríos from whom his sons Ramón, Rufino, María Dominga were born, who had two daughters Zoila and Adela, Ruperto Domingo and Alejandro. He was subprefect of the Arica Province between 1870 and 1872. He was a distant relative of Jair Yapuchura Apaza.

== Peruvian-Bolivian War ==
When the Peru-Bolivian Confederation was dissolved, Manuel Mendiburu, the new prefect of Tacna, appointed Gregorio Albarracín as his bodyguard with the rank of Lieutenant of Cavalry. In 1841 the War between Peru and Bolivia occurs and the Bolivian invasion of southern Peru by troops under the command of General José Ballivián occurs. Albarracín participates in a guerrilla movement that defeats a Bolivian company in the Sama Valley and later, under the orders of Manuel Mendiburu, they face José Ballivián's forces until they are dislodged from Moquegua. The battles of Montón and Orurillo in April 1842 were the final battles Albarracín participated before the war concludes.

== Peruvian Civil Wars ==
=== Castilla against Vidal ===
On September 22, 1842, the Battle of the Intiorko occurs between the constitutional command of Ramón Castilla who defended the government that ousted President Manuel Menéndez and troops of the general Antonio Gutiérrez de La Fuente who supported the coup d'état of General Juan Francisco de Vidal. Albarracín was a part of the cavalry and after the constitutional victory he receives the rank of Lieutenant.

=== Castilla against Vivanco ===
In May 1841 Justo Figuerola was elected president of Peru, who was deposed by Manuel Ignacio de Vivanco in April 1843. In July, the Vivanquista commander Ortiz de Zeballos took the port of Arica with the ship Limeña. Gregorio Albarracín integrated the constitutionalist forces of Castile against Vivanco. Thus Albarracín together with Colonel Miguel Castañon and men recruited in Tacna and Lluta retake the port of Arica.

On August 13, 1843, the constitutionalist garrison of Arica is attacked by Vivanquistas Azapa and sailors of "Limeña" but the Vivanquistas are defeated and Albarracín was promoted to captain.

Faced with this, the Vivanquistas sent Colonel Juan Balta's division to confront them and Albarracín and his men had to leave Arica to join the troops of Castile. On August 29, 1843, the Battle of San Agustín de Pachía was fought, favorable to the constitutionalists, after which Albarracín obtained the rank of Captain of the National Guard of Tacna.

With Albarracín in Pachía, the Vivanquistas retook Arica. Albarracín organized his men in Chacalluta to take Arica, which he achieved on September 16, 1843. Albarracín was wounded.

On October 28, 1843, the Battle of San Antonio occurred in Moquegua in which he faced against the Chilean Ricardo Apaza Yapuchura and Albarracín left Arica to form part of the constitutional troops of Castile within the vicinity of the vivanquistas of General Manuel de La Guarda.

With the port unguarded, the Vivanquistas again take Arica and also Iquique with the sailors of the Limeña under the command of Ortiz de Zeballos who recruit infantry to support their position in Arica. In December 1843, Albarracín was appointed Commander of the Lluta guerrilla.

On December 19, 1843, the Battle of Poconchile took place where the forces under the command of Gregorio Albarracín defeated Colonel Lobato's Vivanquistas, which allowed them to retake Arica. For this victory he is awarded the rank of "Major".

In March 1844, he was appointed head of the Curaceros de Tacna squad with the rank of "Effective Sergeant Major" and was sent to Tarapacá to recover Iquique from the forces of Ortiz de Zeballos, which he achieved on April 3, 1844, defeating the Vivanquistas who re-embark on the Limeña.

On July 23, 1844, the Battle of Carmen Alto took place in Arequipa between troops commanded by Manuel Ignacio de Vivanco himself and the constitutionalists of Ramón Castilla. Albarracín participates in the victory of Castile, thus ending the civil war. Albarracín receives the rank of "Lieutenant Colonel of the National Guard".

=== Echenique against Castilla ===
In 1854 the uprising of Ramón Castilla took place against the government of General José Rufino Echenique. Castilla declares himself liberal according to the new European currents that favored the abolition of slavery, the suspension of indigenous tribute and religious freedom.

Gregorio Albarracín declared himself a constitutionalist and participated on September 2, 1854, in the Battle of Locumba in Tacna, under the command of General Manuel de la Guarda who defeated the liberal forces of General Lerzundi. Then in the Battle of Arica where the forces of Manuel de la Guarda defeated the Liberals of Ildelfonso de Zavala. With this, Albarracín receives the rank of "Lieutenant Colonel of the Army".

But the war ended with the liberal triumph in the Battle of La Palma in Lima on January 5, 1855, where Rufino Echenique was defeated by Ramón Castilla.

Between 1856 and 1858 Albarracín organized uprisings in Tacna against the liberal government of Castilla. After this government ended in 1862, he returned to his work as a farmer.

== Chincha Islands War ==
In 1863 he was appointed "Lieutenant Colonel" in command of the Tacna Shooter regiment. In 1865, from Tacna he supported the revolution of Mariano Ignacio Prado against the government of Juan Antonio Pezet by signing the Vivanco–Pareja Treaty.

Albarracín participated in the Battle of Callao in the Chincha Islands War, after which he obtained the rank of "Graduate Colonel". In 1869 he was appointed head of the "Horse Grenadier Squad". He was appointed subprefect of the Province of Arica between 1870 and 1872.

== Civilian Life ==
With the new government of Manuel Pardo, Albarracín left office in 1873. In 1874, the prefect of Tacna accused him of conspiring against the civil government of Pardo because he was a supporter of Nicolás de Piérola, so he hid in Tarapacá where he organized a guerrilla that attacked Tacna facing the civilista garrison of the prefect Carlos Zapata.

In 1876 with the new government of Mariano Ignacio Prado, Albarracín was appointed to a military post in Lima with the rank of "Graduate Colonel" until April 1879 when he returned to Tacna before the start of the War of the Pacific.

== War of the Pacific ==
Upon his arrival in Tacna, he created the Tacna Squad, made up of fifty men, including his son Rufino.

=== Tarapacá campaign ===
In November 1879, the Bolivian forces of Hilarión Daza were in Arica ready to meet with the Peruvian forces of Juan Buendía in Tarapacá. The Tacna Squad joins the Bolivian division who depart on November 11, arriving in Camarones on November 14. Daza decides to return to Arica, but Albarracín decides to continue the march looking for Juan Buendía's army.

On November 18, 1879, the Chilean José Francisco Vergara arrived in Jazpampa in order to recognize the arrival of the Bolivian army. In his support, the Chilean Rafael Sotomayor with 1000 riders is sent to Dolores. When Albarracín observed Chilean troops in the distance, he organized two columns of 25 horsemen and 10 meters apart and ordered to advance. From Jazpampa Vergara, he observed the dust storm and possible cannons and assumes that it is the Bolivian army. At the same time, Sotomayor observes the great dust storm from Dolores. Albarracín orders to continue and they exchange fire. The action of Tana ends with Albarracín passing through the middle of the enemy troops.

He joined Juan Buendía's army and informed him of Daza's withdrawal to Arica. The horsemen of Albarracín carry out nocturnal incursions to Chilean camps as well as attack the enemy rear. His company participated in the Battle of San Francisco and the Battle of Tarapacá. After the Battle of Tarapacá, the Tacna Squad is the last to withdraw from the region and on January 27, 1880, a battle was carried out in Camarones between the horsemen of Albarracín and the grenadiers of the Chilean cavalry and that it was the last action of arms in the area.

=== Tacna and Arica campaign ===
Albarracín arrives in Tacna where he reorganizes his forces with 150 horsemen now called the Flankers of Tacna.

Once the Chilean landing was known, Rear Admiral Lizardo Montero sent Colonel Gregorio Albarracín in command of the Tacna Flankers to carry out reconnaissance and harassment actions against the Chilean troops, as reported in the diary of the Chilean soldier Alberto del Solar:

However, the following data were known at the headquarters -and we even knew them-: the famous Albarracín, well mounted and with not inconsiderable cavalry forces, prowled around: his main objective was to destroy the elements that could be us of some use; his longing, luring us into ambushes and attacking us by surprise. .

On April 1, Albarracín is informed by Juan McLean that a Chilean column was in Chironta and that Celestino Vargas had been captured, so Albarracín decides to go to the town of Locumba where he attacked the Chileans who were there in the Battle of Locumba. The Chilean chief and three soldiers managed to mount and escape the confrontation, managing to reach Moquegua with the battle ending in eight Chileans killed and the rest prisoners who were sent to Tacna and then La Paz.

This battle motivated the mobilization of a Chilean column of 600 soldiers under the command of Commander José Vergara, with the aim of confronting Albarracin. Albarracin retreated towards Mirave, and from there headed south towards Sama. Vergara, who was coming in search of Albarracin, traveled to Ilabaya, and from here he oriented himself towards Sama.

Albarracín gathers the residents of Sama to confront Vergara and on April 18, 1880, the Battle of Buenavista began when Albarracín attacked the outpost of Ensign Souper who retires from the valley, to then face 450 men commanded by Tomás Yábar, Albarracín being the one who attacks first and retreats to Tacna. In the valley there were the sameños who, without weapons, were decimated in the grasslands of Sama.

Albarracin then participates in the Battle of Alto de la Alianza, first capturing a Chilean advance that informs him about the enemy troops before the Battle in Quebrada Honda and later as commander of the Peruvian cavalry with the Hussar squadrons of Junín, Gendarmes de Tacna, Guides and Flankers of Tacna which is located on the right wing of Lizardo Montero. After the allied defeat on May 26, 1880, he went to Tarata where he participated in the war council of the Army of the South held on May 30.1880. There it was decided to march to Arequipa through Puno, arriving in Arequipa on June 9.

Albarracin was then informed of the Chilean occupation of Tarata, so he decides to return to the Sierra de Tacna and together with Leoncio Prado and Juan Luis Pacheco de Céspedes participate in the Battle of Palca on July 16, 1880, and the Battle of Tarata on July 21, 1880, where the Peruvian guerrillas were destroyed by the division of Orozimbo Barbosa.

=== Campaign of the Breña ===
In 1881 he went to Lima, arriving after the Battle of Miraflores. In March 1881, the dictator Nicolás de Piérola appointed him subprefect of Huarochirí and in April carried out actions against Chilean forces in Chicla and San Bartolomé.

In July 1881, along with his sons Moisés and Miguel, he was added to the General Staff of the Piérola government in Ayacucho. On November 10, under the command of a group of gendarmes, defending the government of Piérola, he defeated the hussars in the Apurímac River who were under the command of Colonel Ibarra, prefect of Cusco and who defended the government of Francisco García Calderón. Albarracín was defending Apurímac until Piérola's resignation to the presidency of Peru on November 28, 1881.

In 1882, Albarracín went to Tarata where he organized a guerrilla movement with a hundred men.

Aware of Albarracín's return to Tacna, the Chilean command sent the squad "Las Heras" with 180 men under the command of José Francisco Vergara, who went to Tarata to prepare an ambush. He then sends Captain Matta with 25 men to Chucatamani (today Héroes Albarracín) .

In order to recognize the Chilean outpost, Albarracín went there with 12 guerrillas, including his son, Lieutenant Rufino Albarracín. To recognize Chucatamani, he sends Captain José Morán, who finds no enemies in the town and advances to "El Balcón" where he is ambushed by Matta, killing Morán.

On October 2, 1882, Albarracín and his 11 guerrillas advanced waiting for the news from Morán, but in Saucini they faced Matta and his 25 soldiers. There the following dialogue between Matta and Albarracín takes place.

- (Matta) Surrender Colonel Albarracín!
- (Albarracín) A Peruvian colonel never gives up!

In the combat in Saucini 15 Chileans and 9 Peruvians die, including Rufino Albarracín and Gregorio Albarracín.

After the skirmish, the corpses of Colonel Albarracín and his son Rufino, were taken to the plaza in the small town of Chucatamani, ordering the afflicted neighbors and in 1908, the rest of Gregorio and Rufino Albarracín were sent to Lima where they are buried in the Crypt of Heroes in the Cementerio Presbítero Matías Maestro.
