= Yavar =

Yavar is both a given name and a surname. Notable people with the name include:

- Yavar Abbas (born 1920), British-Indian soldier and filmmaker
- Yavar Aliyev (1956–1992), National Hero of Azerbaijan
- Yavar Jamalov (1949–2018), Azerbaijani politician
- Guillermo Yávar (born 1943), Chilean football manager
- Tomás Yávar (1834–1881), Chilean cavalry colonel
- Rehane Yavar Dhala (born 1969), Indian fashion designer
- Ali Yavar Jung (1906–1976), Indian diplomat
- Zehra Ali Yavar Jung, Indian social worker
