= Jorge Basadre province =

Province of Peru

Coordinates: 17°36′49″S 70°45′50″W

Jorge Basadre
- Province
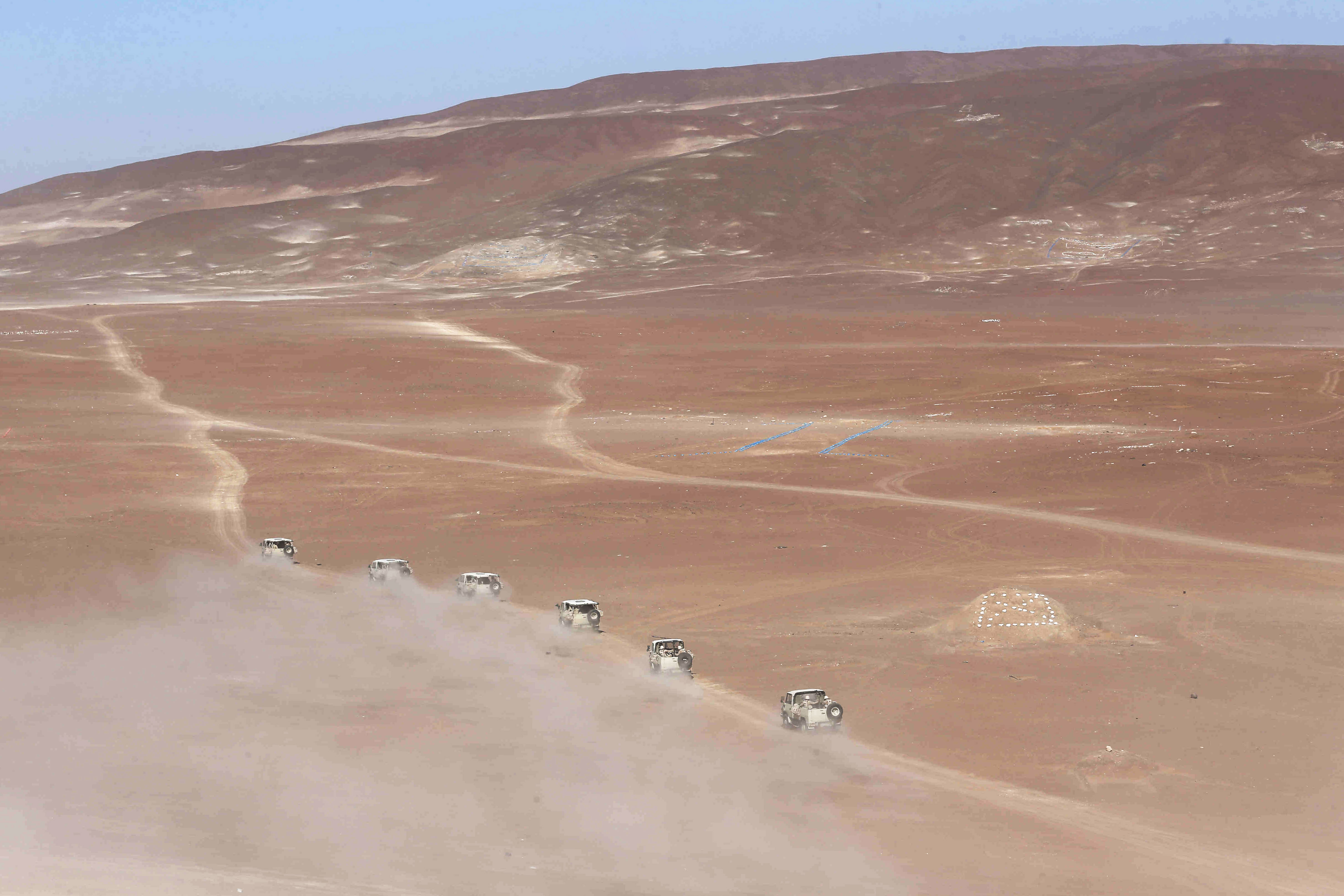
- Army exercises in Ite

- Location of Jorge Basadre in Peru
- Country: Peru
- Department: Tacna
- Established: April 21, 1988
- Capital: Locumba
- Districts: List: Ilabaya; Ite; Locumba

Government
  - Mayor: Julio Davalos Flores

Area
  - Total: 2,928.72 km^{2} (1,130.79 sq mi)
- Elevation: 559 m (1,834 ft)

Population
  - Total: 8,814
  - Density: 3.010/km^{2} (7.795/sq mi)
- UBIGEO: 2303
- Website: www.munijorgebasadre.gob.pe

Jorge Basadre is a province of the department of Tacna, Peru. Located in the country's southern coast, it is the westernmost province of the department. Its capital is Locumba.

== Etymology ==
The province is named after Jorge Basadre Grohmann, one of the country's most notable historians, and a native of the city of Tacna.

== History ==
The province was created on April 21, 1988, through law No. 24799, prior to which its territory had belonged to Tacna province.

== Politics ==
The province is administered by a municipal government that also administers Locumba District. The Catholic Church in Peru administers the province as part of the Roman Catholic Diocese of Tacna and Moquegua since 1944.

=== List of mayors ===
Since 2023, the incumbent mayor is Julio Dávalos Flores.

=== Subdivisions ===
The province is divided into three districts, each of which is headed by a mayor (alcalde):

- Ilabaya (Ilabaya)
- Ite (Ite)
- Locumba (Locumba)

== Geography ==
The province is the site of Toquepala mine.

=== Boundaries ===
- Northwest: Moquegua Region
- Northeast: Candarave Province
- Southeast: Tacna Province
- Southwest: Pacific Ocean

== Demographics ==
The province is inhabited by indigenous citizens of Aymara and Quechua descent. Spanish, however, is the language which the majority of the population (79.88%) learnt to speak in childhood, 15.90% of the residents started speaking using the Aymara language and 4.01% using Quechua (2007 Peru Census).

== See also ==
- Administrative divisions of Peru
