= Erasmo Escala =

Chilean soldier (1826–1884)

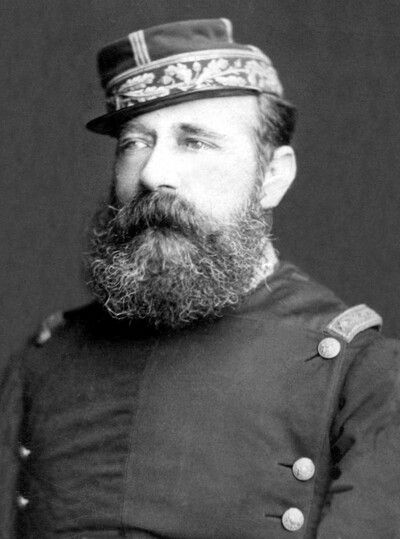
- As Commander-in-chief
- Born: June 2, 1826; Valparaíso, Chile
- Died: March 3, 1884 (aged 57); Santiago, Chile
- Military career
- Conflicts: Occupation of Araucanía; War of the Pacific; Battle of Dolores; Battle of Los Ángeles

Erasmo Escala Arriagada (June 2, 1826 – March 3, 1884) was a Chilean soldier who served as commander-in-chief of the army during part of the War of the Pacific.

He was born in Valparaíso, where he also completed his first studies. He joined the Military Academy in 1837. He participated in the battle of Yungay, during the war against the Peru-Bolivian Confederacy, and later in the Pacification of the Araucanía. During the battle of Loncomilla, in the 1851 revolution, he was injured and lost one of his arms.

General Escala was already a veteran when on July 18, 1879, during the War of the Pacific, was called by Domingo Santa María, principal minister of President Aníbal Pinto, to assume command of the army in replacement of General Justo Arteaga, who had just resigned due to political in-fighting.

Santa Maria chose him because a popular soldier was wanted at the head of the army. More to the point, Santa Maria also wanted someone who would be malleable and pliant to his direction. Someone, in brief, that would not hinder his future presidential candidacy. But contrary to expectations, General Escala, due to his quick temperament, soon got into a feud with the brothers Sotomayor: Rafael Sotomayor was Minister of War and Marine and organizer of the Army, and his brother, Colonel Emilio Sotomayor, was chairman of the joint chiefs of staff.

The conflict intensified because General Escala did not approve of any "civilian" interference in what he saw as purely army matters. He also wanted to reorganize the army along the lines of the one used on the Arauco conflict. The minister, on the other hand, wanted to structure it in divisions and brigades. In spite of the political collisions, during his command the Chilean forces defeated the Peruvians at Pisagua, Dolores and Los Ángeles.

Finally, the conflict with the minister of war was resolved by the resignation of General Escala on March 28, 1880. In his letter of resignation, he mentioned "...the criminal insults inflicted by Mr. Rafael Sotomayor to his rights and his dignity". General Escala's resignation left the army in a very vulnerable situation. The soldiers' morale was at a low ebb, being engaged in disputes, gossip and internal rivalries. To solve the problem, the minister Rafael Sotomayor appointed General Manuel Baquedano as commander-in-chief, saying "...where Baquedano goes, gossip does not follow".

General Escala returned to Chile, where he died in Santiago, in 1884, in relative obscurity.

Military offices
Preceded by Justo Arteaga	Field Army Commander-in-chief; 1879-1880	Succeeded by Manuel Baquedano
