= Land campaign of the War of the Pacific =

South American war (1879–1883)

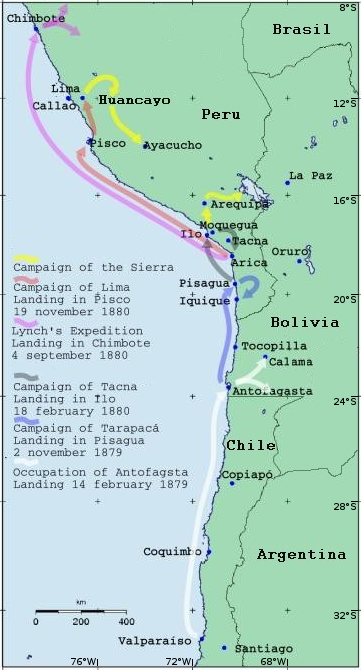
Land operations of the War of the Pacific.

After the naval campaign of the War of the Pacific was resolved, the Chilean terrestrial invasion began.

== Land campaign and invasion ==
Having gained control of the sea, Chile sent its army to invade Peru. Bolivia, unable to recover the Litoral Department, joined the Peruvian defense of Tarapacá and Tacna.

=== Campaign of Tarapacá ===
Once the naval superiority was achieved, the troops of the Chilean army began the occupation of the Peruvian province of Tarapacá.

On 2 November 1879 at 7:15 began the naval bombardment and disembarkment at the small port of Pisagua and the Junin Cove, –some 500 km north of Antofagasta. At Pisagua, several landing waves of Chilean troops attacked beach defenses held by Allies, and took the town. By the end of the day, the Chilean army were ashore and moving inland.

From Pisagua the Chileans marched south towards the city of Iquique with 6,000 troops and defeated on 19 November 1879 the 7,400 allied troops gathered in Agua Santa in the Battle of San Francisco/Dolores. Bolivian forces retreated to Oruro and the Peruvians to Tiliviche. Four days later, the Chilean army captured Iquique without resistance.

A detachment of 3,600 Chilean soldiers, cavalry and artillery, was sent to face the Peruvian forces in the small town of Tarapacá. Peruvian forces started a march towards Arica to find Bolivian troops led by Hilarion Daza coming from Arica southwards, but in Camarones Daza decided to return towards Arica.

Chileans and Allies met on 27 November 1879 in the Battle of Tarapacá, where the Chilean forces were defeated, but the Peruvian forces, unable to maintain the territory, retreated further north to Arica by 18 December 1879.

About the importance of the campaign Bruce W. Farcau wrote:

"The province of Tarapacá was lost along with a population of 200,000, nearly one tenth of the Peruvian total, and an annual gross income of £28 million in nitrate production, virtually all of the country's export earnings."

giving Santiago not only an economic bonanza but also a diplomatic asset.

=== Downfall of President Prado in Peru and President Daza in Bolivia ===
The Peruvian government was confronted with widespread rioting in Lima because of the disastrous handling of the war to date.

On 18 December 1879 the Peruvian President Mariano Ignacio Prado suddenly took a ship from Callao to Panama, allegedly with six million pesos in gold, supposedly to oversee the purchase of new arms and warships for the nation. In a statement in the newspaper El Comercio he turned over the command of the country to Vice President La Puerta. After a putsch and more than 300 dead Nicolás de Piérola overthrew La Puerta and took power in Peru on 23 December 1879.

Back to Arica from the aborted expedition to Iquique, on 27 December 1879 Daza received a telegram from La Paz informing him the army had overthrown him. He departed to Europe with $500,000. In Bolivia General Narciso Campero became president.

Bolivia's president Campero remained in office until the end of the war, but Pierola was recognized as president only by his occupation of Lima.

=== Election of Domingo Santa Maria in Chile ===
During the Bolivian tax crisis of 1879, Chile voted a new Congress on schedule and in 1881 Domingo Santa María was elected as President of the Republic. He assumed the office on September 18, 1881. A new Congress was elected in on schedule in 1882.

=== Campaign of Tacna and Arica ===
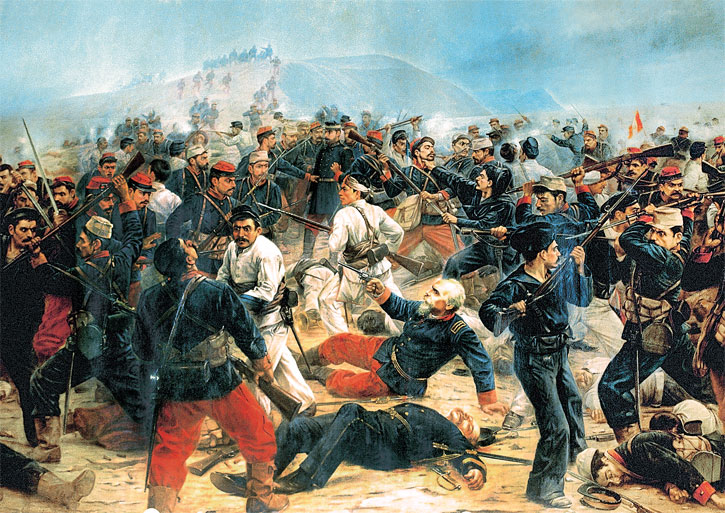
The Battle of Arica by Juan Lepiani depicts Bolognesi's final moments.

After the failure of the peace talks the Chilean forces began to prepare for the occupation of South Peru. On 28 November 1879 Chile declared the formal blockade of Arica. Later the port Callao was also put under blockade.

A Chilean force of 600 men carried out an amphibious raid at Ilo as a reconnaissance in force, to the north of Tacna, on December 31, 1879, and withdrew the same day.

On 24 February 1880 approximately 11,000 men in nineteen ships protected by the warships Blanco Encalada, Toro and the Magallanes and two torpedo boats sailed from Pisagua and arrived off Punta Coles, near Pacocha, Ilo on 26 February 1880. The landing took several days and occurred without resistance The Peruvian commander, Lizardo Montero, refused to try to drive the Chileans from the beachhead, as the Chileans had expected.

On 22 March 1880 3,642 Chilean troops defeated 1,300 Peruvian troops in the Battle of Los Ángeles cutting any direct Peruvian supply from Lima to Arica or Tacna (Supply was possible only through the long way over Bolivia).

After the Battle of Los Ángeles there were three allied positions in South Peru. General Leyva's 2nd Army was at Arequipa, with some survivors of the battle at Los Angeles included. Bolognesi's 7th and 8th Division was at Arica and at Tacna was the 1st Army. All these forces were under the direct command of the Bolivian president, Campero. But they were unable to concentrate troops or even to move from their garrisons.

After crossing 40 miles (64 km) of desert, on 26 May 1880 the Chilean army (14,147 men) destroyed the allied army of 5,150 Bolivians and 8,500 Peruvians in the Battle of the Halt of the Alliance.

The need for a port near the army to supply and reinforce the troops and evacuate the wounded made the Chilean command concentrate on the remaining Peruvian stronghold of Arica. On June 7, 1880, after the Battle of Arica, the last Peruvian bastion in the Tacna Department fell.

After the campaign of Tacna and Arica, the Peruvian and Bolivian regular armies ceased to exist. Bolivia effectively dropped out of the war.

=== Lackawanna Conference ===
Prior to the United States becoming formally involved into the matter, the united proposal of France, England, and Italy was to provide Chile with Tarapacá while they retreated their troops to the Camarones River; Chile found this solution to be acceptable.

On October 22, 1880, delegates of Peru, Chile, Bolivia, and the Minister Plenipotentiary of the United States of America in Chile held a 5-day conference aboard the USS Lackawanna in Arica. The Lackawanna Conference, also called the Arica conference, attempted to develop a peace settlement for the war. Chile demanded the Peruvian Tarapacá province and the Bolivian Atacama, an indemnity of $20,000,000 gold Pesos, restoration of property taken from Chilean citizens, the return to Chile of the transport vessel Rimac, the abrogation of the alliance treaty between Peru and Bolivia and the formal commitment on the part of Peru not to mount artillery batteries in Arica's harbor once it was returned by Chile. Furthermore, Arica was to be limited to commercial use only. Celae planned to retain all the territories of Moquegua, Tacna, and Arica until all peace treaty conditions were satisfied. Although willing to accept the negotiated settlement, Peru and Bolivia insisted that Chile withdraw its forces from all occupied lands as a precondition for discussing peace. Having captured this territory at great expense, Chile refused to accept these terms and the negotiations failed.

=== Lynch's Expedition ===
To show Peru the futility of further resistance against Chilean forces, on 4 September 1880 the Chilean government dispatched an expedition of 2,200 men to northern Peru under the command of Captain Patricio Lynch to collect war taxes from wealthy landowners. Lynch's Expedition arrived on 10 September to Chimbote levied taxes of $100,000 in Chimbote, $10,000 in Piata, $20,000 in Chiclayo, and $4,000 in Lambayeque in local currencies; those who did not comply had their property impounded or destroyed. On September 11, 1880, the Peruvian government made a decree that made the payment of these taxes an act of treason, but most land owners still paid the Chileans under the belief that denizens of occupied areas had to comply with the occupying army.

=== Campaign of Lima ===
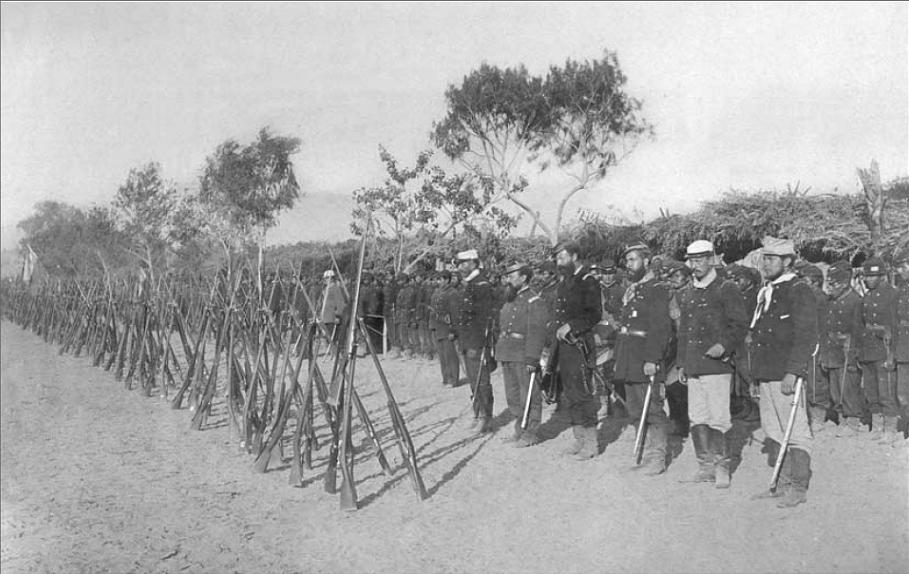
Infantry regiment of the Chilean Army, formed in Lurín, south of Lima, in January 1881

After the campaign of Tacna and Arica, the southern departments of Peru were in Chilean hands, and the allies armies were smashed, so for the Chilean government there was no reason to continue the war. However, public pressure as well as expansionist ambitions pushed the war farther north. The defeated allies not only didn't realize their situation, but despite the empty Bolivian treasury, on 16 June 1880 the National Assembly voted in favour of a continuation of the war and on 11 June 1880 was signed in Peru a document declaring the creation of the United States of Peru-Bolivia.

This forced both the Chilean government and its high command to plan a new campaign with the objective to obtain an unconditional capitulation at the Peruvian capital city.

The Chilean forces would have to confront virtually the entire male population of Lima defending prepared positions and supported by a formidable collection of the coastal guns of Lima, located within a few miles of the capital's arsenal and supply depots. President Pierola ordered the construction of two parallel lines of defenses at Chorrillos and Miraflores a few kilometers south of Lima. The line of Chorrillos had 10 miles (16 km) long, lying from Marcavilca hill to La Chira, passing through the acclivities of San Juan and Santa Teresa. The Peruvian forces were approximately 26,000 men strong between Arequipa and Lima.

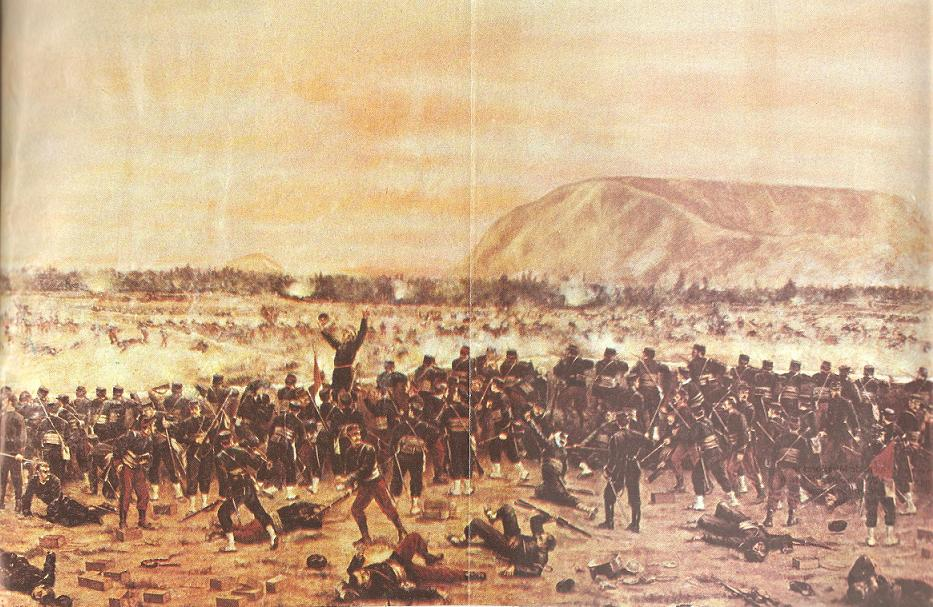
"The Third Fort" by Juan Lepiani, one of the Peruvian strongholds in the Miraflores

A small Chilean force went ashore near Pisco, approximately 200 miles (320 km) south of Lima, and the mass of the army disembarked in Chilca only 45 kilometres (28 mi) from Lima.

On January 13, 1881, the 20,000 Chilean troops charged 14,000 Peruvian defenders in Chorrillos. During the Battle of Chorrillos, the Chileans inflicted a harsh defeat to the Peruvian army and eliminated the first defensive line guarding Lima. Two days later, on January 15, 1881, after the triumph in the Battle of Miraflores the Chilean army entered Lima.

After the battle there were fires and sackings in the towns of Chorrillos and Barranco.

==== Occupation of Lima ====
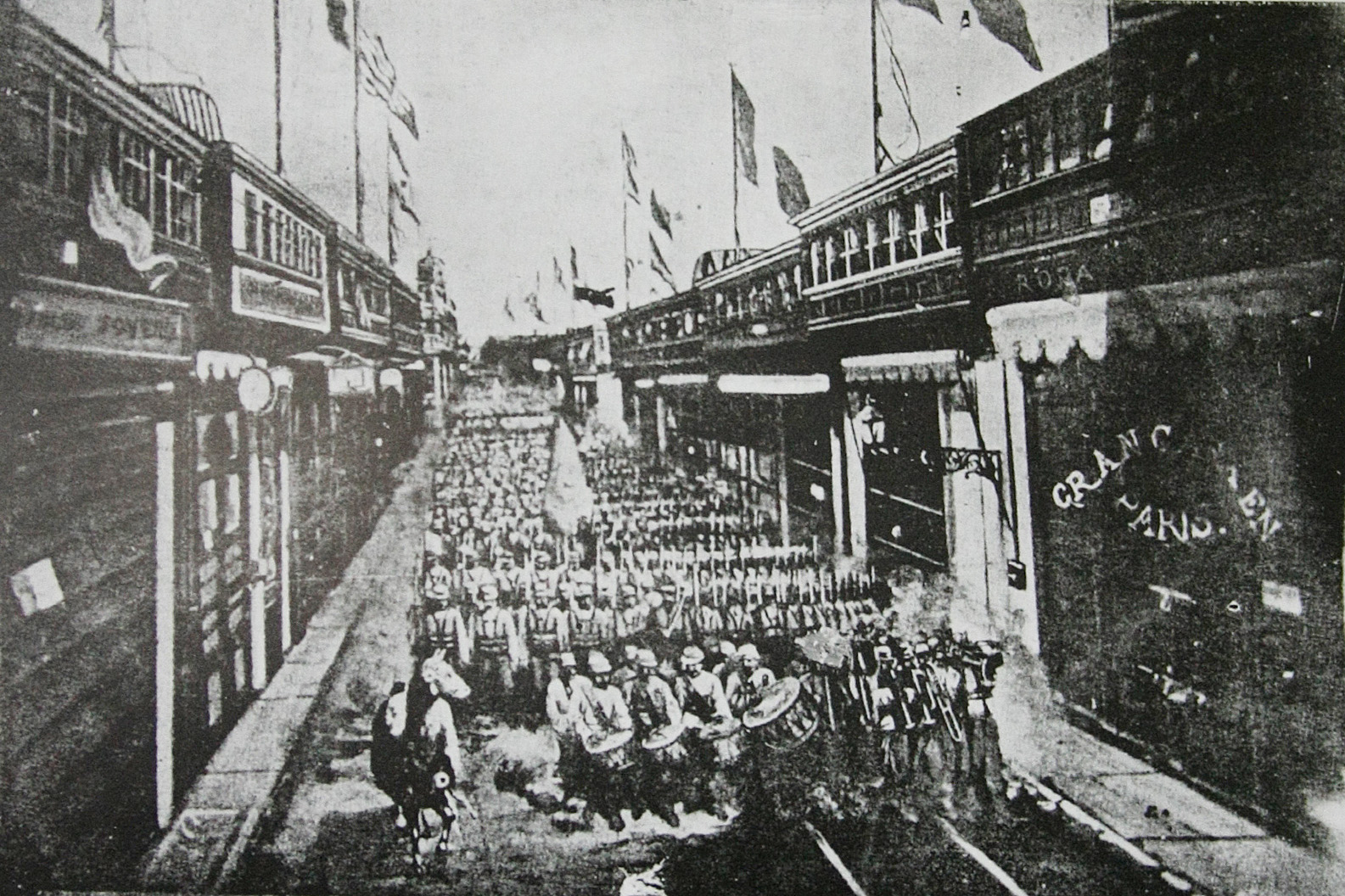
Chilean army entering Lima.

During the occupation of Lima, Chilean troops systematically pillaged Peruvian public buildings, turned the old University of San Marcos into a barracks, raided medical schools and other institutions of education, and stole a series of monuments and artwork that had adorned the city. The Chilean Army plundered the contents of the Peruvian National Library in Lima and transported thousands of books (including many centuries-old original Spanish, Peruvian and Colonial volumes) to Santiago de Chile, along with much capital stock. In November 2007 3,778 books were returned to the National Library of Peru.

=== Occupation of Peru ===
Chileans troops entered Lima on 17 January 1881. The Peruvian dictator Nicolás de Piérola retreated from the capital to try governing from the rear area, and he still refused to accept Chile's demand for territory and indemnity.

In absence of a Peruvian president who was willing to accept their peace terms, on February 22, 1881, the Chileans allowed a convention of Peruvian "notables" outside of Lima that elected Francisco García Calderón as president. Garcia Calderón was allowed to raise and arm two infantry battalions (400 men each) and two small cavalry squadrons to give more legitimacy to the provisional government.

The commander of the Chilean occupation, Vice-admiral Patricio Lynch, set down his military headquarters in the Government Palace of Peru in Lima. After the confrontations in San Juan and Miraflores, Peruvian Colonel Andrés Avelino Cáceres decided to escape to the central Andes to organize and reinitiate the Peruvian resistance to the Chilean occupation army from within the mountain range. This would come to be known as the campaign of the Breña or Sierra, which organized abundant acts of rebellion in Lima and eventually organized a widespread Peruvian resistance.

Meanwhile, in Chile the new administration under the command of Domingo Santa Maria pushed for an end to the costly war.

==== Letelier's expedition ====
In February 1881, the Chilean forces under the command of Lt. Col. Ambrosio Letelier started the first Expedition, with 700 men, to defeat the last guerilla bands from Huánuco (30 April) to Junín. After many losses the expedition achieved very little and came back to Lima in early July, where Letelier and his officers were court-martialed because they illegally diverted money into their own pocket.

=== Campaign of the Breña or Sierra ===
With apparent encouragement from the United States, Peruvians kept up the resistance for three more years in a campaign known in Peru as the campaign of the Breña. The leader of the resistance was General Andrés Avelino Cáceres (nicknamed the Warlock of the Andes), who would later be elected president of Peru. Cáceres's troops faced against the better equipped and armed Chilean troops with the usage of archaic weaponry such as machetes, spears, clubs, stones, and few old muskets. Under his leadership, the Peruvian militia forces strengthened with Native American montoneros inflicted several blows upon the Chilean army in small battles such as Pucará, Marcavalle, Concepción, and Tarmatambo, forcing Colonel Estanislao del Canto's division to return to Lima in 1882.

Chile would once again attempt to dominate the region by sending another campaign force, but the Chilean troops were defeated at the battles of Chicla and Purhuay. However, Cáceres was conclusively defeated by Colonel Alejandro Gorostiaga at the Battle of Huamachuco on 10 July 1883. Even still, without any major forces left to continue the resistance, Cáceres managed to keep Chileans on the retreat at Ayacucho. Finally, after the Peruvian victory at the Battle of San Pablo, Colonel Miguel Iglesias manages to reach a diplomatic solution with Chile on 20 October 1883 with the signing of the Treaty of Ancón, by which Peru's Tarapacá province was ceded to the victor; on its part, Bolivia was forced to cede Antofagasta. Nonetheless, the treaty would not come into official effect until 8 March 1884. During the time prior to that date, Chilean troops occupied the city of Arequipa after an uprising forced the puppet regime of Lizardo Montero to flee to La Paz, Bolivia. Afterwards, the Battle of Pachía, on 11 November 1883, forced the Chileans to retreat to Moquegua. Despite the Peruvian victory, the lack of resources and manpower forced the Peruvian advances in Tacna to stop.

==== First campaign of La Sierra ====
To annihilate the guerrilla, Lynch started in January 1882 a new offensive with 5,000 men first in the direction of Tarma and then southeast: Huancayo, until Izcuchaca. The Chilean troops suffered enormous hardships: cold, snow, mountain sickness (more than 5,000m). On 9 July 1882 was fought the emblematic Battle of La Concepción. The Chileans had to pull back with a loss of 534 soldiers: 154 died in combat, 277 died to disease and 103 deserted.

==== Rise of Miguel Iglesias ====
During the administration of James A. Garfield (Mar. 4, 1881 – Sep. 19, 1881) in the US, the anglophobic Secretary of State James G. Blaine wanted to advance the US presence in Latin America. He believed that England had prodded Chile into war on Peru to secure England's stake in the mineral wealth of the disputed areas. Blaine made a proposal that called for Chile to accept a monetary indemnity and renounce claims to Antofagasta and Tarapacá. These American attempts reinforced Garcia Calderon's refusal to discuss the matter of territorial cession. When it became known that Blaine's representative to Garcia Calderon, Stephen Hurlburt, would personally profit from the business trade-off, it was clear that Hurlburt was complicating the peace process.

Because of President Calderon's refusal to relinquish Peruvian control over Tarapacá, he was placed under arrest. Before Garcia Calderon left Peru for Chile, he named Admiral Lizardo Montero as successor. At the same time President Pierola stepped back and supported Avelino Caceres for the Presidency of Peru. Caceres refused to serve and supported Lizardo Montero instead. Montero moved to Arequipa and in this way Garcia Calderon's arrest achieved the union of the forces of Pierola and Caceres.

Frederick Theodore Frelinghuysen, successor to Blaine as US Secretary of State after the assassination of President Garfield, publicly disavowed Blaine's policy while abandoning any notion of intervening militarily in the dispute and recognizing Chile's right to annex Tarapacá.

On 1 April 1882 Miguel Iglesias, former Defence minister under Pierola, became convinced that the war had to be brought to an end if Peru was not to be completely devastated. He issued a manifesto, "Grito de Montan", calling for peace and in December 1882 called a convention of representatives of the seven departments of northern Peru where he was elected "Regenerating President"

==== Second campaign of La Sierra ====
To protect and support Iglesias against Montero, on 6 April 1883, Patricio Lynch started a new offensive to drive the Montoneros from central Peru and destroy Caceres' little army. Unlike in previous plans, the Chilean troops pursued Caceres to northwest through narrow mountain passes until 10 July 1883 as the definitive Battle of Huamachuco was fought. The Peruvians were defeated. It was the last battle of the war.

=== End of occupation ===
After the signing of the peace on 20 October 1883 with the government of Iglesias, Lizardo Montero tried to resist in Arequipa, but fortunately for Chile, the arrival of its men stampeded Montero's troops and Montero went for a Bolivian asylum.

On 29 October 1883 ended the Chilean occupation of Lima.

=== Campaign of Lima ===
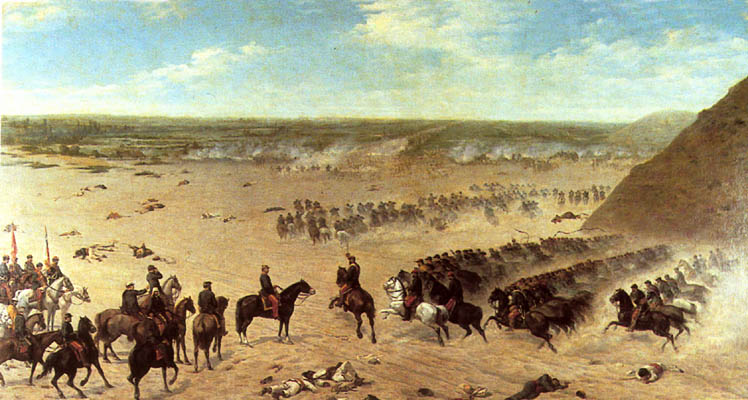
Chilean charge during the Battle of San Juan.

19 November 1880 the Chilean army landed in Pisco, and by January 1881, the Chileans were marching towards the Peruvian capital, Lima. Regular Peruvian forces together with poorly armed people, set up to defend Lima. With little effective Peruvian central government remaining, Chile pursued an ambitious campaign throughout Peru, especially along the coast and in the central Sierra, penetrating as far north as Cajamarca, seeking to eliminate any source of resistance. Peruvian forces were decisively defeated in the battles of San Juan and Miraflores, and Lima fell in January 1881 to the forces of General Baquedano.
The southern suburbs of Lima, including the upscale beach area of Chorrillos, were looted by demoralized Peruvian soldiers

== See also ==
- War of the Pacific
