= Moquehua =

- Town
- Location within Buenos Aires Province
- Coordinates: 35°05′S 59°47′W
- Country: Argentina
- Province: Buenos Aires
- Partidos: Chivilcoy
- Established: March 1, 1909
- Elevation: 38 m (125 ft)

Population (2001 Census)
  - Total: 2,223
- Time zone: UTC−3 (ART)
- CPA Base: B 6625
- Climate: Dfc

Moquehua is a town located in the Chivilcoy Partido in the province of Buenos Aires, Argentina.

== Etymology ==
The origin of the town's name is uncertain, possibly translating to "heap of corn" in the Mapuche language. It also possibly may be a tribute to a soldier who fought in the Argentine Wars of Independence.

== Geography ==
Moquehua is located 40 km (25 mi) from the town of Chivilcoy and 194 km (121 mi) from the city of Buenos Aires.

== History ==
The area making up the town was settled by Europeans in the 19th century, before its founding. Moquehua was founded on March 1, 1909, following the construction of a rail station, which was founded a year earlier in 1908. The station today is a museum. A chapel was constructed in the town in 1930, and it was elevated to the status of a parish in 1954. Provincial Route 30, which today runs through the town, was constructed in 1987.

== Population ==
According to INDEC, which collects population data for the country, the town had a population of 2,223 people as of the 2001 census.
