= Chivilcoy Partido =

Chivilcoy Partido de Chivilcoy
- Department
- Coordinates: 34°54′S 60°02′W
- Country: Argentina
- Established: December 28, 1845
- Seat: Chivilcoy

Government
  - Intendant: Guillermo Britos (CF)

Area
  - Total: 2,075 km^{2} (801 sq mi)

Population
  - Total: 60,762
  - Density: 29.28/km^{2} (75.84/sq mi)
- Demonym: chivilcoyense
- Postal Code: B6620
- IFAM: BUE026
- Area Code: 02346
- Website: chivilcoy.gov.ar

Chivilcoy Partido is a partido in the northern area of Buenos Aires Province in Argentina.

The provincial subdivision has a population of about 60,000 inhabitants in an area of 2,075 km^{2} (801 sq mi), and its capital city is Chivilcoy.

== Settlements ==
- Chivilcoy
- Moquehua
- Gorostiaga
- Emilio Ayarza
- La Rica
- San Sebastián
- Benítez
- Henry Bell
- Indacochea
- Palemon Huergo
- Ramón Biaus
