= Battle of Locumba =

- Part of the Tacna and Arica campaign of the War of the Pacific
Date	April 1, 1880
Location	Locumba, Tacna, Peru
Result	Peruvian victory

Belligerents
Peru	Chile

Commanders and leaders
Gregorio Albarracín	Diego D. Almeyda

Strength
150 Infantry	30 Cavalry

Casualties and losses
None	8 killed, 18 captured

The Battle of Locumba was a battle of the Tacna and Arica campaign of the War of the Pacific that took place on April 1, 1880, between the Chilean cavalry and the Peruvian garrison at the town.

== Background ==
After the Chilean landing in Ilo and Pacocha, the Chilean command ordered to take positions towards the interior of Moquegua and Tacna, in order to ensure communication routes with the interior and to guard against movements of the Peruvian army, as well as disorienting its command over the immediate objective of the Chilean expeditionary army. In March 1880, Baquedano sent 60 men to Chironta, 30 to Locumba, and 60 to Cinto.

In November 1879, Rear Admiral Lizardo Montero took command of the Peruvian army in Tacna and once the Chilean landing was known, he sent Colonel Gregorio Albarracín in command of the Flankers of Tacna to carry out reconnaissance and harassment actions against the Chilean troops.

According to the diary of Alberto del Solar:

The following data were known, however, in the headquarters -and even we knew them-: the famous Albarracín, well mounted and with not inconsiderable cavalry forces, prowled around the surroundings: his main objective was to destroy the elements that could be us of some use; their desire, luring us into ambushes and attacking us by surprise...

== The Battle ==
After the Battle of Los Angeles, an outpost composed of 30 men, under the command of Commander Diego Dublé Almeyda, left Pacocha on March 31. In Camiara, he met some Chinese workers who had risen up and it was reported that Albarracín was east of Locumba.

He then arrived at a neighboring farm to Locumba and meets an Italian who tells him that there were no Peruvian forces in the town and that they could occupy it without resistance, which was later verified by Captain Rojas Almeida. This allowed the men of Dublé Almeyda to initially enter the town.

The Chilean author Vicuña Mackenna states that they agreed to have lunch with an individual who called himself the local priest, and some neighbors who also verified that the Chileans were free to occupy the town. They left their horses in the plaza in the charge of a sergeant, and having lookouts posted, they entered the house. Shortly after entering, shots were fired at the officers and soldiers who were residing in the square.

Colonel Gregorio Albarracín's report indicates that on April 1 Juan McLean informed him that a Chilean column was in Chironta and that Celestino Vargas had been captured, so Albarracín decided to go to the town of Locumba where he attacked the Chileans that stationed in the town.

Dublé Almeyda and three soldiers managed to mount and evade the confrontation, managing to reach Moquegua. Eight Chileans were killed and the rest were prisoners of war who were sent to Tacna and then La Paz.

== Aftermath ==
On April 10, a force of 750 Chileans set out to look for Gregorio Albarracín, but couldn't find him in Locumba. Other battles were fought with the local guerrillas. On May 2, 1880, the town of Locumba was set on fire by Colonel Lisandro Orrego, head of the Santiago regiment.

Commander Dublé surrendered to the Chilean high command to be tried in a court martial but got acquitted of the charges thanks to the efficient defense made by his brother Baldomero.
