= Locumba =

City in Peru

- Town
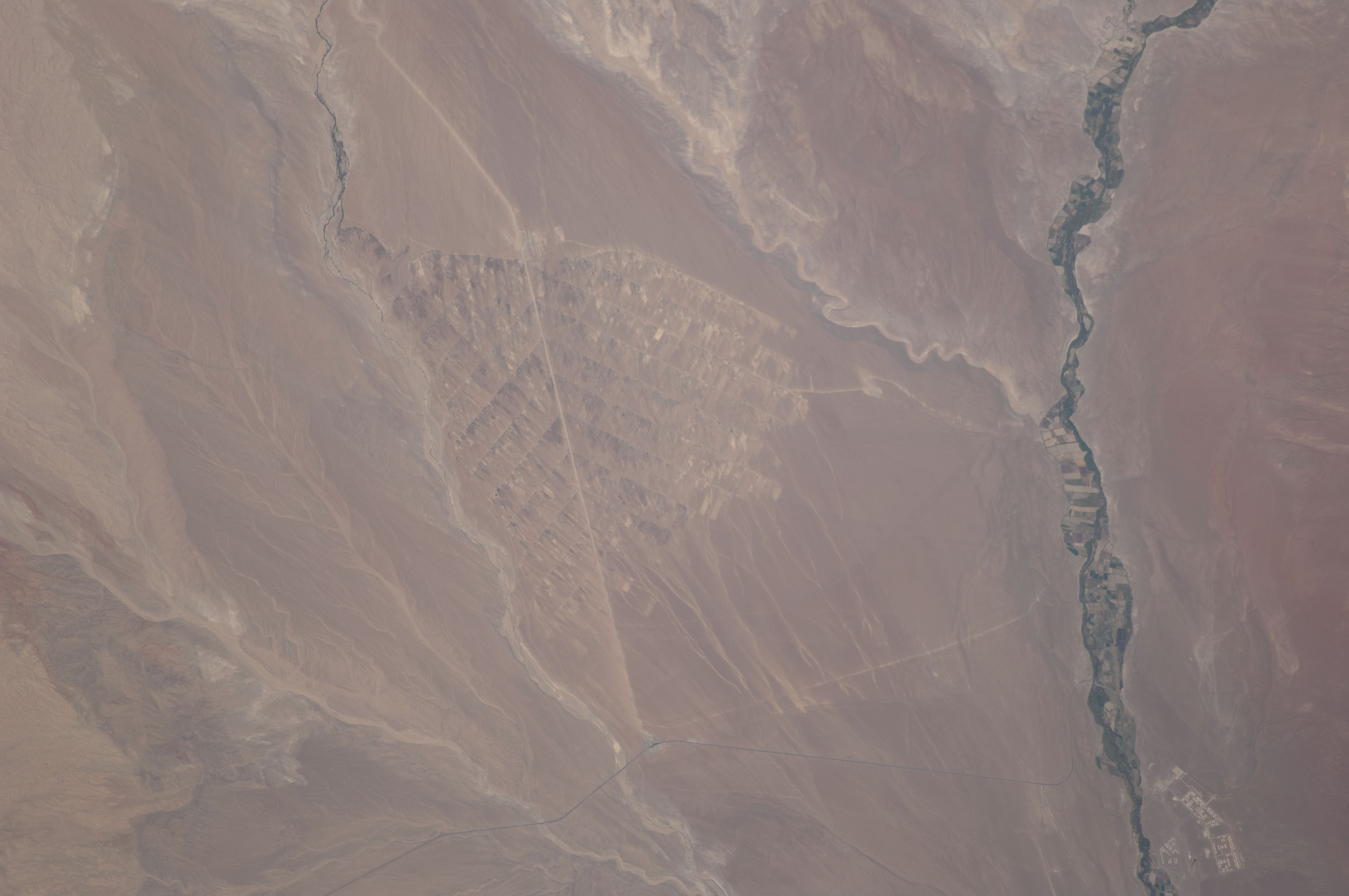
- Satellite view of Locumba and surroundings

- Location within Peru
- Coordinates: 17°36′49.81″S 70°45′45.05″W
- Country: Peru
- Region: Tacna
- Province: Jorge Basadre
- District: Locumba

Government
  - Type: Municipality
  - Mayor: Julio Dávalos Flores
- Time zone: UTC-5 (PET)

Locumba is a town in southern Peru. It is the capital of the district of the same name and of Jorge Basadre province, located in the department of Tacna.

== History ==
In 1880, it was the site of a battle against Chile during the War of the Pacific. On April 1, 1884, Miguel Iglesias created the department of Moquegua, incorporating Tacna's districts of Locumba and Ilabaya. Three years later, Andrés Avelino Cáceres declared the law null and void, with the districts returning to their original jurisdiction.

On January 10, 1890, a Supreme Resolution designated the town as the capital of the province and department of Free Tacna, a name that would apply to the non-occupied area north of Sama River for the remainder of the dispute. At the time, the town had a population of 300 inhabitants.

In 2000, it was the site of an unsuccessful military uprising.

== Politics ==
The town, a district and provincial capital, is administered by a municipal government. The local government is served by a mayor.

=== List of mayors ===
Since 2023, the incumbent mayor is Julio Dávalos Flores.

Mayor	Party	Term	
Mayor	Party	Begin	End
Jorge Eyzaguirre Martínez	APRA	1990	1992
Jorge Eyzaguirre Martínez	APRA	1993	1995
Julio Dávalos Flores	Lista Independiente № 13	1996	1998
Julio Dávalos Flores	Frente Independiente Agrario	1999	2002
Julio Dávalos Flores	—N/a	2003	2006
Julio Dávalos Flores	APRA	2007	2010
José Málaga Cutipe	Lista Independiente Recuperemos Tacna	2011	2014
Manuel Raúl Oviedo Palacios	Partido Humanista Peruano	2015	2018
Félix Fredy Morales Mamani	Alianza para el Progreso	2019	2022
Julio Dávalos Flores	Avanza País	2023	Incumbent

== Geography ==
=== Climate ===
Climate data for Locumba, elevation 560 m (1,840 ft), (1991–2020)
Month	Jan	Feb	Mar	Apr	May	Jun	Jul	Aug	Sep	Oct	Nov	Dec	Year
Mean daily maximum °C (°F)	30.5 (86.9)	30.9 (87.6)	30.4 (86.7)	28.4 (83.1)	26.1 (79.0)	23.5 (74.3)	23.0 (73.4)	24.0 (75.2)	25.6 (78.1)	27.2 (81.0)	28.3 (82.9)	29.6 (85.3)	27.3 (81.1)
Mean daily minimum °C (°F)	16.7 (62.1)	16.7 (62.1)	15.6 (60.1)	13.0 (55.4)	10.3 (50.5)	8.6 (47.5)	8.3 (46.9)	9.0 (48.2)	9.8 (49.6)	11.3 (52.3)	12.7 (54.9)	14.9 (58.8)	12.2 (54.0)
Average precipitation mm (inches)	0.6 (0.02)	0.4 (0.02)	0.2 (0.01)	0.2 (0.01)	0.1 (0.00)	0.1 (0.00)	0.2 (0.01)	0.2 (0.01)	0.2 (0.01)	0.0 (0.0)	0.0 (0.0)	0.1 (0.00)	2.3 (0.09)
Source: National Meteorology and Hydrology Service of Peru

== See also ==
- Department of Tacna § History
