= Chivilcoy =

City in Buenos Aires Province, Argentina

- City
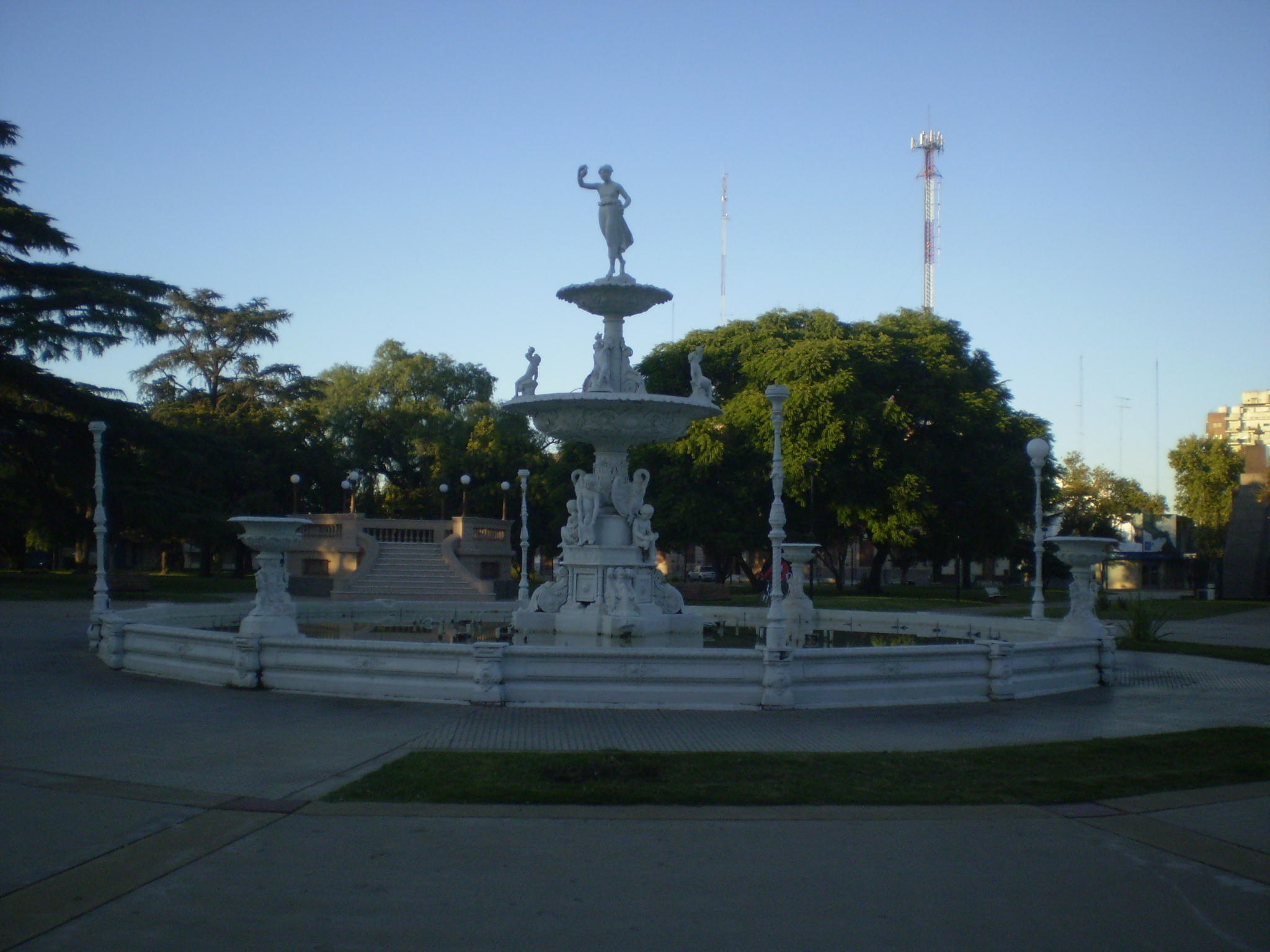

- Location in Argentina
- Coordinates: 34°54′S 60°01′W
- Country: Argentina
- Province: Buenos Aires
- Partido: Chivilcoy
- Founded: October 22, 1854
- Elevation: 66 m (217 ft)

Population (2010 census)
  - Total: 58,152
- CPA Base: B 6620
- Area code: +54 2346
- Website: Official website

Chivilcoy is a city in Buenos Aires Province, Argentina, the head town of the Chivilcoy Partido. It has 64,185 inhabitants according to the 2010 census [INDEC].

== Tourism ==
=== February Carnivals ===
In the month of February, a three-day carnival is held over an extended weekend, beginning on Friday and ending on Sunday. During the carnival, local murgas, batucadas, and carnival troupes from other provinces and nearby towns participate and perform.

=== Alejandro Martija Lakeside Park ===
At the intersection of RP 30 y RP 51 is the Alejandro Martija lakeside park, a recreational area that includes soccer and volleyball fields, swimming pools, playground equipment, changing rooms, warm showers, and bathrooms. Dedicated campsites and picnic areas are also available, as well as a dock for fishing.

=== Southern Skies Astronomy Theme Park ===
The Southern Skies Astronomy theme park is an educational park located on 22 de Octubre Avenue, between the streets Galván and Benítez whose purpose is “to help expand the scientific literacy of the population.” It includes a walking path with a variety of interactive elements, intended to engage visitors and help them experiment, relax, and learn. The main building is of a cylindrical shape, and includes wheelchair access to its rooftop, functioning as an observatory. There is also an arrangement of benches at the park that are oriented such that they can help you identify the constellations present on the night of your birth.

== Twin towns ==
- Italy, Menfi, 1999
