= Ite District =

Ite
- District
- Location of Ite in the Jorge Basadre Province
- Coordinates: 17°31′27″S 70°34′32″W
- Country: Peru
- Region: Tacna
- Province: Jorge Basadre
- Founded: June 12, 1961
- Capital: Ite

Government
  - Mayor: Pablo Ysaul Rivera Chavez

Area
  - Total: 848.34 km^{2} (327.55 sq mi)
- Elevation: 175 m (574 ft)

Population (2005 census)
  - Total: 1,763
  - Density: 2.078/km^{2} (5.382/sq mi)
- Time zone: UTC-5 (PET)
- UBIGEO: 230303

Ite District is one of three districts of the province Jorge Basadre in Peru.

== Climate ==
Climate data for Ite, elevation 160 m (520 ft), (1991–2020)
| Month | Jan | Feb | Mar | Apr | May | Jun | Jul | Aug | Sep | Oct | Nov | Dec | Year |
|---|---|---|---|---|---|---|---|---|---|---|---|---|---|
| Mean daily maximum °C (°F) | 26.1 (79.0) | 26.8 (80.2) | 25.9 (78.6) | 23.8 (74.8) | 21.4 (70.5) | 19.4 (66.9) | 18.1 (64.6) | 18.0 (64.4) | 18.6 (65.5) | 20.2 (68.4) | 22.3 (72.1) | 24.3 (75.7) | 22.1 (71.7) |
| Mean daily minimum °C (°F) | 20.2 (68.4) | 20.6 (69.1) | 19.5 (67.1) | 17.5 (63.5) | 15.6 (60.1) | 14.0 (57.2) | 13.2 (55.8) | 13.0 (55.4) | 13.6 (56.5) | 15.0 (59.0) | 16.8 (62.2) | 18.6 (65.5) | 16.5 (61.7) |
| Average precipitation mm (inches) | 2.3 (0.09) | 0.1 (0.00) | 0.1 (0.00) | 0.1 (0.00) | 0.2 (0.01) | 0.7 (0.03) | 2.3 (0.09) | 1.9 (0.07) | 2.8 (0.11) | 1.1 (0.04) | 0.6 (0.02) | 0.5 (0.02) | 12.7 (0.48) |
Source: National Meteorology and Hydrology Service of Peru
