= Gorostiaga, Buenos Aires =

Gorostiaga
- Town
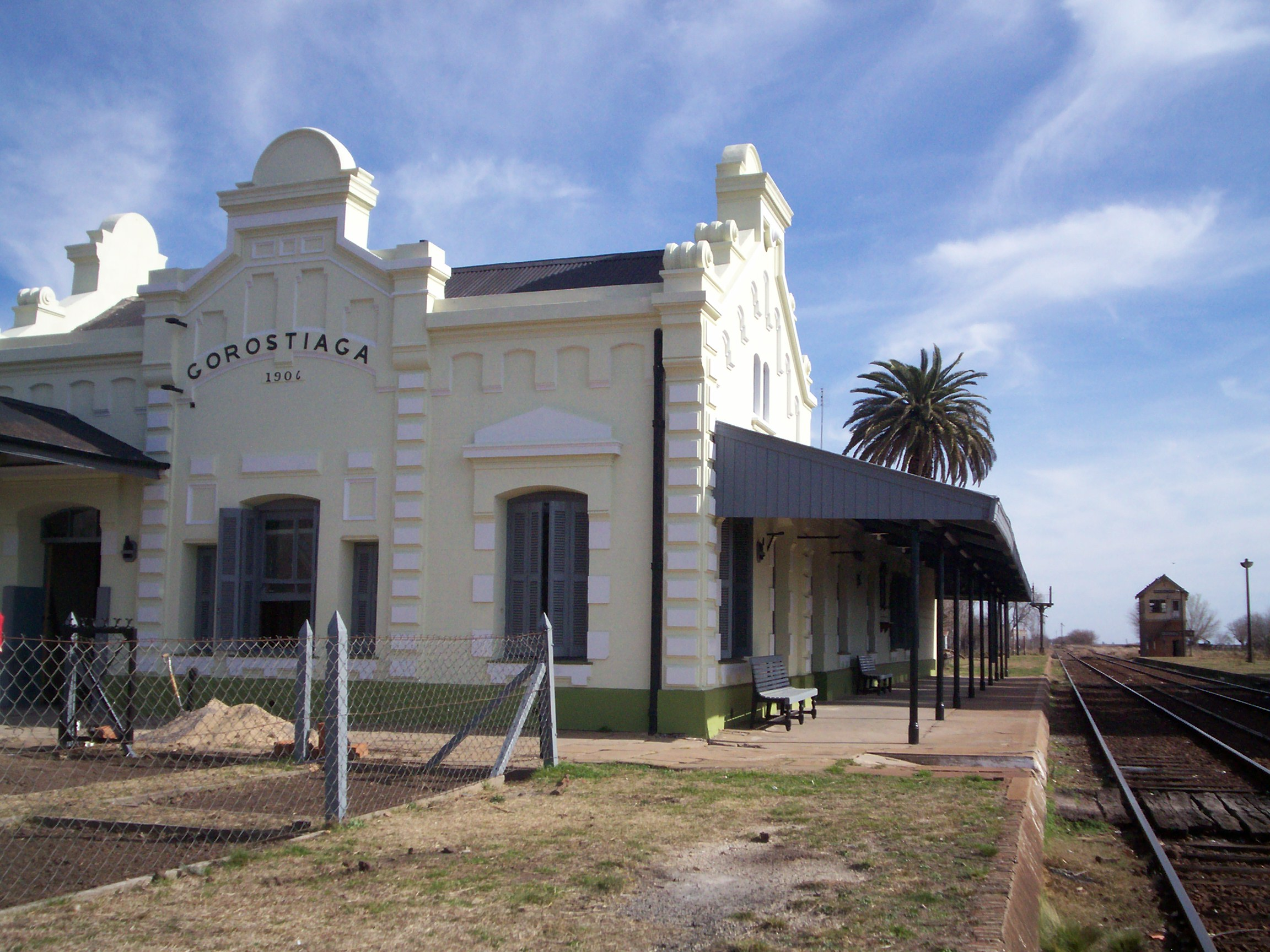
- Rail station

- Location within Buenos Aires Province
- Coordinates: 34°49′S 59°52′W
- Country: Argentina
- Province: Buenos Aires
- Partidos: Chivilcoy
- Established: September 11, 1910
- Elevation: 54 m (177 ft)

Population (2001 Census)
  - Total: 386
- Time zone: UTC−3 (ART)
- CPA Base: B 6632
- Area code: +291 457-XXXX
- Climate: Dfc

Gorostiaga is a town located in the Chivilcoy Partido in the province of Buenos Aires, Argentina.

== History ==
Gorostiaga was founded as a town on September 11, 1910, from part of the lands subdivided from a female landowner following her death. A railway station had already been built in the town 50 years prior in 1866 by the Ferrocarril Oeste. Plans for the creation of a town had been proposed as early as 1904 by the heirs of the owners of the land that would become Gorostiaga. Passenger rail service to the town ended in 2015.

== Population ==
According to INDEC, which collects population data for the country, the town had a population of 386 people as of the 2001 census.
