= Tacna and Arica campaign =

Part of the War of the Pacific (1879–1880)

- Part of War of the Pacific
- Movements and battles during the Tacna and Arica campaign.
Date	December 1879 – July 1880
Location	Department of Tacna and Province of Arica, Peru (Arica currently from Chile)
Result	Chilean victory: Chile obtains control of the territories of Tacna and Arica.

Belligerents
Chile	Peru; Bolivia

Commanders and leaders
(Chile) Erasmo Escala (Chile) Manuel Baquedano (Chile) Pedro Lagos (Chile) José Vergara (Chile) Tomás Yávar (Chile) Diego Almeyda	(Peru) Lizardo Flores; Gregorio Albarracín (Peru) Francisco Bolognesi † (Peru) Andrés Gamarra (Bolivia) Narciso Campero

The Tacna and Arica campaign is known as the stage of the War of the Pacific after the Chilean conquest of the Peruvian department of Tarapacá, ending with Chilean domination of the Moquegua department in southern Peru. During this campaign Bolivia retired from the war after the Battle of Tacna, and Peru lost the port of Arica. Also, Manuel Baquedano assumed command as the new Commander in Chief of the Chilean Army, and the Allied Presidents were thrown out of office and replaced by Nicolas de Pierola in Peru and General Narciso Campero in Bolivia.

== Background ==
=== Tarapacá Campaign ===
After Chile secured the sea with the victory at Angamos on October 8, 1879, the Chilean army prepared to assault Tarapacá Province. An amphibious operation was launched at Pisagua on November 2, pushing the Allies inland and obtaining an unshipping point to unload troops and material. Right after Pisagua, two Allied squadrons were slightly outnumbered and crushed at Pampa Germania on November 6, and Col. Emilio Sotomayor held off a 7,400 men Allied attack on November 19 at Dolores dwell, near San Francisco. The string of victories made the Chilean commanders too confident, and with poor information recklessly attacked the outnumbering Peruvian army at Tarapacá on November 27, suffering a heavy defeat. Nevertheless, the Allies withdrew from Tarapacá department, leaving it in Chilean hands.

==== Chilean situation ====
Once they had gained the Tarapacá department, the saltpetre trade earnings went directly to the Chilean government, making the war effort much easier by allowing the purchase of supplies needed for the growing army. Chilean President Anibal Pinto sought to own the saltpetre factories, judging it safer to interpose Bolivia between Chile and Peru, and therefore prepared an invasion to Moquegua department in order to conquer Tacna and Arica, with the ultimate aim of ceding them to Bolivia. In the meantime, Gen. Erasmo Escala resigned his commission as Commander in Chief due to constant and bitter arguments with War Minister Rafael Sotomayor, who then replaced him with Gen. Manuel Baquedano, a Peru-Bolivian Confederacy war veteran.

==== Allied situation ====
The loss of Tarapacá generated popular discontent in Peru and in Bolivia, resulting in the deposition of Mariano Ignacio Prado and Hilarión Daza, who were replaced by Nicolas de Pierola and General Narciso Campero. Internal disputes arose between the Allies trying to decide who should lead the army. Finally Gen. Campero was appointed as the commander of the Allied forces, which totaled about 11,000 men.

The Allies ceded the initiative to Chile, allowing her to choose the ensuing course of the campaign. With the Chilean domination of the sea so complete after the earlier battles, the Allies had no manoeuvre space for transporting huge contingents from north to south and vice versa. This also created extreme difficulties in terms of reinforcing the artillery, weaponry, and other supplies of war.

Pierola did not mobilize the Second Southern Army in Arequipa to aid Montero at Tacna, and also replaced Peruvian officers with loyal civilians, resulting in a virtual crippling of the army command.

== The beginning ==
=== Disembark at Ilo and Pacocha ===
By the end of December 1879, the Chilean army decided to send a division in a scout expedition to Ilo and Pacocha in order to eliminate the Peruvian resistance in the area and to try to take enemy's supplies, with the order of making plans for a possible attack. The Chilean division was put under Lt. Col Arístides Martínez, and was formed by 500 men of the Lautaro Battalion and 12 riders of the Granaderos a Caballo Regiment.

The Peruvian forces had been gathered at Tacna and Arica, so in order to make a successful attack the entire Chilean army to a place near both cities, avoiding crossing the Atacama Desert.

On December 31, the Chilean troops disembarked and quickly took the port of Ilo, isolating Moquegua garrison of 1,300 soldiers and letting Martinez to move freely in the area, fulfilling the task commended. The expedition returned to Ilo the very next day and was re-embarked to Pisagua.

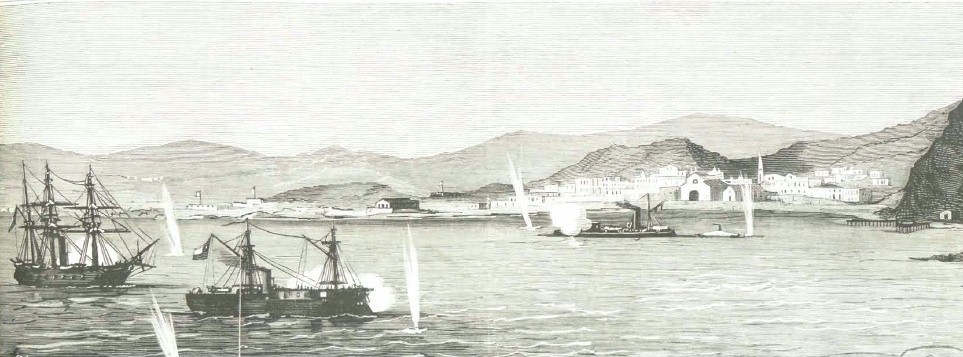
Drawing of the blockade of Arica

Between February 18 and 25, a twenty ship convoy unshipped 9,500 men divided into three divisions, while another one stood in Pisagua waiting the convoy to return. Simultaneously, the Peruvian port of Arica was put under a naval blockade by the warships Huascar and Magallanes.

By the early days of March, another Chilean expedition under Col. Orozimbo Barbosa was sent to Mollendo, where 4,000 men were stationed. While the expedition was at sea, the garrison marched to Arequipa, leaving only 100 soldiers. The Navales Battalion occupied the town on March 8 without any skirmishes. On March 17, the Peruvian vessel Union made through the blockade unloading supplies to the garrison of Arica. The same day Baquedano occupied Moquegua while the first division of Montero's Southern Army under Col. Andres Gamarra withdrew to Los Angeles hill, seeking to assume a position easy to defend. Baquedano with 4,500 men marched over Los Angeles on March 20.

=== Los Ángeles ===
Before the sunrise of March 22, 1880, while the 2nd Line and Santiago regiments attacked the sector of Quilin Quilin, the Atacama Battalion climbed the slope of Guaneros and caught the Peruvians from the rear, bayoneting them off their tactically superior positions. This forced the rest of the Allied soldiers to withdraw as well. On April, the Peruvian port of Callao was put under blockade, and at Locumba, a Chilean column forced some Peruvian forces under Gregorio Albarracin to retreat. Sotomayor resolved to move the entire army to Tacna, leaving Moquegua alone, not considering the Arequipa garrison at all. The Chilean army converged over the Sama river valley, set as a starting point to march across the desert towards Tacna, but the artillery was shipped to Ite. On May 20, Rafael Sotomayor died of a stroke at Las Yaras, and Jose Francisco Vergara was designed as his replacement. With Sotomayor's death, the army command was put under Gen. Baquedano. The Allies didn't molest the Chilean march through the desert due to internal disputes between Campero and Camacho and the lack of supplies and transportation lines. A last attempt to ambush the Chileans on the night of May 25 at Quebrada Honda failed, because the darkness misled a column led by Campero, tiring his troops in vain.

=== Tacna ===
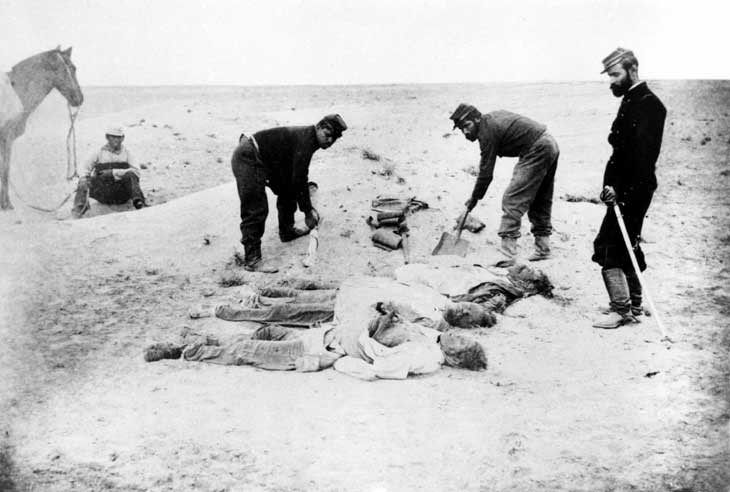
Burying the dead after the Battle of Tacna

On May 26, after useless artillery cross fire, the divisions on the front line under Amengual and Barceló engaged separately the Allied defensive line at the Intiorko Hill plateau. The poor Chilean coordination allowed Gen. Campero to send the reserve from the centre and the right to help Camacho's left flank, managing to contain the assault. Castro Pinto's centre line endured the attack too, forcing both Chilean divisions to retreat when their ammunitions ran out. Even more, the Aroma, Zepita, and Alianza battalions persecuted Amengual, causing heavy casualties. The same thing occurred with Barceló, and both divisions mixed in the retreat. Baquedano sent Amunategui's division to strengthen the retiring units, and simultaneously a cavalry charge stopped the Allied charge on the left flank.

Afterwards, Barbosa's division forwarded to the weakened Allied right flank, putting pressure on the entire Allied line. Barbosa's men assailed and took the artillery placed on this area, meanwhile the combined attack of the three divisions progressed with intense volleys. Several battalions were surrounded and vanquished in the advance. When the Chileans came very close, rushed the Allied centre and the left wing in a melee, and chased the retiring soldiers to Tacna. The Bolivian army were so crippled that retired to the mountains and never fought in the war again, breaking the Peru-Bolivian Alliance forever.

=== Arica ===
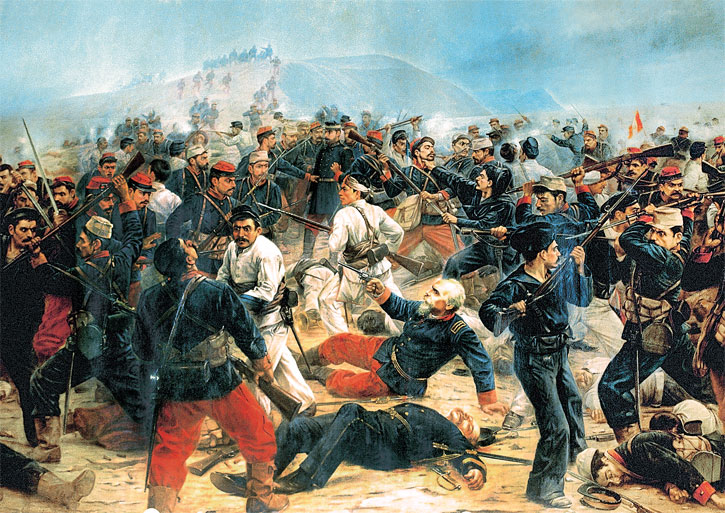
Depiction of the Battle of Arica by Juan Lepiani

Since the port of Arica was necessary to establish a secure supply line in the area, on May 28, Baquedano sent the "Buin" 1st Line, 3rd Line and 4th Line regiments, along with the Lautaro and Bulnes battalions by train to Arica, totalizing 5,379 soldiers. With the Allied defeat at Tacna, Arica was completely isolated from the rest of the Peruvian territory; with no chance of being reinforced or resupplied, leaving the Peruvian garrison at the port with no other option but to wait for the Chileans. Hence, the encirclement of Arica was completed by June 5 without major troubles. Two divisions were posted at Arica with 1,901 men, under the command of Colonel Francisco Bolognesi, garrisoned in two forts and a set of cannon batteries. On the 6, the Chileans shelled the Peruvian positions by land and sea. After Bolognesi refused to surrender, on June 7, the 3rd Line and 4th Line regiments assailed the East and North forts, taking the defences with a melee in 55 minutes, vanquishing almost all of its defenders.

== Consequences ==
The victory of Chile in this campaign meant the dissolution of the Alliance between Peru and Bolivia, since the latter country never fought in the war again. Also, Bolivia became a landlocked country, situation which maintains today. On his hand, Peru lost the Tarapacá department and the port of Arica definitively. Besides, Peru lost control over Tacna for almost fifty years, until Chile returned it in 1929.

== See also ==
- Treaty of Lima (1929), on the boundary dispute

== Bibliography ==
- Mellafe, Rafael; Pelayo, Mauricio (2004). La Guerra del Pacífico en imágenes, relatos, testimonios. Centro de Estudios Bicentenario.
