= Battle of Los Ángeles =

Military action fought in Peru

- Part of the War of the Pacific
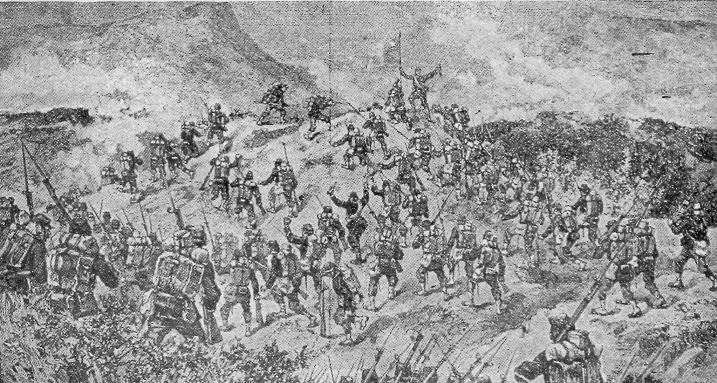
- Battle of Los Ángeles
Date	22 March 1880
Location	Moquegua, Peru
Result	Chilean victory

Belligerents
Chile	Peru

Commanders and leaders
(Chile) Manuel Baquedano	(Peru) Andrés Gamarra

Units involved
(Chile) Chilean Army: 2nd Line Regiment; Santiago Regiment; Atacama Battalion; Bulnes Battalion; Granaderos Cavalry Regiment; Cazadores Cavalry Regiment; 2 artillery batteries	(Peru) Peruvian Army: Grau Infantry Battalion; Cazadores de Cuzco Infantry Battalion; Canas Infantry Battalion; Canchis Infantry Battalion; Gendarmes of Moquegua

Strength
4,066 infantry 300 cavalry	1,400 men

Casualties and losses
9 killed 41 wounded Total: 50 casualties	30 killed 70 wounded 45 captured

The Battle of Los Ángeles was a military action fought on 22 March 1880 between the Chilean and Peruvian armies during the Tacna and Arica Campaign of the War of the Pacific. The Chilean forces under Commander in chief Manuel Baquedano assaulted and defeated the Allied stronghold guided by Andrés Gamarra garrisoned at Los Angeles hill top.

== Preliminary moves ==
After a successful scouting mission to discover the allied strength in the area, a massive landing took place at Ilo between 18 and 25 February, disembarking 9,500 men on the Peruvian shore.

=== Expedition to Mollendo ===
The Chilean command decided to launch a second operation against Mollendo, so on 8 March were shipped the 3rd Line Regiment, the Navales and Zapadores battalions, 10 engineers and 30 riders, all under Col. Orozimbo Barboza. The goal was to fix the Peruvian 1st Division keeping it from aiding the second one which were to be attacked by Baquedano's main force and destroy the docking facilities of Mollendo to obviate future blockading of the port.

Along with Barboza, the engineer Federico Stuven was sent to repair the rail road broke by Zapata on February. Performing this task a fierce skirmish was held by soldiers of the "Buin" 1st Line Regiment and the Peruvian Gendarmes. Meanwhile, a Navales Regiment detachment was unshipped at Islay and took Mollendo on 9 March without any resistance. The Peruvians reacted quickly concentrating troops in order to counterattack. Barboza took Mejia on 10 March, disabling the rail road and several freight wagons. When he returned to Mollendo saw that great part of his army was looting and burning the port committing abuses against the population. Barbosa re-embarked his troops and left Mollendo on the 13. This event caused considerable embarrassment to the administration in Santiago and to the army; according to private letters of Lieutenant Rafael Torreblanca, some soldiers were condemned to capital punishment.

=== Expedition to Moquegua ===
In the meantime, on 12 March under the command of, General Cavalry Commander Gen. Manuel Baquedano, the 2nd Division was ordered to march over Mollendo. This force was formed by the "Buin" 1st Line and Santiago regiments, the Atacama and Bulnes battalions, two artillery batteries and the Cazadores a Caballo and Granaderos a Caballo cavalry regiments.

At 03:00 hrs, Baquedano marched with 800 riders and a company of the 1st Line Regiment, only to rest the next day at the Ilo river valley, abundant in food and water. Here was to wait for the rest of the division, which started to move on 15 March. The operations line extended alongside the rail road from Ilo to Moquegua The region was extremely arid, so in order to supply the men with water, a train was set with a water wagon. Baquedano reached Hospicio, were in a lack of calculation, the entire water supply were consumed. When the rest of the division reached Hospicio and found no water, a discipline issue arose but it was quickly resolved with another water cargo sent by train. Meanwhile, Baquedano continued his march to Conde, reaching Moquegua on 20 March.

Meanwhile, acknowledging he was outnumbered, Col. Andrés Gamarra with the 1st Division of Montero's Southern Army withdrew to the defensive position at Los Angeles hill. Following him, Baquedano marched over Los Angeles on 20 March.

== Chilean Army ==
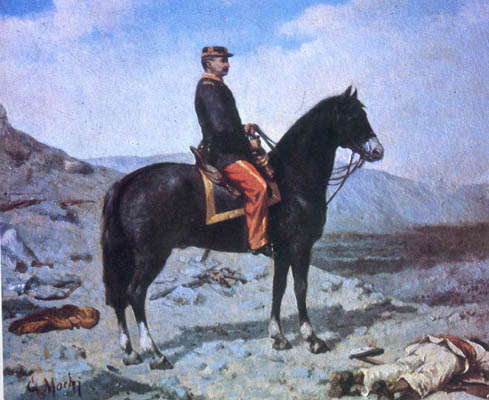
General Manuel Baquedano

The Chilean task force led by Manuel Baquedano was formed by the 2nd Line and Santiago regiments, the Atacama and Bulnes battalions, two artillery batteries and 300 riders from the Granaderos and Cazadores cavalry regiments; in total about 4,500 men.

=== Chilean strategy ===
Baquedano made several scout missions to the Peruvian positions, thinking a bold plan to take them. Colonel Muñoz with twelve companies of the 2nd Line and Santiago regiments, an artillery battery and 300 riders was commissioned to attack the Peruvian left flank sited at El Pulpito. On the night of 21 March, Juan Martinez' Atacama Battalion would outflank the Peruvian positions marching along the Torata river's creek and later to climb the Guaneros slope covered by the darkness. Baquedano with three companies of the Santiago and the Bulnes Battalion and two batteries were to frontally charge the Peruvians.

== Peruvian Army ==
Col. Gamarra had the Grau, Cazadores de Cuzco, Canas and Canchis infantry battalions, under the command of Col. Julio Chocano, Col. Manuel Gamarra, Col. Martin Alvarez and Col. Manuel Velasco, plus a column of Gendarmes of Moquegua led by Col. Manuel Jimenez, gathering up around 1,400 soldiers.

=== Peruvian strategy ===
Gamarra's plan was to use the terrain to his advantage, and to wait the Chilean assault on Los Angeles hill summit, considered by that time as unbeatable, due to its location over a hill that could only be assaulted on the front of the same name slope, and has to be taken with an assail in ascension and under fire, enhancing the attacking difficulties. The only weak spot was the Tumilaca river creek, but it was very easy to defend from El Pulpito. On the Pampa del Arrastrado, on the upper Los Angeles plateau, must be attacked by climbing huge and very even rocks forming a vertical stone wall.

The Grau Battalion were stationed on Los Angeles summit in front of Tarmolambo, covering the road to Alto de la Villa, and the Granaderos de Cuzco Battalion was set on the Quilin Quilin heights with two companies forwarded to El Pulpito. The right flank was not defended with any unit since it was believed it was impossible to climb. On the rear, on the Pampa del Arrastrado were placed the Canchis and Canas battalions, as a reserve. These two were to relieve the other two units every 24 hours.

== The battle ==
Battle of Los Angeles according to Diego Barros Arana's "Historia de la Guerra del Pacifico"

On the night of 21 March, 20 soldiers of the Grau Battalion led by Col. Chocano attacked the positions of the Cazadores a Caballo Regiment, killing three soldiers and capturing four horses. On their retreat, Chocano's men were engaged by the Atacama Battalion rearguard. Despite being discovered, Baquedano ordered Martinez to proceed as planned. In the meantime, Muñoz' column marched in a narrow path formed by the Tumilaca river's creek, with a company of the 2nd Line Regiment and a Santiago battalion on the vanguard. Baquedano's force forwarded whilst the Chilean wings were deploying, assuming positions in the front line.

By 04:00 hrs of 22 March, the battle started when Muñoz' troops were sighted by the soldiers at El Pulpito, being engaged by a company of the Granaderos de Cuzco Battalion immediately, reinforced later by another one of the Canchis Battalion. These two companies successfully detained Muñoz's advance since his men were trapped in the narrow corridor and shot from the heights. Also, the troops at Tambolambo were contained by the Peruvian fire.

Gamarra sent the Granaderos de Cuzco and Canas battalions to reinforce the position on his left flank, but the Atacama Battalion reached the summit, assailing the astonished Peruvian soldiers and routing their lines with a bayonet charge.

=== Ending ===
With the terrain advantage lost, the rest of Gamarra's soldiers began to refold. On Quilin Quilin, the 2nd Line Regiment successfully extracted one company out of the gorge, and set one cannon on the heights in front of the Peruvians. With this support, the Chileans made out of the entrapment and threw the defenders out of their positions. The rest of the Allied forces realized the magnitude of the defeat and joined the bulk of the army marching to Torata. On the site, the notice of the Chilean persecution reached them, and a company of the Granaderos de Cuzco was left to cover the retreat, until the rest of the army reached Chuculay, meanwhile Laiseca's men retreated to Carumas.

== Aftermath ==
The Chilean Army lost 50 men, while the Peruvians lost around 145 men. The victory raised Chilean morale, since the position was considered unbeatable. For this action, the Atacama Battalion won a commendation and Baquedano was promoted to Commander in Chief of the Chilean Operations Army, replacing Erasmo Escala after the latter resigned.
