= Ilabaya District =

Coordinates: 17.4207°S 70.5127°W

Ilabaya
- District
- Location of Ilabaya in the Jorge Basadre Province
- Country: Peru
- Region: Tacna
- Province: Jorge Basadre
- Capital: Ilabaya

Government
  - Mayor: Manuel Raúl Oviedo Palacios

Area
  - Total: 1,111.39 km^{2} (429.11 sq mi)
- Elevation: 1,425 m (4,675 ft)

Population (2005 census)
  - Total: 5,359
  - Density: 4.822/km^{2} (12.49/sq mi)
- Time zone: UTC-5 (PET)
- UBIGEO: 230302

Ilabaya District is one of three districts of the province Jorge Basadre in Peru.

== Climate ==
Climate data for Ilabaya, elevation 1,425 m (4,675 ft), (1991–2020)
Month	Jan	Feb	Mar	Apr	May	Jun	Jul	Aug	Sep	Oct	Nov	Dec	Year
Mean daily maximum °C (°F)	28.6 (83.5)	28.5 (83.3)	28.2 (82.8)	27.3 (81.1)	25.9 (78.6)	24.9 (76.8)	24.8 (76.6)	25.8 (78.4)	26.4 (79.5)	27.1 (80.8)	27.7 (81.9)	28.1 (82.6)	26.9 (80.5)
Mean daily minimum °C (°F)	14.1 (57.4)	14.0 (57.2)	12.8 (55.0)	11.6 (52.9)	10.3 (50.5)	9.0 (48.2)	9.1 (48.4)	10.1 (50.2)	11.0 (51.8)	11.8 (53.2)	12.5 (54.5)	13.8 (56.8)	11.7 (53.0)
Average precipitation mm (inches)	6.6 (0.26)	9.4 (0.37)	3.1 (0.12)	0.0 (0.0)	0.1 (0.00)	0.1 (0.00)	0.1 (0.00)	0.0 (0.0)	0.0 (0.0)	0.0 (0.0)	0.0 (0.0)	2.0 (0.08)	21.4 (0.83)
Source: National Meteorology and Hydrology Service of Peru
