= List of decommissioned ships of the Chilean Navy =

The list of decommissioned ships of the Chilean Navy is mostly compiled from information given in the website of the Chilean Navy. It consists of over 500 historical units including ships of the Patria Vieja, prizes, fireships, armed merchant ships, auxiliary ships, capital ships and, of course, regular warships of the navy ranging from the 25,000 long tons (25,000 t) capital ship Chilean battleship Almirante Latorre to small torpedo boats and early wooden vessels.

At the beginning, the Chilean Navy was almost entirely composed of merchant ships enlisted into naval service in time of war, hence the distinction between warships and merchant ships is often blurred and ships changed their status quickly and subtly.

See also:

- Ships under Chilean Letter of marque (in this article)
- List of undelivered ships (in this article)
- List of active ships of the Chilean Navy

== Key ==
- Shipname - is a shortened form of the official name but includes the launch year (or commissioning year). Rank and titles of persons are not shown.
- HCS - Hull classification symbol
- type - is an English translation of the type given in Navy website
- t - includes different measures for the size of the ships: Displacement, BRT, BM, Long ton, etc.
- Unit - Unit of the previous number
- other names - outside the service time in the navy. If the ship was renamed during her service in the navy, then Ren. is set and respectively an Ex- prefix is given in the grey row with the new name.
- Init - the year of the first service for the navy
- Builder - shipyard for new ships, the name of the navy that sold the (old) ship or "prize" if the ship was captured
- End - last year of service in the navy
- Fate- the last information about the ship.
- Reference

== List of ships operated by the Chilean Navy ==
List of decommissioned ships of the Chilean Navy
Shipname	HCS	Type	t	Unit	Other names	Init	Builder	End	Fate	Reference
Potrillo (1812)		Brigantine			Colt	1813		1813	"Old Fatherland" ship	
Perla (1811)		Frigate			Pearl	1813			Old Fatherland ship	
Águila (1796)		Brigantine	220		Eagle, ren. Pueyrredón	1817	Spanish prize	1828		
Pueyrredón (1796)		Brigantine	220		Ex-Águila	1817	Spanish prize	1828		
Araucano (1817)		Brigantine			Carmelo	1817		1817		
Fortunata (1817)		Schooner	50			1817	Built in Constitución, Chile	1823		
María (1817)		Frigate	280			1817		1817		
Rambler (1817)		Brigantine				1817		1817		
Elena (1818)		Sailship				1818	Spanish prize			
Lautaro (1818)		East Indiaman	850		Windham	1800		1828		
Magdalena (1818)		Brigantine	300			1818	Spanish prize	1818		
Araucano (1817)		Brigantine	270		Columbus, Prudence	1818		1821	Lost after mutiny in Loreto, scrapped in Tubuai	
Galvarino (1809)		Cruizer-class brig-sloop	398.0		HMS Hecate (1809), Lucy	1818	Royal Navy	1828		
Chacabuco (1818)		Corvette	450		Coquimbo	1818		1826	Sold to Argentina	
San Martín (1818)		East Indiaman	1,300		Cumberland	1818		1821		
Dolores (1818)		Frigate				1818	Spanish prize			
Elena (1818)		Frigate				1818	Spanish prize			
Lucero (1819)		Brigantine	74.0			1819	Spanish prize	1819		
Bárbara (1819)		Schooner				1819		1819		
Victoria (1819)		Schooner	46.0			1819	Spanish prize	1819	Used as fire ship by Cochrane	
Begoña (1819)		Frigate	400			1819	Built in Ría de Guayaquil	1819	Spanish prize 1819	
Intrépido (1818)		Brigantine	300		Maipú	1819		1820		
Jerezana (1819)		Brigantine				1819	Spanish prize			
Moctezuma (1819)		Sloop	200			1819	Spanish prize	1828		
Veloz (1819)		Brigantine	164.0			1819	Spanish prize			
Águila (1819)		Brigantine	800			1819	Spanish prize	1822		
Independencia (1818)		Corvette	380		Curiosity	1819		1826	Sold to Argentina	
Teresana (1819)		Schooner				1819	Spanish prize	1819	Used as fire ship by Cochrane	
O'Higgins (1816)		Frigate	1,220		Patrikii, Reina María Isabel, ren. María Isabel	1819	Spanish prize	1826		
María Isabel (1819)		Frigate	1,220		Ex-O'Higgins	1819	Spanish prize	1826		
Esmeralda (1791)		Frigate	950		Ren. Valdivia (1791)	1820	Spanish prize	1825		
Valdivia (1791)		Frigate	950		Ex-Esmeralda (1791)	1820	Spanish prize	1825		
Hércules (1820)		Brigantine				1820				
Inglés (1820)		Brigantine				1820				
Golondrina (1820)		Schooner				1820				
Hércules (1820)		Frigate				1820				
Mackenna		Frigate				1820	Spanish prize	1820		
Expresa (1820)		Frigate				1820				
Peruana (1820)		Frigate	350			1820		1823		
Regina (1820)		Brigantine				1820	Spanish prize			
Nancy (1820)		Frigate				1820		1820		
Consecuencia (1820)		Frigate				1820				
Gaditana (1820)		Frigate				1820				
Libertad (1820)		Frigate				1820				
Argentina (1820)		Frigate				1820				
Carmen (1823)		Frigate				1821	Spanish prize	1823		
Trujillana (1821)		Frigate				1821		1823		
Claro (1821)		Brigantine				1821	Spanish prize			
Dos Amigos (1821)		Brigantine				1821				
Resolución (1821)		Frigate				1821	Built in Ría de Guayaquil			
Aranzazú (1821)		Schooner	120			1821	Spanish prize	1822	Mutiny and beached 1822 in Río Guayas, Ecuador	
Monteagudo (1751)		Frigate	980		Las Caldas, Ex-Milagro	1821	Spanish prize	1821		
Milagro (1751)		Frigate	980		Ren. Monteagudo (1751)	1821	Spanish prize	1821		
Jesús María (1821)		Schooner				1821	Spanish prize	1821		
San Agustín (1821)		Brigantine				1821	Spanish prize			
Monarca (1821)		Brigantine				1821	Spanish prize	1821		
Ave María (1821)		Schooner				1821	Spanish prize	1821		
Congreso (1821)		Schooner				1821	Spanish prize			
San Fernando (1821)						1821	Spanish Prize			
Mercedes (1821)		Schooner	110			1821	Spanish prize	1821		
Rising Star (1818)		Steamer	350			1822	Built in England		Sunk 1830 in Irish Sea	
Neptuno (1822)		Brigantine				1822		1822		
Pacífico (1823)		Brigantine				1823		1823		
Ceres (1823)		Merchant ship hired as a transport for the 1824 expedition to Peru				1823				
Voltaire (1823)		Corvette	350			1823	Sangrones Letaillada y Cía	1824		
Santa Rosa (1823)		Merchant ship hired as a transport for the 1824 expedition to Peru				1823		1823		
Sesostris (1823)		British merchant ship hired as a transport for the 1824 expedition to Peru				1823		1823		
Oxly (1823)		Schooner			Oxley or Fermín Oxley or Hóscley	1823	Built in Chiloé			
Esther (1823)		Of Liverpool, Davis, master. British merchant ship hired as a transport for the 1824 expedition to Peru				1823				
Aquiles (1824)		Brigantine	405.0			1824		1839		
Infatigable (1824)		Brigantine				1824				
Tucapel (1824)		Brigantine				1824		1824		
Valparaíso (1824)		Brigantine				1824				
Constituyente (1829)		Brigantine				1829				
Olifante (1829)		Brigantine				1829		1830		
Juana Pastora (1824)		Sloop				1829		1830		
Diligente (1830)		Schooner				1830				
Dos Hermanas (1830)		Brigantine				1830		1830		
Railif (1830)		Brigantine				1830		1830		
Colo Colo (1830)		Brigantine	140		Flora	1830		1841		
Aycinema (1830)		Brigantine				1830		1830		
Orbegoso (1835)		Brigantine	200		Ren. Condor	1835		1840		
Cóndor (1835)		Brigantine	200		Ex-Orbegoso	1835		1840		
Salvador (1835)		Brigantine	183.0			1835		1838		
Isabella (1835)		Boat	269.0			1835				
Libertad (1828)		Corvette	632.0		General Salom	1836	Built in USA	1840		
Valparaíso (1831)		Corvette	650		Adrianne, Lewis	1836		1840		
Peruviana (1828)		Schooner				1836	Peruvian prize	1838	Re-captured 1838	
Carmen (1836)		Ship				1836		1837		
Arequipeño (1828)		Brigantine	400		Rápido	1836		1839		
Eleodoro (1837)		Brigantine				1837				
Zaldívar (1837)		Boat				1837		1834		
Paguina (1837)		Boat				1837		1839		
Huemul (1837)		Brigantine	170			1837				
Colcura (1837)		Boat				1837		1883		
Hércules (1837)		Brigantine				1837				
Esperanza (1837)		Boat	191.0			1837		1838		
Teodoro (1837)		Brigantine				1837				
Dos Hermanos (1818)		Brigantine	172.0		Resignación	1837	Built in England	1839		
Pacífico (1835)		Boat	217.0			1837		1838		
Joven Victoria (1837)		Brigantine				1837				
Margarita (1837)		Frigate	258.0			1837		1837		
San Antonio (1835)		Brigantine	157.0			1837		1837		
Napoleón (1836)		Brigantine	135.0			1837		1838		
Neptuno (1838)		Brigantine				1838		1838		
Cecilia (1838)		Brigantine				1838				
Ovalle (1835)		Brigantine	138.0			1838		1838		
Teresa (1835)		Schooner	148.0		Urna	1838	Built in Boston, USA			
Joven Daniel (1831)		Brigantine	180		Soverence	1838	Built in Linn	1849	Wrecked off the coast of Araucanía, then looted by Mapuches	
Janequeo (1836)		Brigantine	450		Isaac Macen	1838		1858	Sunk War of the Pacific	*
Confederación (1836)		Corvette	600		Casimiro Perier, Francisca	1838	Peru-Bolivian prize	1840		
Señorense (1838)		Brigantine				1838				
Azardoso (1838)		Brigantine				1838				
Orión (1835)		Brigantine				1838		1838		
Bathaienay (1838)		Brigantine				1838				
Gipsy (1838)		Brigantine				1838		1838		
Socabaya (1836)		Corvette	725.0		Francisca	1838		1840		
Hope (1838)		Brigantine				1838				
Santa Cruz (1836)		Barque	650		Isabel	1839	Confederation prize	1840		
Chile (1840)		Frigate	1,109.0			1840	M. Courrant, Bordeaux	1851		
Ancud (1843)		Schooner	27.0			1843	in Ancud	1849		
Quech Magallanes (1844)		Schooner	200			1844		1848		
Maule (1847)		Paddle steamer	60			1847	Built in Valparaíso	1855		
Elvira Alvarez (1847)		Boat	943.0		Ren. Simpson in 1887	1847		1889		
Simpson (1847)		Boat	943.0		Ex-Elvira Alvarez (1847)	1847		1889		
Dos Hermanos Gameros (1848)		Sloop				1848				
Confederación (1827)		Boat	331.0			1848				
Edmond (1850)		Boat				1850		1890		
Meteoro (1848)		Brigantine	290			1850	Built in New Orleans for Mexico	1861		*
Argomedo (1850)		Sailship				1850		1890		
Excelsior (1850)		Sailship				1850		1890		
Dordrech (1850)		Sailship	835.0			1850		1890		
Infatigable (1850)		Boat				1851		1855		
Cazador (1848)		Steamer	250			1851		1856	Sunk off Punta Carranza, largest death toll (460) in Chilean history	
Constitución (1851)		Corvette	644.0			1851	Duprat Shipyard	1857		
Ancud (1853)		Brigantine	493.0			1853	Duprat Shipyard	1859		
Esmeralda (1855)		Corvette	854.0			1855	William Pitcher, Northfleet	1879	Sunk War of the Pacific	
Maule (1856)		Steamer	80			1856		1871		
María Isabel (1857)		Steamer	800			1857		1857		
Maipú (1855)		Steamer	450			1858	Built in England	1867		
Pizarro (1858)		Brigantine				1858		1859		
Guayacón (1859)		Steamer				1859		1865		
Independencia (1857)		Schooner	800			1859		1876		
Antonio Varas (1856)		Steamer	484.0			1859		1867		
Paquete del Maule (1861)		Small merchant sidewheel steamer	407.0			1861	Lawrence & Foulks	1866		
Ñuble (1861)		Steamer	507.0		Poncas, Scioto	1864		1868		
Arturo		Steamer	39.0			1865		1867		
Covadonga (1859)		Schooner	630			1865	Spanish prize	1880	Sunk War of the Pacific	*
Lautaro (1852)		Steamer	480		Lambayeque, General Lerzundi	1865		1866		
Abtao (1866)		Corvette	1,600		Texas, Cyclone	1866	Dennis Brothers	1922		*
Concepción (1861)		Steamer	642.0		Giraffe, General R.E.Lee, Fort Donnelson, Isabella	1866	River Clyde in Scotland	1868		
Thalaba (1865)		Frigate	940			1866		1910		
Valdivia (1865)		Steamer	900		Henriette	1866				
Arauco (1869)		Steamer	1,400		Neshannoc	1866		1871		
Chacabuco (1866)		Corvette	1,101.0			1868	Miller, Ravenhill and Co., London	1890		
O'Higgins (1866)		Corvette	1,101.0			1868		1895		*
Ancud (1859)		Screw steam gunboat	606.0		USS Cherokee (1864), Thistle	1868	US Navy	1878		
Fósforo (1852)		Steamer	80			1868	Laird Brothers	1870		
Independencia (1870)		Tug	50			1870				
Toltén (1872)		Steamer	317.0			1873	F. y G. Rennie, France	1894		
Rímac (1872)		Steamer	1,800			1874	R. & J. Evans & Co	1902	Property of the CSAV. (Note: Under a government regulation of May 5, 1874 that allowed a subsidy in times of peace, the CVSA's ships were turned over to the government during the War of the Pacific (1879–1882). Carlos López Urrutia, The Sea and Chilean Expansion)	
Cochrane (1874)		Ironclad	3,540			1874	Earle's Shipbuilding	1933		
Magallanes (1873)		Corvette	950			1874	Ravenhill or France	1906		*
Vapor Veloz (1875)		Boat	37.0			1875		1877		
Blanco Encalada (1875)		Ironclad	3,540		Ex-Valparaíso (1875)	1875	Earle's Shipbuilding	1891	Sunk during 1891 Chilean Civil War	
Valparaíso (1875)		Ironclad	3,540		Ren. Blanco Encalada (1875)	1875	Earle's Shipbuilding	1891		
Rimaquito (1875)		Steamer	30			1875		1885		
Loa (1873)		Steamer	1,657.0			1879	John Reid & Co., Glasgow	1880	Sunk War of the Pacific	
Lota (1866)		Frigate	1,367.0			1879		1883		
Huanay (1864)		Steamer	336.0			1879	Palmer Bros and Co.	1880		
Barnard Castle (1878)		Steamer	1,673.0			1879	J. Laing, Sunderland shipbuilding	1883	Sunk 1886 in Pilot Bay on Bentinck Island, east of Pedder Bay Marina	
Cousiño (1870)		Steamer	649.0			1879	Gourlay Brothers	1883		
Pilcomayo (1864)		Corvette	600			1879	Peruvian prize	1909		
Laurita (1850)		Barge				1879		1883		
Kate Kellok (1864)		Boat	1,175.0		ren. Yungay	1879	Built in Sunderland	1886		
Juana (1850)		Sailship	550			1879				
Janequeo (1879)		Torpedo boat	30			1879	Yarrow Shipbuilders	1880		
Itata (1873)		Steamer	1,776.0			1879	R&J. Evans & Co., Liverpool	1891	Property of CSAV	
Guacolda (1879)		Torpedo boat			Alay	1879	Peruvian prize	1881		
Vedette (1879)		Torpedo boat	10			1879	Yarrow Shipbuilders			
Herminia (1850)		Boat	153.0			1879		1884		
Inspector (1860)		Frigate	1,415.0			1879	Built in Belfast	1884	Property of CSAV	
Avestruz (1840)		Ship	798.0		Victoria	1879		1884		
Paquete del Maule (1866)		Small merchant sidewheel steamer	313.0			1879	Built in Preston, U. K.	1880	Property of CSAV	
Julia (1850)		Steamer	1,000			1879				
Amazonas (1874)		Transporter/Cruiser	2,019.0			1879	John Reid & Co., Glasgow	1902		
Toro (1874)		Steamer	150			1879		1910		
Huáscar (1865)		Ironclad	1,199.0			1879	Peruvian prize		Museum ship	
Limarí (1869)		Steamer	967.0		Maipú	1879	Bowdler, Chaffer & Co., Liverpool	1880	Property of CSAV	
Teno (1879)		Steamer				1879		1879		
Isidora de Cousiño (1873)		Steamer	635.0		Santa Rosa	1879	Backhouse and Dixon, Middlesbrough			
Santa Lucía (1879)		Steamer	350			1879		1880		
Copiapó (1870)		Steamer				1879		1891		
Angamos (1876)		Transporter/Cruiser	1,180		Belle City of Cork	1879	James E. Scott, Greenock	1890		
Murzi Giuseppe (1879)		Sailship				1879		1880		
Lamar (1870)		Transporter	1,400		Lota	1879	Gourlay Brothers	1880		
Matías Cousiño (1859)		Steamer			Valparaíso, Orompello, Quintero	1879	Hamtlepool, England	1884	Sunk after collision with América	
Carlos Roberto (1872)		Steamer	464.0		Don Mariano	1879	Blackhouse, Dixon	1883	Property of Compañía Explotadora de Lota y Coronel	
Orcero (1850)		Sailship	400			1880		1880		
Chile (1863)		Steamer	1,672.0			1880	Randolph and Elder, Glasgow	1885	Coaling station	
Colo Colo (1880)		Colo Colo-class torpedo boat	5.0 or 30			1880	Yarrow Shipbuilders	1885 or 1915	Transported to the Titicaca Lake during the War of the Pacific	
Tucapel (1880)		Colo Colo-class torpedo boat	5.0 or 30			1880	Yarrow Shipbuilders	1891 or 1915		
Valparaíso (1870)		Boat	14.0			1880		1880		
Isluga (1850)		Steamer				1880	Peruvian prize	1883		
Fresia (1880)		Torpedo boat	25.0			1880	Yarrow Shipbuilders	1884	Sunk War of the Pacific, refloated 1880 and scrapped 1884.	
Wilhelm (1880)		Sailship				1880		1880		
Norfolk (1856)		Sailship				1880		1880		
Payta (1864)		Steamer	1,344.0			1880	Randolph and Elder, Glasgow	1881		
Princesa Luisa (1870)		Transporter	120		Since 1880 ren. Lautaro, ren. Micalvi	1880		1910		
Lautaro (1870)		Transporter	120		Ex-Princesa Luisa (1870)	1880		1910		
Micalvi (1870)		Transporter	120		Ex-Lautaro (1870)	1880		1910		
Otto (1863)		Sailship	500			1880		1880		
Umberto I (1875)		Frigate	1,098.0		Rota, Julia	1880		1880		
21 de Mayo (1880)		Steamer	400			1880				
Gaviota (1875)		Steamer	30			1880		1895		
Janequeo (1881)		Torpedo boat	35.0			1881	Yarrow Shipbuilders	1891		
Lauca (1881)		Torpedo boat	35.0			1881	Yarrow Shipbuilders	1891		
Rucumilla (1881)		Torpedo boat	25.0			1881	Yarrow Shipbuilders	1902		
Miraflores (1881)		Boat	1,800			1881	Peruvian prize	1903		
Pisagua (1868)		Steamer	1,600			1881	Schlesinger Davis and Co., Newcastle	1882		
Quidora (1881)		Torpedo boat	25.0			1881	Yarrow Shipbuilders	1902		
Pachitea (1881)		Boat	200			1881	Peruvian prize	1881		
Tegualda (1881)		Torpedo boat	35.0			1881	Yarrow Shipbuilders	1891		
Guale (1881)		Torpedo boat	35.0			1881	Yarrow Shipbuilders	1899		
Glaura (1881)		Torpedo boat	35.0			1881	Yarrow Shipbuilders	1885	Sold to Japan	
Fresia (1882)		Torpedo boat	25.0			1882	Yarrow Shipbuilders	1884		
Guacolda (1882)		Torpedo boat	35.0			1882	Yarrow Shipbuilders			
Valparaíso (1870)		Cutter	50			1882		1892		
Chipana (1882)		Barge				1882	Assembled in Constitución, Chile	1903		
Calama (1882)		Barge				1882	Assembled in Constitución, Chile	1922		
Constitución (1882)		Dredger	740			1885	Built in Germany	1922		
Aldea (1885)		Torpedo boat	85.0			1885	Yarrow Shipbuilders	1920		
Huemul (1889)		Tug	145.0			1889	Forges et Chantiers	1921	Sunk 1899, refloated	
Domingo Santa María (1889)		Frigate				1889				
Esmeralda (1883)		Cruiser, protected	2,977.0		Izumi	1889	Armstrong Whitworth	1893	Sold to Japan	*
Condell (1890)		Almirante Lynch-class torpedo gunboat	702.0		Ren. Talcahuano	1890	Laird Brothers or Electric Boat	1919		
Talcahuano (1890)		Almirante Lynch-class torpedo gunboat	702.0		Ex-Condell (1890)	1890	Laird Brothers	1919		
Lynch (1890)		Almirante Lynch-class torpedo gunboat	702.0		Ren. Tomas	1890	Laird Brothers	1919		
Tomás (1890)		Almirante Lynch-class torpedo gunboat	702.0		Ex-Lynch (1890)	1890	Laird Brothers	1919		
Aquiles (1890)		Tug				1890		1929		
Maule (1885)		Steamer	204.0			1891	John Reid & Co., Glasgow	1891	Property of CSAV	
Cachapoal (1881)		Steamer	2,308.0			1891	Laird Brothers	1891	Property of CSAV	
Longaví (1884)		Steamer	442.0			1891	David Napier (marine engineer)	1891	Property of CSAV	
Trumao (1889)		Steamer	249.0			1891	de:Janssen & Schmilinsky	1891		
Imperial (1888)		Steamer	2,704.0			1891	Laird Brothers	1891	Property of CSAV	
Minero (1850)		Tug				1891		1891		
Angamos (1890)		Transporter	3,597.0		Citta de Venezia, Spartan	1891	Swan Hunter	1928archiv	Sunk 1928 off Lebu, Chile, death toll 262	
Loa (1850)		Barge			Dalwinston	1891		1891	Property of CSAV	
Maipo (1882)		Steamer	2,621.0			1891	John Reid Co., Glasgow	1891	Property of CSAV	
Dithmarschen (1872)		Steamer	776.0		Anita	1891	R.and H.Geen, Londres	1891		
Cóndor (1889)		Tug	145.0			1891	Forges et Chantiers	1937		
Cachapoalito (1850)		Tug				1891				
Pudeto (1884)		Steamer	273.0			1891	J. Knox Co., Sunderland	1891	Property of CSAV	
Laja (1880)		Steamer	2,147.0			1891	John Reid Co	1891	Property of CSAV	
Luis Cousiño (1872)		Steamer	1,890			1891	Laird Brothers	1891		
Mapocho (1883)		Steamer	2,053.0			1891	Laird Brothers	1891	Property of CSAV	
Bío Bío (1888)		Steamer	407.0			1891	R. Napier and Sons, Glasgow	1891		
Pinto (1890)		Cruiser, protected	2,047.0			1891	Forges et Chantiers	1905		
Errázuriz (1891)		Cruiser, protected	2,047.0			1891	Forges et Chantiers	1930		
Bismarck (1850)		Steamer				1891		1891		
Prat (1890) (Note: The "first" Prat was the 1880 launched Japanese gunboat Tsukushi, built for Chile but sold to Japan. She never sailed under Chilean flag.)		Battleship pre-dreadnought	6,901.0			1891	Forges et Chantiers	1942		
Aconcagua (1889)		Steamer	2,769.0			1891	John Reid and Co., Glasgow	1891		
Casma (1889)		Transporter	2,627.0		Aquila, Marañón	1892	Wigham Richardson	1917		
Blanco Encalada (1893)		Cruiser, protected	4,568.0			1893	Armstrong Whitworth	1946		
María Teresa (1850)		Schooner				1894		1894		
Caupolicán (1895)		Tug				1895				
Yañez (1882)		Cutter	126.0		Goole Nº 7	1895	J.T. Eltringham, South Shields	1936		
Simpson (1896)		Torpedo gunboat	800		Ecuador's Libertador Simón Bolivar	1896	Laird Brothers	1907	Sold to Ecuador	
Serrano (1896)		Destroyer	311.0			1896	Laird Brothers (Note: The destroyers Muñoz Gamero (1896), Orella (1896), Riquelme (1896) (ren. Lientur (1896)) and Serrano (1896) were built by Laird Brothers and belonged to the same class)	1924		
Riquelme (1896)		Destroyer	311.0		Ren. Lientur (1896)	1896	Laird Brothers	1930		
Lientur (1896)		Destroyer	311.0		Ex-Riquelme (1896)	1896	Laird Brothers	1930		
Orella (1896)		Destroyer	311.0			1896	Laird Brothers			
Muñoz Gamero (1896)		Destroyer	311.0			1896	Laird Brothers	1924		
Esmeralda (1895)		Cruiser, protected	7,000			1896	Armstrong Whitworth	1933		
Zenteno (1896)		Cruiser, protected	3,450			1896	Armstrong Whitworth	1930		
Mutilla (1896)		Torpedo boat, Viper class	140			1896	Yarrow Shipbuilders (Note: The ships Mutilla, Contreras, Thomson and Rodríguez were built by Yarrow of Poplar (later Yarrow Shipbuilders) and transported in boxes to Valparaíso. Mutilla and Contreras were assembled by Lever, Murphy & Co Shipyard in Viña del Mar in 1898, Thomsom (later Ingeniero Mery) by Arsenal Naval de Talcahuano in 1900 and Rodríguez was assembled in the yard "Las Torpederas" in 1899. Videla and Hyatt were built (and assembled) in Yarrow. See Buques de la Armada construidos en Chile by Germán Bravo Valdivieso)	1922		,
Hyatt (1896)		Torpedo boat, Viper class	140			1896	Yarrow Shipbuilders	1922		
O'Higgins (1897)		Cruiser, armoured	7,796.0			1897	Armstrong Whitworth	1943		
Gálvez (1897)		Cutter	475.0			1897	Flemming and Ferguson Eng., Paisley, Scotland	1966		
Rodriguez (1896)		Torpedo boat, Viper class	140			1898	Yarrow Shipbuilders	1922		
Contreras (1896)		Torpedo boat, Viper class	140			1898	Yarrow Shipbuilders	1922		
Videla (1896)		Torpedo boat, Viper class	140			1898	Yarrow Shipbuilders	1922		
Thomson (1896)		Torpedo boat, Viper class	140		Ren. Ingeniero Mery	1898	Yarrow Shipbuilders	1922		
Ingeniero Mery (1896)		Torpedo boat, Viper class	140		Ex-Thomson (1896)	1898	Yarrow Shipbuilders	1922		
County of Peebles (1875)		Windjammer	1,691.0		Ren. Muñoz Gamero (1875)	1898	Barclay Curle	1960		
Muñoz Gamero (1875)		Windjammer	1,691.0		Ex-County of Peebles	1898	Barclay Curle	1960		
Marinao (1890)		Tug				1898		1925		
Freire (1898)		Tug	94.0			1898		1854		
Baquedano (1898)		Pontoon				1898				
Pisagua (1884)		Tug	510		Juanita	1898	H. Mac Intyre & Co., Paisley	1926		
British Commodore (1850)		Frigate	1,389.0		Knigth Bachelor, ren. Yungay	1898	Palmer & Sons		Purchased as Coaling station	
Yungay (1850)		Frigate	1,389.0		Ex-British Commodore (1850)	1898	Palmer & Sons			
Galvarino (1885)		Tug	330		Quebracho	1899	John Fullerton and Co., Paisley, Glasgow	1928		
Andalucía (1899)		Frigate				1899				
Baquedano (1898)		Corvette	2,500			1899	Armstrong & Co, Elswick	1935		
Orión (1900)		Tug				1900				
Meteoro (1901)		Tug	800			1901	Lever, Murphy & Co Shipyard	1918		
Rancagua (1898)		Transporter	6,210			1901	Swan Hunter	1931		
Chacabuco (1898)		Cruiser, protected	4,160		4 du Julliet	1902	Armstrong Whitworth	1947		
O'Brien (1902)		Destroyer	350			1902	Laird Brothers	1924		
Merino Jarpa (1902)		Destroyer	350			1902	Laird Brothers	1924		
Thomson (1898)		Destroyer	350			1902	Armstrong, Elswick	1924		
Brito (1904)		Tug				1904		1931		
Lautaro (1898)		Frigate	1,974.0		Ex-Majestic	1904	Built in Hull, England	1956	Bought as colaing station then refitted	
Majestic (1875)		Frigate	1,974.0		Ren. Lautaro (1898)	1904	Built in Hull, England	1956		
Pisagua (1904)		Cutter	800			1905	Behrends Shipyard, Valdivia	1917		
Sarita (1903)						1905	Built in Constitución	1905		
Valdivia (1903)		Cutter	800			1905	Behrens Shipyard, Valdivia	1909		
Baker (1907)		Tug				1907				
Yelcho (1906)		Cutter (boat)	430			1908		1945		
Águila (1909)		Cutter	571.0			1909	Grangemouth and Greenock Dockyard Co., Greenock	1937		
Porvenir (1906)		Cutter	350			1909	Built in Christiania, Norway	1930		
Ortiz (1909)		Tug	295.0			1909	Bow, Mac Lachlan & Co.Ltd	1945		
Sibbald (1909)		Tug	60			1909		1914		
Ancud (1910)		Tug	120			1910		1930		
Campbell (1910)		Tug				1910		1927		
Sirena (1910)		Tug				1910		1923		
Lautaro (1910)		Tug				1910				
Artillero (1908)		artillero	140			1911		1953		
Almirante Lynch (1912)		Destroyer, Almirante Lynch class	1,430			1914	J. Samuel White	1945		
Condell (1912)		Destroyer, Almirante Lynch class	1,430			1914	J. Samuel White	1944		
Maipo (1901)		Transporter	4,687.0		Manitoba	1916	J. L. Thompson & Sons Ltd., Sunderland	1926		
Guale (1917)	H-4	Submarine, H class	363.0		HMS H18	1917	Royal Navy	1945		
Tegualda (1917)	H-2	Submarine, H class	363		HMS H16	1917	Royal Navy	1945		
Rucumilla (1917)	H-3	Submarine, H class	363		HMS H17	1917	Royal Navy	1945		
Quidora (1917)	H-5	Submarine, H class	363		HMS H19	1917	Royal Navy	1945		
Guacolda (1917)	H-1	Submarine, H class	363		HMS H13	1917	Royal Navy	1949		
Fresia (1917)	H-6	Submarine H class	363		HMS H20	1917	Royal Navy	1945		
Colo Colo (1917)		Minelayer, Golub class	540		Toqui	1920	Helsinki	1930		
Elicura (1917)		Minelayer, Golub class	540			1920	Helsinki	1950		
Orompello (1917)		Minelayer, Golub class	540			1920	Helsinki	1958		
Leucotón (1917)		Minelayer, Golub class	540			1920	Helsinki	1950		
Latorre (1913)		Battleship, Latorre class	25,000		HMS Canada	1920	Royal Navy	1959		
Sibbald (1916)		Cutter (ship)	1,100		HMS Piloto Stoic	1920	Bow, McLachlan and Company	1963	Embargoed by UK during WW1	
Williams (1914)		Destroyer, Lynch class	1,700		HMS Botha	1920	Royal Navy	1933		
Goñi (1914)		Destroyer, Lynch class	1,700		HMS Broke, ren. Uribe	1920	Royal Navy	1933	Purshased by England 1914	
Uribe (1914)		Destroyer, Lynch class	1,700		Ex-Goñi (1914)	1920	Royal Navy	1933		
Riveros (1914)		Destroyer, Almirante Lynch class	1,700		Ex-Almirante Simpson (1914), HMS Faulknor (1914),	1920	J S White, Cowes.	1933	Purchased by RN, sold to Chile after WWI	
Simpson (1914)		Destroyer, Lynch class	1,700		Ren. Riveros (1914)	1920	Royal Navy	1933		
Monreal (1925)		Tug	45.0		Petrel	1925	Built in France	1983		
Cortez (1926)		Tug	35.0		Taltal	1926	Built in Valdivia	1956		
Caupolicán (1927)		Tug	28.0			1927	Built in Talcahuano	1957		
Valdivia (1927)		Dredger	1,410			1927	Conrad Weft, Netherlands	1957		
Abtao (1889)		Transporter	8,600		Pontia, Ernest Hemseth	1928		1929		
Videla (1928)		Destroyer, Serrano class	1,090			1928	John I. Thornycroft	1960		
Fortuna (1898)		Tug	94.0			1928		1964	Refitted from an old shipwreck	
Orella (1928)		Destroyer, Serrano class	1,090			1928	John I. Thornycroft	1967		
Simpson (1928)		Submarine, O'Brien class	1,540			1928	Vickers	1957		
O'Brien (1928)		Submarine, O'Brien class	1,540			1928	Vickers	1957		
Hyatt (1928)		Destroyer, Serrano class	1,090			1928	John I. Thornycroft	1963		
Micalvi (1925)		Transporter	850		Bragui, Boston Lines	1928	Oderwerke, Stettin	1961	Museum ship in Puerto Williams since 1961	
Riquelme (1928)		Destroyer, Serrano class	1,090			1928	John I. Thornycroft	1963		
Valdivia (1927)		Transporter	3,100		Scherbek	1928	Henry Koch	1931		
Reyes (1925)		Tug	45.0			1928	Built in Valdivia	1960		
Serrano (1928)		Destroyer	1450			1929	John I. Thornycroft & Company	1962		
Aldea (1925)		Tug	68.0		Ren. Ugarte (1925)	1929		1969		
Ugarte (1925)		Tug	68.0		Ex-Aldea (1925)	1929		1969		
Thomson (1928)		Submarine, O'Brien class	1,540			1929	Vickers	1958		
Janequeo (1929)	ATA-70	Tug	760			1929	Bow, McLachlan and Company	1957		
Sobenes (1929)	ATA-72	Cutter	760			1929	Bow, McLachlan and Company	1966		
Aldea (1928)		Destroyer, Serrano class	1,090			1929	John I. Thornycroft	1957		
Intrépido (1930)		Tug	33.0			1930	Built in Hull, England	1962		
Maipo (1830)		Oil tanker	7,564.0			1930	Vickers Armstrong	1964		
Araucano (1929)		Submarine-tender	9,000			1930	Vickers Armstrong	1959		
Rancagua (1929)		Oil tanker				1930	Vickers Armstrong Ltd.	1964		
Moctezuma (1930)		Tug	33.0			1931	Built in Hull, Newcastle	1966		
Colo Colo (1931)	ATA-73	Tug	760			1931	Bow, McLachlan and Company	1987	Museum ship in Punta Arenas	
Cabrales (1929)	ATA-71	Tug	760			1931	Bow, McLachlan and Company	1965		
Galvarino (1929)	ATA-74	Tug	760			1931	Bow, McLachlan and Company	1966		
Huemul (1935)		Tug	350		Vilumilla	1935	Alberto Daiber Shipyard	1968		
Pelentaro (1935)		Tug	320		Ren. Brito (1935)	1935	Alberto Daiber Shipyard	1952		
Brito (1935)		Tug	320		Ex-Pelentaro (1935)	1935	Alberto Daiber Shipyard	1952	Sunk on 22 October 1952 off Quintero	
Abtao (1912)		Transporter	1,181.0		Sosua (aka La Palmatoria)	1937	Surlanandets Skibsbyggerei, Fevig, Norway	1950		
Vidal Gormaz (1913)		Yacht	670		Jason, Cynara	1940	Day, Summers and Company	1953		
Yagán (1940)		Cutter	21.0			1940		1959		
Lautaro (1917)		four-masted barque			Priwall	1941		1945	Caught fire and sunk 1945	
Magallanes (1911)		Transporter	6,650		Winfried, Siam City and Gundulic	1943		1957	Freed and refitted	
Pilcomayo (1931)		Dredger	3,500			1945		1960		
Angamos (1941)		Transporter	3,800			1946	Aalborg Shipyard	1967		
Iquique (1943)		Frigate, River class	2,216.0		HMCS Joliette	1946	Royal Canadian Navy	1965		
Esmeralda (1944)		Frigate, River class	2,216.0		HMCS Glace Bay (K414), Lauzon ren. Baquedano (1944)	1946	Royal Canadian Navy	1960		
Baquedano (1944)		Frigate, River class	1,445.0		Ex-Esmeralda (1944)	1946	Royal Canadian Navy	1960		
Covadonga (1944)		Frigate	2,216.0		HMCS Sea Cliff (K344), Megantio	1946	Royal Canadian Navy	1967		
Pinto (1945)		Transporter, Artemis class	6,744.0		USS Zenobia AKA-52	1946	US Navy	1968		
Papudo (1944)		Corvette, Flower class	1,340		HMCS Thorlock	1946	Royal Canadian Navy	1965		
Casma (1944)		Corvette, Flower class	1,340		HMCS Stellarton	1946	Royal Canadian Navy	1967	See List	
Chipana (1944)		Corvette, Flower class	1,340		HMCS Strathroy	1946	Royal Canadian Navy	1966		
Errázuriz (1945)		Transporter, Artemis class	4,100		USS Xenia (AKA-51)	1946	US Navy	1962		
Bustos (1943)		Landing ship	385.0		USS LCIL 878, Lancha Polvorera	1947		1967		
Isaza (1944)		Landing ship	1,095.0		USS LSM-295	1947	US Navy	1964		
Goycolea (1944)		Landing ship	1,095.0		USS LSM-400	1947	US Navy	1966		
Morel (1944)		Landing ship	1,095.0		USS LSM-417	1947	US Navy	1958		
Contreras (1944)		Landing ship	1,095.0		USS LSM-113	1947	US Navy	1970		
Díaz (1943)		Landing ship	385.0		USS LCIL-877	1947	US Navy	1958		
Bolados (1943)		Landing ship			USS LCIL-1073	1947		1958		
Eduardo Llanos (1943)		Landing ship	385.0		USS LCIL-1025	1947	US Navy	1965		
Canave (1943)		Landing ship	385.0		USS LCIL-1027	1947		1958		
Tellez (1944)		Landing ship	385.0			1947	US Navy	1958		
Lautaro (1942)	PP-62	Tug, Maricopa class	807.0		USS ATA-122	1948	US Navy	1991		
Lientur (1944)	PP-60	Tug, Maricopa class	830		USS ATA-177	1948	US Navy	1991		
Leucotón (1944)	PP-61	Tug, Maricopa class	830		USS ATA-200	1948	US Navy	1965		
Prat (1937)	CL-03	Cruiser, Brooklyn class	13,000		USS Nashville (CL-43). Ren. Chacabuco	1951	US Navy	1985		
Chacabuco (1937)		Cruiser, Brooklyn class	13,000		USS Nashville (CL-43), Ex-Prat (1937)	1951	US Navy	1985		
O'Higgins (1936)	CL-02	Cruiser, Brooklyn class	9,700		USS Brooklyn (CL-40)	1951	US Navy	1992		
Betelgeuse (1953)		Boat	7.4			1953		1998		
Beagle (1954)		Cutter	40		Juanito	1954		1965		
Brito (1932)		Tug	38.7		Fueguino	1956		1965		
Montt (1956)		Oil tanker	17,500			1956	Ateliers et Chantiers de la Seine Maritime	1978		
Ortiz (1957)		Patrol boat	31.0			1958	Las Habas Shipyard	1969		
Díaz, Antonio (1959)		Tug .				1959				
Guayacán (1959)		Tug	20		Sea Mule	1959		1964		
Piloto Pardo (1958)		Transporter	2,930			1959	Haarlemsche Scheepsbouw Maatschappij, Haarlem, Netherlands	1997		
Bolados (1943)		Landing ship	180		USS LCU-1396	1960		1970		
Williams (1958)	DDG-19	Destroyer, Almirante class	3,300			1960	Vickers-Armstrongs	1998		
Tellez (1943)		Landing ship	180			1960	US Navy	1986		
Pisagua (1943)		Landing ship	28.0			1960	US Navy	1971		
Yelcho (1943)	AGS-64	Tug, Navajo class	1,640		USS Tekesta (AT-93)	1960	US Navy	1996		
Díaz (1943)		Landing ship	180		USS LCU 1458	1960	US Navy	1977		
Junín (1943)		Landing ship	28.0		USS LCM C-124646	1960	US Navy	1965		
Morel (1945)		Landing ship	1,095.0		USS LSM 444 Aloto	1960	US Navy	1982		
Valdivia (1943)		Landing ship			USS LCM C-124958	1960	US Navy			
Yagán (1953)		Tug	131.0			1961		1965		
Isleña (1938)		Boat	20			1961	Oettinger Shipyard, Valdivia	1963		
Caupolicán (1953)		Tug	131.0			1961	US Navy	1985		
Thomson (1944)	SS-22	Submarine, Balao class	1,525.0		USS Springer (SS-414)	1961	US Navy	1972		
Simpson (1944)	SS-21	Submarine, Balao class	1,525.0		USS Spot (SS-413)	1962	US Navy	1982	Sold and used in the disaster film Fukkatsu no hi	
Riveros (1958)	DDG-18	Destroyer, Almirante class	3,300			1962	Vickers-Armstrongs	1998		
Araucana (1944)		Landing ship	1,095.0			1962		1964		
Cochrane (1944)	DD-15	Destroyer, Fletcher class	2,050		USS Rooks (DD-804)	1962	US Navy	1983		
Blanco Encalada	DD-14	Destroyer, Fletcher class	2,050		USS Wadleigh (DD-689)	1963	Bath Iron Works,	1983		
Fresia (1964)	PTF-81	Torpedo Boat, Jaguar class	134.0			1964	Bazán, Cádiz		Monument in Punta Arenas	
Guacolda (1964)	PTF-80	Torpedo boat, Jaguar class	134.0			1964	Bazán, Cádiz			
Janequeo (1943)	ATF-65	Tug, Abnaki class	1,589.0		USS ATF 109 Potowatomi	1964		1965	Sunk 15 August 1965, with loss of 55 men	
Águila (1945)	LST-91	Landing Ship Tank	3,982.0		USS LST 1092, USS ARVE-2 Aventinus	1964	US Navy	1980		
Videla (1964)		Hospital ship	140			1966	ASMAR	1998		
Tegualda (1966)	PTF-83	Torpedo boat, Jaguar class	134.0			1966	Bazán, Cádiz	2002		
Quidora (1965)	PTF-82	Torpedo boat, Jaguar class	134.0			1966	Bazán, Cádiz	2001		
Fuentealba (1966)		Patrol boat	15.0			1966	ASMAR	1998		
Pontoon Badger DD657		Pontoon, Destroyer Fletcher class			USS Charles J. Badger (DD-657)	1966	US Navy		Cannibalized for spare parts	
Orella (1944)	APD-27	Destroyer, Buckley class	1,400		USS Jack C. Robinson (APD-72), USS DE 671	1966	US Navy	1984		
Uribe (1943)	APD-29	Destroyer, Buckley class	1,740		USS Daniel T. Griffin (DE-54)	1966	US Navy	1995		
Riquelme (1943)	APD-28	Destroyer, Buckley class	1,400		USS Joseph E. Campbell (DE-70)	1966	US Navy	1984		
Serrano (1944)	APD-26	Destroyer, Buckley class	2,130		USS Odum (APD-71)	1967	US Navy	1991		
Odger (1966)		Patrol boat	215.0			1967	ASMAR	1997		
Aquiles (1953)		Transporter	2,660		Tjaldur	1967	Aalborg Shipyard	1988		
Río Bueno (1968)		Patrol boat	9.6			1968	Lafayette Shipyard, USA	1998		
Baquedano (1971)	PF-09	Frigate, Condell class (Leander)	2,790		HMS Ariadne (F72)	1970	Royal Navy	1998		
Hyatt (1970)	S-23	Submarine, Oberon class	2,030			1970	Scotts Shipbuilding and Engineering Company	2003		
Papudo (1970)		Anti-submarine	477.0			1971	ASMAR	1993		
Castor (1968)		Patrol boat	149.0			1971	ASMAR	1996		
Aldea (1943)	ATF-63	Tug, Abnaki class	1,589.0		USS Arikara (ATF-98)	1971	US Navy	1992		
Latorre (1945)	CL-04	Cruiser, Tre Kronor class	8,200		HSwMS Göta Lejon	1971	Swedish Navy	1986		
Fueguina (1972)		Landing ship				1972				
Beagle (1941)		Oil tanker, Patapsco class	1,850		USS Genesee (AOG-8)	1972	US Navy	1982		
Lynch (1972)	PFG-07	Frigate, Condell class (Leander)	2,500		BAE Morán Valverde (FM-02)	1972	Yarrow Shipbuilders	2007	Sold to Ecuador	
Condell (1970)	PFG-06	Frigate, Condell class (Leander)	2,500		BAE Eloy Alfaro (FM-01)	1972	Yarrow Shipbuilders	2007	Sold to Ecuador	*
Toro (1943)	LST-97	Landing ship	4,080			1973	US Navy	1977		
Araya (1945)	LST-89	Landing ship, LST-542 class	4,080		USS Nye County (LST-1067)	1974	US Navy	1981		
Hemmerdinger (1945)	LST-88	Landing ship, LST-542 class	1,490		USS New London County (LST-1066), MV Maquiserv	1974	US Navy	1983		
Zenteno (1944)	DD-16	Destroyer, Allen M. Sumner class	2,200		USS Charles S. Sperry (DD-697)	1974	US Navy	1990		*
Portales (1944)	DD-17	Destroyer, Allen M. Sumner class	2,200		USS Douglas H. Fox (DD-779)	1974	US Navy	1998		
O'Brien (1972)	S-22	Submarine, Oberon class	2,030			1976	Scotts Shipbuilding and Engineering Company	mid-2000s	Museum in Valdivia, Chile	
Angamos (1966)		Submarine-tender	4,416.0		Puerto Montt, Presidente Pedro Aguirre Cerda, Kobenhaven	1977				
Blanca Estela		Yacht				1978	Finland	1995		
Calle Calle		Landing ship				1978		1982		
Peuca		Landing ship				1978		1980		
Navarino (1953)		Transporter	2,347.0		Twara, Ville de Haipong	1978	Built in Scotland	1981		
Pillán (1979)	LPC-1801	Patrol boat, Anchova type	43.0			1980	Mac Laren Aco e Fibra S.A.			
Rano-Kau (1980)	LPC-1803	Patrol boat, Anchova type	43.0			1980	Mac Laren Aco e Fibra S.A.	1999		
Kimitahi (1980)		Patrol boat	48.0			1980	ASENAV	2000		
Corcovado (1980)	LPC-1805	Patrol boat, Anchova type	43.0			1980	Mac Laren Aco e Fibra S.A.	1999		
Tronador (1980)	LPC-1802	Patrol boat, Anchova type	43.0			1980	Mac Laren Aco e Fibra S.A.	1995		
Antuco (1980)	LPC-1807	Patrol boat, Anchova type	43.0			1980	Mac Laren Aco e Fibra S.A	1998		
Osorno (1981)	LPC-1808	Patrol boat, Anchova type	43.0			1980	Mac Laren Aco e Fibra S.A.	1999		
Choshuenco (1980)	LPC-1809	Patrol boat, Anchova type	43.0			1980	Mac Laren Aco e Fibra S.A.	1998		
Villarrica (1980)	LPC-1804	Patrol boat, Anchova type	43.0			1980	Mac Laren Aco e Fibra S.A.	2000		
Chadmo (1981)		Patrol boat	6.4			1981	Mc Laren de Río de Janeiro	1998		
Llaima (1981)	LPC-1806	Patrol boat, Anchova type	48.0			1981	Mac Laren Aco e Fibra S.A.	1998		
Capitán Prat (1967)	DLH-11	Destroyer, County class	6,100 full load		HMS Norfolk (D21)	1982	Royal Navy	2006		
Maipo (1981)		Landing ship, BATRAL class	1,409.0			1982	ASMAR	1998		
Guale (1982)	LPC-1811	Patrol boat, Anchova type	43.0		Zeus	1982	Mac Laren Aco e Fibra S.A	2000		
Copahue (1982)	LPC-1810	Patrol boat, Anchova type	43.0			1982	Mac Laren Aco e Fibra S.A.	2001		
Almirante Jorge Montt (1962)	AO-52	Oil tanker, Tide class	27,400		RFA Tidepool (A76)	1982	Royal Navy	1997		
Riáihue (1982)		Patrol boat	6.4			1982	Mc Laren de Río de Janeiro	1998		
Petrohue (1983)		Patrol boat	14.0			1983	ASENAV	1998		
Brito (1966)		Oil tanker	482.0		B/T Sylvia	1983	Marco Chilena	1999		
Águila (1957)		Transporter			Australgas	1984	Svendborg Skibsværft	1992		
Almirante Cochrane (1967)	DLH-12	Destroyer, County class	5,440		HMS Antrim (D18)	1984	Royal Navy	2006	Scrapped China.	*
Margarita María (1985)		Yacht			La Araucana	1985				
Almirante Latorre (1964)	DLG-14	Destroyer, County class	6,200 t displacement		HMS Glamorgan (D19)	1986	Royal Navy	1998		
Carmen Gloria (1987)		Yacht	6.7		Recluta	1987	Built in Argentina	1995		
Blanco Encalada (1964)	DLH-15	Destroyer, County class	6,200		HMS Fife (D20)	1988	Royal Navy	2003	Scrapped	
Janequeo (1974)		Tug	2,380		Maersk Transporter	1988	L.H. Salthammer Batbyggeri, Vestes, Norway	1998		
Iquique (1969)		Missile boat Sa'ar 3 class	250		Hamit	1989	Israeli Navy	2000		
Covadonga (1969)		Missile boat Sa'ar 3 class	250		Hefz	1989	Israeli Navy	2000		
Ministro Zenteno (1968)	PFG-08	Frigate, Condell class	2,500		HMS Achilles (F12)	1991	Royal Navy	2006		
Leucotón (1972)		Tug	1,750		RAM Lilen "Smit Lloyd 44"	1991		2008		
Colo Colo (1972)		Tug	1,750		RAM Lenga	1992		1999		
Vidal Gormaz (1964)	AGOR-60	Oceanographic research ship	1,200		USNS Thomas Washington (T-AGOR-10)	1992	US Navy	2010		
Valdivia (1970)	LST-93	Newport-class tank landing ship	8,550		USS San Bernardino (LST-1189)	1995	US Navy	2011		
Yelcho (1971)		Tug	272.0		Smit Kaylen	1996		1998		
Papudo (1975)		Missile boat, Sa'ar 4 class	450		Tarshish	1997	Israeli Navy	1998		
Uribe (1972)	LM-39	Tiger-class fast attack craft	265.0		S 41 Tiger	1998	Bundesmarine	2014		*
Riquelme (1972)	LM-36	Tiger-class fast attack craft	265.0		S 49 Wolf	1998	Bundesmarine	2012		[]
Serrano (1972)	LM-38	Tiger-class fast attack craft	265.0		S 60 Kranich	1998	Bundesmarine	2015		[]
Orella (1972)	LM-38	Tiger-class fast attack craft	265.0		S 54 Elster	1998	Bundesmarine	2015		[]
Araucano (1967)	AO-53	Replenishment oiler	17,000			1967	Burmeister & Wain, Denmark	2010		

== List of ships ordered or bought by the Chilean Navy, but never commissioned ==
List of ships ordered or bought by Chile but never commissioned
Shipname	Type	tonnage	Other names	Builder	Fate	URL
Pampero (1864)	bark-rigged screw steam corvette	1,600	Built as Texas for Confederacy. Sold to Chile by builder.	Clydebank	Captured at Madeira by the Spanish navy and named Tornado	
Constitución (1903)	Swiftsure-class battleship	12,175	HMS Swiftsure (1903)	Armstrong Whitworth	Purchased by UK as part of Pacts of May settlement ending arms race with Argentina	
Almirante Cochrane	Almirante Latorre-class battleship	21,850	Santiago, later Constitución and finally HMS Eagle (1918)	Armstrong Whitworth	Work stopped during war, purchased by UK from builder in 1918 for conversion to aircraft carrier	
Riveros	Almirante Lynch-class destroyer	1,700	HMS Tipperary (1915)	J. Samuel White, UK	bought by UK in 1914, sunk at battle of Jutland 1916	
Capitán Arturo Prat (1880)	unprotected cruiser	1,350	Japanese Tsukushi	Armstrong-Whitworth	Order cancelled by Chile, ship sold to Japan in 1883	
Libertad (1903)	Swiftsure-class battleship	12,175	HMS Triumph	Vickers, Barrow-in-Furness	Bought by UK after the Pacts of May	
Antofagasta (1913)	CC-class submarine	373	HMCS CC-2	Electric Boat Company/Seattle Construction and Drydock Company	bought from builder by Canada at the beginning of the WWI	
Iquique (1913)	CC-class submarine	373	HMCS CC-1	Electric Boat Company/Seattle Construction and Drydock Company	bought from builder by Canada at the beginning of WWI	
Águila (1941)	Corvette	1,026		Alberto Daiber Shipyard	Never completed, boilers in Europe during the WWII	

== List of ships under Chilean Letter of marque ==
On 20 November 1817 the Chilean government, under Bernardo O'Higgins issued a Letter of marque, a decree authorizing private persons to attack and capture enemy vessels and bring them before courts for condemnation and sale.

List of ships under Chilean Letter of marque
Shipname	Type	t	Other names	Year	Property of	Guns	Prizes	Reference
Santiago Bueras (1817)	Brigantine	200.0	Lancaster	1817	Gregorio Cordovéz	12	Los Ángeles, Resolución	
El Chileno (1817)	Brigantine		Adeline	1817	Felipe S. de Solar	12	Saetas, Diamante, Inspectora, Balero and San Antonio	
La Fortuna (1817)	Boat	20	Death or Glory	1817	Budge and MacKay		Minerva	
La Fortuna (1817)	Schooner	180.0	Catalina		MacKay	10	San Miguel and Gran Poder	
Minerva (1817)	Boat			1817	Budge and MacKay	12	Santa María	
Maipú (1818)	Brigantine			1818	José M. Manterola		San Antonio, Lanzafuego Providencia, Buena Esperanza	
Congreso (1817)	Schooner			1818	J.A. Turner		Empecinado, Golondrina, San Pedro Regalado	
Nuestra Señora del Carmen (1818)	Schooner		Better known as Furioso	1818	Manuel Antonio Boza	1	Nuestra Señora de Dolores,Machete	
Rosa de los Andes (1818)	Corvette	400.0	Rose	1819		36	Tres Hermanas	
Coquimbo (1818)			Avon later Chacabuco (1818)	1818				

== Bibliography ==
- Adamson, Robert E. & de St. Hubert, Christian (1991). "Question 12/89". Warship International. XXVIII (2): 199–205. ISSN 0043-0374.
