= Chilean ship Janequeo =

Janequeo is a female Mapudungun name and the name of a famous woman who defeated the Spaniards during the Arauco War. Several ships of the Chilean Navy have been named Janequeo

- Janequeo (1836), ex-brigantine Isaac Macen
- Janequeo (1879), torpedo boat sunk off Callao
- Janequeo (1881) torpedo boat to replace the 1879 boat lost off Callao
- Janequeo (1929) ATA-70, a tug
- Janequeo (1943) ATF-65, a tug of the Abnaki class, ex-USS Potowatomi, sunk on 15 August 1965 with a loss of 55 men
- Janequeo (1974), a tug
- Janequeo (2016) ATF-65, an anchor handling tug supply vessel
