= Janequeo =

Janequeo, may mean:

- Janequeo (lonco) or Yanequén, a 16th-century woman lonco and heroine of the Mapuche-Pehuenche people
- 2028 Janequeo, an asteroid
- Chilean ship Janequeo, several ships of the Chilean Navy
  - Chilean tugboat Janequeo, a Chilean Navy tug 1963—1965
