= Chilean frigate Monteagudo =

History

Spain
- Name: Las Caldas
- Launched: 1751
- Renamed: Milagro
- Captured: 24 Jule 1821
- Fate: Captured in Callao by the Chilean Navy under Thomas Cochrane; Sold to the Peruvian as Merchant ship, later to the Peruvian Navy as Monteagudo

Peru–Bolivian Confederation
- Name: Monteagudo
- Namesake: Bernardo de Monteagudo
- Fate: Lend to Chilean insurgent Ramon Freire for $4,400 per anno; Crew handed the ship over to the Chilean government on 4 August 1836

Chile
- Name: Monteagudo
- Fate: Grounded in Valparaíso on 24 Jule 1839

General characteristics
- Tonnage: 980 t
- Sail plan: Frigate
- Armament: 4 guns 18 lbs and 7 guns 12 lbs

The frigate Monteagudo was involved in important events of the first decades of the Republics of Chile and Peru. As in many other cases, the origin of the ship is unknown, although it is known that she was named Las Caldas and later Milagro.

== Capture by the First Chilean Navy Squadron ==
On 24 July 1824 Commander Thomas Crosby of the First Chilean Navy Squadron captured the Spanish ships Milagro, (property of Vicente Benito Larriva), San Fernando and Resolución, during the Blockade of Callao by the ships of the Freedom Expedition of Perú. Milagro was in service for the Chilean Navy until José de San Martín ordered to return the ship to its owner. But Cochrane stopped the frigate until the full payment of $5,000 for the prize. Later she was renamed Monteagudo and was commissioned by the Peruvian Navy.

== Career in the Peruvian Navy ==
Monteagudo was used as transporter for the troops of Simón Bolívar.

In 1836 Andrés de Santa Cruz created the Peru-Bolivian Confederation and challenged the status quo in South America.

Allegedly due to exhausted finances, the ships of the Peruvian Navy Monteagudo and the brig Orbegoso (as well as the corvette Libertad) were advertised on 4 May 1836 in "El Redactor Peruano", Nº 54, a Lima newspaper, and chartered in a dubious operation to unknown ship brokers. They handed over the ships to Ramon Freire, a Chilean exiled head of state in Lima who pretended his return to the presidency of Chile. He was also furnished with men, arms, and ammunition in a conjoint scheme of General Orbegoso and Santa Cruz against the existing administration of Chile.

== Ramon Freire's Expedition to Chile ==
On 3 July 1836 sailed bound to Chiloé the brigantine Orbegoso under the command of Freire, and on 7 July Monteagudo under the command of Puga.

During the voyage, Monteagudo crew rose against Freire's partizans on board and proceeded to Valparaíso to deliver the ship and the prisoners to the Chilean authorities.

Freire on Orbegoso, ignorant of what had happened, continued the route to Chiloé where the authorities surrendered to Freire without resistance.

The Chilean government had been informed about the plot, and Diego Portales, defense minister of the government ordered Monteagudo manned with loyal crew and troops to Chiloé. As she arrived, Freire, assuming the ship was still under the command of Puga, ordered Puga to land with his men. This was executed and thus admitted into the fort. The troops of the fort, informed of the situation returned to the Chilean authorities and Freire was arrested.

Simultaneously to the capture of Freire in Chiloé, Portales ordered Aquiles and Colo Colo to capture the naval ships of the Peru-Bolivian Confederation anchored in Callao, without a declaration of war. They captured on 21 August 1836 the ships Santa Cruz, the brig Arequipeño and the schooner Peruviana.

== The War of the Confederation ==
On 30 August 1836 the Chilean plenipotentiary Mariano Egaña arrived to Callao with the ships Monteagudo, Colo Colo, Valparaíso, Aquiles, and Orgeboso to negotiate a treaty based on several points: the payments of the outstanding international debts owed by Peru to Chile, the limitation of the outstanding armies, commercial agreements, compensation to Chile for the Freire Expedition, and the dissolution of the Confederation. Santa Cruz agreed to everything but the dissolution. Chile responded by declaring war on 28 December 1836.

Monteagudo participated in the Battle of Islay, The result was mostly a stalemate that did not affect the course of the war.

She sunk in a gale off Valparaiso on 24 July 1839. Her crew were rescued.

== See also ==
- List of decommissioned ships of the Chilean Navy
