= Chilean torpedo boat Colo Colo =

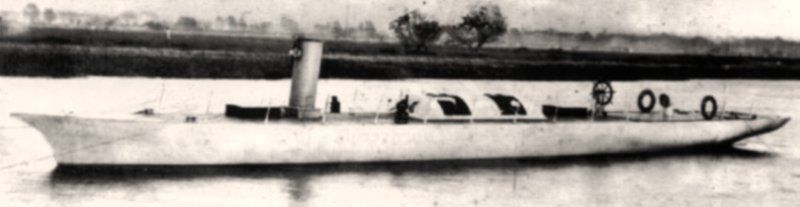
- Colo Colo in 1880

History

Chile
- Name: Colo Colo
- Namesake: Colo Colo
- Builder: Yarrow & Company, Poplar
- Yard number: 476
- Launched: 1880
- Commissioned: 1880
- Out of service: 1885 or 1915

General characteristics
- Class & type: Colo Colo-class torpedo boat
- Displacement: 5 t / 30 t
- Length: 14.63 m (48 ft)
- Beam: 2.44 m (8.0 ft)
- Installed power: 1 boiler; 60 ihp (45 kW)
- Propulsion: 1 × shaft; 1 × Reciprocating double-expansion steam engine
- Speed: 12.5 knots (14.4 mph; 23.2 km/h)
- Armament: 2 × Hotchkiss guns; 2 × 14-inch spar torpedoes

Colo Colo was a Colo Colo-class torpedo boat built for the Chilean Navy in 1880. The torpedo boat participated in the War of the Pacific, where it fought in the blockade of Callao and patrolled Lake Titicaca in the final phase of that war.

== Design ==
Torpedo boat Colo Colo was built in 1880 by the British shipyard Yarrow & Company in Poplar, England, bearing the construction number 476. Along with the torpedo boat Tucapel, it belonged to the Colo Colo-class.

The Colo Colo-class was a port defense torpedo boat of dimensions that allowed it to be transported by larger ships to its area of operations. She could also be transformed into a passenger transport ship.

=== Class specifications ===
The Colo Colo-class was a steel-hulled third class torpedo boat. She was 14.63 m (48 ft) long overall and 2.44 m (8.0 ft) in beam. The displacement, depending on the sources, was from 5 to 30 tons. The hull was made of galvanized steel and the sides were provided with vertical reinforcements with a special arrangement to solidly fit the boat and be able to hoist it to the deck or side davits. The bow was straight and had a corrugated chimney.

They were powered by a two-cylinder of double-expansion reciprocating vertical steam engine, without condenser, driving a shaft using steam produced by a forced-draft locomotive boiler. The boat could steam at a top speed of 12.5 knots (14.4 mph; 23.2 km/h) from 60 ihp (45 kW).

The boats' armament consisted of two Hotchkiss guns and two 14-inch spar torpedoes. In addition, the bow was reinforced so that they could ram a ship of the same size or a little larger.

Being of very light construction, like all torpedo boats, they were covered from bow to stern with a thin steel plate to somewhat protect the steam engines and the crew. They were narrow boats for the crew, making life on board difficult.

== Service ==
Colo Colo arrived in Valparaíso in 1880 along with Tucapel and offshore torpedo boat Fresia. The first two arrived in boxes in parts and were later assembled. These and other torpedo boats, built in British shipyards for Chile, arrived in this country during the War of the Pacific. Chilean buyers had to use tricks to evade Britain's neutrality laws.

When Colo Colo entered service that year, she was assigned number 2 in the Chilean Navy's torpedo boat fleet and, together with Tucapel, were the most modern torpedo boats reinforcing the Chilean squadron as of November.

=== Blockade of Callao ===
Colo Colo participated, during the naval campaign, in the blockade of Callao together with the torpedo boats Tucapel, Fresia and Guacolda. Her mission was to patrol, explore and engage Peruvian boats and torpedo boats. On 6 December, Colo Colo under the Midshipman Gaspar García Pica distinguished himself in the fight against Peruvian vessels of the Callao. In the early morning of that day, the torpedo boats of both sides ran into each other and engaged. The engagement was later joined by the largest Chilean ships under Commander Óscar Viel y Toro and the Peruvian coastal batteries. The engagement lasted about an hour, after which both parties withdrew. (Note: On the Chilean side, the torpedo boats Fresia, Colo Colo, Tucapel and Guacolda participated, together with the ironclad Húascar, the corvette Pilcomayo and the auxiliary cruiser Angamos. On the Peruvian side were four torpedo boats, supported by the Callao batteries. In the engagement, the Fresia was sunk, but was later refloated and returned to service.)

On 12 February 1881, after the end of the blockade of Callao, Colo Colo along with the other torpedo boats were returned to Valparaíso since they were no longer needed. Colo Colo along with Tucapel were embarked on the steamship Pisagua, while Fresia and Guacolda were towed by the same steamship.

=== Titicaca Lake ===
Chilean movements in the Arequipa-Puno campaign in 1883, in the final phase of the War of the Pacific

In November 1883 Colo Colo was assigned to patrol Lake Titicaca, carrying out one of the most picturesque and unknown naval operations of the war. By then the Chilean forces had occupied the city of Arequipa, on 27 October, and the lake port of Puno, on 4 November, and they needed to control the lake on which that port was located. Lake Titicaca served as a means of communication between Peru and Bolivia, in addition to the fact that Chileans were harassed and spied on in Puno from that lake by vessels and it was necessary to pressure Bolivia, which could still provide support to Peru. For this reason, the Chilean command decided to send Colo Colo to the lake. The torpedo boat, in port of Mollendo, was disarmed and prepared to be transported by rail to Puno, where it was assembled and put into service to patrol Lake Titicaca. Command of the torpedo boat was handed over to First Lieutenant Angel Custodio Lynch Irving, with twenty-six crew.

The presence of the Colo Colo in the lake prevented communications through this route and its use for military purposes, and the Peruvian vessels that had taken refuge in the vicinity surrendered to the Chilean authorities in the area under Colonel Diego Dublé Almeyda. The deployment of the torpedo boat also induced the Bolivian government to agree to a peace treaty with Chile in 1884. With this mission, the torpedo boat marked the historic milestone of being the first foreign warship to navigate the highest navigable waters in the world (Note: Titicaca is the highest navigable lake in the world with an average altitude of 3,812 meters above sea level.) and demonstrated the ability of the Chilean Navy to deploy in support of land forces.

After completing her mission in the Altiplano, Colo Colo returned to Chile, being transported on a larger ship to Valparaíso, to later support the hydrographic works. In 1885, Colo Colo was scrapped in that port, although there is also information that she would have been discarded along with Tucapel around 1915.

== See also ==
- List of decommissioned ships of the Chilean Navy
- Torpedo boats in the War of the Pacific
