= Battle of Islay =

Coordinates: 17.019836°S 72.016052°W

- Part of the War of the Confederation
Date	January 12 and 13, 1838
Location	Near Islay in Peru
Result	Inconclusive

Belligerents
Chile	Peru–Bolivian Confederation

Commanders and leaders
Roberto Simpson	Juan J. Panizo

Strength
1 frigate 2 corvettes 2 brigantines	1 corvette 2 brigantines

The Battle of Islay (Spanish: Batalla de Islay or Combate Naval de Islay) occurred on January 12 and 13, 1838, during the War of the Confederation between Chile and the Peru–Bolivian Confederation.

== Background ==
After the Treaty of Paucarpata had been repudiated, the Chilean government again dispatched its fleet of 5 battleships (Aquiles and Arequipeño, the corvettes Libertad and Valparaíso and the Monteagudo) under the command of Roberto Simpson, to disrupt Peruvian commerce. On January 12, 1838, they met a Confederate squadron near the Peruvian port of Islay in what is known as the Naval Battle of Islay. The Confederate squadron was conformed by the Socabaya, Junín and Fundador under the command of commander Juan José Panizo. Simpson attacked, but Panizo managed to head him off for several hours until he escaped under the cover of darkness. Both sides claimed victory, but the result was mostly a stalemate ans did not affect the course of the war.

Marshal Andres de Santa Cruz had distributed his ships, the corvette Socabaya and the brig Founder in Islay, commanded by the frigate Captain Juan José Panizo and the brig Junín in Arica, commanded by Commander Miguel Saldívar.

On January 3, 1838, Commander Miguel Saldivar learned that Chile had rejected the treaty and that his squadron was heading to Peru and so he sailed to Islay to concentrate the Confederate naval forces, anchoring in that port on January 8.

== Battle ==
On January 12, 1838, the Chilean squadron surprised the Confederates in Islay, which largely surpassed in tonnage and fire hydrants fled to the north being persecuted by Simpson. The pursuit lasted all night and turned the Confederate ships to shoot the corvette Libertad, whose greater speed had allowed it to overtake the rest of its squad to continue the flight. Meanwhile the slowest of the Confederate ships brig, Junín, had lagged behind, which would continue to force the other two Confederate ships to engage in unfavorable combat or to abandon it and continue north.

Before that situation, Panizo used a clever stratagem by turning around, and the Socabaya and the Founder broke fire on the Chilean ships, which delayed them and allowed the Junin to gain distance. They then turned again towards the north. Three times, he performed the same maneuver until the Junín was out of danger, and the darkness of the night made Simpson order to stop the pursuit, and he continued to Callao, where he arrived on January 17.

== Aftermath ==
The controversy over the outcome of the battle is very similar to what occurred during the Battle of Chipana during the War of the Pacific. Peruvian historiography maintains that it was a Confederate victory because Commander Panizo managed to prevent his ships from being captured or sunk by a materially-superior enemy and saved even the slowest of his ships and successfully responded to enemy fire in its retreat. Chilean historiography considers the battle as a minor action of the war, and the Confederate fleet managed only to fleeing thanks to Panizo's expertise in which Simpson did not continue the fight because the Confederate ships were owners from the favorable side of the wind.

== Bibliography ==
- del Busto Duthurburu, José Antonio (1983). Compendio de la historia del Perú II.
- de la Puente Brunke, José. Los hombres del mar: la Marina de Guerra en la historia del Perú.
