= Chilean submarine O'Brien =

Coordinates: 39.816066°S 73.249317°W

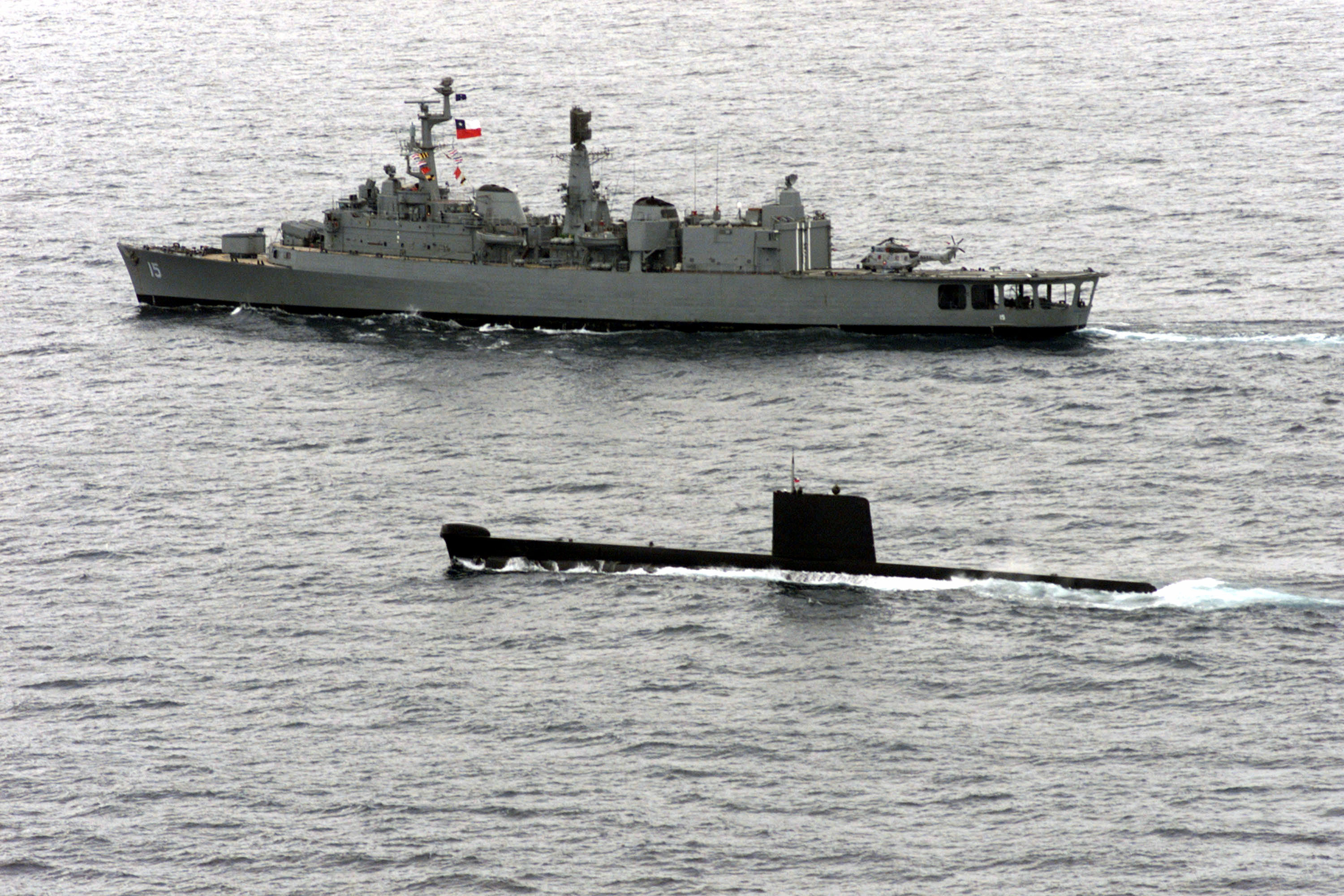
- O'Brien (S22) in 1999

History

Chile
- Name: O'Brien
- Namesake: John Thomond O'Brien
- Builder: Scott Lithgow
- Laid down: 17 January 1971
- Launched: 21 December 1972
- Commissioned: 15 April 1976
- Decommissioned: 2005?
- Identification: S22
- Status: Museum ship

General characteristics
- Class & type: Oberon-class submarine
- Displacement: Surface 2,030 tons, Submerged 2,410 tons
- Length: 295.2 ft (90.0 m)
- Beam: 26.5 ft (8.1 m)
- Draught: 18 ft (5.5 m)
- Propulsion: 2 × Admiralty Standard Range 16WS - ASR diesels. 3,680bhp 2 electric generators. 2560kw. 2 electric motors. 6000shp. 2 shafts
- Speed: Surface 12 knots (22 km/h; 14 mph), Submerged 17 knots (31 km/h; 20 mph)
- Endurance: 9,000 nautical miles (17,000 km; 10,000 mi) at 12 knots (22 km/h; 14 mph) surfaced
- Complement: 65
- Sensors & processing systems: Atlas Elektronik CSU 90 suite, BAC Type 2007 flank array
- Armament: 6 21-inch (533 mm) torpedo tubes, 22 torpedoes

The Chilean submarine O'Brien is an Oberon-class submarine, formerly of the Chilean Navy.

== Design and construction ==
The submarine, built by Scottish company Scott Lithgow, was laid down on 17 January 1971, and launched on 21 December 1972. The planned July 1974 completion was delayed by the need to redo internal cabling. She was commissioned into the Chilean Navy on 15 April 1976. The submarine was named after John Thomond O'Brien, who fought in the Chilean War of Independence.

== Operational history ==
Following her commissioning on 15 April 1976, O’Brien sailed to Chile, arriving at Punta Arenas on 10 August 1976. She served as one of the Chilean Navy’s two Oberon-class submarines alongside Hyatt. The submarines formed part of Chile’s submarine force throughout the late Cold War and remained in service until the early 2000s. In 1997, Chile contracted for the construction of two Scorpène-class submarines to replace the aging Oberon-class boats.

== Decommissioning and fate ==
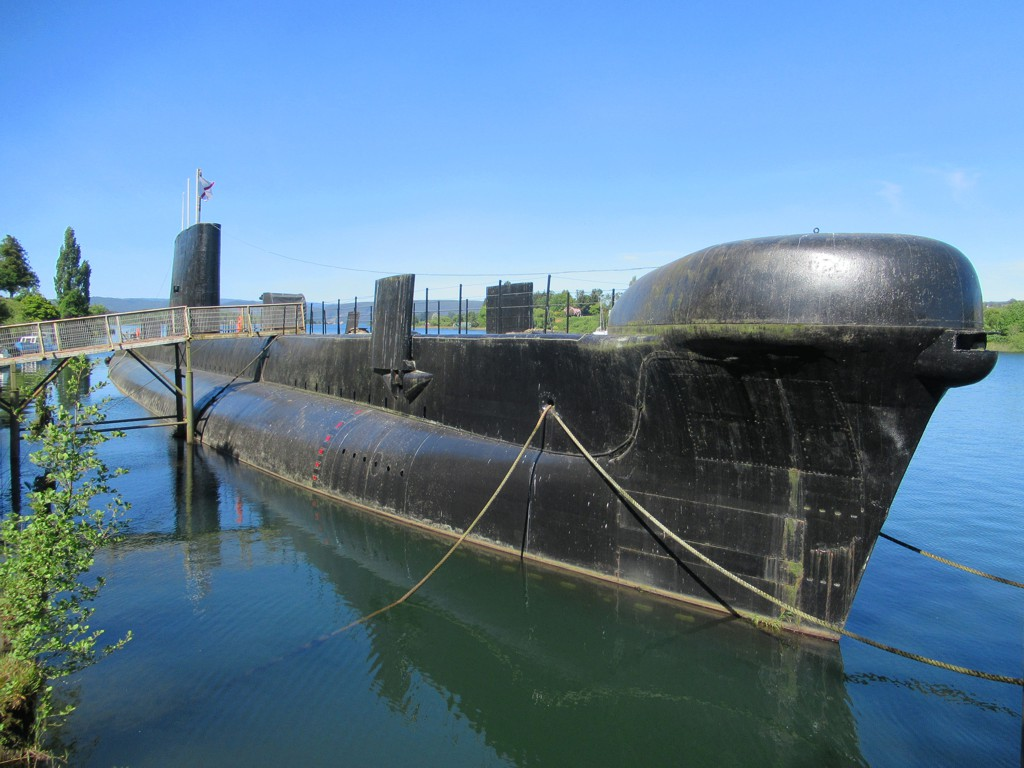
The museum in 2019

O'Brien and sister boat Hyatt were replaced by the Thomson-class submarines.

She is now permanently docked in the Chilean city of Valdivia where she is open to visitors as a museum ship. Her sister boat, HMS Ocelot can be visited in Chatham Historic Dockyard in England.

== See also ==
- List of active Chilean Navy ships
- List of decommissioned ships of the Chilean Navy
