= John Thomond O'Brien =

Irish soldier and officer in the Argentine Army (1786–1861)

John Thomond O’Brien
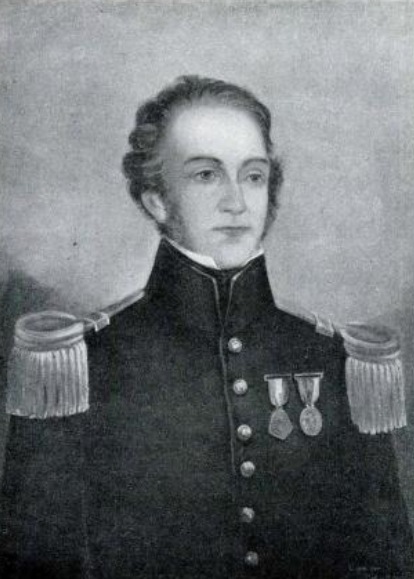
- Born: Juan Thomond O'Brien; 1786; County Wicklow
- Died: 1861 (aged 74–75); Lisbon, Portugal
- Occupation: Military personnel

John Thomond O'Brien (1786–1861), also known in Spanish as Juan Thomond O'Brien, was an Argentine Army officer born in 1786 in Baltinglass, County Wicklow, son of Martin O'Brien and Honoria O'Connor. Martin O'Brien owned a bleach-green affiliated with the cotton factory run by the Orr family at Stratford-on-Slaney. Martin was the son of Andrew O'Brien (d. 1798), a son of Donald O'Brien of Waterford who, in turn, was an illegitimate son of William O'Brien, 3rd Earl of Inchiquin. John Thomond O'Brien went on to fight in the Chilean War of Independence.

== Career ==
John Thomond O'Brien left Ireland and arrived in Buenos Aires in 1812 to open a merchant house. On his way there, his ship crashed onto the rocks of Fernando Po Island in west Africa. Only he and a few others survived to continue their journey.

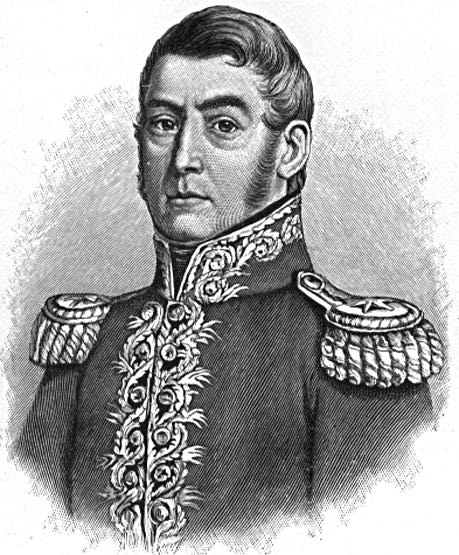
O'Brien would become aide-de-camp to General San Martín

Soon after arriving in Buenos Aires, the local people gave him the name Don Juan O'Brien. He enlisted in the army and fought in Uruguay with General Miguel Estanislao Soler. In 1816 O'Brien joined General José de San Martín's mounted grenadiers regiment in the Andes army. After the battle of Chacabuco, he was promoted to captain and appointed aide-de-camp to General San Martín.

O'Brien fought in the Second Battle of Cancha Rayada and at Battle of Maipú. In 1821, he was promoted to colonel, and died in 1861 in Lisbon, Portugal while returning to South America.

== Honours ==
In 1938 John (Juan) Thomond O'Brien's remains were sent back to Argentina where he received an official funeral. On January 23, 2017 his remains were again reinterred with military honours in Mendoza, Argentina. A town was also named after him, as was the Chilean Oberon-class submarine O'Brien.

In 2006 a plaque was placed on the library of Baltinglass reading, in part, "In memory of General John Thomond O'Brien ... Hero of the independence wars of Chile, Uruguay, Argentina, and Peru."

== Sources ==
- Fanning, Tim (2020). Don Juan O'Brien. Cork University Press. p. 185. ISBN 9781782053828.
- Lawlor, Chris; McDonnell, Donal, eds. (2006). General O'Brien: West Wicklow to South America. West Wicklow Historical Society. ISBN 9780953294725.
