= Chilean corvette Constitución =

History

Chile
- Name: Constitución
- Namesake: Constitución, Chile
- Operator: Chilean Navy
- Commissioned: 1851
- Decommissioned: 1856

General characteristics
- Class & type: Corvette
- Tons burthen: 644 t
- Length: 124 ft 5 in (37.92 m)
- Beam: 32 ft 5 in (9.88 m)
- Sail plan: corvette
- Complement: 179 men
- Armament: 18 × 24 pounder

The Chilean corvette Constitución was built by the Juan Duprat shipyard in Valparaíso in 1847, under a Chilean law passed that same year, and was launched on 19 January 1851. It was the first warship manufactured entirely in Chile, with the exception of the guns, which were produced in France. The copper plates for protecting the hull were produced by Lambert in Coquimbo.

During the revolution of 1851 she adhered to the cause of the government.

Constitución was decommissioned in 1856 and disarmed in 1857.
