= Chilean frigate Lota =

19th-century Chilean frigate owned by Federico Peede

History

Chile
- Name: Lota
- Namesake: Lota, Chile
- Builder: in Brunswick
- Launched: 1866
- Commissioned: 1851
- Fate: Sank 19 September 1888

General characteristics
- Displacement: 1,047 t
- Length: 57 m

Lota was a Chilean frigate owned by Federico Peede. During the War of the Pacific she was operated by the Chilean Navy and was part of the expedition of Patricio Lynch to Pisco and Paracas in 1880. After the war she was handed back to her owner.

She sailed usually from San Francisco and Vancouver to Melbourne and Newcastle, Australia carrying wood and back to Valparaíso carrying coal from Australia.

Lota began her last voyage from San Francisco on 12 February 1888, loaded with wood. She arrived at Melbourne on 13 May. On 26 July she sailed bound for Newcastle (NSW), arriving on 3 August. On 16 August she left Newcastle for Valparaíso, carrying 1,496 tons of coal.

On 19 September 1888 the Lota foundered 10 miles off (an unspecified) "Palmer Island", possibly west of Fiji.

Only two members of the crew survived the shipwreck: Herman Johnson, a boatswain and Scotsman resident in Chile, and a sixteen-year-old Chilean, Ramón Rojas. They lived alone in the uninhabited island and had no equipment at all. They were able to gather provisions on the island to enable them to survive. Ramón Rojas died in 1890. Johnson was rescued by a German ship in 1893 and brought to Hamburg; in 1895 he went back to Coronel, Chile to rejoin his wife and son.
