= USS New London County =

1945 LST-542-class tank landing ship

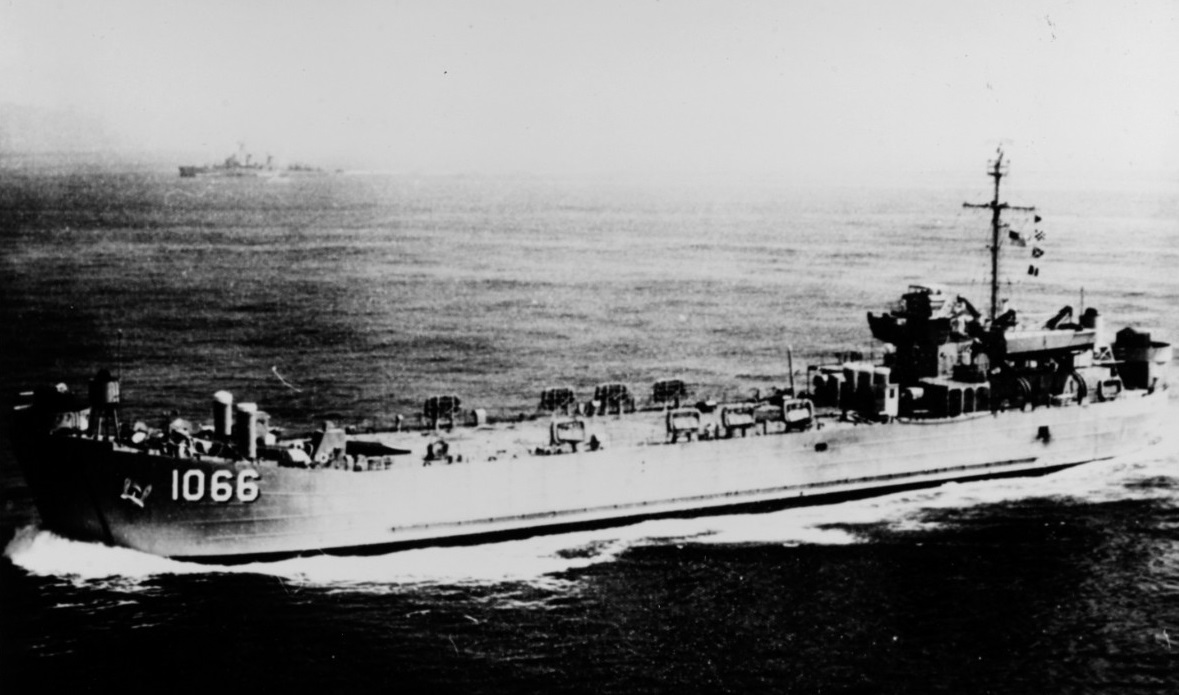
- USS New London County (LST-1066), ex-LST-1066, photographed during the 1950s.

History

United States
- Name: LST-1066; New London County
- Namesake: New London County, Connecticut
- Builder: Bethlehem-Hingham Shipyard, Hingham, Massachusetts
- Yard number: 3456
- Laid down: 18 January 1945
- Launched: 21 February 1945
- Commissioned: 20 March 1945
- Decommissioned: March 1946
- Identification: Hull symbol: LST-1066; Code letters: NAIF
- Renamed: New London County, 1 July 1955
- Recommissioned: 21 December 1965
- Decommissioned: 27 February 1967
- Fate: Transferred to the Military Sea Transportation Service (MSTS)

United States
- Name: New London County
- Operator: MSTS
- Acquired: 27 February 1967
- Stricken: 10 June 1973
- Identification: Hull symbol: T-LST-1066
- Fate: Sold to Chilean Navy, August 1973

Chile
- Name: Comandante Hemmerdinger
- Namesake: Claudio Hemmerdinger
- Acquired: August 1973
- Out of service: 14 October 1983
- Identification: Hull symbol: LST-88
- Fate: Sold for operation, 19 January 1984

Chile
- Name: Maquiserv
- Acquired: 19 January 1984
- Fate: Fate unknown

General characteristics
- Class & type: LST-542-class tank landing ship
- Displacement: 1,625 long tons (1,651 t) (light); 4,080 long tons (4,145 t) (full (seagoing draft with 1,675 short tons (1,520 t) load); 2,366 long tons (2,404 t) (beaching)
- Length: 328 ft (100 m) oa
- Beam: 50 ft (15 m)
- Draft: Unloaded: 2 ft 4 in (0.71 m) forward; 7 ft 6 in (2.29 m) aft; Full load: 8 ft 3 in (2.51 m) forward; 14 ft 1 in (4.29 m) aft; Landing with 500 short tons (450 t) load: 3 ft 11 in (1.19 m) forward; 9 ft 10 in (3.00 m) aft; Limiting 11 ft 2 in (3.40 m); Maximum navigation 14 ft 1 in (4.29 m)
- Installed power: 2 × 900 hp (670 kW) Electro-Motive Diesel 12-567A diesel engines; 1,800 shp (1,300 kW)
- Propulsion: 1 × Falk main reduction gears; 2 × Propellers
- Speed: 11.6 kn (21.5 km/h; 13.3 mph)
- Range: 24,000 nmi (44,000 km; 28,000 mi) at 9 kn (17 km/h; 10 mph) while displacing 3,960 long tons (4,024 t)
- Boats & landing craft carried: 2 x LCVPs
- Capacity: 1,600–1,900 short tons (3,200,000–3,800,000 lb; 1,500,000–1,700,000 kg) cargo depending on mission
- Troops: 16 officers, 147 enlisted men
- Complement: 13 officers, 104 enlisted men
- Armament: Varied, ultimate armament; 2 × twin 40 mm (1.57 in) Bofors guns; 4 × single 40 mm Bofors guns; 12 × 20 mm (0.79 in) Oerlikon cannons

Service record
- Part of: LST Flotilla 33
- Awards: World War II; American Campaign Medal; Asiatic–Pacific Campaign Medal; World War II Victory Medal; Navy Occupation Service Medal w/Asia Clasp; Vietnam War; National Defense Service Medal; Armed Forces Expeditionary Medal; Vietnam Service Medal; Republic of Vietnam Gallantry Cross Unit Citation; Republic of Vietnam Campaign Medal

USS New London County (LST-1066) was an LST-542-class tank landing ship in the United States Navy. Unlike many of her class, which received only numbers and were disposed of after World War II, she survived long enough to be named. Originally nameless, on 1 July 1955, all LSTs still in commission were named for US counties or parishes; LST-1066 was given the name New London County, after the county in Connecticut.

== Construction ==
LST-1066 was laid down on 18 January 1945, at Hingham, Massachusetts, by the Bethlehem-Hingham Shipyard; launched on 21 February 1945; sponsored by Miss Cynthia L. Rowan; and commissioned on 20 March 1945.

== Service history ==
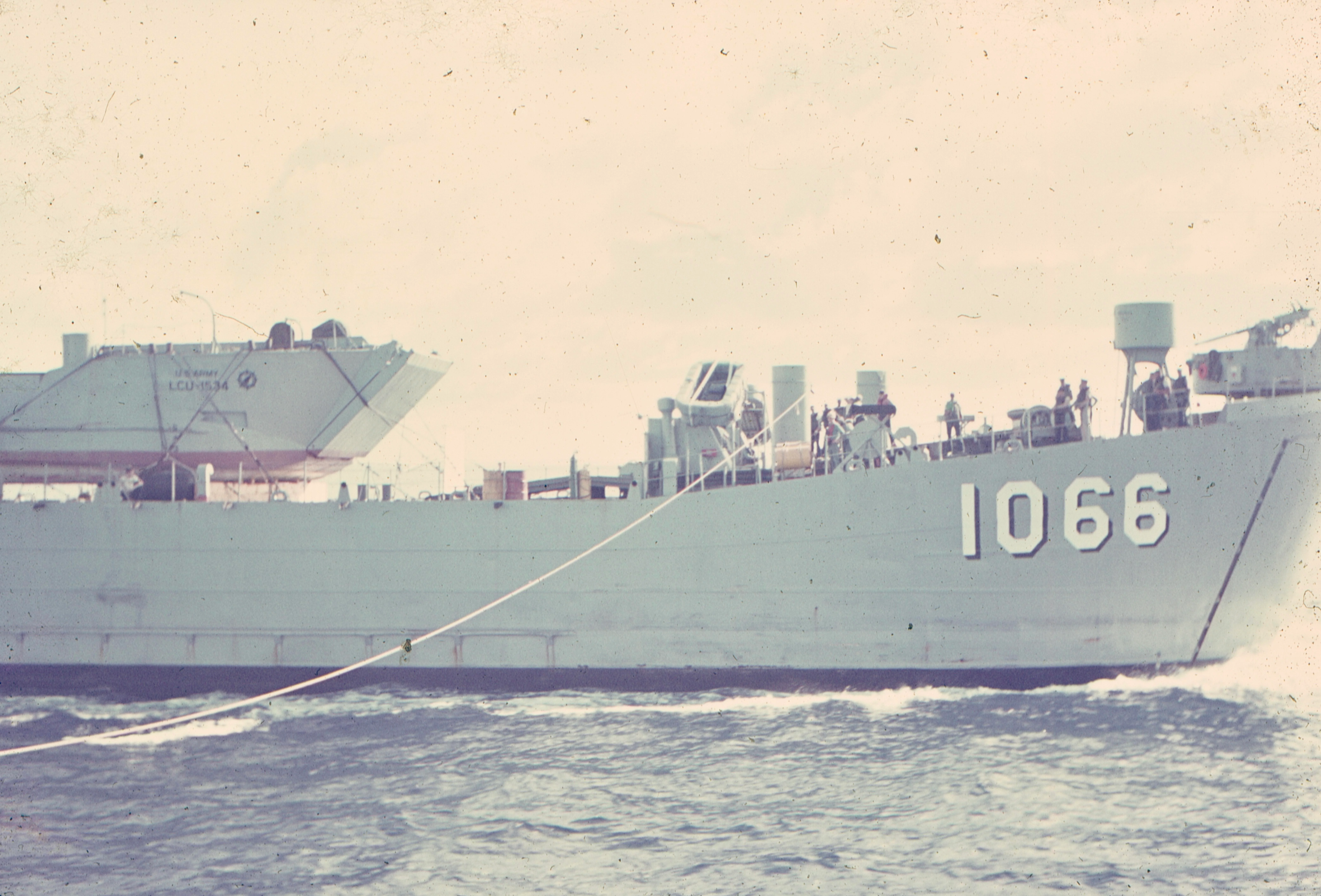
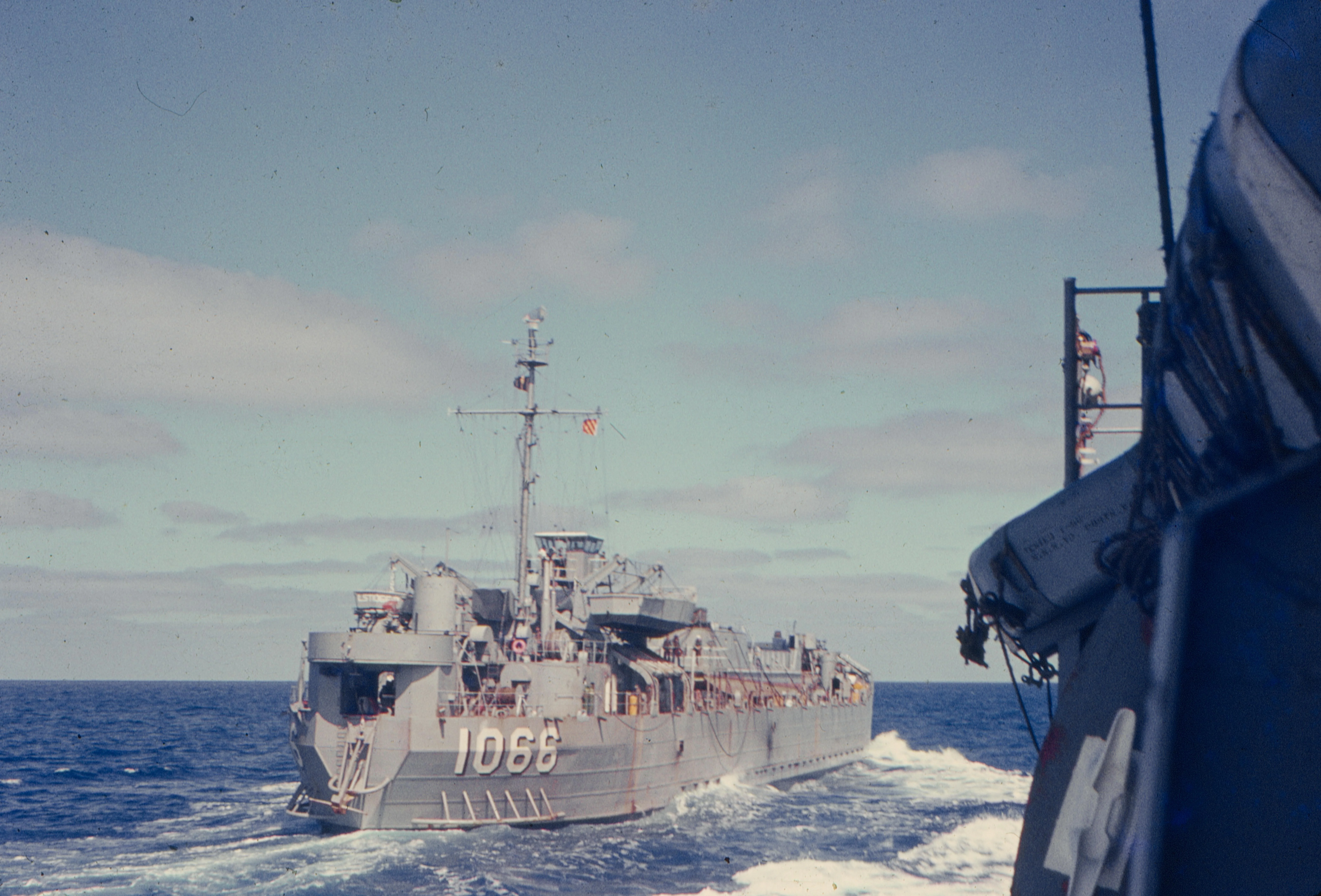
USS New London County underway at sea in February 1966

=== World War II ===
Following shakedown the newly designated flagship of LST Group 99 departed New York 11 May 1945, in convoy for the Western Pacific. Three months later, having transited the Panama Canal, LST–1066 reached Leyte, Philippines via the Marshall and Caroline Islands. After transferring ammunition to fleet ships, she sailed 18 October, from Lingayen Gulf, Luzon, on the first of two voyages transporting elements of the 6th Army to the Japanese home islands of Honshū and Shikoku for occupation duty.

=== Post-war ===
On 30 November, she joined the procession of ships old and new steaming homeward and arrived San Pedro, California, 13 January 1946. In March 1946, placed out of commission in the reserve, LST–1066 joined the Pacific Reserve Fleet in Puget Sound.

Though given a name, New London County (LST 1066), on 1 July 1955, the ship remained inactive until the aftermath of the Cuban Missile Crisis of 1962. The Navy placed several LSTs in commission in reserve and created ResLSTRon TWO at Little Creek, Virginia. New London County joined this squadron 19 June 1963. Beaching and other training exercises commenced in the fall of 1963, and found real application during the Dominican Republic crisis in the spring of 1965. The escalating war in Vietnam, a country with limited port facilities, caused New London County and her sister ships to be placed in full commission 21 December 1965. After a brief yard period and some intensive refresher training at Pearl Harbor the squadron reached the Western Pacific in April 1966.

=== Vietnam War ===
Home ported at Sasebo, Japan this landing ship spent much of her time unloading supplies, especially cement, along the central coast of South Vietnam. In February 1967, new orders directed the ship to Pusan, South Korea. There she decommissioned on 27 February, and was turned over to the Military Sea Transportation Service (MSTS) in whose service she continued to sail during 1969. On 13 January 1970, while back off the Vietnamese coast, she was damaged by an underwater explosion. She was subsequently towed to Da Nang for repairs.

== Awards ==
- Asiatic-Pacific Campaign Medal
- World War II Victory Medal
- Navy Occupation Medal with "ASIA" clasp
- National Defense Service Medal
- Vietnam Service Medal with two battle stars

== Chilean Navy service ==
In August 1973, New London County was sold to Chile where she served as Comandante Hemmerdinger (LST-88), in the Chilean Navy. She was taken out of service on 14 October 1983, and sold for commercial service, 19 January 1984, renamed M/V Maquiserv, Chilean flagged, out of Valparaíso. Her fate from that point is unknown.

== Bibliography ==
Online resources

- "LST-1066". Dictionary of American Naval Fighting Ships. Naval History and Heritage Command. This article incorporates text from this source, which is in the public domain.
- "New London County". Dictionary of American Naval Fighting Ships. Naval History and Heritage Command. 13 August 2015. This article incorporates text from this source, which is in the public domain.
- "Bethlehem-Hingham, Hingham MA". www.ShipbuildingHistory.com. 11 August 2011.
- "USNS T-LST-1066". NavSource. 9 September 2016.
