= PS Rising Star =

Paddle steamer warship

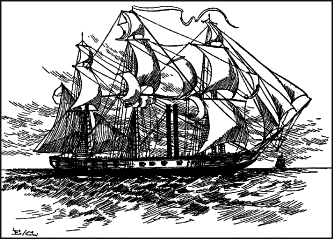
- Rising Star

History

Chile
- Name: Rising Star
- Ordered: 1817
- Builder: Blent's Yard, Rotherhithe, UK
- Cost: 7,000 pounds
- Launched: 1820
- Sponsored by: Lord Cochrane
- Completed: 1821
- Commissioned: 1822
- Decommissioned: 1824 Sold to Winter and Brittain of Buenos Aires.
- Refit: 1826 steamers were removed
- Fate: Sank 1830
- Notes: First steam warship ever built

General characteristics
- Displacement: 410 tonnes (400 long tons; 450 short tons)
- Propulsion: 70 hp (52 kW)
- Armament: 8 guns - 10 portholes for each broadside

PS Rising Star was a paddle steamer warship, nicknamed the Rising Sun. The ship was seen as a revolutionary design that included twin funnels and an internal retractable paddle wheel. She was the first ever steam warship to cross the Atlantic and the Magellan Strait from east to west in 1822. She is also listed as the first steam-powered naval vessel and as the first steam-powered vessel in the Pacific.

Rising Star was built in Rotherhithe asked for Thomas Cochrane (later tenth Earl of Dundonald) in 1817, who envisioned the military advantages that a warship of this type could offer in naval operations.

== Construction and Propulsion ==
The PS Rising Star was driven by a centerline paddle wheel powered by 70 horsepower (52 kW) steam engines consisting of twin cylinders which were constructed by Maudslay and Sons and Field.

The prospect of a ship that did not have to depend on the wind for power drew much attention and interest from Cochrane and he contributed with £3000 (15,000 pesos) of his own money into the venture. Edward Ellice, a South-America trader, supplied other £4000.

Cochrane's reputation as a skilled naval commander led him to construct a warship that aimed to eliminate the differences in capability between his new fleet and the Spanish naval forces. He made efforts to conceal the ship's real purpose under the guise that it was to be used to sail to the North Pole.

The Rising Star was inevitably a small warship, but made up for its size as with a conventional battery of twenty guns, which was distributed along its open spar deck, ten in each broadside. The paddle wheel in the central line that rotated in an hermetic interior compartment with the bottom open to the sea, protected it from attack. The engine was considered auxiliary, to have additional speed or additional capacity in case of lack of adequate wind.

PS Rising Star had not been properly designed and the engine was too small to propel her. Since the miscalculation could not be easily remedied and due to delays in her construction (which took place in Kier's yard in 1820) the Rising Star was not delivered in time and could only run her trials on the Thames in June 1821. The ship managed six knots under steam.

Although Lord Cochrane would hope to see the Rising Star completed, he had to depart to Chile, convinced by General José de San Martín to join the cause of the independence of the Hispanic-American colonies, to lead the naval campaign of the Liberating Expedition of Peru and the arrived in November 1918. When the steamboat was eventually fully finished he did not take the ship out himself; Major Hon. William Cochrane was given this task.

== The cross of the Atlantic Ocean towards Chile ==
Rising Star eventually sailed from Gravesend on 22 October 1821, heading for Valparaíso. Just off the coast of Portugal she sprang a leak and had to be put into dock at Cork for repairs to the hull. Once repaired, Rising Star set off again for Valparaíso, crossed the Atlantic, passed the Magellan Strait and this time made the voyage without interference, arriving on June 6, 1822. Its arrival was too late for the war.

Lord Cochrane resigned from his commission in Chile in November 1822, and went to the Empire of Brazil. The steamer was never used.

PS Rising Star was eventually sold to Winter y Brittain of Buenos Aires in 1824 for commercial use. His steam engine would be withdrawn and put up for sale in London in May 1826.

She sank in 1829, having run aground on the Porkkala peninsula facing the Finnish Sea, on a voyage from St. Petersburg to London.
