= Chilean schooner Colo Colo =

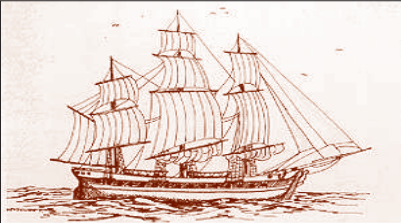
- Artistical representation of the Colo Colo

History

Chile
- Name: Colo Colo
- Namesake: Colo Colo
- Commissioned: 1830
- Decommissioned: 1841
- Fate: auctioned 1841

General characteristics
- Displacement: 140
- Crew: 80
- Armament: 1gun 18 lb and 4 guns of 1 lb

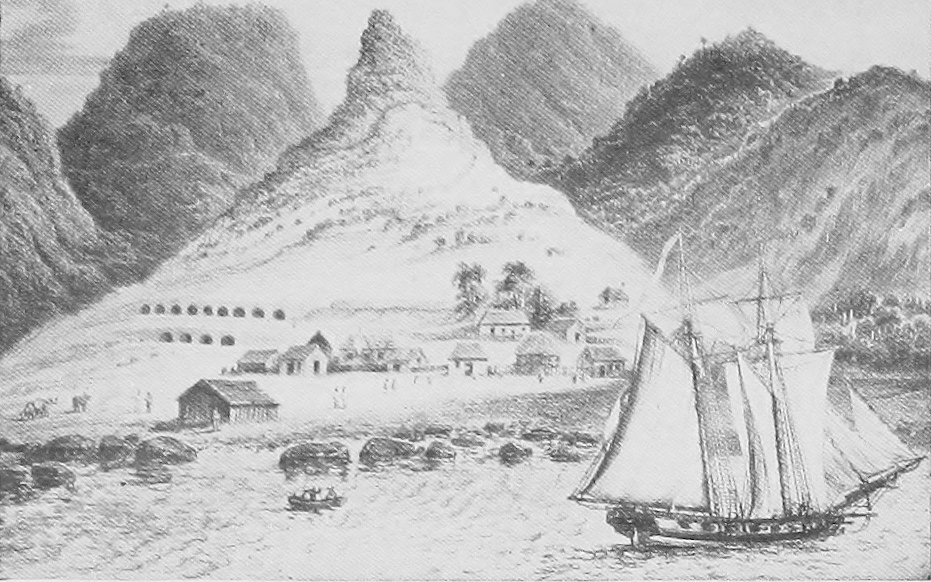
Colo Colo brought Claude Gay to the Juan Fernández Islands in 1832

At the end of the Chilean Civil War of 1829–1830 the government decided to buy the brigantine-schooner Flora to confront a new attack of insurgents. It was renamed Colo Colo.

It brought Claudio Gay to the Juan Fernández Islands and realized hydrographic survey at the coasts of Chile.

== War of the Confederation ==
In August 1836 the Chilean insurgent Ramón Freire, with the support of the government of the Peru–Bolivian Confederation, sailed bound for Chiloé to promote a revolution in Chile but he was betrayed and captured. The Chilean government sent the Colo Colo and the Aquiles under command of Pedro Angulo bound for El Callao in order to retaliate the Peruvian attempt to intervene in the Chilean affairs. The Colo Colo remained in Arica and the Aquiles continued to Lima and captured the schooner Peruviana, brigantine Arequipeño and the barque Santa Cruz in El Callao so easily and quietly that the local authorities did not realize until next morning that the Aquiles set sailed away carrying with it the Confederation's navy.

== Voyage to Easter Island and Australia in 1837 ==
On 8 March 1837, under the command of Teniente de Marina Leoncio Señoret, the Colo Colo sailed off from Valparaíso bound for Juan Fernández Islands, where she brought aboard the jailed leaders of the opposition to be banned in Australia. Thus, the Colo Colo was the first Chilean ship to program a visit the Easter Island.

On 14 November 1837, a naval Confederation force tried to liberate Ramón Freire from Juan Fernández Islands.

== See also ==
- List of decommissioned ships of the Chilean Navy
