= Chilean submarine Hyatt =

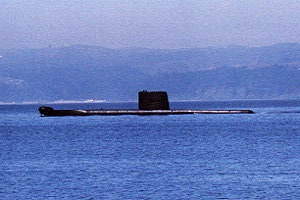
- Hyatt

History

Chile
- Name: Hyatt
- Namesake: Edward Hyatt
- Builder: Scott Lithgow
- Laid down: 10 January 1972
- Launched: 26 September 1973
- Commissioned: 27 September 1976
- Fate: Scrapped in 2003

General characteristics
- Class & type: Oberon-class submarine
- Displacement: Surface 2,030 tons, Submerged 2,410 tons
- Length: 295.2 ft (90.0 m)
- Beam: 26.5 ft (8.1 m)
- Draught: 18 ft (5.5 m)
- Propulsion: 2 × Admiralty Standard Range 16WS - ASR diesels. 3,680bhp 2 electric generators. 2560 kW. 2 electric motors. 6000shp. 2 shafts.
- Speed: Surface 12 kn (22 km/h; 14 mph), Submerged 17 kn (31 km/h; 20 mph).
- Endurance: 9,000 nmi (17,000 km; 10,000 mi) at 12 kn (22 km/h; 14 mph) surfaced.
- Complement: 65
- Sensors & processing systems: Atlas Elektronik CSU 90 suite, BAC Type 2007 flank array
- Armament: 6 21 inch (533 mm) torpedo tubes, 22 torpedoes

The Chilean submarine Hyatt (S23) was an Oberon-class submarine in the Chilean Navy, originally launched under the name Condell.

== Design and construction ==
The submarine, built by Scottish company Scott Lithgow, was laid down on 10 January 1972, and launched on 26 September 1973. The planned April 1975 completion was delayed by the need to redo internal cabling, then was pushed back further by an explosion aboard in January 1976. She was commissioned into the Chilean Navy on 27 September 1976. The submarine was named after Edward Hyatt, who died while serving aboard a Chilean warship at the Battle of Iquique, and is the second Chilean warship of the name after the 1928-launched destroyer Hyatt.

== Operational history ==
Hyatt was in service from the mid-1970s until the late 1990s.

== Decommissioning and fate ==
Hyatt and sister boat O'Brien were replaced by the Thomson-class submarines.

In 2003, Hyatt was sold, exported and scrapped at Puerto General San Martin near Pisco, Peru. This attracted some attention due to poor environmental processes during ship breaking at the site.
