= Sinking of Janequeo and Leucoton =

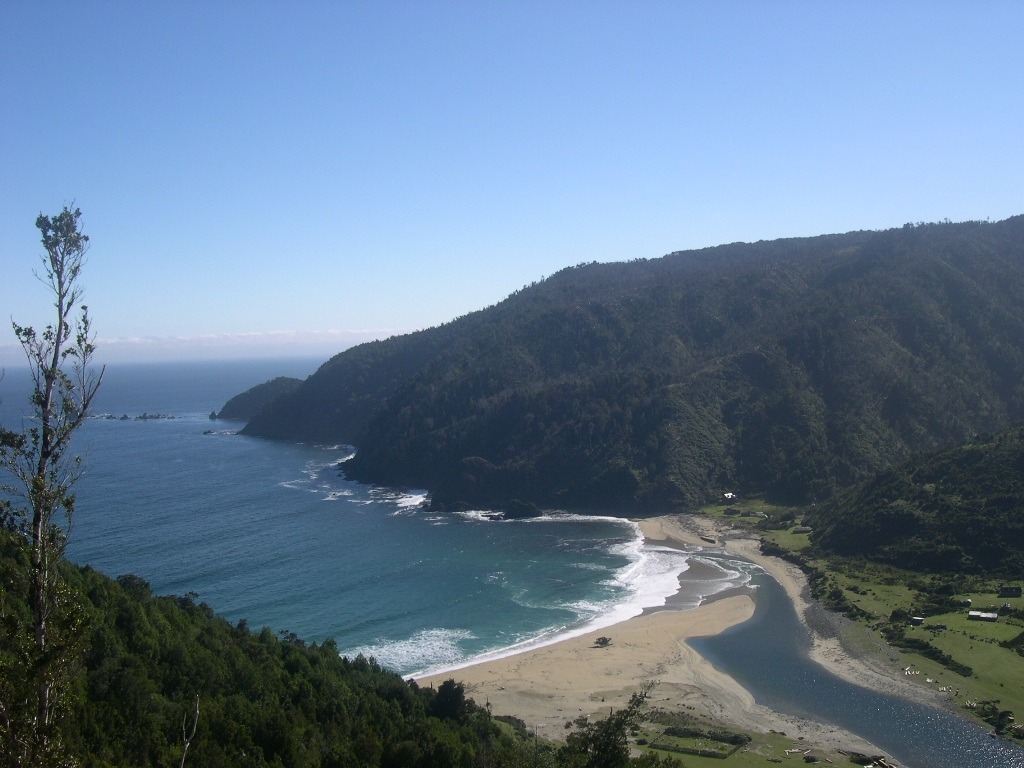
Caleta Manquemapu within the Manquemapu bay, hidden by the hill in foreground, is the wreck of Leucotón. Manquemapu River is right below of the image

On 15 October 1965 the Chilean Abnaki-class tug Janequeo sank off Caleta Llico, 60 nautical miles (110 km; 69 mi) south of Corral, Chile, with the loss of 51 men.

Leucotón under command of Pedro Fierro Herreros was ordered to the periodic maintenance of the lighthouses but on 2 August, as bad weather threatened the ship, they were forced to take refuge in Caleta Manquemapu within Bahía San Pedro. As the anchor chain broke, the ship ran aground. The naval authorities immediately sent Janequeo under the command of Marcelo Léniz Bennet, to free Leucotón. On board was a rescue team of fixed men under the command of Claudio Hemmerdinger.

The crew of Leucotón made it safely to shore but despite days of effort, she could not be freed.

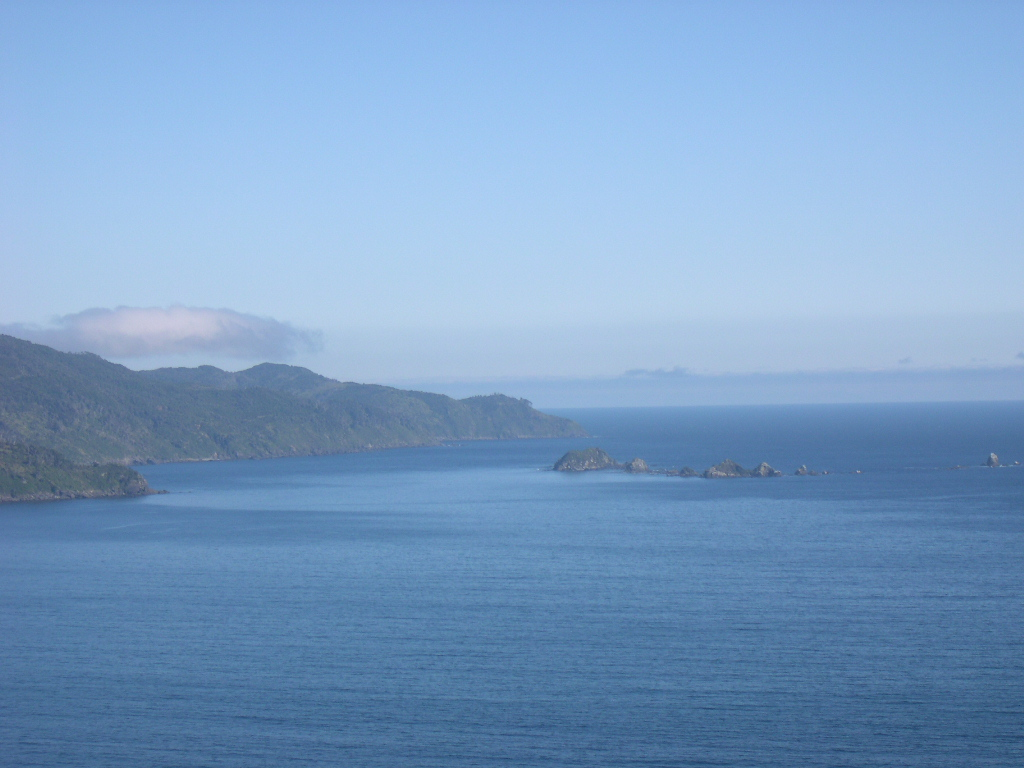
Bahía San Pedro, located at 40°53′29.24″S 73°51′1.59″W

At 16:00 on 14 August, a tow-line got entangled in the propeller of Janequeo. Despite the intensive work of Hemmerdinger's frogmen, it was not possible to free the screw. Casma and Yelcho were now ordered to the rescue, but they could not enter Manquemapu Bay, due to waves over 15 m (49 ft) high. That day Janequeo repeatedly struck the rock Campanario, and although still afloat, was partially flooded.

At 9:20 on 15 August, Janequeo broke in two. Only 28 men of the crew survived and made it safely to shore, but 51 men were lost.

== Aftermath ==
On 15 September 1965 appeared the first edition of the Chilean magazine Punto Final with an analysis of the disaster of Janequeo. Journalist Miguel Torres accused the admiralty of the Chilean Navy for the disaster.

The Leucotón shipwreck is still rusting on the beach of Manquemapu.

The patrol boat Fuentealba (15 t), the landing ship Hemmerdinger (1500 t) and patrol boat Odger (215 t) of the Chilean Navy are named after three of the sailors who died in the disaster.

== See also ==
- List of decommissioned ships of the Chilean Navy
