= Chilean torpedo boat Guacolda =

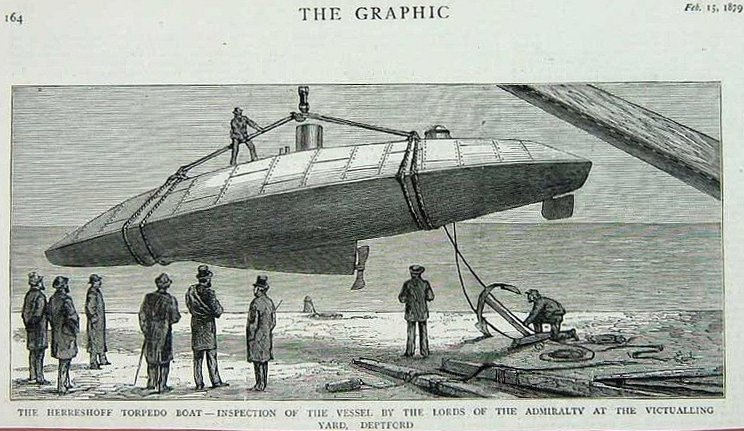
Herreshoff torpedo boat 1879, possibly the Guacolda

The Guacolda was a torpedo boat bought by Peru at the beginning of the War of the Pacific, but captured by the Chilean Navy in the Ecuadorian port of Ballenita before being commissioned.

== Construction and controversy ==
In mid-1879, when Peru was at war with Chile, Peru's Vice President José Francisco Canevaro and Captain Ruperto Alzamora bought a torpedo boat from the Herreshof shipyards in Bristol, Rhode Island at a cost of £9,000.

The ship was sent, in packaged parts, together with other war material procured in the United States in the English merchant ship Colombia, chartered by the Peruvian sailor Luis Germán Astete bound for Colón, from where it was to be transported by rail to the Pacific, assembled and sailed to Peru.

Chilean agents in the US had reported the purchases and shipments as being in violation of the neutrality laws of the US and of any port used in transit for the materials procured in the United States. For this reason, Antonio Jimenéz, Chilean consul in Panama, protested and demanded the seizure of the shipment. Panama still officially belonged to Colombia, but in practice it had its own government, whose Secretary of State, es:José María Alemán, agreed that onward shipment would not be allowed, as had been established in the Treaty of Friendship, Commerce and Navigation between the Republic of New Granada and Chile of February 16, 1844. However, there was also a more recent agreement between Panama and the United States in which Panama agreed not to interrupt the movement of goods between the two oceans. Eventually the transfer of the ship's parts was authorised by rail to Panama City on the Pacific coast on October 26, 1879.

Peruvian First Lieutenant Manuel de la Barrera was ordered to assemble the parts, name it the Alay and transfer it from Panama to Peru. After it departed on November 29, 1879, at 4 pm for Ecuador, its condenser failed at 9 pm and it had to return to Panama before leaving again on 2 December.

Meanwhile, the Chilean government, kept up to date in developments by its agents, had sent the Amazonas north to prevent the Alay from joining up with the rest of the Peruvian navy. The Amazonas, commanded by Manuel Thomson, reached Paita on December 17 hunting for the Peruvian torpedo boat. After inspecting the boats in the bay, it continued its search further north.

== Capture ==
The Alay sailed for Manta, Ecuador, but on the way it ran out of coal and had to burn firewood. On December 13, 1879, the two engineers abandoned it and went aboard the steamer Casma, while an engineer from the Casma, Juan Cabello, voluntarily took over the ship. The Alay arrived in Manta, where it was supplied with coal and food. On December 15 at 7 pm the Peruvian officers, First Lieutenant de la Barrera and the Frigate Lieutenant Vidal, were prevented from re-embarking by around thirty Ecuadorians, who surrounded the ship. De la Barrera and Vidal traveled to Guayaquil and when they did not find the boat, assumed it had already gone to Paita. On December 24, they arrived in Paita and a few hours later, the Amazonas entered the bay towing the Alay. The Amazonas had captured the Alay the previous day in the Ecuadorian port of Ballenita with only 3 sailors on board, as the others had fled.

Due to the loss of the ship, Manuel de la Barrera was dismissed, stripped of his rank and declared unfit for any military position in November 1880. The government of Ecuador protested against the Chilean incursion into its waters, but to no effect.

== Service history ==
The ship was undergoing repairs in Chile until March 1880, when it was renamed the Guacolda. It was placed under the command of First Lieutenant Luis A. Goñi and first saw service in the flotilla of the Blockade of Callao, which began with an attempt to torpedo the Peruvian corvette Unión on April 10, 1880. The Guacolda sank in late March 1881 off the coast of Chincha.

== See also ==
Torpedo boats in the War of the Pacific
