= Torpedo boats in the War of the Pacific =

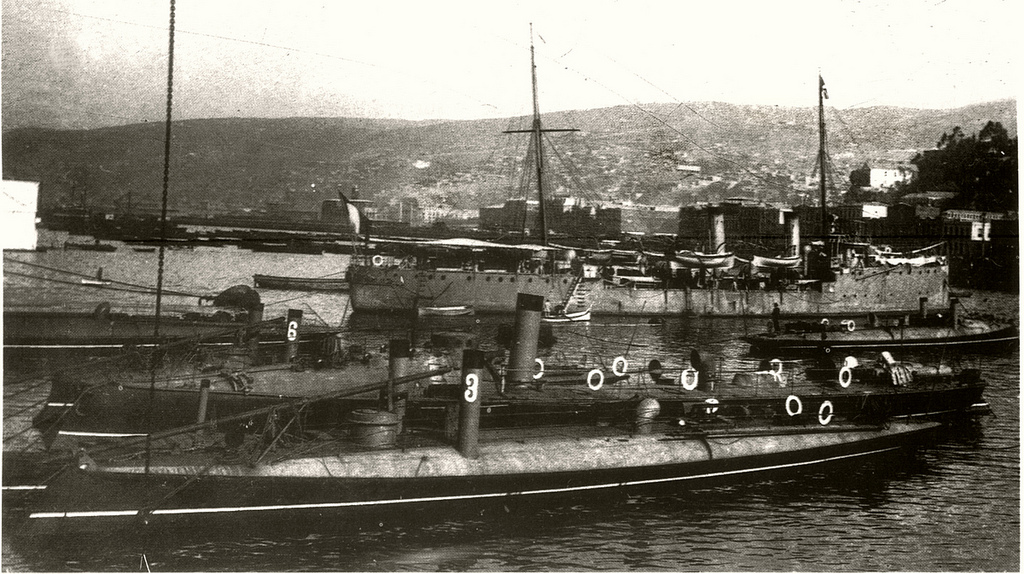
Chilean torpedo boats in Valparaíso

The introduction of fast torpedo boats in the late 19th century was a serious concern to navies of an era that saw a number of innovations in naval warfare, including the first torpedo boats, which carried spar torpedoes, steam propulsion and steel ships.

Clements Robert Markham, later president of the Royal Geographical Society, an English eyewitness of the War of the Pacific stated:

The value of fast torpedo boats in maintaining a blockade cannot be over-estimated. They are not only the "eyes" but the "legs" of a squadron. Not only are they of use in preventing the escape of any of the enemy's ships, but they also afford protection to their own fleet, giving timely notice of approaching danger at night by a prearranged system of flashing lights, and in the daytime by their great speed. The thoroughness of the blockade of Callao was undoubtedly due, in a great measure, to the Chilean torpedo boats.

== Chilean torpedo boats ==
With the exception of Vedette, all boat names are of Mapudungun provenance.

=== Torpedo boat Vedette ===
Vedette was built in Yarrow of Poplar (Yard nr. 495) and arrived in Valparaíso on 17 October 1879 on board Belle of Cork. She was assembled in Valparaíso and in 1893 she was still listed by the navy. The name seems to be the name of the boat class rather than the proper name of a boat.

- Displacement: 10 t
- Power:
- Ship armament: 2 × Spar torpedo
- Length:
- Speed: 16.5 kn

=== Torpedo boats built 1880 ===
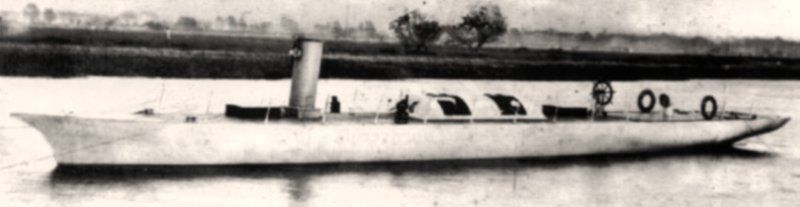
Torpedo boat Colo Colo on the Thames River during the Sea trial

Yet 1880 were delivered to Chile two torpedo boats bought from Yarrow of Poplar shipyard., Colo Colo (Yard nr. 476) and Tucapel (Yard nr. 475):

- Displacement: 5 t / 30 t
- Length: 14.63 m
- Beam: 2.44 m
- Power: 60 HP
- Speed: 12.5 kn
- Ship armament: 2 × Spar torpedo + 2 x Hotchkiss machine gun

They could be stowed in the major ships of the navy and Colo Colo was brought by railway to Puno and then to the Titicaca Lake (elevation of 3,812 metres (12,507 ft)) in order to impede guerrilla activities in the zone.

=== Torpedo boats built 1880–82 ===
During the War of the Pacific the Chilean Navy bought ten torpedo boats from the Yarrow of Poplar shipyard.

- Displacement: 25–30 tons
- Power: 400 HP
- Ship armament: 2 × Spar torpedo + 1 x Hotchkiss machine gun
- Length: 26–30 m
- Speed: 19 kn (35 km/h)

Torpedo boats built 1880–1882
Boat name	Yard number	Marine nummer	
Janequeo (2°)	452		Sunk off Callao on 25 May 1880
Fresia		1	Sunk off El Callao on 6 Dec. 1880. Refloated. Stripped 1884.
Fresia (2°)			
Guacolda		4	
Lauca	528	5	
Glaura		6	Sold to Japan 1885 for £10,000
Tegualda		7	
Janequeo (3°)	524	8	Stripped after the Civil War of 1891
Guale	509	9	
Quidora		10	
Rucumilla	508	11	Descomm. 1902

== Peruvian torpedo boats ==
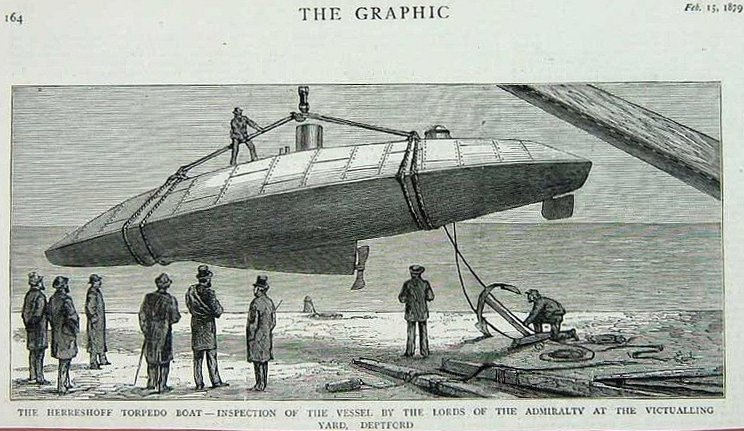
A Herreshoff torpedo boat in 1879

1879 the Peruvian Government bought three torpedo boats: Alianza and República from the Herreshoff Manufacturing Company, Bristol, Rhode Island, United States, although R. V. Simpson states that the third boat was never delivered to Perú.There is some confusion regarding the third Herreshoff launch; the truth is that it never actually left the premises—a member of the family has stated that it remained in storage on their family farm for several years. Therefore, it could be said that the *Alay* actually comes from a different shipyard: Thornycroft, an English shipyard located in England.

República and Alianza arrived in Perú in August and September 1879. Both boats were scuttled Alianza aftermath the Battle of Arica in June 1880 and República in January 1881 in the Blockade of Callao, to prevent their capture by the Chilean forces.

Alay was secretly transported by ship to Colon, Panama in the Caribbean Sea. From Colon she was transported by rail to Panama City, on the Pacific Ocean. On 2 December Alay sailed, bound for Perú but on 24 December 1879, the Chilean gunned transport Amazonas captured the boat in the Ecuadorian port Ballenita. In Chile she was renamed Guacolda and commissioned into the Chilean navy and fought in the Blockade of Callao between April of 1880 and January of 1881. It sank on April 4, 1881 while being towed off Chincha Islands

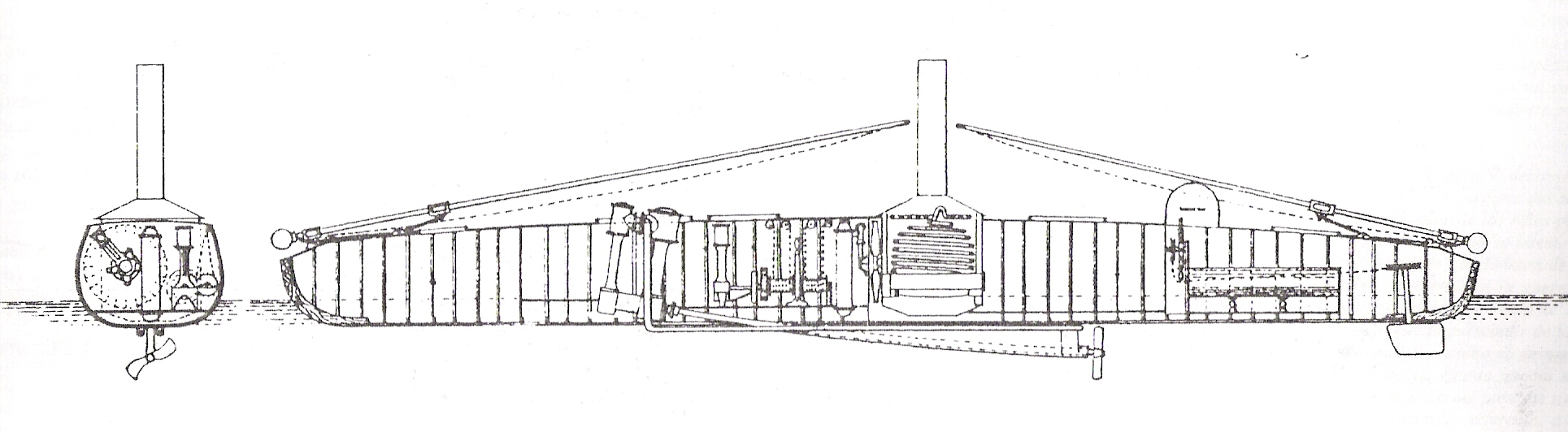

- Displacement: 6 t
- Power: 1 máquina a vapor alternativa de dos cilindros
- Ship armament: 2 Spar torpedo + 1 x Hotchkiss 37 mm machine gun
- Length: 18 metres (59 ft)
- Speed: 16.5 kn (30.6 km/h)

== See also ==
- List of decommissioned ships of the Chilean Navy

== Sources ==
- Germán Bravo Valdivieso (28 March 2006), Buques de la Armada construidos en Chile (PDF) (in Spanish), archived from the original (PDF) on 2011-08-19
- Scientific American (February 12, 1881), Herreshoff Manufacturing Company in the 1800s, Scientific American, archived from the original on 25 March 2012
- Thomas Cavieres, Federico (1989). "Torpederas de vapor de la Armada de Chile" (PDF). Revista de Marina (in Spanish). 106 (791). Viña del Mar, Chile.
- Gardiner, Robert, ed. (1979). Conway's All the World's Fighting Ships 1860–1905. London, UK: Conway Maritime Press. ISBN 0-85177-133-5.
