= Chilean brigantine Aquiles =

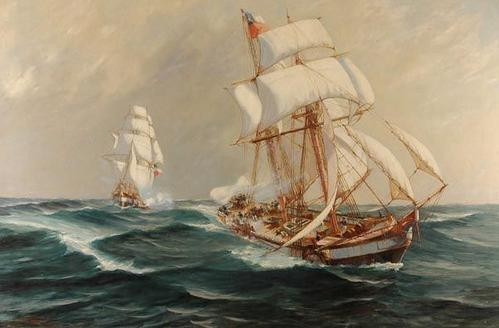
- Peruviana under the Flag of Chile after her capture by the Aquiles

History

Spain
- Name: Aquiles
- Fate: Mutiny in Guam, handed over to Chile in 1825

Chile
- Name: Aquiles
- Namesake: Achilles
- Commissioned: 1825
- Honours and awards: Capture of 3 Peruvian ships in Callao
- Fate: Sunk off Valparaíso 1839

General characteristics
- Displacement: 405
- Armament: 20 × 12-pounder guns

Aquiles was a brigantine, originally Spanish, that later served in the Chilean Navy. Sunk off Valparaíso on 24 July 1839.

== Spanish career ==
Aquiles was a Spanish brigantine of unknown builder that sailed on 13 January 1824 from Cádiz and arrived to Callao on 12 September 1824 to support the Spanish troops in America. After the defeat of the Battle of Ayacucho, the Asia, Aquiles, brigantine Constante and the merchant ship Clarington sailed on 2 January 1825 from Quilca to Manila in the Philippines.

On 10 March 1825 the crew of the ship Asia mutinied in Guam, captured the Brigantine Constante, burnt the frigate Clarington, sailed to Acapulco and handed both ships to the new Mexican authorities.

On 14 March 1825 the crew of Aquiles mutinied as well, and under the command of Capitán de Fragata Pedro Angulo Novoa sailed to Santa Barbara, California where they arrived on 29 April. On 23 June 1825 the Aquiles arrived to Valparaíso and the ship was handed over to the authorities.

== Chilean career ==
After the termination of the First Chilean Navy Squadron by a decree of Ramón Freire on 2 April 1826, Aquiles was for a long time the only ship of the Chilean Navy. 1828, under the command of Captain Charles Whiting Wooster she sailed for Juan Fernández Islands in search of pirates.

During the Chilean Civil War of 1829–1830 she was captured by insurgents and fought with HMS Thetis, under command of Captain Bingham, surrendered and was handed over to the Chilean government.

Under the command of captain Robert Winthrop Simpson, she began the tradition of charting and bathymetric surveys of the Chilean coast with the first hydrographic survey around 40°S that culminated with the Naval Hydrographic Institute in 1875.

=== War of the Confederation ===
On 21 August 1836 Aquiles captured the Peruvian ships Santa Cruz, Arequipeño and Peruviana in Callao.

On 30 October the Chilean ships Aquiles, Colo Colo, frigate Valparaíso, frigate Monteagudo and brigantine Orbegoso under the command of Mariano Egaña arrived to Callao to negotiate the Chilean conditions for a peace with the Confederation, but he failed and on 28 December 1836 Chile declared war on the confederation.

On 5 February 1837 she fought against the Peruvian schooner Yanacocha off the San Lorenzo Island.

She was driven ashore and wrecked at Callao, Peru on 24 July 1839.

== See also ==
- First Chilean Navy Squadron
- List of decommissioned ships of the Chilean Navy
