= Chilean tugboat Janequeo =

Coordinates: 40°53′29.24″S 73°51′1.59″W

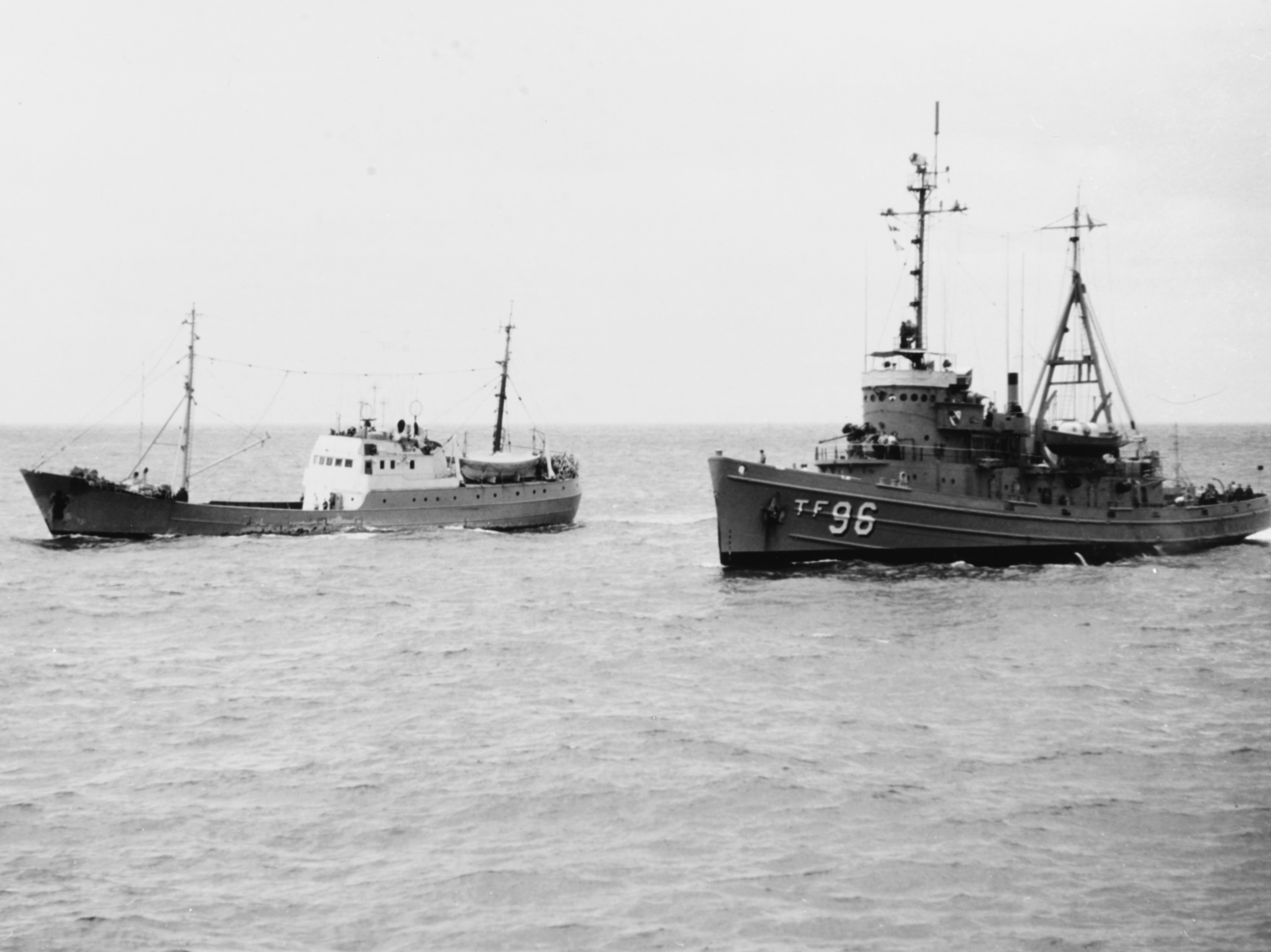
- Sister ship USS Abnaki (right), alongside a Soviet trawler

History

United States
- Name: Potawatomi
- Laid down: 19 October 1942
- Launched: 3 April 1943
- Commissioned: 12 February 1944
- Decommissioned: 28 April 1948
- Reclassified: Fleet Ocean Tug (ATF-109), 15 May 1944
- Fate: Sold to Chile

Chile
- Name: Janequeo
- Commissioned: February 1963
- Fate: Sunk in Caleta Manquemapu, 60 nmi (110 km; 69 mi) south of Corral, Chile, with loss of 51 men

General characteristics
- Class & type: Abnaki-class tug
- Displacement: 1,240 t.(lt) 1,675 t.(fl)
- Length: 205 ft (62 m)
- Beam: 38 ft 6 in (11.73 m)
- Draft: 15 ft 4 in (4.67 m)
- Propulsion: Diesel-electric 4 × 750 hp (560 kW) Busch-Sulzer BS-539 diesel main engines driving four General Electric main drive generators and two 1,500 hp (1,100 kW) pulsation motors three diesel-drive General Motors 3-268A auxiliary services engines driving three ship's service generators two 200 kW 120 V/240 V DC one 100 kW 120 V/240 V DC single propeller, 3,000 shp (2,200 kW)
- Speed: 16.5 knots (30.6 km/h; 19.0 mph)
- Complement: 85
- Armament: 1 × single 3 in (76 mm) cal. dual-purpose gun mount; 2 × single 40 mm AA gun mounts; 2 × single 20 mm AA gun mounts

The Chilean tugboat Janequeo (ATF-65) was an Abnaki-class tug of the Chilean Navy, formerly the USS Potawatomi (ATF-109).

Potawatomi was damaged by the November 1944 USS Mount Hood (AE-11) explosion.

Janequeo sank on 15 August 1965 during a devastating storm in the Bay of Manquemapu, 60 nautical miles (110 km; 69 mi) south of Corral, Chile with the loss of 51 men as she helped Leucotón that had run aground.

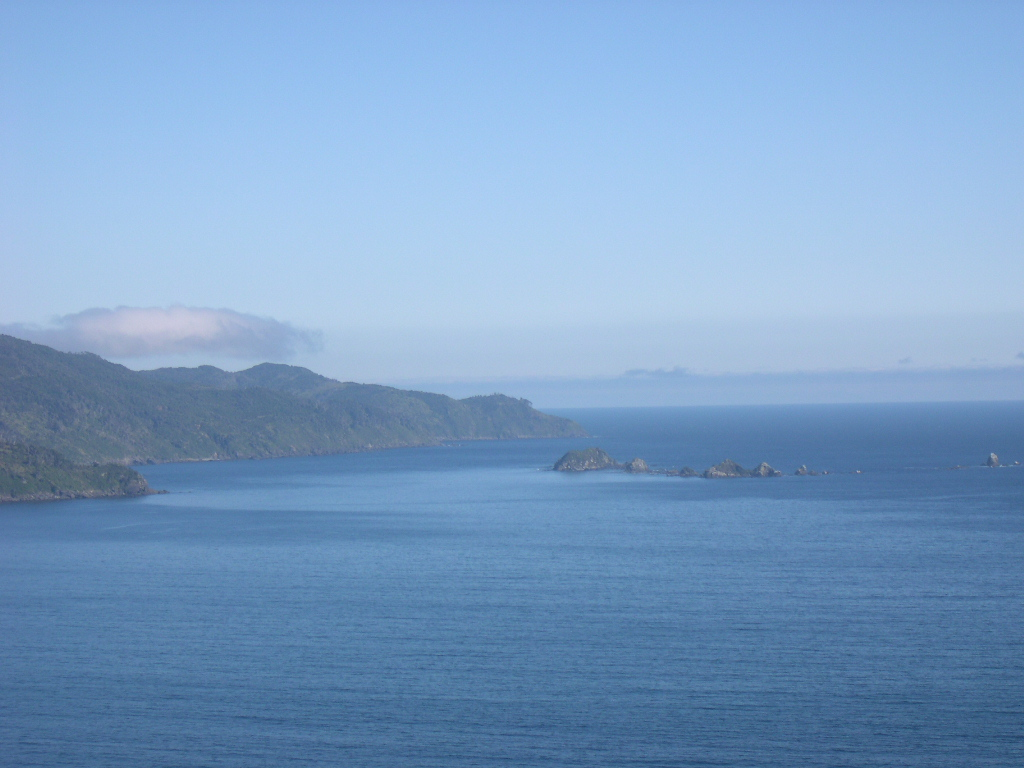
Bahía San Pedro, located at

== See also ==
- Sinking of Janequeo and Leucotón
