= List of shipwrecks in January 1881 =

The list of shipwrecks in January 1881 includes ships sunk, foundered, grounded, or otherwise lost during January 1881.

== 1 January ==
List of shipwrecks: 1 January 1881
Ship	State	Description
Baltic	United Kingdom	The ship ran aground at New York, United States. She was on a voyage from Liverpool, Lancashire to New York. She was refloated and taken in to New York.
Chingtoo	United Kingdom	The ship was driven ashore and wrecked at Takao, Formosa.
Edith Godden	United States	The steamship ran aground at New York. She was on a voyage from New York to Montego Bay, Jamaica. She was refloated and resumed her voyage.
Freigheit	Germany	The ship ran aground. She was on a voyage from New York to Bremen. She was refloated.
George B. McClellan	United States	The tug exploded. Her smokestack fell on the master of the barge she was towing, killing him.
Idaho	United States	The ship was driven ashore at Smith Point, Fire Island, New York. She was on a voyage from Cienfuegos, Cuba to New York City.
Paulina	Flag unknown	The ship was driven ashore at "Upper Middle". she was on a voyage from New York to Amsterdam, North Holland, Netherlands.
Queen of the Sea	United Kingdom	The ship was abandoned in the Atlantic Ocean. Her crew were rescued by Flying Cloud (United States). Queen of the Sea was on a voyage from New York to Plymouth, Devon.
Saint Jean	France	The barque collided with the barque Privateer (United Kingdom) and sank off the Isles of Scilly, United Kingdom with the loss of three of her crew. Saint Jean was on a voyage from Liverpool to Bordeaux, Gironde.
Thistle	United Kingdom	The schooner collided with the steamship Dafmer (Denmark) at Vlissingen, Zeeland, Netherlands and was severely damaged. Thistle was on a voyage from Antwerp, Belgium to Newcastle upon Tyne, Northumberland.

== 2 January ==
List of shipwrecks: 2 January 1881
Ship	State	Description
Maria Sarah	Germany	The barque was wrecked on the Fair Prospect Rock, 12 nautical miles (22 km) off Port Antonio, Jamaica. Her crew were rescued. She was on a voyage from Brazil to Pensacola, Florida, United States.
Unnamed	Flag unknown	The schooner collided with the barque Alexandra (United Kingdom) and foundered off Cape St. Vincent, Portugal with the loss of all hands.

== 3 January ==
List of shipwrecks: 3 January 1881
Ship	State	Description
Farnley	United Kingdom	The steamship was wrecked at Lemvig, Denmark with the loss of all 28 crew. She was on a voyage from Savannah, Georgia, United States to Reval, Russia.
Happy Home	Canada	The barque ran aground on the Trinity Ledge, in the Bay of Fundy, and capsized with the loss of three lives. She was on a voyage from Hamburg, Germany to Saint John, New Brunswick.
Hermann Johannes	Netherlands	The galiot was driven ashore on Borkum, Germany. She was on a voyage from Riga, Russia to Delfzijl, Groningen. She was declared a total loss, but was subsequently refloated and towed in to Geestemünde, Germany.
James Shaw	United Kingdom	The ship was driven ashore at the mouth of the River Tees. She was on a voyage from Dieppe, Seine-Inférieure, France to Middlesbrough, Yorkshire.
Lupata	United Kingdom	The ship sank about 200 yards (180 m) from the Tillamook Rock Lighthouse, off Oregon Coast, United States with the loss of all 30 crew. She was on a voyage from Japan to a port in Oregon, United States.
Volga	Flag unknown	The steamship was wrecked on rocks 6 nautical miles (11 km) south of the entrance to the "Narowsund".

== 4 January ==
List of shipwrecks: 4 January 1881
Ship	State	Description
Active	United Kingdom	The steamship struck the Stag Rocks, off Lizard Point, Cornwall and sank. Her ten crew were rescued by a fishing lugger. She was on a voyage from Neath, Glamorgan to Caen, Calvados, France.
Brazilian	United Kingdom	The steamship ran aground on the Burbo Bank, in Liverpool Bay and broke in two. Her crew were rescued. She was on a voyage from Boston, Massachusetts, United States to Liverpool, Lancashire.
Caterina Olivari	Italy	The brig ran aground in the Dardanelles at "Doganaslan".
Hispania	United Kingdom	The steamship ran aground on the Burbo Bank. She was on a voyage from Bombay, India to Liverpool. She was refloated with assistance from the tug Royal Alfred (United Kingdom) and taken in to Liverpool.
Magdalene	United Kingdom	The fishing boat ran aground on the Annat Bank, at the mouth of the River Tay and sank. Her six crew were rescued by Star of Peace (United Kingdom).
Persia	Italy	The steamship ran aground on the Meloria Bank, off Livorno. She was refloated.
Rosita	Spain	The schooner was wrecked on the Halliday Flats, in the North Sea off the coast of Essex. She was abandoned by all but her captain. She was on a voyage from Hamburg, Germany to Puerto Rica.
Star of Peace	United Kingdom	The fishing boat ran aground on the Annat Bank. All twelve people on board were rescued by the Montrose Lifeboat Mincing Lane ( Royal National Lifeboat Institution). Star of Peace was subsequently refloated and towed in to Montrose, Forfarshire by the tug Storm King (United Kingdom).

== 5 January ==
List of shipwrecks: 5 January 1881
Ship	State	Description
Adam White	United Kingdom	The schooner was driven ashore in Pegwell Bay. She was on a voyage from Antwerp, Belgium to Gijón, Spain. She was refloated and taken in to Ramsgate, Kent in a severely leaky condition.
Chingtoo	United Kingdom	The ship was wrecked at Takow, Formosa.
Genova	United Kingdom	The steamship ran aground in the River Tees. She was on a voyage from Calais, France to Middlesbrough, Yorkshire. She was refloated and taken in to Middlesbrough.
Indian Chief	United Kingdom	The full-rigged ship was wrecked on the Long Sand, in the North Sea off the coast of Essex with the loss of seventeen of her 28 crew. Survivors were rescued by the Ramsgate Lifeboat Bradford ( Royal National Lifeboat Institution). Indian Chief was on a voyage from Middlesbrough to Yokohama, Japan.
John Zittlosen	United States	The barque collided with the steamship Idlewild (United Kingdom) and sank in the English Channel 4 nautical miles (7.4 km) south east of Folkestone, Kent with the loss of five of the fifteen people on board. John Zittlosen was on a voyage from Hamburg, Germany to New York, United States. The investigation held the Idlewild's master and first officer to blame.
Meredith	United Kingdom	The steamship was driven ashore at Point Law, Aberdeenshire. She was refloated with assistance from the tug Britannia (United Kingdom) and taken in to Aberdeen.
Nymphoea	United Kingdom	The steamship ran aground on the Sunk Sand, in the North Sea off the coast of Essex. Her crew took to the lifeboats and were rescued by another steamship. Nymphoea was on a voyage from the River Tyne to Athens, Greece.
Sarah	Norway	The schooner may have run aground on the Gunfleet Sand, in the North Sea off the coast of Essex. She was subsequently assisted in to the River Colne.

== 6 January ==
List of shipwrecks: 6 January 1881
Ship	State	Description
Ada and Emma	Germany	The steamship was destroyed by fire at Cardiff, Glamorgan, United Kingdom.
Alert	United Kingdom	The ship was wrecked at Cley-next-the-Sea, Norfolk. Her crew were rescued by the Sheringham Lifeboat. She was on a voyage from Sunderland, County Durham to Dartmouth, Devon.
Anson Stimson	United States	The schooner was wrecked on Brigantine Shoal bar, New Jersey. The wreck was probably caused by the death of the captain earlier and six crew were ill leaving only the mate and cook to sail the ship.
Catherine Richards	United Kingdom	The schooner was driven ashore at Kildonan Point, Isle of Skye. Her crew were rescued. She was on a voyage from Algiers, Algeria to Glasgow, Renfrewshire.
Harelda, and Léon	United Kingdom; Spain	The steamship Harelda collided with the steamship Léon and sank off Cabo da Roca, Portugal. Her 22 crew got aboard Léon, which also sank. All on board took to boats. Nine crew from Harelda and fifteen from Léon reached Lisbon. Twenty crewmen from Harelda and Léon were rescued by the steamship Liddesdale (United Kingdom). A number of survivors were rescued by the steamship Irene Morris (United Kingdom). Harelda was on a voyage from Palermo, Sicily, Italy to London. Léon was on a voyage from Liverpool, Lancashire, United Kingdom to Manila, Spanish East Indies.
Macbeth	United Kingdom	The full-rigged ship was driven ashore on the coast of Lincolnshire. She was being towed from London to the River Tyne by the tug Black Prince (United Kingdom). Macbeth was refloated and towed in to South Shields, County Durham.
Sarah and Emma	Germany	The full-rigged ship caught fire at Cardiff and was scuttled.
Terrible	United Kingdom	The fishing trawler caught fire and sank at Scarborough, Yorkshire.
Unnamed	Flag unknown	A large steamship ran aground on the Goodwin Sands, Kent and sank with the loss of all hands.

== 7 January ==
List of shipwrecks: 7 January 1881
Ship	State	Description
Allianca	Portugal	The schooner was run ashore on Madeira.
America	France	The steamship was driven ashore 2 nautical miles (3.7 km) from Barletta, Kingdom of Italy. Five of her crew abandoned her; the rest refused to. America was on a voyage from Barletta to Brindisi, Italy.
Eugenie	France	The ship ran aground and sank at the "Île du Lin". She was on a voyage from Newport, Monmouthshire, United Kingdom to Nantes, Loire-Inférieure.
Norma	Sweden	The barque departed from Howdon, Northumberland, United Kingdom for Holmstadt. No further trace, presumed foundered with the loss of all hands.
Reine des Fleurs	France	The ship was driven ashore at Calais. She was on a voyage from Danzig, Germany to Calais.
Rosalind	United Kingdom	The ship ran aground east of Dunnose, Isle of Wight. She was on a voyage from Middlesbrough, Yorkshire to Bilbao, Spain.
Seagull	Norway	The barque was driven ashore and wrecked at Dungeness, Kent. Her crew were rescued by the Coastguard using rocket apparatus.
Scotia	United Kingdom	The steamship was driven ashore on Sanda Island. She was on a voyage from Boston, Massachusetts, United States to the Clyde. She was refloated and taken in to the Clyde.
Unnamed	United Kingdom	The pilot boat was lost at Wicklow with the loss of all four people on board.

== 8 January ==
List of shipwrecks: 8 January 1881
Ship	State	Description
Isaac and Isabella	United Kingdom	The ship ran aground at Whitby, Yorkshire. She was refloated and taken in to Whitby, where she sank.
Mulgrave	United Kingdom	The ship ran aground at Collier Hope, Yorkshire.
Penope	United Kingdom	The Thames barge was run into by the steamship Capella (Germany) in the River Thames. She was beached at Shadwell, Middlesex, where she sank.
Vincenzo	Flag unknown	The ship was driven ashore in the Dardanelles. She was on a voyage from Glasgow, Renfrewshire, United Kingdom to Odesa, Russia.

== 9 January ==
List of shipwrecks: 9 January 1881
Ship	State	Description
Chimborazo	United Kingdom	The steamship was driven ashore in the Gulf of Saint Vincent. Her passengers were taken off. She was refloated and resumed her voyage.
Excel	United States	The schooner was abandoned in the Atlantic Ocean. All on board were rescued by the steamship Cyphrenes (United Kingdom). Excel was on a voyage from Nassau, Bahamas to Norfolk, Virginia.
Forest Eagle	United States	The ship foundered in the Atlantic Ocean. Her crew were rescued by the barque Leif Erickson (Norway) and the steamship Trogan (United Kingdom). Forest Eagle was on a voyage from Bremen, Germany to New Orleans, Louisiana.
Foxhound	United Kingdom	The fishing smack was sighted in the North Sea. No further trace, presumed foundered with the loss of all five crew.
R. B.	United Kingdom	The schooner collided with Elfin and sank off the Longships, Cornwall. Her crew were rescued by Elfin. R. B. was on a voyage from Neath, Glamorgan to Marans, Charente-Inférieure, France.

== 10 January ==
List of shipwrecks: 10 January 1881
Ship	State	Description
Altofts	United Kingdom	The steamship ran aground at Donna Nook, Lincolnshire. She was refloated and taken in to the Humber.
Despatch	United Kingdom	The ship ran aground at Cape Gutta, Cyprus and was damaged. She was taken in to Limassol in a disabled condition.
Eliza Boustead	United Kingdom	The ship collided with HMS Defiance (Royal Navy) and sank in the River Mersey. Her crew were rescued. She was on a voyage from Saint-Valery-sur-Somme, Somme, France to Runcorn, Cheshire.
Highbury	United Kingdom	The steamship ran aground in the Schuylkill River. She was on a voyage from Philadelphia, Pennsylvania, United States to Antwerp, Belgium.
Highflyer	United States	The fishing schooner was wrecked at Carver's Harbor, Fox Island Main, Nova Scotia Canada. Her crew were rescued.
Mount Hermon	United Kingdom	The steamship ran aground at Genoa, Italy and was severely damaged. Her crew survived. She was on her maiden voyage, from Glasgow, Renfrewshire to Genoa. She sank on 16 January.
Primrose	United Kingdom	The fishing smack was driven ashore at Blakeney, Norfolk.
Prinz Friedrich Karl	Germany	The steamship was driven ashore at Baltic Port, Russia. She was on a voyage from New Orleans to Reval, Russia. She was refloated in late January.
Urbanitet	Norway	The ketch ran aground at Scarborough, Yorkshire, United Kingdom. She was on a voyage from Hamburg, Germany to Middlesbrough, Yorkshire. She capsized and sank the next day.

== 11 January ==
List of shipwrecks: 11 January 1881
Ship	State	Description
Bella Gaditana	Sweden	The barque was abandoned in the Atlantic Ocean. Her crew were rescued by Abercarne (United Kingdom). Bella Gaditana was on a voyage from Liverpool, Lancashire, United Kingdom to Pensacola, Florida, United States.
Hereford	South Australia	The full-rigged ship ran aground at Point Lonsdale, Victoria. She was on a voyage from London to Melbourne, Victoria. She was later salvaged and repaired.
Jessie	United Kingdom	The fishing trawler was abandoned 4 nautical miles (7.4 km) east of the Carr Rock. Her five crew were rescued by the tug Asia (United Kingdom). Jessie drove ashore at St. Abb's Head, Berwickshire and was wrecked.
Nettlesworth	United Kingdom	The steamship ran aground on the Shipwash Sand, in the North Sea off the coast of Suffolk. She was on a voyage from Riga, Russia to Dunkirk, Nord, France. She was refloated with the assistance of two smacks and taken in to Harwich, Essex
Scottish Chief	United Kingdom	The fishing trawler was lost at Aberdeen with the loss of all three crew.
Star of the East	United Kingdom	The barque capsized at Cardiff, Glamorgan.
Unnamed	United Kingdom	The fishing vessel was wrecked at Eyemouth, Berwickshire.
Unnamed	United Kingdom	The fishing trawler was driven ashore and wrecked at Skateraw, Kincardineshire with the loss of all hands.
Unnamed	United Kingdom	The fishing boat was wrecked north of Clyth, Caithness with the loss of all six crew.
Unnamed	United Kingdom	The fishing boat was wrecked at Dunbeath, Caithness with the loss of all five crew.

== 12 January ==
List of shipwrecks: 12 January 1881
Ship	State	Description
Arab	United Kingdom	The schooner was driven ashore at Flimby, Cumberland.
Emma Francis	Canada	The barque foundered in the Atlantic Ocean (43°56′N 32°22′W). Her thirteen crew were rescued by the barque Wilhelm Foss (Norway). Emma Francis was on a voyage from Antwerp, Belgium to Veracruz, Mexico.
Nellie Murphy	United Kingdom	The full-rigged ship was driven ashore at Cape Henry, Virginia. She was on a voyage from Tusket, Nova Scotia, Canada to Norfolk, Virginia.
Rosa Mary	United Kingdom	The steamship ran aground at Billingham, Yorkshire. She was on a voyage from Alexandria, Egypt to Middlesbrough, Yorkshire. She was refloated and taken in to Stockton-on-Tees, County Durham.
Toyokuni Maru	Japan	The steamship was destroyed by fire in the Inland Sea of Japan with the loss of 66 of the 80 people on board. Survivors were rescued by the steamship Tokio Maru (Japan). Toyokuni Maru was on a voyage from Osaka to Shimonoseki.
West Stanley	United Kingdom	The steamship ran aground on the Filsand Reef, off Kuressaare, Russia. Her crew survived. She was on a voyage from Galveston, Texas, United States to Reval, Russia.

== 13 January ==
List of shipwrecks: 13 January 1881
Ship	State	Description
Arab	United Kingdom	The schooner was driven ashore at Flimby, Cumberland. She was on a voyage from Belfast, County Antrim to Maryport, Cumberland.
Foxhound	United Kingdom	The smack was run down and sunk in the Dogger Bank by the steamship Prinz Wilhelm (Germany). Her crew were rescued.
Unnamed	(Ottoman Empire) Egypt	The lighter sank at Alexandria.

== 14 January ==
List of shipwrecks: 14 January 1881
Ship	State	Description
Ardeer	United Kingdom	The steamship collided with the steamship Hirondelle (France) and sank at Ouistreham, Calvados, France. Her crew were rescued.
Blyth	United Kingdom	The steamship was wrecked at Santoña, Spain. She was on a voyage from Cape San Antonio, Spain to a British port.
Cecelia	Flag unknown	The ship ran aground in Sandown Bay. She was on a voyage from Palma de Mallorca, Spain to Hamburg, Germany. She was refloated and put in to Cowes, Isle of Wight, United Kingdom.
Chevington	United Kingdom	The steamship collided with the steamship Alster (United Kingdom) and sank in the River Thames at Wapping, Middlesex. Her crew were rescued. Chevington was refloated on 17 January and beached.
Emily	United Kingdom	The fishing trawler was run down by the barque Talisman (Italy) approximately 20 nautical miles (37 km) off the Eddystone Rocks, Cornwall. A nearby fishing boat rescued her four crew.
Manitoban	United Kingdom	The steamship ran aground in the Clyde near Bowling, Dunbartonshire. She was on a voyage from Boston, Massachusetts, United States to Glasgow, Renfrewshire.
Jeanette	Netherlands	The ship ran aground. She was on a voyage from Reval, Russia to Leith, Lothian, United Kingdom. She was refloated and taken in to Gothenburg, Sweden in a leaky condition.
Lenore	United Kingdom	The full-rigged ship was run into by the steamship John Dixon (United Kingdom) and sank in the North Sea off the coast of County Durham with the loss of eight of the 22 people on board. Lenore was on a voyage from the River Tyne to Bombay, India.
Minnie Coles	United Kingdom	The schooner ran aground on the Goodwin Sands, Kent. She was on a voyage from London to Belfast, County Antrim. She was refloated and assisted in to Ramsgate, Kent by the tug Vulcan (United Kingdom) and the Ramsgate Lifeboat Bradford ( Royal National Lifeboat Institution).
Saint-Germain	France	The steamship ran aground at Point-à-Pitre, Guadeloupe. Her passengers were taken off. She was on a voyage from Colón, United States of Colombia to Saint-Nazaire, Loire-Inférieure. She was refloated and taken in to Fort-de-France, Martinique.
Sverre	Norway	The steamship was driven ashore 1 1/2 nautical miles (2.8 km) south of Newton-by-the-Sea, Northumberland. She was on a voyage from Bergen to Newcastle upon Tyne, Northumberland.
Umvoti	United Kingdom	The steamship collided with Tweedsdale (United Kingdom) at Madras, India and was severely damaged.
William Owen	United States	The barque collided with a steamship off the Goodwin Sands and was severely damaged. She was on a voyage from Rotterdam, South Holland, Netherlands to an American port. She was assisted in to Dover, Kent.

== 15 January ==
List of shipwrecks: 15 January 1881
Ship	State	Description
Agnes Strout	United Kingdom	The schooner was run down by the steamship Gemma (Germany) and sank in the North Sea off Dunwich, Suffolk. Her six crew were rescued by Gemma. Agnes Strout was on a voyage from Liverpool, Lancashire to Newcastle upon Tyne, Northumberland.
Annie Ripley	United Kingdom	The ship was driven ashore at "Terneyden", North Holland, Netherlands. Her crew were rescued. She was on a voyage from Harlingen, Friesland, Netherlands to Newcastle upon Tyne.
Bannockburn	United Kingdom	The ship was destroyed fire at Chittagong, India.
Caroline Goodyear	United Kingdom	The schooner was run into by the steamship Laconia (United Kingdom) and sank in the Bristol Channel 15 nautical miles (28 km) north west of the Bardsey Lighthouse, Caernarfonshire with the loss of two of her six crew. Survivors were rescued by Laconia.
Cashier	France	The ship was driven ashore at Newcastle, Delaware, United States. She was on a voyage from Philadelphia, Pennsylvania, United States to Marseille, Bouches-du-Rhône. She was refloated with assistance and taken in to Newcastle.
John	United Kingdom	The brig departed from Hartlepool, County Durham for London. Subsequently lost with all nine crew.
Lumley	United Kingdom	The brig stranded on a rock approximately one mile (1.6 km) offshore, off Upgang, Yorkshire with the loss of all ten crew. The Upgang Lifeboat Joseph Sykes and the Whitby Lifeboat Robert Whitworth (both Royal National Lifeboat Institution) were unable to rescue her crew despite numerous attempts to do so. Lumley was on a voyage from the River Tyne to Motril, Spain.
Mary	United Kingdom	The barque was abandoned at sea. Her crew were rescued by the steamship Samaria (United Kingdom). Mary was on a voyage from Belize City, British Guiana to Goole, Yorkshire.
Una	United Kingdom	The ship departed from Roscoff, Finistère, France for Shoreham-by-Sea, Sussex. No further trace, reported overdue.

== 16 January ==
List of shipwrecks: 16 January 1881
Ship	State	Description
BAP Apurímac	Peruvian Navy	War of the Pacific: Scuttling of the Peruvian fleet in El Callao: The frigate was scuttled by her crew at El Callao to prevent her capture by advancing Chilean forces.
BAP Atahualpa	Peruvian Navy	War of the Pacific: Scuttling of the Peruvian fleet in El Callao: The monitor was scuttled by her crew at El Callao to prevent her capture by advancing Chilean forces. She was salvaged later in 1881 and became a storage hulk.
Eneret, or Merit	Netherlands	The steamship ran aground off the Essex coast. Eight of her fifteen crew died before the Harwich Lifeboat Springwell ( Royal National Lifeboat Institution) rescued them on 20 January.
Fairy Maid	United Kingdom	The ship collided with the steamship British Queen (United Kingdom) off the Bar Lightship ( Trinity House) and was severely damaged. She was taken in to Birkenhead, Cheshire.
Henrietta	United Kingdom	The Thames barge was run down by the steamship Carbon (United Kingdom) and sank in the River Thames at Gravesend, Kent.
Ingerid	Netherlands	The steamship was wrecked off the coast of Essex with the loss of two of her sixteen crew. Seven survivors were rescued on 21 January by the Harwich Lifeboat Springwell ( Royal National Lifeboat Institution) or reached shore in a boat. Ingerid was on a voyage from Bergen, Norway to Naples, Italy.
Livonia	United Kingdom	The schooner ran aground on the Haisborough Sands, in the North Sea off the coast of Norfolk. Her crew were rescued by the Palling Lifeboat, but her captain refused to leave. She was on a voyage from Boulogne, Pas-de-Calais, France to Newcastle upon Tyne, Northumberland.
North Wales	United Kingdom	The barque ran aground on the Haisborough Sands. She was on a voyage from Newcastle upon Tyne to Java, Netherlands East Indies. All 21 people on board were rescued on 18 January by tugs.
Patterdale	United Kingdom	The steamship was driven ashore at Terneuzen, Zeeland, Netherlands. She was on a voyage from Odesa, Russia to Antwerp, Belgium. She was refloated.
Princess Royal	United Kingdom	The ship was sighted in the Bristol Channel between Steep Holm, Somerset and Lundy Island, Devon. She was on a voyage from Newport, Monmouthshire to Plymouth, Devon. No further trace, reported overdue.
BAP República	Peruvian Navy	War of the Pacific: Scuttling of the Peruvian fleet in El Callao: The torpedo boat was scuttled by her crew at El Callao to prevent her capture by advancing Chilean forces.
BAP Talismán	Peruvian Navy	War of the Pacific: Scuttling of the Peruvian fleet in El Callao: The troopship was scuttled by her crew at El Callao to prevent her capture by advancing Chilean forces.
BAP Toro Submarino	Peruvian Navy	War of the Pacific: Scuttling of the Peruvian fleet in El Callao: The submarine was scuttled by her crew at El Callao to prevent her capture by advancing Chilean forces.
Trafalgar	United Kingdom	The steamship ran aground on the Haisborough Sands, in the North Sea off the coast of Norfolk. Her nineteen crew were rescued by the Palling Lifeboat. She was on a voyage from Newcastle upon Tyne to Bombay, India.
BAP Unión	Peruvian Navy	Unión War of the Pacific: Scuttling of the Peruvian fleet in El Callao: The corvette was scuttled by her crew at El Callao to prevent her capture by advancing Chilean forces.

== 17 January ==
List of shipwrecks: 17 January 1881
Ship	State	Description
BAP Apurimac	Peruvian Navy	War of the Pacific: Scuttling of the Peruvian fleet in El Callao: The training ship, a steam frigate, was scuttled by her crew at El Callao, Peru, to prevent her capture by advancing Chilean forces.
BAP Atahualpa	Peruvian Navy	War of the Pacific: Scuttling of the Peruvian fleet in El Callao: The monitor was scuttled by her crew at El Callao, Peru, to prevent her capture by advancing Chilean forces. She was salvaged and hulked after the war and scrapped in the early 1900s.
Bessie	United Kingdom	The steamship departed from Saint-Valery-sur-Somme, Somme, France for Shoreham-by-Sea, Sussex. No further trace, reported overdue.
Chalaco	Peruvian Navy	War of the Pacific: Scuttling of the Peruvian fleet in El Callao: The steam transport was scuttled by her crew at El Callao, Peru, to prevent her capture by advancing Chilean forces.
Enterprise	United Kingdom	The dandy went ashore on Clodgy Point, St Ives, Cornwall. Her crew were taken off by the steamship Gwent (United Kingdom) before the dandy went ashore. Enterprise was on a voyage from Porthlethen, Cornwall to Bristol, Gloucestershire.
Eolos	Greece	The barque was wrecked at Alicante, Spain. She was on a voyage from New York, United States to Marseille, Bouches-du-Rhône, France.
Gaskea	United Kingdom	The ship was beached at Bremen. She was on a voyage from Middlesbrough, Yorkshire, United Kingdom to Brake. She was refloated and taken in to Bremen.
Hugh Fortescue	United Kingdom	The barque ran aground on the Goodwin Sands, Kent. She was on a voyage from Newcastle upon Tyne, Northumberland to Valparaíso, Chile. She was refloated with assistance from the tug Dreadnought (United Kingdom) and taken in to Dover, Kent in a leaky condition. She subsequently sailed for London.
Kong Carl	Norway	The barque anchored off Sully, Glamorgan, United Kingdom. She was on a voyage from Rusør to Cardiff, Glamorgan. No further trace.
Limeña	Peruvian Navy	War of the Pacific: Scuttling of the Peruvian fleet in El Callao: The steam transport was scuttled by her crew at El Callao, Peru, to prevent her capture by advancing Chilean forces.
BAP Loa	Peruvian Navy	War of the Pacific: Scuttling of the Peruvian fleet in El Callao: The training ship was scuttled by her crew at El Callao, Peru, to prevent her capture by advancing Chilean forces.
Oroya	Peruvian Navy	War of the Pacific: Scuttling of the Peruvian fleet in El Callao: The steam transport was scuttled by her crew at El Callao, Peru, to prevent her capture by advancing Chilean forces.
Peter Jebsen	Norway	The steamship ran aground in the Danube at Sulina, United Principalities.
Pioneer	United Kingdom	The steamship was driven ashore at Dungeness, Kent. She was on a voyage from Antwerp, Belgium to Havre de Grâce, Seine-Inférieure, France. She was refloated and resumed her voyage.
BAP República	Peruvian Navy	War of the Pacific: Scuttling of the Peruvian fleet in El Callao: The torpedo boat was scuttled by her crew at El Callao, Peru, to prevent her capture by advancing Chilean forces.
BAP Rímac	Peruvian Navy	War of the Pacific: Scuttling of the Peruvian fleet in El Callao: The troopship was scuttled by her crew at El Callao, Peru, to prevent her capture by advancing Chilean forces. She was salvaged in June 1881.
St. Bernhard	Germany	The ship was beached at Bremen. She was on a voyage from New York, United States to Bremen. She was refloated and taken in to Bremen.
Stooomvarts	Flag unknown	The steamship ran aground in the Elbe at Lühe. She was refloated and resumed her voyage.
Talismán	Peruvian Navy	War of the Pacific: Scuttling of the Peruvian fleet in El Callao: The steam transport was scuttled by her crew at El Callao, Peru, to prevent her capture by advancing Chilean forces.
Toro Submarino	Peruvian Navy	War of the Pacific: Scuttling of the Peruvian fleet in El Callao: The submarine was scuttled by her crew at El Callao, Peru, to prevent her capture by advancing Chilean forces. The Chileans later salvaged her as a war trophy.
BAP Unión	Peruvian Navy	War of the Pacific: Scuttling of the Peruvian fleet in El Callao: The corvette was scuttled by her crew at El Callao, Peru, to prevent her capture by advancing Chilean forces.
Three unnamed lighters	France	The lighters ran aground and sank at Havre de Grâce.

== 18 January ==
List of shipwrecks: 18 January 1881
Ship	State	Description
Abraham Thomas	Royal National Lifeboat Institution	The Great Yarmouth lifeboat capsized while returning with the sole survivor of Guiding Star. Two people survived; there were seven people on board at the time.
Admete	Norway	The barque was driven ashore and severely damaged at Aldeburgh, Suffolk, United Kingdom. Her twelve crew were rescued by rocket apparatus and breeches buoy. She was on a voyage from Stockholm, Sweden to Lisbon, Portugal.
Adolphus	United Kingdom	The fishing smack was driven ashore at Lyme, Dorset.
Agnes	United Kingdom	The skiff was severely damaged at Swansea.
Alexandre	France	The barque collided with the barque Mirella (United Kingdom) and was then driven ashore between Lavernock Point and Cardiff, Glamorgan, United Kingdom.
Amazon	(United Kingdom of Great Britain and Ireland) Jersey	The ketch was driven ashore and damaged at Penarth, Glamorgan. She was on a voyage from Jersey to Cardiff.
America	Norway	The barque was abandoned in the Bristol Channel . All but one of her crew were rescued by the tug Dunrobin (United Kingdom). America was on a voyage from Sharpness, Gloucestershire, United Kingdom to Baltimore, Maryland, United States. She came ashore at Warren Point, near Minehead, Somerset, United Kingdom and the other crew member was rescued.
Amiral Cecile	France	The barque was driven ashore at Lavernock Point. Her nine crew were rescued by rocket apparatus. Two bears were also rescued. She subsequently broke up.
Anna Decéil	France	The ketch was driven ashore at Ipswich, Suffolk.
Annie	United Kingdom	The ship was driven ashore at Penarth.
Annie Catherine	Germany	The schooner was driven ashore at Winterton-on-Sea, Norfolk, United Kingdom. Her crew were rescued by the Winterton Lifeboat. She was on a voyage from Stettin to Bordeaux, Gironde, France.
Ann Polly	United Kingdom	The skiff was severely damaged at Swansea.
Ann Turgoose	United Kingdom	The schooner was driven ashore and wrecked near Saltfleet, Lincolnshire. Her four crew were rescued. She was on a voyage from London to Hull, Yorkshire.
Aphrodite	Germany	The brigantine was driven ashore and wrecked at Eastbourne, Sussex, United Kingdom with the loss of four of her five crew. She was on a voyage from Newcastle upon Tyne, Northumberland, United Kingdom to Bari, Italy.
Aquila, and Wallace	United Kingdom; United States	The barque Wallace was driven into the paddle steamer Aquila at Weymouth, Dorset, driving Aquila into the jetty and severely damaging her.
Arabistan	Netherlands	The barquentine was driven ashore on Terschelling, Friesland. Her crew were rescued. She was on a voyage from Sundsvall, Sweden to Harlingen, Friesland. Arabistan was refloated. She was towed in to Great Yarmouth, Norfolk in a derelict condition on 21 January.
August	Germany	The barque was driven ashore at Portland, Dorset. She was on a voyage from Doboy, Georgia, United States to Dundee, Forfarshire, United Kingdom. She was refloated and taken in to Weymouth, where she collided with the steamship Great Western (United Kingdom).
Battle of Corunna	United Kingdom	The brig was drive ashore at Gorleston with the loss of all eight crew.
Belgian	Belgium	The fishing smack was driven ashore at Dovercourt, Essex, United Kingdom. Her four crew survived.
Bon Père	France	The ship was driven ashore at Lower Hope, Kent. She was on a voyage from Barfleur to London.
Baron Vrancyzany	Austria-Hungary	The barque ran aground on the Barnard Sand. She floated off and was driven ashore at Kessingland, Suffolk with the loss of all but one of the thirteen people on board. She was on a voyage from Leith, Lothian, United Kingdom to Philadelphia.
Brothers	United Kingdom	The smack was wrecked on Barry Island, Glamorgan. Her crew were rescued. She was on a voyage from Bristol, Gloucestershire to Newport, Monmouthshire.
Buckhurst	United Kingdom	The steamship was driven into Creole (United Kingdom) and then drove ashore at Penarth. Her crew were rescued. She was on a voyage from Cardiff to Bombay, India.
Cambrian	United Kingdom	The pilot boat sank in the Bristol Channel off Lynmouth, Devon. Her crew were rescued.
Catherine	(United Kingdom of Great Britain and Ireland) Jersey	The schooner was driven into a lighter and then into the quayside at Weymouth and was damaged.
Catherine de Boer	Germany	The schooner was driven ashore north of Grimsby, Lincolnshire. She was on a voyage from Stettin to Newcastle upon Tyne.
C. G. Michels, or G. C. Michels	Germany	The brig was damaged in a gale in the Bristol Channel off the coast of Glamorgan. She drove ashore at Lavernock Point. Her seven crew were rescued by rocket apparatus.
Charles	France	The chasse-marée sank off Great Yarmouth, Norfolk, United Kingdom with the loss of all hands, ten to twelve lives.
Charlotte	United Kingdom	The schooner was driven ashore and severely damaged at Hartlepool, County Durham. Her crew survived. She was on a voyage from London to Hartlepool.
Charlotte Dunbar	France	The brigantine was found ashore on Burnt Island, St Agnes, Isles of Scilly, United Kingdom after an overnight gale, and became a wreck. Her crew survived. She was on a voyage from Newport, Monmouthshire to Audierne and/or Morlaix, Finistère, France. There was no sign of the crew or the ship's boat.
Clara and Jessie	United Kingdom	The schooner was driven ashore and wrecked at Wexford. Her crew were rescued by rocket apparatus.
Cleveland, Iron Era, and John Bowes	United Kingdom	The steamship Cleveland collided with the steamship John Bowes in the River Tyne. She then collided with the steamship Iron Era. All three vessels were severely damaged. John Bowes was beached, but was refloated and taken in to South Shields, County Durham.
Concezione S.	Italy	The barque ran aground on the Shipwash Sand, in the North Sea off the coast of Suffolk with the loss of a crew member. Survivors were rescued by the steamship Avalon (United Kingdom), which lost a crew member effecting the rescue. Concezione S. was refloated with assistance and towed in to Harwich, Essex.
Courier	United Kingdom	The barque ran aground at Harwich. She was on a voyage from South Shields to Guernsey, Channel Islands. She was refloated the next day with assistance from the smack Jemima (United Kingdom) and taken in to Harwich in a leaky condition.
Cyril	United Kingdom	The trow was driven ashore at Cardiff.
Dauntless	United Kingdom	The skiff was severely damaged at Swansea.
Delhi	United Kingdom	The brig was driven ashore at Shaldon, Devon.
Deptford	United Kingdom	The collier, a schooner, was wrecked on the Cork Sand, in the North Sea off the coast of Essex with the loss of all nine crew. She was on a voyage from Hartlepool to London.
Diligence	United Kingdom	The trow was driven ashore and severely damaged at Penarth.
Donna Maria	(United Kingdom of Great Britain and Ireland) Jersey	The ship was severely damaged in a gale at Wexford.
Dorothea	Germany	The galiot was driven ashore at Shotley, Suffolk. She was on a voyage from Ipswich to Perth, United Kingdom.
Dour	United Kingdom	The smack foundered in the North Sea with the loss of five crew.
Dupuytren	France	The lugger was driven ashore at Saltfleet. Her crew were rescued. She was on a voyage from the Clyde to Seville, Spain.
Eclipse	United Kingdom	The luggage boat was one of four vessels driven through the pier at Ryde, Isle of Wight. destroying 200 feet (61 m) of the pier.
Edith Morgan	United Kingdom	The schooner ran aground on the Black Rocks, in the Sound of Islay. She was on a voyage from Runcorn, Cheshire and/or Liverpool, Lancashire to Newcastle upon Tyne.
Edith Mary	United Kingdom	The barque was driven ashore at Great Yarmouth with the loss of five of her ten crew. Survivors were rescued by rocket apparatus. She was on a voyage from South Shields to Saint Thomas, Virgin Islands.
Edward Peck	United Kingdom	The schooner sprang a leak and was beached 6 nautical miles (11 km) north of Bude, Cornwall. Her crew survived. She was on a voyage from Middlesbrough, Yorkshire to Cardiff.
Edwin	United Kingdom	The skiff was wrecked at Swansea.
Elizabeth	United Kingdom	The ship was driven ashore and damaged at Penarth.
Eliza Jane	United Kingdom	The ship was driven ashore at Corton, Suffolk with the loss of two of her four crew. Survivors were rescued by rocket apparatus. She was on a voyage from Stonehaven, Aberdeenshire to London.
Ellen	United Kingdom	The ship was driven ashore and damaged at Lavernock Point.
Erin	United Kingdom	The ship was severely damaged in a gale at Wexford.
Emilie	France	The brig was driven ashore and wrecked at Lavernock Point.
Eris	United Kingdom	The sloop was driven ashore in Studland Bay. Her crew survived.
Etta	United Kingdom	The full-rigged ship was driven ashore at Lavernock Point. Her crew were rescued. She was refloated.
Fairy	United Kingdom	The Yorkshire Billyboy was driven ashore at Shotley. She was refloated on 3 February.
Fear Not	United Kingdom	The skiff was severely damaged at Swansea.
Felix and Rosalie	France	The schooner foundered approximately 1.5 nautical miles (2.8 km) west of Boscastle, Cornwall. Five men and a boy landed near King Arthur's Castle. She was on a voyage from Trouville, Manche, France to Swansea, Glamorgan.
Filomene	Austria-Hungary	The brig ran aground near Lavernock Point and was wrecked. She was refloated on 29 January and taken in to Cardiff.
HMS Firefly	Royal Navy	The Forester-class gunboat sank in the River Medway at Upnor, Kent. Her crew survived.
Fishguard Lass	United Kingdom	The ship was driven ashore at Porthdinllaen, Caernarfonshire. Her three crew were rescued by the Porthdinllaen Lifeboat George Moor ( Royal National Lifeboat Institution).
Florence Muspratt	United Kingdom	The ship was severely damaged in a gale at Wexford.
Franeés	France	The brigantine was driven ashore at Aldeburgh. Her six crew were rescued.
General Havelock	United Kingdom	The collier was driven into Ryde Pier, Isle of Wight.
Georgiana	United Kingdom	The trow was driven ashore at Penarth.
Glenorcum	United Kingdom	The steamship ran aground on the Maplin Sand, in the North Sea off the coast of Essex.
Goeland	France	The chasse-marée was driven ashore at Lymington, Hampshire, United Kingdom. She was on a voyage from Cowes, Isle of Wight, United Kingdom to Bordeaux.
Greek Slave	United Kingdom	The schooner was driven ashore north of Grimsby.
Guiding Star	United Kingdom	The schooner went ashore at Great Yarmouth. The captain and two crew were ashore, and the mate left on board drowned when the Great Yarmouth Lifeboat Abraham Thomas ( Royal National Lifeboat Institution) capsized after taking him from the vessel.
Gyda	Norway	The brig drove ashore at Winterton-on-Sea. Her four crew were rescued by the Winterton Lifeboat Edward Birkbeck ( Royal National Lifeboat Institution). She was on a voyage from Sundsvall, Sweden to Dunkirk, Nord, France.
Gylfe	Denmark	The ship was driven ashore and wrecked at Orfordhaven, Suffolk. Her eight crew were rescued.
Hanna	Norway	The brigantine was wrecked on the Lemon and Owers Sandbank, in the North Sea with the loss of two of her crew. Survivors were rescued by Eleanor (Norway). Hanna was on a voyage from Kristiansand to Ghent, East Flanders, Belgium.
Hasselo	Norway	The brigantine was wrecked on the Maplin Sand. Her eight crew were rescued by the Clacton Lifeboat Albert Edward ( Royal National Lifeboat Institution). Hasselo was on a voyage from Riga, Russia to London.
Havelock	United Kingdom	The collier was one of four vessels driven through the pier at Ryde, Isle of Wight, destroying 200 feet (61 m) of the pier. She was consequently scuttled.
Helena	United Kingdom	The ship was driven ashore and wrecked at Harwich.
Hercules	Norway	The barque ran aground on the Cross Sand, in the North Sea off the coast of Norfolk. She was on a voyage from Fredrikstad to Hayle, Cornwall. She was refloated beached at Winterton-on-Sea, Norfolk. Subsequently taken in to Gorleston, Suffolk in a waterlogged condition.
H. S. B.	United Kingdom	The skiff was severely damaged at Swansea.
Italia	Norway	The barque ran aground on the Ridge Sand, in the North Sea off the coast of Essex. She was on a voyage from New York, United States to Ipswich. Italia floated off and ran aground on the Guard Sand.
Jane	United Kingdom	The fishing smack was driven ashore at Lyme.
Jean and Marie	France	The ship was driven ashore at Penarth Head, Glamorgan.
Jeanne Marie	France	The brigantine was driven ashore between Lavernock Point and Cardiff.
Jeune Emile	France	The brig was driven ashore and wrecked at Cardiff.
Johan	Sweden	The barque was driven ashore at Lavernock Point. Her crew were rescued.
John Ward	United Kingdom	The collier was one of four vessels driven through the pier at Ryde, destroying 200 feet (61 m) of the pier. She consequently sank.
J. W. S.	United Kingdom	The skiff was severely damaged at Swansea.
Laura	United Kingdom	The brig was driven ashore and severely damaged at Hartlepool. Her crew survived. She was on a voyage from Sunderland, County Durham to Southampton, Hampshire.
Leader	United Kingdom	The smack was wrecked at Sizewell, Suffolk. Her crew were rescued by rocket apparatus.
Lerrin	United Kingdom	The crewless schooner was driven ashore in Bideford Bay.
Lily	United Kingdom	The fishing smack was driven ashore and wrecked at Lyme.
Lily Green	United Kingdom	The ship was driven ashore at Porthdinllaen.
Lucknow	United Kingdom	The ship was one of four vessels driven through the pier at Ryde. destroying 200 feet (61 m) of the pier. She was wrecked.
Marie	United Kingdom	The schooner ran aground on the Halliday Flats, in the North Sea off the coast of Essex. She was on a voyage from Wisbech, Cambridgeshire to Rotterdam, South Holland, Netherlands. She was refloated and taken in to Mill Bay in a leaky condition. Marie subsequently drove ashore at Dovercourt. She was later refloated and towed in to Harwich.
Maja	Germany	The ship was driven ashore near Clougher Head, County Louth, United Kingdom. Her crew were rescued. She was on a voyage from Belfast, County Antrim, United Kingdom to Hamburg.
Martha and Anne	United Kingdom	The skiff was severely damaged at Swansea.
Martin Maria	United Kingdom	The barque was driven ashore and wrecked at Southwold, Suffolk with the loss of ten of her thirteen crew. She was on a voyage from South Shields to Monaco.
Marmora	United Kingdom	The ship was run down and sunk at Bordeaux by the steamship Hathersage (United Kingdom).
Martha	United Kingdom	The schooner ran aground on the Maplin Sand. She was refloated on 30 January and towed in to the River Thames in a leaky condition.
Martha	United Kingdom	The skiff was wrecked at Swansea.
Mary Ann	United Kingdom	The schooner was driven ashore at Great Yarmouth with the loss of one of her four crew. Survivors were rescued by rocket apparatus. She was on a voyage from Whitehaven, Cumberland to Great Yarmouth.
Mary Ann White	United Kingdom	The ship was wrecked at Newquay, Cornwall with the loss of her captain.
Medina	United Kingdom	The smack was driven ashore at Cowes.
Miner	United Kingdom	The ship was driven ashore at Penarth.
Mirella	United Kingdom	The barque collided with the barque Alexandre (France) and was then driven ashore and damaged at Lavernock Point. Her ten crew were rescued by rocket apparatus. Mirella was refloated on 29 January and taken in to Cardiff.
Miss Beck	United Kingdom	The ship was driven ashore and wrecked at Porthdinllaen. Her five crew were rescued by the Porthdinllaen Lifeboat George Moor ( Royal National Lifeboat Institution).
Marton	United Kingdom	The steamship was driven ashore and wrecked at Middleton, County Durham. Four of her crew were rescued by rocket apparatus; the rest remained on board.
Mystery	United Kingdom	The ship was severely damaged in a gale at Wrexham.
Nana Deceil	France	The ketch was driven ashore at Great Yarmouth. Her four crew were rescued by the Great Yarmouth Lifeboat. She was on a voyage from Hull to Calais.
New Unity	United Kingdom	The smack was wrecked on the Grain Spit, off the Isle of Grain, Kent. Her crew survived.
Norton	United Kingdom	The skiff was severely damaged at Swansea.
Olive Branch	United Kingdom	The smack was driven ashore and wrecked at Dunwich, Suffolk. Her six crew were rescued.
Palestine	United Kingdom	The barque was wrecked at Sizewell. Her nine crew were rescued by the rocket apparatus. She was on a voyage from Dover, Kent to West Hartlepool, County Durham.
Parkside	United Kingdom	The ship was driven ashore at Penarth Head.
Pearl	United Kingdom	The Yorkshire Billyboy was driven ashore at Shotley.
HMS Penelope	Royal Navy	The central-battery ironclad was driven from her moorings at Harwich and ran aground in the River Stour.
Percy	United Kingdom	The ship was sighted off Lowestoft, Suffolk. No further trace, presumed foundered with the loss of all nine crew.
P. F.	France	The brig was driven ashore at Aldeburgh. Her ten crew were rescued by rocket apparatus. She was on a voyage from Saint-Malo, Ille-et-Vilaine to Kennetpans, Stirlingshire, United Kingdom.
Portia	Flag unknown	The brigantine ran aground on the Maplin Sand and was wrecked. Her crew were rescued.
Providence	United Kingdom	The schooner was driven ashore at Middleton. Her four crew were rescued by rocket apparatus. She was on a voyage from Shoreham-by-Sea, Sussex to Hartlepool.
Providence	France	The smack ran aground on the Warden Ledge, off the Isle of Wight and sank. Her crew survived. She was on a voyage from Kerzerho, Morbihan to Shoreham-by-Sea, Sussex.
Rambler	United Kingdom	The schooner was driven ashore and wrecked at Wexford. Her crew were rescued by rocket apparatus. She was on a voyage from Llanelly, Glamorgan to Wexford.
Rapid	United Kingdom	The brig was driven ashore at Gorleston with the loss of all seven crew.
Reindeer	United Kingdom	The ketch was driven ashore and severely damaged at Bloody Point, near Harwich.
Reine du Ciel	France	The ketch was driven ashore at Great Yarmouth. Her four crew were rescued by the Great Yarmouth Lifeboat. She was on a voyage from Hull to Calais. She was refloated on 28 January and taken in to Great Yarmouth.
Restless	United Kingdom	The brigantine was driven ashore and wrecked at Penarth. Six of her crew were rescued by rocket apparatus and breeches buoy.
Rhoda	United Kingdom	The schooner was driven ashore at Great Yarmouth. All five people on board were rescued by rocket apparatus. She was on a voyage from Boulogne, Pas-de-Calais, France to Seaham, County Durham.
Rhoda Jemima	United Kingdom	The smack was driven ashore in Studland Bay. Her crew were ashore at the time.
Richard	United Kingdom	The smack was driven ashore and wrecked at "Little Stoke", Somerset. Her crew were rescued.
Rising Sun	United Kingdom	The ketch was driven ashore at Sunderland. Her four crew were rescued by rocket apparatus. She was on a voyage from Great Yarmouth to Sunderland. Also reported as happening at Seaham, County Durham, that being her destination.
Robert and John	United Kingdom	The skiff was severely damaged at Swansea.
Rook	United Kingdom	The steamship sank at Lookdow, near Tobermory, Isle of Mull. She was on a voyage from Greenock, Renfrewshire to Gothenburg, Sweden.
Rosa Joseph	France	The schooner was driven ashore at St. Ives, Cornwall. Her five crew were rescued by the St. Ives Lifeboat. She was on a voyage from Briton Ferry, Glamorgan to Cherbourg, Manche.
Rosetta Patrona	Italy	The barque foundered off Dunwich with the loss of all on board. The ship's dog survived. She was on a voyage from South Shields to Genoa.
Ruhtinas	(Russian Empire) Grand Duchy of Finland	The barque was driven ashore and severely damaged at Aldeburgh with the loss of two of her sixteen crew. She was on a voyage from Turku to Gibraltar.
Sancho	United Kingdom	The brig was driven ashore at Great Yarmouth with the loss of all hands.
Sans Souci	France	The ship was wrecked at Cádiz, Spain. Her crew were rescued.
Sarah Jane	United Kingdom	The three-masted schooner was driven ashore at Great Yarmouth with the loss of the mate from her four crew. Survivors were rescued by rocket apparatus. She was on a voyage from Whitehaven to Great Yarmouth.
Sarah Jane	United Kingdom	The skiff was severely damaged at Swansea.
Shaftesbury	United Kingdom	The training ship was driven from her moorings at Grays, Essex and driven upstream. She was driven ashore. All 376 people on board were rescued by two tugs. She was refloated and towed to Greenhithe, Kent.
Silvas	United Kingdom	The Yorkshire Billyboy was driven ashore and severely damaged at Shotley. She was on a voyage from Ipswich to Beverley, Yorkshire.
Sisters	United Kingdom	The skiff was wrecked at Swansea.
Southwick	United Kingdom	The steamship ran aground on the Potato Garth, in the River Wear and was severely damaged. She was on a voyage from Boulogne, Pas-de-Calais to Sunderland.
Spencer	United Kingdom	The sloop was driven ashore in the River Stour between Harwich and Mistley, Essex. She was on a voyage from London to Goole, Yorkshire.
Springwell	Royal National Lifeboat Institution	The lifeboat capsized off Harwich with the loss of one of her twelve crew whilst going to the assistance of a barque.
Ste. Anne	France	The schooner was driven ashore and wrecked between Lavernock and Cardiff.
Star of Peace	United Kingdom	The fishing smack was wrecked on the Corton Sand, in the North Sea off the coast of Suffolk with the loss of all hands.
Success	United Kingdom	The brigantine was driven ashore at Grimsby. She was on a voyage from Sunderland to a French port. Se was refloated on 20 January and towed in to Grimsby in a severely leaky condition.
Sunderland Packet	United Kingdom	The ship was driven ashore at Lower Hope.
Sunny South	United Kingdom	The skiff was wrecked at Swansea.
Swift	United Kingdom	The schooner was driven ashore north of Grimsby. She was on a voyage from Brussels, West Flanders, Belgium to Goole, Yorkshire.
Tartar	United Kingdom	The brig came ashore at Shovepoint, Walton-on-the-Naze, Essex. She was on a voyage from Sunderland to Whitstable, Kent. She was refloated the next day.
Tartar	United Kingdom	The wherry was driven ashore and wrecked at Seaview, Isle of Wight.
Tatworth	United Kingdom	The fishing smack was driven ashore and wrecked at Lyme.
Topaz	United Kingdom	The lugger was driven ashore and severely damaged at Dover. Both crew were rescued.
Trader	United Kingdom	The fishing smack was driven ashore at Lyme.
Twin Brothers	United Kingdom	The skiff was wrecked at Swansea.
Twin Brothers	United Kingdom	The skiff was severely damaged at Swansea.
Unity	United Kingdom	The sloop was driven ashore in Studland Bay. Her crew survived.
Velindra	United Kingdom	The steamship foundered in the Bristol Channel with the loss of all hands. She was on a voyage from Swansea to Bristol.
Veracity	United Kingdom	The brig was driven ashore north of Grimsby.
Victor	United Kingdom	The tug was damaged by ice and sank at Leith.
Victor	France	The fishing lugger was driven ashore at Pevensey Bay, Sussex. Her crew were rescued.
Victor	Norway	The barque was driven ashore at Minatitlán.
Wave	United Kingdom	The trow was driven ashore at Penarth.
West Kent	United Kingdom	The barge was driven through Southend Pier, Essex, destroying 25 yards (23 m) of the pier.
White Eagle	United Kingdom	The schooner was driven ashore and wrecked at Lavernock Point.
Wild Wave	United Kingdom	The skiff was severely damaged at Swansea.
Why Not I	United Kingdom	The skiff was wrecked at Swansea.
William	United Kingdom	The schooner was driven ashore and sank in the River Mersey. Her crew were rescued by the Hoylake Lifeboat. She was refloated on 28 January and taken in to Hoylake, Cheshire.
Zoe	France	The barque was driven out to sea from Penarth. No further trace.
No. 5	United Kingdom	The pilot boat was driven ashore and severely damaged at Cardiff.
Eastbourne Lifeboat	United Kingdom	The lifeboat was damaged during launching to go to the assistance of Aphrodite (Germany).
26 unnamed vessels	United Kingdom (24); United Kingdom (2)	Twenty-six barges sank in the River Thames at North Woolwich, Middlesex with the loss of three lives.
Several unnamed vessels	United Kingdom	At least eight fishing boats went ashore at Harwich.
Several unnamed vessels	United Kingdom	Several trows from Gloucester and Bristol were driven ashore, some of them at the mouth of the River Ely.
Several unnamed vessels	United Kingdom	Several vessels foundered at Ryde.
Many unnamed vessels	United Kingdom	Many vessels foundered at in Brixham harbour, Devon with some washed onto the streets.
Two unnamed vessels	United Kingdom	The luggers were driven ashore and wrecked at Dover.
Two unnamed vessels	United Kingdom; Board of Customs	The steam launches were sunk by ice in the River Thames at Gravesend.
Four unnamed vessels	Flags unknown	The ships were driven ashore between Lavernock Point and Cardiff.
Unnamed	United Kingdom	The ketch was driven ashore at Sunderland. Her crew were rescued.
Unnamed	Austria-Hungary	The barque was driven ashore on the coast of Glamorgan. Her crew were rescued.
Six unnamed vessels	United Kingdom	A brigantine and five smacks sank off Grimsby.
Twelve unnamed vessels	United Kingdom	The fishing boats were wrecked at Selsey, Sussex. Their crews survived.
Two unnamed vessels	United Kingdom	A barque and a brig were driven ashore at Lower Hope.
Unnamed	Flag unknown	The barque was driven ashore at Harwich.
Two unnamed vessels	Flags unknown	The ships were driven ashore at Gorleston.
Unnamed	Flag unknown	The ship was run into by the barque Brunette (United Kingdom) and was severely damaged at Swansea.
Unnamed	United Kingdom	The ketch was abandoned off Caldy Island, Pembrokeshire. Her three crew reached the island in their boat.
Several unnamed vessels	Flags unknown	The ships were driven ashore at Portland, Dorset.
Two unnamed vesseks	Flags unknown	A brig and a brigantine were driven ashore north of Grimsby.
Unnamed	United Kingdom	The ferry broke from her moorings at Penarth. She was run into and sunk by a barge. Both crew members were rescued.
Three unnamed vessels	United Kingdom	The barges sank at Southend, Essed.
Unnamed	Flag unknown	The brig was driven ashore on Horsey Island, Essex.
Unnamed	United Kingdom	The yacht sank at Seaview.
Unnamed	Flag unknown	The schooner was driven ashore at Dunwich with the loss of all hands.
Unnamed	United Kingdom	The Yorkshire Billyboy was driven ashore and severely damaged at Bloody Point.
Unnamed	Trinity House	The pilot cutter was driven ashore and severely damaged at Harwich.

== 19 January ==
List of shipwrecks: 19 January 1881
Ship	State	Description
Achilles	United Kingdom	The ketch sank off the mouth of the River Ely. Twelve crew were rescued. She was on a voyage from Newport, Monmouthshire to Padstow, Cornwall.
Anthrodite	Netherlands	The brig was wrecked off Beachy Head, Sussex, United Kingdom and four of the crew were drowned.
Bolivia	Canada	The barque was driven ashore at Barfleur, Manche, France. Her crew were rescued. She was on a voyage from Honfleur, Calvados, France to the Hampton Roads, Virginia.
Clan Campbell	United Kingdom	The barque was driven ashore on the south coast of Ailsa Craig. Her crew survived. She was on a voyage from Havre de Grâce, Seine-Inférieure, France to Glasgow, Renfrewshire.
Ellen	United Kingdom	The schooner was abandoned off Cemaes, Anglesey. Her three crew were rescued. She was on a voyage from Dublin to Bangkok, Siam.
Hardangeren	Norway	The schooner ran aground and was wrecked at "Kulo".
Heinrich Elise	Germany	The ship was driven ashore and wrecked at Viana do Castelo, Portugal. She was on a voyage from Bremen to Porto, Portugal.
Joseph and Mary	United Kingdom	The ship ran aground on the Brook Ledge, off the Isle of Wight. Her crew were rescued. She was on a voyage from Penryn, Cornwall to London.
Lucille	United Kingdom	The brig ran aground on the Cross Sand, in the North Sea off the coast of Norfolk and was abandoned with the loss of five crew of her eight crew. Lucille was on a voyage from Bo'ness, Lothian to Newport, Monmouthshire. She was subsequently boarded by four crew from the barque James Mason (United Kingdom) and taken in to the River Tyne.
Mary Ann	United Kingdom	The ketch was driven ashore and wrecked at Newquay, Cornwall with the loss of one of her three crew. She was on a voyage from a French port to Bristol, Gloucestershire.
Pandora	United Kingdom	The brig ran aground on Wisbech Eye, in the River Nene and was wrecked. She was on a voyage from Danzig, Germany to Wisbech, Cambridgeshire.
Peace	United Kingdom	The ship was driven ashore at the Hurst Castle, Hampshire. She was on a voyage from Fowey, Cornwall to Brussels, West Flanders, Belgium. She was refloated and taken in to Cowes, Isle of Wight.
Penelope Tutton	United Kingdom	The schooner was abandoned at sea. Her crew were rescued by Hedwig (Flag unknown). Penelope Tutton was on a voyage from Puerto Cabello, Venezuela to Swansea, vGlamorgan.
Rising Sun	United Kingdom	The schooner went ashore in the River Thames. Her crew were rescued.
Susan	United Kingdom	The fishing dandy collided with the barque Draupner (Norway) and sank off Lowestoft with the loss of a crew member. Survivors were rescued by Draupner.
Visitor	United Kingdom	The brig sank 2 nautical miles (3.7 km) off Robin Hoods Bay, Yorkshire. Her crew were rescued by the Whitby Lifeboat.
William McGowan	United Kingdom	The ship was driven ashore at Grimsby, Lincolnshire. She was on a voyage from Lowestoft, Suffolk to Seaham, County Durham.
Unnamed vessels	Flags unknown	Nine vessels were wrecked off Great Yarmouth and nearly fifty lives were lost. Many wrecks on the coast around Harwich, Essex, United Kingdom.
Unnamed vessels	Flags unknown	Thirty vessels were beached near Cardiff, Glamorgan.
Unnamed	Flag unknown	The ship was wrecked at "Misener Haven" with the loss of all hands.
Unnamed	Norway	The ship foundered in the Bristol Channel off Warren Point, Somerset, United Kingdom. Her crew were rescued. She was on a voyage from Bristol to Baltimore, Maryland, United States.
Unnamed	Netherlands	The sfishing smack was wrecked on the Longsand with the loss of six of her seven crew. The survivor was rescued on 21 January by the lugger Secret (United Kingdom).
Unnamed	United Kingdom	The fishing boat capsized off Portnaguran, Isle of Lewis, Outer Hebrides with the loss of all six crew.

== 20 January ==
List of shipwrecks: 20 January 1881
Ship	State	Description
Anna Maria	Norway	The schooner struck a reef off the Carse of Ardseer. She was beached at Fort George, Inverness-shire, United Kingdom, where she became a wreck. Her four crew were rescued; one by a coble and three by the Nairn Lifeboat. She was on a voyage from Kragerø to Wick, Caithness, United Kingdom.
Attila	United Kingdom	The ship ran aground on the Sunk Sand, in the North Sea off the coast of Kent. Eleven of her fifteen crew were rescued by the smacks Admiral and Jane Elizabeth (both United Kingdom). Attila was on a voyage from Newcastle upon Tyne, Northumberland to La Spezia, Italy. She was subsequently towed in to Ramsgate, Kent by the tug Bradford (United Kingdom).
Bothalwood	United Kingdom	The barque struck rocks in St Ouen's Bay, Jersey, Channel Islands. Her crew survived. She was on a voyage from Cartagena, Spain to Leith, Lothian.
Chimera	United Kingdom	The schooner was driven ashore at Ryde, Isle of Wight. She was on a voyage from Sunderland, County Durham to Shoreham-by-Sea, Sussex.
Collaroy	New South Wales	Collaroy The paddle steamer ran ashore at Collaroy. She was refloated on 9 September 1884. Subsequently repaired and returned to service.
Gracia	United Kingdom	The steamship ran aground near the Tuskar Rock and was damaged. She was on a voyage from Liverpool, Lancashire to Havana, Cuba. She was refloated and put in to Queenstown, County Cork in a leaky condition.
Hannah	Norway	The schooner ran aground off Great Yarmouth, Norfolk, United Kingdom with the loss of one of her six crew.
Linda	United Kingdom	The steamship was driven ashore and sank at Civitavecchia, Italy. Her crew survived. She was on a voyage from Newcastle upon Tyne, Northumberland to Civitavecchia. She was later refloated.
Oder	Germany	The steamship ran aground in the Weser. She was refloated and put back to Bremen.
Otto	Germany	The steamship ran aground on the Hobbles Sands, in the Humber. She was on a voyage from Danzig to Hull.
Pegasus	United Kingdom	The ship foundered in the Atlantic Ocean. Her 21 crew were rescued by the steamship Titian (United Kingdom). Pegasus was on a voyage from Cardiff, Glamorga to Rio de Janeiro, Brazil.
Victory	United Kingdom	The ship was driven ashore at South Kessock, Inverness-shire. She was on a voyage from Nairn to Oban, Argyllshire.
Unnamed	Flag unknown	The schooner was driven ashore in the Humber.

== 21 January ==
List of shipwrecks: 21 January 1881
Ship	State	Description
Achilles	United Kingdom	The ship was abandoned in the Atlantic Ocean. Her 21 crew were rescued by the barque Achilles (United Kingdom).
British Lady	United Kingdom	The schooner sank near the Runnel Stone, Devon. Her crew were rescued by the ferry Queen of the Bay (United Kingdom). British Lady was on a voyage from Porthcawl, Glamorgan to Penzance, Cornwall.
Buckinghamshire	United Kingdom	The full-rigged ship was driven ashore on the coast of Glamorgan.
Cecile	France	The ship was driven ashore on the coast of Glamorgan.
Eliza Jane	United Kingdom	The ship was abandoned in the Atlantic Ocean 40 nautical miles (74 km) off the Isles of Scilly. Her crew were rescued by the barque Amable Catarina (Italy). Eliza Jane was on a voyage from Neath, Glamorgan to Saint-Malo, Ille-et-Vilaine, France.
Hertha	Denmark	The ship ran aground on the south coast of Læsø.
Levang	Norway	The schooner was driven ashore at Gullane Ness, Lothian, United Kingdom. She was on a voyage from Alloa, Clackmannanshire, United Kingdom to Saint-Malo. She was refloated and taken in to Leith, Lothian for repairs.
Lynwood	United Kingdom	The schooner was wrecked in Grouville Bay, Jersey, Channel Islands. Her crew were rescued. She was on a voyage from Huelva, Spain to Swansea, Glamorgan.
Mary Lowerson	United Kingdom	The ship departed from Belfast, County Antrim for Saint John, New Brunswick, Canada. No further trace, reported overdue.
Souerah	France	The steamship was driven ashore and severely damaged at Gibraltar. She was on a voyage from the Canary Islands to Marseille, Bouches-du-Rhône. Also reported as lost off Casablanca, Morocco on 16 January.
Unnamed	United Kingdom	The fishing boat foundered off the Isle of Lewis, Outer Hebrides with the loss of all six crew.
Unnamed	Belgium	The steamship ran aground off Vlissingen, Zeeland, Netherlands. She was on a voyage from New York, United States to Antwerp.
Unnamed	United Kingdom	The barge broke from its moorings at Lambeth, London and sank in the River Thames near Waterloo Bridge.

== 22 January ==
List of shipwrecks: 22 January 1881
Ship	State	Description
Albertine	United Kingdom	The ship was lost on the coast of Brazil. Her crew were rescued. She was on a voyage from Aracaju, Brazil to the English Channel.
British Lady	United Kingdom	The schooner was abandoned off the Runnel Stone, Devon. Her crew were rescued by the steamship Queen of the Bay (United Kingdom). British Lady was on a voyage from Porthcawl, Glamorgan to Penzance, Cornwall.
Elizabeth	United Kingdom	The ship was driven ashore in the River Thames at Lower Hope, Kent. She was on a voyage from London to Penzance.
Forest Fairy	United Kingdom	The schooner was driven ashore in the Gulf of Volos. She was refloated with the assistance of an Ottoman Navy, warship.
Invicta	United Kingdom	The yacht was sunk by ice in the River Thames at Erith, Kent. No-one was aboard at the time.
Message	France	The lugger was driven ashore at Padstow, Cornwall. She was on a voyage from Nantes, Basses-Pyrénées to Newport, Monmouthshire, United Kingdom. She was refloated with assistance.
Mintie	United States	The sternwheeler was sunk in Perdido Bay when her boiler exploded three miles (4.8 km) east of Minez Ferry. Three people were killed.
Thomas	United Kingdom	The ship was driven ashore in the River Thames at Lower Hope. She was on a voyage from London to Penzance.

== 23 January ==
List of shipwrecks: 23 January 1881
Ship	State	Description
Alarm	United Kingdom	The tug was holed by ice and sank at Bristol, Gloucestershire. The sole crew member aboard was rescued by the tug White Cloud (United Kingdom).
Emma	United Kingdom	The schooner ran aground off Eastbourne, Sussex.

== 24 January ==
List of shipwrecks: 24 January 1881
Ship	State	Description
Gloamin	United Kingdom	The steamship struck the Carr Rocks and was beached at Boarhills, Fife. She was on a voyage from Sunderland, County Durham to Dundee, Forfarshire.
Leopoldine	Germany	The brig was abandoned in the Bristol Channel 40 nautical miles (74 km) west of Lundy Island, Devon, United Kingdom. Her crew were rescued by Annie ( Canada). Leopoldine was on a voyage from Liverpool, Lancashire, United Kingdom to the Congo River.
Pandora	United Kingdom	The steam yacht was driven ashore near Hampstead Point, Isle of Wight. She was refloated and resumed her voyage.

== 25 January ==
List of shipwrecks: 25 January 1881
Ship	State	Description
Ardandhu	United Kingdom	The steamship collided with the steamship State of Indiana (United Kingdom) and sank in the Clyde at Bowling, Dunbartonshire. Arandhu was on a voyage from Bilbao, Spain to Glasgow, Renfrewshire. She was refloated on 28 January and taken in to Glasgow.
Atlantique	France	The ship was wrecked at Cette, Hérault. She was on a voyage from Swansea, Glamorgan, United Kingdom to Cette.
Fairwind	United Kingdom	The barque was anamdpmed in the Atlantic Ocean. Her crew were rescued by the barque Jumna (United States). Fairwind was on a voyage from Pensacola, Florida, United States to Penarth, Glamorgan.
Hebe	Germany	The barque was driven ashore at Liepāja, Courland Governorate. She was on a voyage from Pillau to Boston.
Henry Brand	United Kingdom	The steamship ran aground in the River Usk. She was refloated.
Intrepid	United Kingdom	The steamship was driven ashore at Alexandria, Egypt. She was on a voyage from Alexandria to King's Lynn, Norfolk. She was refloated and taken in to Alexandria.
Joven Pepe	Spain	The steamship was driven onto the foundations of the mole when entering Cette, France in a gale and became a wreck; the crew were saved.
Maude	United Kingdom	The schooner was driven ashore at Lindisfarne, Northumberland. She was on a voyage from Bremen, Germany to Runcorn, Cheshire. She was refloated with assistance.

== 26 January ==
List of shipwrecks: 26 January 1881
Ship	State	Description
Bonita	(Dominion of Newfoundland) Newfoundland Colony	The ship departed from Harbour Grace for Lisbon, Portugal. No further trace, reported missing.
Unnamed	Flag unknown	The steamship was driven ashore at Hartlepool, County Durham, United Kingdom. She was refloated and resumed her voyage.
Unnamed	Flag unknown	The ship sank in the Weilingen, off the coast of Zeeland, Netherlands.
Unnamed	Flag unknown	The Portuguese or Spanish schooner collided with the barque Alexander (United Kingdom) and sank between Cape Trafalgar, Spain and Cape St. Vincent, Portugal.

== 27 January ==
List of shipwrecks: 27 January 1881
Ship	State	Description
Bear	United Kingdom	The steamship ran aground at the mouth of the River Tees. She was on a voyage from Middlesbrough, Yorkshire to Grangemouth, Stirlingshire. She was refloated and put back to Middlesbrough.
Breizel	France	The barque was driven ashore at Deal, Kent, United Kingdom. She was on a voyage from Calais to Bordeaux, Gironde. She was refloated and taken in to The Downs.
Claremont	United Kingdom	The steamship was wrecked at Whale Chine, Isle of Wight. Thirteen of her eighteen crew took to the ship's lifeboat; the rest were rescued by the Brooke Lifeboat Worcester Cadet ( Royal National Lifeboat Institution). Claremont was on a voyage from Garrucha, Spain to Middlesbrough, Yorkshire.
Cresswell	United Kingdom	The barque was driven ashore and wrecked at Overton, Glamorgan, United Kingdom. Five of the thirteen people on board reached shore in a boat, the rest were rescued by rocket apparatus.
Eleanor	United Kingdom	The paddle steamer was driven ashore and wrecked at Leestone Point, Kilkeel, County Down. Her passengers were taken off.
Glasgow	United Kingdom	The ship was abandoned in the Atlantic Ocean. Her crew were rescued by Amicitia (Flag unknown). Glasgow was on a voyage from Pensacola, Florida, United States to Glasgow, Renfrewshire.
Glentruim	United Kingdom	The steamship ran aground at Burntisland, Fife. She was on a voyage from Burntisland to a Mediterranean port.
Mary Bowen	United Kingdom	The ship departed from "Coesaw" for London. No further trace, reported missing.
Peckham	United Kingdom	The schooner was driven ashore 4 nautical miles (7.4 km) south of Scarborough, Yorkshire. Her eleven crew survived. She was on a voyage from Newcastle upon Tyne, Northumberland to Demerara, British Guiana.
Robert Preston	United Kingdom	The ship was driven ashore north of Whitehaven, Cumberland. She was on a voyage from Belfast, County Antrim to Maryport, Cumberland.
Ruperra	United Kingdom	The steamship was driven ashore and wrecked west of Bolt Head, Devon. Her crew reached Hope Cove in the ship's lifeboats. She was on a voyage from Alexandria, Egypt to Hull, Yorkshire.
Telegraph	United Kingdom	The steamship ran aground at Cooley Point, County Louth. Her passengers were taken off. She was salvaged but was deemed beyond economical repair and was scrapped.

== 28 January ==
List of shipwrecks: 28 January 1881
Ship	State	Description
Apollo	United Kingdom	The steam trawler struck a sunken wreck and sank off the Isle of May, Fife. Her crew were rescued by Lass o' Doon (United Kingdom).
Cambronne	France	The steamship was driven ashore at Port Tennant, Glamorgan, United Kingdom. She was on a voyage from Dieppe, Seine-Inférieure to Cardiff, Glamorgan.
Harvest Queen	United Kingdom	The barque was abandoned in the Atlantic Ocean by eight of her ten crew, who were rescued by McLaurin (United States). Harvest Queen was presumed to have foundered that night, but she was observed to founder on 1 February. Both crew aboard were rescued on 31 January by the full-rigged ship Olive S. Southard (United States).
Hugh Taylor	United Kingdom	The steamship was driven ashore in Robin Hoods Bay. She was on a voyage from Arzew, Algeria to Leith, Lothian. She was refloated with the assistance of three tugs on 30 January and taken in to the River Tyne.
Island Belle	United Kingdom	The ship was abandoned off Portpatrick, Wigtownshire. She was on a voyage from Newport, Monmouthshire to Ardrossan, Ayrshire. She came ashore south of Portpatrick and capsized.
William Burkett	United Kingdom	The steamship ran aground in the River Tyne at Walker, Northumberland whilst avoiding a collision with some lighters. She was refloated.

== 29 January ==
List of shipwrecks: 29 January 1881
Ship	State	Description
Carienoch	Sweden	The schooner ran aground on the Scroby Sands, Norfolk, United Kingdom. She was on a voyage from Great Yarmouth, Norfolk to Newcastle upon Tyne, Northumberland, United Kingdom. She was refloated with assistance and taken in to Great Yarmouth.
Carlo	United Kingdom	The steamship ran aground at Bilbao, Spain. She was on a voyage from Bilbao to Newport, Monmouthshire. She was refloated and completed her voyage in a leaky condition.
Don Pedro II	Brazil	The ship was driven ashore at the mouth of the Potomac River. She was on a voyage from Baltimore, Maryland to Rio de Janeiro.
Gipsy	United Kingdom	The fishing trawler foundered off Inchcape, Fife. Her six crew were rescued by the schooner Lass of Doon (United Kingdom).
Ganjam	France	The barque was driven ashore and wrecked at Point Gordewarn, India.
Mortha	Flag unknown	The ship departed from New York, United States for Amsterdam, North Holland, Netherlands. No further trace, reported overdue.
Oriola	United Kingdom	The schooner was driven ashore at Plum Point, Jamaica. Attempts by HMS Contest and HMS Druid (both Royal Navy) over the next two days to refloat her were unsuccessful and she became a wreck.
Siroken	United States	The ship was abandoned in the Atlantic Ocean. Her crew were rescued by the steamship Nith (United Kingdom). Siroken was on a voyage from Baltimore, Maryland to Falmouth, Cornwall, United Kingdom.
Unnamed	France	The floating crane was run into by the steamship Harrington (United Kingdom) at Rouen, Seine-Inférieure, France and sank.

== 30 January ==
List of shipwrecks: 30 January 1881
Ship	State	Description
Blanche	United Kingdom	The barque was driven ashore at Gibraltar. She was on a voyage from Torre del Mar, Spain to Faro, Portugal. She was refloated and towed in to Gibraltar in a leaky condition.
Favorite	Germany	The barque was wrecked at the mouth of the Quillimane River, Africa. Her crew were rescued.
Mary Black	United Kingdom	The ship was abandoned in the Atlantic Ocean (47°44′N 44°00′W). Her crew were rescued by the barque Johannes Foss (Norway). Mary Black was on a voyage from Paraíba, Brazil to the English Channel.
Severn	United Kingdom	The barque collided with the steamship Mayumba (United Kingdom) and sank in the Bay of Biscay with the loss of five of her crew. Survivors were rescued by Mayumba. Severn was on a voyage from Sunderland to Buenos Aires, Argentina.
Unnamed'	Flag unknown	The ship foundered off Walton-on-the-Naze, Essex, United Kingdom.

== 31 January ==
List of shipwrecks: 31 January 1881
Ship	State	Description
Albicore	United Kingdom	The steamship was driven ashore at IJmuiden, North Holland, Netherlands.
Alice Starret	United Kingdom	The brig was driven ashore in the Guadalquivir 10 nautical miles (19 km) from Seville, Spain. She was on a voyage from Hamburg, Germany to Seville.
Bismarck	Flag unknown	The tug was wrecked at Alfândega, Portugal.
Lizzie	United Kingdom	The schooner was abandoned in the Atlantic Ocean. Her crew were rescued by the barque Oliver Emery (United Kingdom). Lizzie was on a voyage from the Newfoundland Colony to Lisbon, Portugal.
Phoenix	Denmark	The steamship was wrecked in Faxe Bay, Iceland. Her crew were rescued.
Roraima	United Kingdom)	The steamship was driven ashore at Shark River, New Jersey, United States. She was on a voyage from Demerara, British Guiana to New York, United States. She was later refloated and taken in to New York.
Thingvalla	Denmark	The steamship struck a sunken rock. She was on a voyage from New York, United States to Copenhagen, Denmark. She put in to Kristiansand.

== Unknown date ==
List of shipwrecks: Unknown date in January 1881
Ship	State	Description
Abraham Lincoln	United States	The ship ran aground at Bermuda. She was on a voyage from Doboy, Georgia to Sunderland, County Durham, United Kingdom. She was refloated nd taken in to Bermuda.
Adirondack	United Kingdom	The steamship caught fire at Bremen, Germany. The fire was extinguished.
Affinity	United Kingdom	The ship was driven ashore at Shotley, Suffolk. She was refloated on 2 February and taken in to Harwich, Essex for repairs.
Alice Lyne	United Kingdom	The ship was abandoned in the Atlantic Ocean. She was on a voyage from Leith, Lothian to the Newfoundland Colony. She was subsequently towed in to Saint John's, Newfoundland Colony.
Allen McDonnell	United Kingdom	The steamship ran aground at Ballyquinton Point, County Down.
Alma	Germany	The ship was driven ashore in the Strait of Malacca. She was on a voyage from Iloilo, Spanish East Indies to the English Channel.
Amati	Italy	The barque was driven ashore at Key West, Florida, United States and was severely damaged. She was on a voyage from Pensacola, Florida to Glasgow, Renfrewshire, United Kingdom.
Amythyst	United Kingdom	The steamship ran aground at Bremen. She was on a voyage from Sulina, United Principalities to Bremen.
Angelina	United Kingdom	The schooner was driven ashore and wrecked at Kastlösa, Öland, Sweden.
Ansom Simpson	United States	The ship was wrecked at Absecom, New Jersey. She was on a voyage from San Domingo to Newport.
Armorique	Liberia	The barque was driven ashore and wrecked at Old Harbour, Jamaica.
Bertha, or Hertha	Flag unknown	The barque ran aground on the Maplin Sand, in the North Sea off the coast of Essex. She was on a voyage from Rotterdam, South Holland, Netherlands to New York, United States. She was refloated and taken in to Gravesend, Kent, United Kingdom.
Bertha	Norway	The ship was lost at Kristiansand. She was on a voyage from St. Ubes, Portugal to Trondheim.
Blanche	United Kingdom	The steamship was driven ashore at Dunkirk, Nord, France.
Blyth	United Kingdom	The steamship ran aground on rocks in Santoria Bay. Her crew survived. She broke in two on 12 January.
Braunschweig	Germany	The steamship ran aground at New Orleans, Louisiana, United States.
Bristol	United Kingdom	The ship was driven ashore at Atlanticville, South Carolina, United States. She was on a voyage from Bristol, Gloucestershire to New York. She was refloated and completed her voyage.
Cebu	(Spain) Spanish East Indies	The steamship sank in the Pasig River.
City of Rotterdam	United Kingdom	The steamship ran aground at the mouth of the Maas. She was refloated and resumed her voyage.
Chinaman	United Kingdom	The barque collided with the steamship Craiglands (United Kingdom) and sank off the Amherst Rocks, in the Yangtze Estuary. All on board survived. Chinaman was on a voyage from Shanghai, China to Nagasaki, Japan.
Commodore	United Kingdom	The schooner foundered in the Bay of Biscay. Her crew were rescued. She was on a voyage from Cardiff, Glamorgan to Vigo, Spain.
Congo	France	The barque was driven ashore at Brownsville, Texas, United States. Her crew were rescued. She was on a voyageb from Bordeaux, Gironde to Santos, Brazil.
Constantia	Spain	The steamship ran aground in the Maas. She was refloated with assistance.
Daniel Steinmann	Belgium	The steamship ran aground on the Nolleplatje, off Vlissingen, Zeeland, Netherlands. She was on a voyage from New York to Antwerp.
David	United Kingdom	The ship was driven ashore at Alexandria, Egypt.
D. W. Hennesey	United Kingdom	The brigantine was abandoned in the Atlantic Ocean with the loss of a crew member. She was on a voyage from Prince Edward Island, Canada to Baltimore, Maryland, United States.
Edward Beck	United Kingdom	The ship was driven ashore at Morwenstow, Cornwall. Her crew were rescued.
Elissa	United Kingdom	The ship was driven ashore and severely damaged at Saint-Malo, Ille-et-Vilaine, France.
Ellida	Flag unknown	The ship was driven ashore and wrecked at Boroen, Norway. She was on a voyage from Pärnu, Russia to Dunkirk.
E. L. Margaret	United Kingdom	The brig ran aground at Cardiff whilst avoiding a collision with the steamship Louise (United Kingdom). She was refloated.
Equador	France	The clipper was lost off "Faraman", Spain with the loss of thirteen crew. She was on a voyage from Iquique, Peru to Marseille, Bouches-du-Rhône.
Erl Konig	Germany	The ship was driven ashore at Key West. She was refloated.
Espervier	France	The barque was driven ashore at Chittagong, India and broke her back. She was refloated and put back to Chittagong.
Express	United Kingdom	The ship was driven ashore at New Brighton, Cheshire. She was refloated.
Fanny	United Kingdom	The ship was wrecked at "Jomako", Netherlands East Indies.
Friendship	United Kingdom	The fishing smack foundered in the North Sea with the loss of all hands.
Galatea	United Kingdom	The steamship struck a sunken rock off Elderslie, Renfrewshire and damaged her propeller.
Gardenia	United Kingdom	The steamship was driven ashore and wrecked at Wyk auf Föhr, Germany. She was on a voyage from Savannah, Georgia, United States to Bremen.
Geestemünde	Germany	The ship was driven ashore at Westhampton, New York. She was on a voyage from Antwerp to New York. She was refloated and taken in to New York.
Georg Freiherr von Vincke	Germany	The ship was abandoned in the North Sea. She was subsequently towed in to Arendal, Norway in a waterlogged condition.
Govino	Flag unknown	The steamship was driven ashore at Gravesend.
G. T. Haendal	Germany	The ship put in to the Falkland Islands on fire and was scuttled at Port William. She was on a voyage from Bremen to Honolulu, Kingdom of Hawaii. She burnt to the waterline and was a total loss.
Gustav	Flag unknown	The ship was driven ashore. She was refloated and taken in to Lillesand, Norway.
Hakon	Sweden	The brig was driven ashore and wrecked at Torekov. She was on a voyage from Hull, Yorkshire, United Kingdom to Malmö.
Happy Return	United Kingdom	The brig was driven ashore at Nantucket, Massachusetts, United States.
Harmonie	United Kingdom	The ship was driven ashore at Mandal, Norway. She was on a voyage from Falkenberg, Sweden to Bo'ness, Lothian.
Haytian	Haiti	The steamship was damaged by ice in the Schuylkill River. She was on a voyage from Haiti to Philadelphia, Pennsylvania, United States. She arrived at Philadelphia waterlogged at the bow.
Helena	United Kingdom	The schooner was abandoned at sea. Her crew were rescued by the barque Amazon (Sweden). Helena was on a voyage from Saint-Malo to Campbeltown, Argyllshire.
Heros	Norway	The full-rigged ship ran aground at Long Island, in the Strait of Sunda. She was on a voyage from Manila, Spanish East Indies to the English Channel. She was refloated and taken in to Batavia, Netherlands East Indies.
Highbury	United Kingdom	The steamship ran aground in the Schuylkill River. She was on a voyage from Philadelphia to Antwerp. She was refloated with the assistance of three tugs and put back to Philadelphia.
Hommo	Flag unknown	The ship was abandoned at sea. Her crew were rescued. She was on a voyage from Christiania, Norway to Groningen, Netherlands.
Iron Duke	United Kingdom	The barque was driven ashore at Dunkirk. She was refloated and taken in to Dunkirk.
James Stewart	United Kingdom	The ship was abandoned in the Atlantic Ocean. Her crew were rescued by W. E. Heard ( Canada). James Stewart was on a voyage from Cádiz, Spain to the Newfoundland Colony.
Jamestown	United States	The ship was abandoned in the Atlantic Ocean (43°06′N 22°00′W). All 27 people on board were rescued by the steamship Ethiopia (United Kingdom). Jamestown was discovered ashore at Hafnir, Iceland on 26 June.
Jessica	United Kingdom	The ship ran aground in the Gironde. She was refloated. She was on a voyage from Akyab, Burma to Bordeaux.
Job Derislab	Flag unknown	The barque was abandoned in the Atlantic Ocean.
Johann Carl	Germany	The barque was driven ashore at Little Popo, Africa. She was plundered by the local inhabitants and was declared a total loss.
John Ellis	United Kingdom	The ship was driven ashore at Cape Charles, Virginia, United States. She was on a voyage from Waterford to the Hampton Roads, Virginia. She was refloated.
John L. Tracey	United States	The ship was abandoned in the Atlantic Ocean before 23 January.
Josephine	United States	The paddle steamer sprang a leak and foundered in the Gulf of Mexico. She was on a voyage from Cuba to New Orleans, Louisiana.
Josie T. Marshall	United States	The ship was driven ashore and wrecked at Amityville, New York.
Journal	United Kingdom	The barque was sunk by ice at Arichat, Nova Scotia. She was on a voyage from Georgetown to Baltimore, Maryland.
Kaffrarian	Cape Colony	The tug was driven ashore at Port Alfred, Cape Colony. She was abandoned as a total loss.
Kate Bousfield	United Kingdom	The brig was driven ashore at Frontignan, Hérault. Her crew were rescued. She was on a voyage from Goole, Yorkshire to Cette.
Kent	United Kingdom	The tug was sunk by ice in the River Trent at Keadby, Lincolnshire. She was declared a total loss.
Kwasind	United Kingdom	The barque was driven ashore north of Cape Charles, Virginia. She was on a voyage from Hamburg to Baltimore.
Lady Tyler	United Kingdom	The steamship ran aground in the Maas. She was refloated with assistance.
L. C. Geneva	United States	The ship was driven ashore "at the Morches". She was refloated and resumed her voyage.
Leetch	Flag unknown	The ship collided with another vessel and was severely damaged. She put back to Newport, Monmouthshire, United Kingdom, where she was condemned.
Licè	Flag unknown	The ship was wrecked.
Lizzie Garder	United Kingdom	The steamship was driven ashore and wrecked between Girvan and Ballantrae, Ayrshire. She was on a voyage from Glasgow to Stranraer, Wigtownshire.
Lord Nelson	United Kingdom	The fishing smack foundered in the North Sea with the loss of all hands.
Lotus, and Philip Fitzpatrick	United Kingdom; United States	The steamship Lotus and the barque Philip Fitzpatrick collided at Pauillac, Gironde, France. Both vessels were severely damaged.
Louisa	Flag unknown	The ship was severely damaged at Honfleur, Manche, France when she heeled over as the tide went out.
Louise	United Kingdom	The steamship ran aground at Cardiff.
Lucknow	United Kingdom	The schooner ran aground on the Pullar Bank. She was refloated and taken in to Spithead, Hampshire.
Luna	France	The ship collided with an icebreaker off Lewes, Delaware, United States and was damaged. She was on a voyage from Havre de Grâce, Seine-Inférieure to Lewes.
Lyna	Flag unknown	The ship was driven ashore at Kristiansand, Norway. She was a total loss.
Maas	Netherlands	The steamship ran aground. She was on a voyage from Rotterdam to New York. She was refloated with assistance.
Macgregor	United Kingdom	The steamship was wrecked at "Kumpari", Ceylon after 5 January. Her crew were rescued. She was on a voyage from Calcutta, India to Marseille.
Machado Segundo	Flag unknown	The ship collided with Summer Cloud (United Kingdom) and was abandoned in the Atlantic Ocean. Machado Segundo came ashore on Madeira on 8 January.
Madre Maria	Austria-Hungary	The barque caught fire at sea. She was beached at Morant Bay, Jamaica where she burnt out. Her crew were rescued.
Maria	Italy	The ship was driven ashore at Vada. Her crew were rescued.
Maria Frederica	Flag unknown	The schooner collided with the brigantine Cupido (Flag unknown) at Paternoster, Cape Colony and was severely damaged.
Maria Sarah	Germany	The barque was wrecked at Manchioneal, Jamaica. She was on a voyage from Brazil to Pensacola, Florida, United States.
Marquis of Lorne	United Kingdom	The ship was driven ashore in the Elbe. She was on a voyage from Hamburg, Germany to Bristol. She was refloated and taken in to Cuxhaven.
Mary	United Kingdom	The schooner was driven ashore at Penmaenmawr, Caernarfonshire and was scuttled.
Mary Ann	United Kingdom	The ship was abandoned at sea. She was on a voyage from Ayr to Boston. She subsequently came ashore at Boston.
Mary Ann	United Kingdom	The ship foundered off Ilfracombe, Devon.
Massachusetts	Flag unknown	The steamship caught fire at Liverpool, Lancashire, United Kingdom. The fire was extinguished.
Matthias	Germany	The galiot was driven ashore at Erwarton, Suffolk.
Maude	United Kingdom	The ship was driven ashore on Holy Island, Anglesey. She was on a voyage from Bremen to Runcorn, Cheshire. She was refloated.
Midas	United Kingdom	The ship was driven ashore near Beaumaris, Anglesey. She was refloated and taken in to Menai Bridge, Caernarfonshire.
Mineta	United Kingdom	The ship ran aground off Dunkirk. She was refloated and taken in to Dunkirk in a leaky condition.
Moderation	United Kingdom	The barque ran aground on the Black Middens, off the mouth of the River Tyne. She was refloated.
Mountain Ash	United Kingdom	The barque was driven ashore at Cape Town, Cape Colony. She was on a voyage from Galle, Ceylon to Marseille. She was refloated and found to be severely leaky.
Netley Abbey	United Kingdom	The ship ran aground at Antwerp. She was on a voyage from Antwerp to Dartmouth, Devon. She was refloated and resumed her voyage, arriving at Dartmouth on 25 January.
Nora Creina	United Kingdom	The smack sank off the Lemon and Owers Sandbank, in the North Sea. Her six crew reached the Lemon Lightship ( Trinity House ), from where they were rescued by the smack Rowena (United Kingdom).
Notre Dame de la Garde	France	The ship collided with L. C. K. (Flag unknown) and was severely damaged.
Nynhalden	Netherlands	The brig was lost off "Terre Nègre", Gironde, France. Her crew were rescued.
Ollivier Madeleine	France	The ship was driven ashore near Le Palais, Morbihan.
Our Boys	United Kingdom	The ship caught fire and sank off Shoeburyness, Essex.
Panellinion	Greece	The brig was driven ashore near Ceuta, Spain. She was on a voyage from Varna, Bulgaria to Falmouth, Cornwall, United Kingdom. She was refloated, and was subsequently towed in to Gibraltar in a sinking condition by the steamship Heptarchy (United Kingdom).
Papermaker	United States	The barge was sunk by ice in the Mississippi River at Memphis, Tennessee.
Phœnix	Norway	The barque was driven ashore and wrecked at Minatitlán, Mexico.
Prometheus	Norway	The barque was driven ashore and wrecked at Maassluis, South Holland. Her crew were rescued. She was on a voyage from Porsgrund to Maassluis.
Quail	United Kingdom	The steamship ran aground at Rotterdam. She was on a voyage from Liverpool to Rotterdam.
Renown	United Kingdom	The ship ran aground on the Holm Sand, in the North Sea off the coast of Suffolk. She was refloated with assistance and taken in to Lowestoft, Suffolk.
Resolutionnen	Norway	The brig was abandoned in the North Sea. Her crew were rescued by the steamship Rolf (Denmark). Resolutionnen was on a voyage from Dram to Grangemouth, Stirlingshire, United Kingdom. She was subsequently towed in to South Shields, County Durham, United Kingdom in a waterlogged condition.
Rowland Evans	United States	The ship collided with Mary Eyde (Flag unknown) at Pernambuco, Brazil and was beached.
Sachen	United States	The ship capsized and caught fire at New York. She was severely damaged.
San Francisco de Paul	Spain	The brigantine foundered off Cape Finisterre. Her crew were rescued by the schooner Dahomey (Germany). San Francisco de Paul was on a voyage from Torrevieja to A Coruña.
Selina	United Kingdom	The steam trawler struck rocks and was beached at Cullercoats, Northumberland.
Senior	United Kingdom	The steamship ran aground in the Maas. She was on a voyage from Bilbao, Spain to Rotterdam. She was refloated with assistance on 1 February.
Siam	United Kingdom	The barque ran aground, capsized, and sank at Barranquilla, United States of Colombia with the loss of five of her crew. She was on a voyage from Cardiff to Barranquilla.
Sirius	Norway	The barque was damaged by ice in the Baltimore River. She was on a voyage from Baltimore, Maryland, United States to Malpas.
Sjofroken	Norway	The barque was abandoned in the Atlantic Ocean before 30 January.
Sly Boots	United Kingdom	The fishing trawler was run down by the steamship Compton (United States) on or before 7 January. All five crew were drowned.
Souerah	France	The steamship was driven ashore and wrecked at Casablanca, Morocco before 24 January. She was on a voyage from the Canary Islands to Marseille.
Spring	United Kingdom	The ship caught fire and was severely damaged at London.
Stanbo	Norway	The barque was severely damaged by ice in the Schuylkill River. She was on a voyage from Philadelphia to Queenstown, County Cork, United Kingdom. She put back to Philadelphia for repairs.
Success	United Kingdom	The ship was driven ashore on Burr Island, County Down. Her crew survived. She was on a voyage from Dublin to Maryport, Cumberland.
Tarsus	United Kingdom	The barque was driven ashore and wrecked near Minehead, Somerset. Her crew were rescued. Her ten crew survived.
Umvoti	United Kingdom	The ship collided with Tweedsdale (United Kingdom) at Madras, India and was severely damaged.
Vesta	Germany	The barque ran aground at Galveston, Texas, United States and sprang a severe leak. She was on a voyage from Galveston to Bremen.
Victor Hamille	France	The lugger was driven ashore. She was refloated and towed in to Newhaven, Sussex, United Kingdom.
Village Flower	United Kingdom	The ship ran aground at Harwich. She was on a voyage from Gainsborough, Lincolnshire to Woodbridge, Suffolk.
Ville de Brest	France	The steamship was driven ashore 20 nautical miles (37 km) from Havana, Cuba. She was on a voyage from Saint-Nazaire, Loire-Inférieure to Havana. She was refloated and taken in to Havana.
West Stanley	United Kingdom	The steamship ran aground. She was on a voyage from Galvestonto Reval, Russia. She was refloated in May, and was towed in to Farsund, Norway on 9 May by the steamships Hero, Neptun and Poseidon (all Norway).
Widdington	United Kingdom	The steamship collided with the steamship Oanima (United States) and was beached at Halifax, Nova Scotia, Canada. Widdington was on a voyage from New Orleans to Hamburg.
W. T. Harward	United States	The ship was driven ashore near the Delaware Breakwater.
Young Harry	United Kingdom	The fishing lugger was run into by the lugger Albion (United Kingdom) and sank in the North Sea. Her crew were rescued by Albion.
Zephyr	United Kingdom	The ship ran aground on the Blythe Sands, in the Thames Estuary. She was on a voyage from London to Great Yarmouth, Norfolk. She was refloated and towed back to London.
43	United States	The barge was holed by ice and sank at Memphis.
Unnamed	France	The barque was driven ashore at the South Foreland, Kent.
Unnamed	France	The steamship was driven ashore at Navarino, Greece.
Unnamed	France	The lighter sank at Dunkirk.
Unnamed	United Kingdom	The steam trawler was lost at South Shields.
