= Blockade of Callao =

Military operation during Salpeter War

- Part of the War of the Pacific
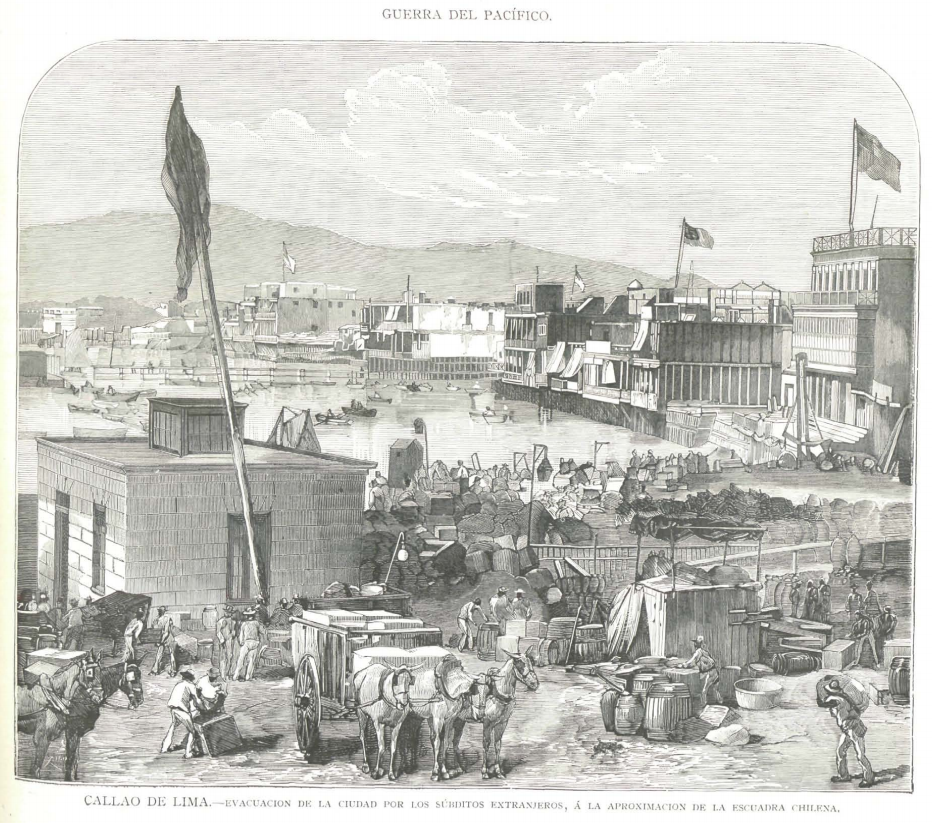
- An image published on 30 January 1881 by La Ilustración Española y Americana shows Civilians leaving the port before the shelling. Several US flags have been raised to mark neutral soil.
Date	10 April 1880 – 18 January 1881
Location	Port of Callao 12°03′S 77°08′W
Result	Chilean victory

Belligerents
Chile	Peru

Commanders and leaders
(Chile) Manuel Baquedano	(Peru) Germán Astete

Strength
1 ironclad 2 torpedo boats 3 gunboats 1 transport	1 monitor 2 torpedo boats 1 armed tugboat 1 training ship 1 submarine

Casualties and losses
1 torpedo boat 1 gunboat 1 transport	1 monitor 2 torpedo boats 1 armed tugboat 1 training ship 1 submarine
- Location within Lima Blockade of Callao (Peru) Blockade of Callao (South America)

The Blockade of Callao was a military operation that occurred during the War of the Pacific or the Salitre War and that consisted of the Chilean squadron preventing the entry of ships to the port of Callao and the neighboring coves between 10 April 1880 and 17 January 1881.

== Blockade ==
Commencing on 10 April 1880, the Chilean Navy fleet began a light blockade of the Peruvian port of Callao. The Chilean fleet would slowly grow as additional ships became available from other regions of the campaign. Likewise, the Peruvian Navy would arm local vessels as equipment allowed.

Several times over the year that the blockade was effected, the Chilean fleet would sortie and bombard the city. This was frequently in response to a Peruvian attack, such as the repeated successful deployment of disguised floating bombs.

== Scuttling of the Peruvian fleet ==
After the successful attacks on the Lima suburbs of San Juan and Miraflores, it became apparent that the city was going to fall to the advancing Chilean Army. During the night of 16 January 1881, after the defeat of the Peruvian Army in the battles of San Juan and Miraflores, the Secretary of the Navy, Captain Manuel Villar, ordered the destruction of port defences and the remaining ships of the Peruvian Navy to prevent their capture by Chilean troops. This order was executed by the captains Germán Astete and Manuel Villavisencio during the dawn of 17 January 1881. Among the ships scuttled were the last Peruvian ironclad, the monitor Atahualpa, the corvette Unión, the training ship Apurímac, as well as Peru's first submarine, Toro Submarino.

=== Ships scuttled ===
The Peruvian ships scuttled by their crew to prevent their capture, included:

Name	Type	Fate
Apurímac	pontoon (ex-frigate)	
Atahualpa	monitor	Salvaged 1881
Chalaco	steamship transport	
Limeña	steamship transport	
Loa	training ship	
Oroya	steamship transport	
República	torpedo boat	
Rímac	steamship transport	Salvaged June 1881
Talismán	steamship transport	
Toro Submarino	submarine	
Unión	corvette	

== Surrender ==
Callao surrendered on 18 January 1881, the day after the fleet was scuttled.
