= Luis Germán Astete =

Peruvian Navy officer and politician (1832–1883

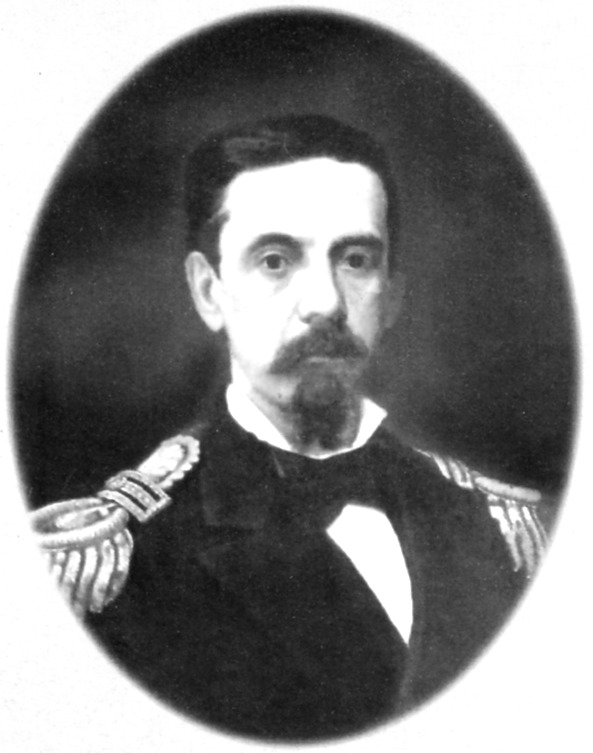
- Photograph of Astete
- Born: Luis José Germán Astete Fernández de Paredes; 28 May 1832; Lima, Peru
- Died: 10 July 1883 (aged 51); Huamachuco, Peru
- Spouse: Peregrina Guerrero y Álvarez Calderón
- Children: 6
- Relatives: Pedro de Astete Núñez (father); María Manuela Fernández de Paredes y Noriega (mother)
- Military career
- Allegiance: Peru
- Branch: Peruvian Navy
- Service years: 1853–1883
- Rank: Captain
- Commands: Huáscar
- Conflicts: Chincha Islands War; Battle of Callao; Battle of Pacocha; War of the Pacific; Bombardment of Callao; Battle of San Juan and Chorrillos; Battle of Miraflores; Breña campaign; Battle of Marcavalle; Battle of La Concepción; Battle of Huamachuco †

Captain Luis Germán Astete (28 May 1832 – 10 July 1883) was a Peruvian Navy officer and politician who served in the Chincha Islands War and War of the Pacific. He was killed in action at the Battle of Huamachuco.

== Biography ==
He was the son of Pedro de Astete Núñez and María Manuela Fernández de Paredes y Noriega (granddaughter of the Marquises of Salinas). Baptized in the Government Palace, his godfather was Marshal Gamarra, president of the Republic. He studied at the Real Convictorio de San Carlos in Lima. Then he entered as a midshipman at the Military School in 1850, and that same year he embarked on the frigate Algerie and later on the Serieuse, on which he was sent to France.

In 1853, with the rank of ensign, he joined the crew of the newly built frigate Amazonas, on his trip to Peru from England. In 1854 he was appointed commander of the schooner Hector, but he mutinied along with the political prisoners he had on board, who were banished to Mexico. Captured by the Vigilante, he was prosecuted and banished to Chile. Soon he returned to Peru, residing in Arequipa, where he remained until the Battle of La Palma, victory of the rebels that put an end to the government of José Rufino Echenique, in early 1855. In 1856, he married Peregrina Guerrero y Álvarez Calderón, niece of the Count of Álvarez Calderón. The couple had six children.

He ascended to second lieutenant in March 1855, and served on the ships Liberty and Guise, being discharged again in January 1857 due to his support for General Manuel Ignacio de Vivanco during the Peruvian Civil War of 1856–1858. Elected deputy for Huaraz in the legislature of 1860–1864, he resigned his promotion to corvette captain, considering it incompatible with his political function. On board the steamship Sachaca, he participated in the Battle of Callao on 2 May 1866 against the Spanish Squadron of the Pacific.

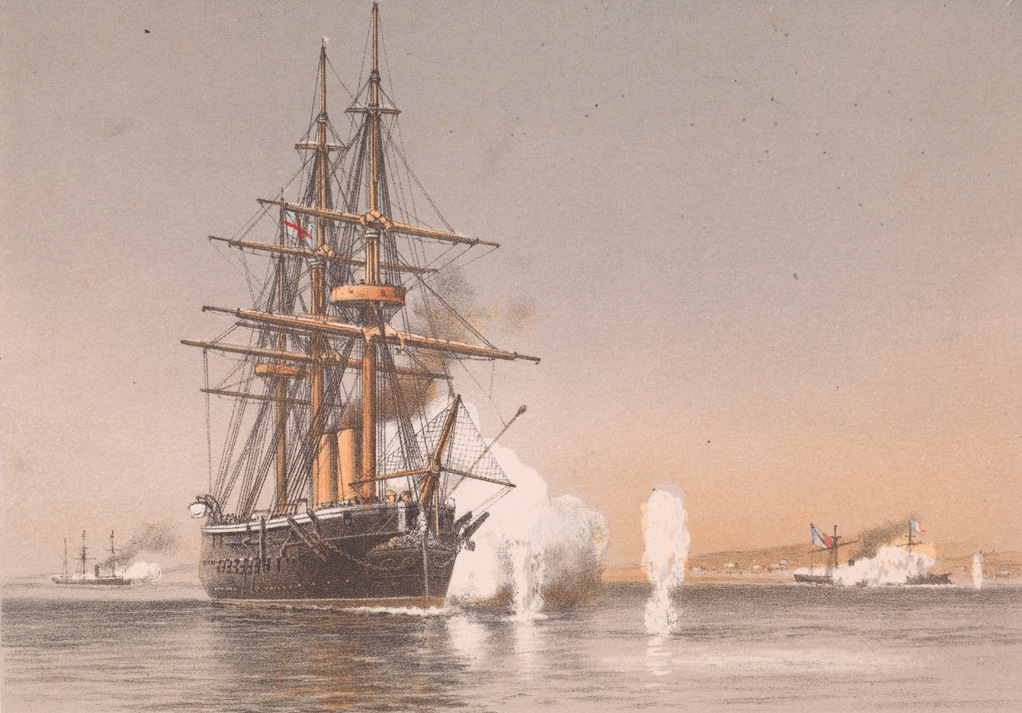
Huáscar (right) under Astete at the Battle of Pacocha

Once the constitutional government was restored in 1868, he was promoted to frigate captain. In 1871 he obtained his indefinite license, and in that state, he had active participation in the uprising in favor of Nicolás de Piérola against President Mariano Ignacio Prado. Then he took command of the ironclad Huáscar, on board which he was appointed commander of the National Regenerative Squadron. In that position, he faced the Royal Navy warships HMS Shah and HMS Amethyst in the Battle of Pacocha on 29 May 1877. After this battle, which ended inconclusively, the rebels surrendered in Iquique to the forces loyal to Prado.

At the outbreak of the War of the Pacific, and already with the rank of captain, he was commissioned to acquire weapons and a ship in the United States, a task that was interrupted due to political swings. Back to Peru, he was named prefect of Callao and commander of the batteries during the defense of the port before the blockade of the Chilean squadron. He fought in the battles of San Juan and Chorrillos and Miraflores, and in January 1881 ordered the scuttling of several warships as well as Peru's first submarine, Toro Submarino, to prevent them from falling into Chilean hands.

After Lima was occupied by Chilean forces, he marched to the Sierra and was elected deputy from Alto Amazonas to the National Assembly meeting in Ayacucho, but he did not join it and preferred to take up arms, joining the Breña campaign led by Andrés Avelino Cáceres. He participated in the battles of Marcavalle and La Concepción. At the Battle of Huamachuco he had under his command the 4th Army Division of the Center and died as a result of a shot that pierced his forehead.

== Bibliography ==
- Basadre Grohmann, Jorge (2005). Historia de la República del Perú (1822 - 1933) (in Spanish). Vol. 9. Lima: Empresa Editora El Comercio S. A. ISBN 9972-205-71-1.
- Ortiz Sotelo, Jorge; Castañeda Martos, Alicia (2007). Diccionario Biográfico Marítimo Peruano (in Spanish). Lima: Asociación de Historia Marítima y Naval Iberoamericana. ISBN 978-9972-877-06-3.
- Tauro del Pino, Alberto (2001). Enciclopedia Ilustrada del Perú (in Spanish). Vol. 2 (3rd ed.). Lima: PEISA. ISBN 9972-40-151-0.
