= Talismán (ship) =

History

Peru
- Name: Talismán
- Builder: Blackwood & Gordon, Glasgow, Scotland
- Launched: 13 January 1872
- Commissioned: 1873
- Fate: Scuttled, 1881

General characteristics
- Type: Ship transport
- Displacement: 310 long tons (315 t)
- Length: 170 feet
- Beam: 23 feet
- Draught: 10 feet
- Speed: 12 knots
- Complement: 80
- Armament: 4 × 12-pounder Armstrong guns

BAP Talismán was an iron hull ship transport of the Peruvian Navy built in Glasgow. During the War of the Pacific (1879–1883) Talismán was one of several ships that supplied Peru with war material that arrived from the United States, Europe and Costa Rica to Panama. With the blockade of Callao and after the defeats at the battle of San Juan and Chorrillos and the battle of Miraflores, the ship was sunk by its own crew with the rest of the Peruvian fleet on 17 January 1881, to avoid its capture by Chilean troops, before the imminent occupation of Lima.
