= Jamestown (ship) =

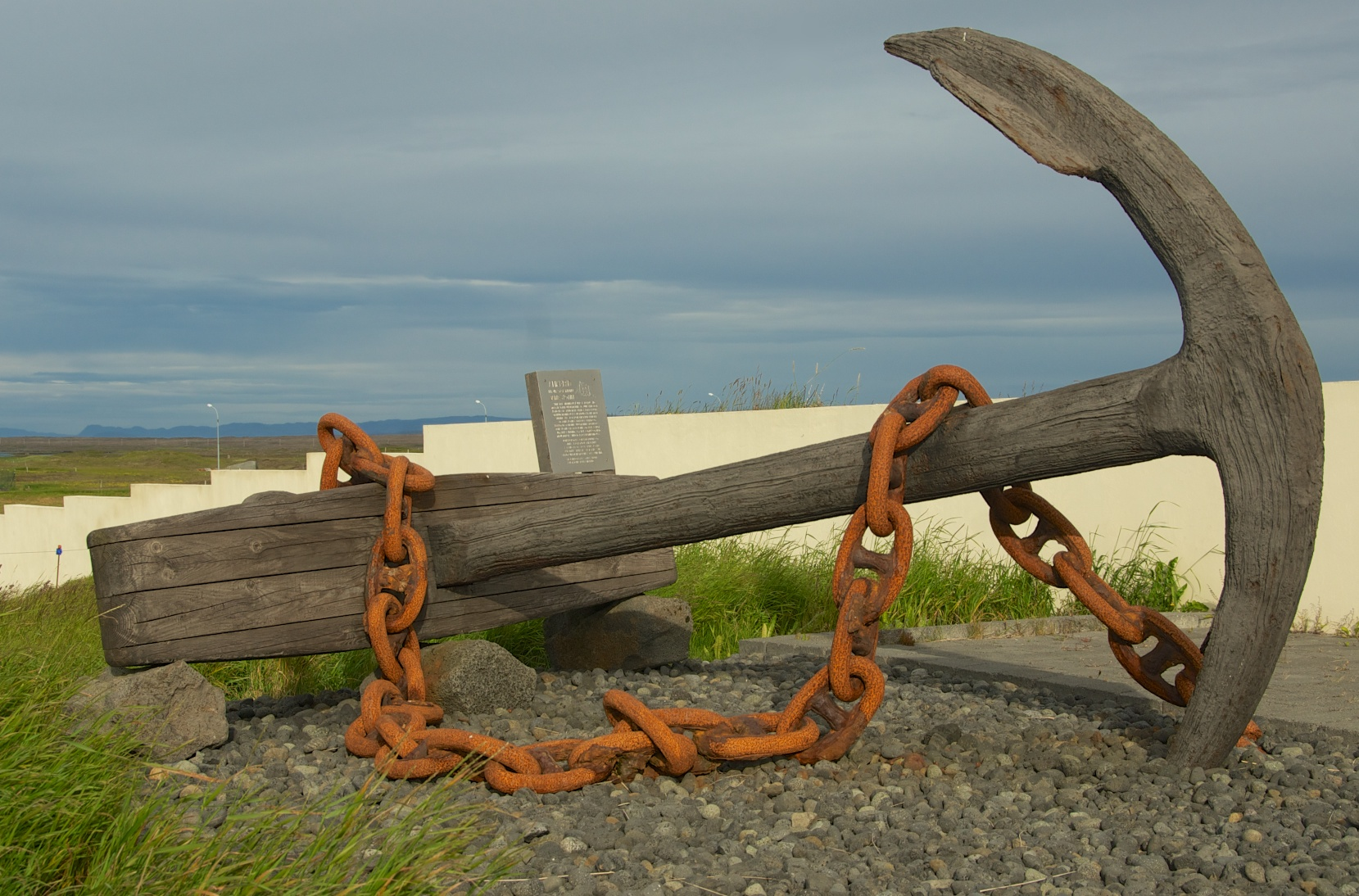
- The anchor of the Jamestown in Hafnir, Iceland

History

United States
- Name: Jamestown
- Owner: James M. Hagar
- Launched: November 1879
- Fate: Wrecked 26 June 1881

General characteristics
- Type: Sailing ship
- Tons burthen: 1889 (bm)
- Length: 207 ft 0 in (63.09 m) (overall);
- Beam: 40 ft 6 in (12.34 m)
- Depth of hold: 28 ft 9 in (8.76 m)

The Jamestown was a large sailing ship which was abandoned and ran aground near the Icelandic village of Hafnir on 26 June 1881.

== History ==
The keel was laid in Richmond, Maine. She was registered there in 1880 after having been launched in November 1879.

== Abandonment ==
The Jamestown left Maine on 10 November, 1880, bound for Liverpool carrying a cargo of high-quality lumber. No sooner was the ship out of port than four of the crew jumped ship, and Captain William E. Whitmore had to find replacements. Then a windlass broke and the ship had to stop in Eastport, Maine for repairs. Finally underway across the Atlantic in early December, the ship encountered heavy seas and the rudder was torn away. After being battered by the seas for several weeks, the captain and crew were rescued by the Anchor Line steamer Ethiopia and left the Jamestown to drift at 43.10°N 22°W. In total, 27 people were rescued, including the captain's wife and child.

The crew arrived safely in Glasgow on 16 February 1881, but their ship didn't reach its final resting place for another four months. On the morning of 26 June, residents of Hafnir woke to find that the enormous vessel had run aground the night before. The cargo of timber was particularly valuable in Iceland, which suffered almost complete deforestation in the several hundred years following the initial Norse settlement in the 9th century. As such, the cargo was unloaded and one third of it was reserved for those who had participated in the salvage operation. The rest was auctioned off, bringing in about DKK 10,000. This is equivalent to US$62,000 in 2012 dollars.

== Aftermath ==
In October 1881, the wreck of the Jamestown was visited by George H. Wadleigh, Commander of the USS Alliance. He wrote a report to the United States Navy explaining the ship's location and condition. The Alliance was passing through Iceland on its way to look for survivors from the ill-fated Jeannette expedition which had also been wrecked that June.
