= Chilean transport Rímac =

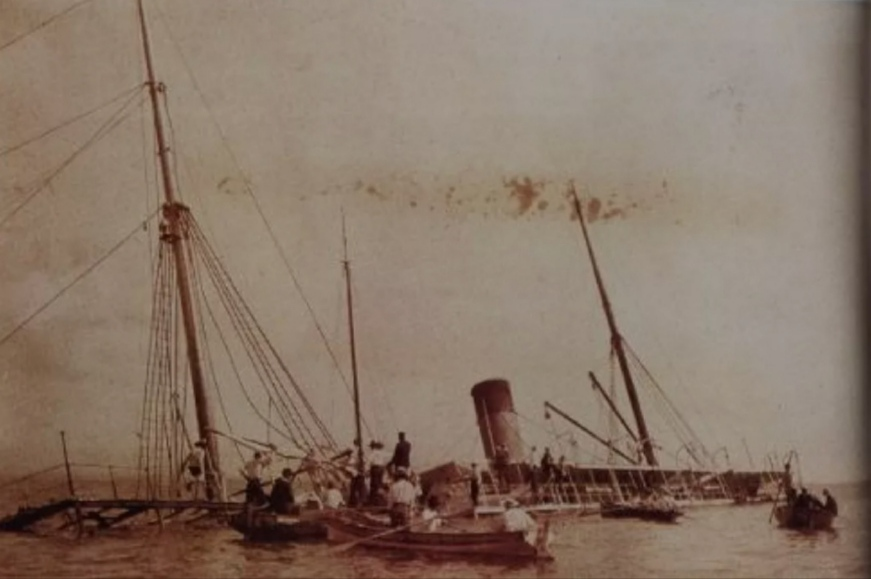
- The sinking of Lautaro, formerly Rímac off Panama City in January 20, 1902

History

Compañía Sudamericana de Vapores
- Name: Rímac
- Namesake: Rímac river
- Operator: Compañía Sudamericana de Vapores
- Builder: R. & J. Evans & Co. Liverpool
- Yard number: 54
- Launched: November 16 1872
- Commissioned: 2 April 1874
- Fate: Lent to Chilean Navy in May 1879

Chile
- Name: Rímac
- Commissioned: May 1879
- Fate: Captured by the Peruvian Navy on 23 July 1879

Perú
- Name: Rímac
- Commissioned: 23 July 1879
- Fate: Scuttled on 17 January 1881

Compañía Sudamericana de Vapores
- Name: Rímac
- Operator: Compañía Sudamericana de Vapores
- Completed: Ship refloated in June 1881 by Chilean government
- Acquired: $ 36,000 (auctioned)
- Renamed: Lautaro on 5 September 1882
- Fate: lent to Conservative Party in Colombian Civil war 1902

Colombia
- Name: Lautaro
- Namesake: Lautaro
- Fate: Sunk off Panama City on 20 January 1902

General characteristics
- Displacement: 1.805 tons. gruesas. 1.227 tons.registro
- Length: 88.93 metres (291 ft 9 in)
- Installed power: 340 hp (250 kW)
- Propulsion: compound inverted built by Fawcett, Preston & Co., Liverpool
- Speed: 13 knots (24 km/h; 15 mph)
- Armament: 4 guns a 32 lbs

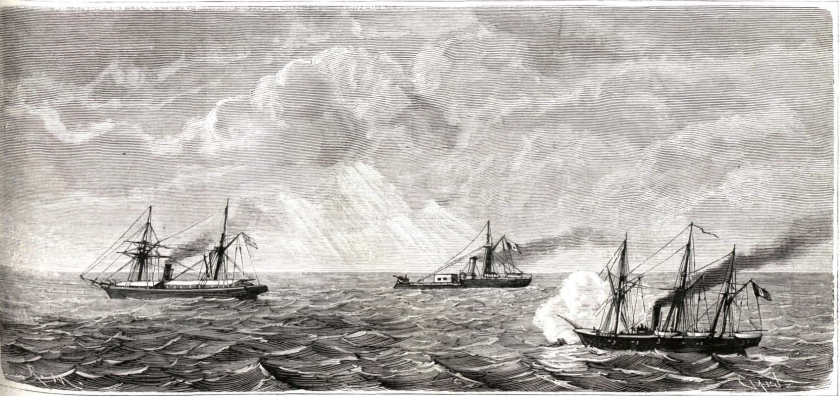
The Unión and Huáscar captures transport Rímac on the War of the Pacific.

Rímac was a steamer involved in decisive actions of the War of the Pacific (1879–1884) and Thousand Days' War (1899–1902).

After construction of the ship in the United Kingdom in 1872, she was purchased by the Compañía Sudamericana de Vapores. However, she was chartered to the White Star Line immediately for their South American route, and departed on her maiden voyage on April 27th 1873, from Liverpool to Valparaíso. She departed on her final White Star voyage on October 27th of the same year, before returning to her original owners.

On 5 May 1874 the Chilean government issued a subvention program under which Chilean enterprises supplied Navy with materiel, called "Convenio de subvención." At the beginning of the war and under this agreement Rímac was handed over to the Chilean Navy, together with the ships Loa and Itata.

In May 1879 she towed Covadonga to Antofagasta after the Battle of Punta Gruesa.

In June 1879 the Peruvian ironclad Huáscar captured Rímac with 260 men of a cavalry regiment, weapons and ammunition. This loss caused riots in Santiago and led to the resignation of the Minister of National Defense, Basilio Urrutia Vásquez, and the commander-in-chief of the Chilean Navy, Juan Williams Rebolledo.

After the defeat of the Peruvian Army in the battles of San Juan and Miraflores, the Secretary of the Navy, Captain Manuel Villar, during the night of 16 January 1881 ordered the destruction of the port defenses and the remaining ships of the Peruvian Navy, including Rímac, to prevent their (re-)capture by the Chilean troops. The order was executed by the captains Luis Germán Astete and Manuel Villavicencio during the dawn of 17 January 1881. But a few months later, in June 1881 she was refloated and auctioned off to CSAV (again) for $36,000.

During the Thousand Days' War in Colombia, Rímac, then renamed Lautaro, was lent to the Conservative Party; she was sunk off Panama City on 20 January 1902, fighting against Admiral Padilla of the Liberal Party.

== See also ==
- List of decommissioned ships of the Chilean Navy
