= Toro Submarino =

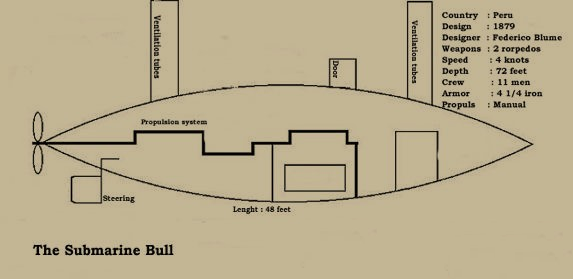
- Sketch as appears in some history books

History

Peru
- Name: Toro Submarino
- Laid down: 1879
- Launched: 1879
- Fate: Scuttled January 17, 1881

General characteristics
- Type: Submarine
- Displacement: 7.5 tons
- Length: 48 ft (15 m)
- Beam: 7 ft (2.1 m)
- Propulsion: 1 × triple blade propeller; Otto-type engine; Ability to toggle to manual mode.
- Speed: 4 knots (7.4 km/h; 4.6 mph) (submerged)
- Complement: 1 officer, 10 enlisted
- Armament: 02 torpedo or 04 naval mines

Toro Submarino (lit. "Submarine Bull") was a Peruvian submarine developed during the War of the Pacific in 1879. It is considered the first operational submarine or submersible in Latin America. Being fully operational, waiting for its opportunity to attack during the Blockade of Callao, it was scuttled early on 17 January 1881, to avoid its capture by Chilean troops, before the imminent occupation of Lima.

== Development ==
In 1864, a civil engineer of Peruvian nationality, born to a German father and Venezuelan mother, Federico Blume Othon (1831–1901), developed the design of the first submarine for the Peruvian Navy. Blume who participated in the construction of railroads in Peru, presented his idea after the Spanish Pacific squadron occupied the Chincha Islands during the Chincha Islands War. His purpose was to create a device that could confront, with minimum risk, the powerful enemy fleet. The result was Toro Submarino (Submarine Bull). It was a revolutionary design for the ships of those days.

She floated and could dive by opening the seacock and filling the ballast tanks. It could also renew the air being submerged using the principle of the snorkel. The war with Spain however came to an end in 1866, and the submarine was not built.

During the Pacific War with Chile, Blume once again offered his services to the Peruvian Navy, presenting an improved version of his 1864 submarine. The engineer started to work on his machine in June 1879, only two months after the declaration of war, financing the project with his own resources. The work was carried out in secrecy during four months at a factory property of the Piura–Paita Northern Railroad. The submarine, a 48-foot-long (15 m) cylindrical, 1/4-inch-thick (6.4 mm) iron boiler, bound together by iron strips and rivets, could be operated manually by eight men out of a total crew of eleven who, at the same time, could move the air fans and the water pump. The ventilation tubes were made of brass, and they could be raised or lowered through a special device. Ship instrumentation included internal pressure gauges, depth meter and ballast tank water level.

On October 14, 1879, Blume, together with his son and eight railroad workers, started testing the submarine off the coast of Paita and proved that the submarine could reach incredible results: a depth of 12 ft (3.7 m) with ventilation system and a maximum speed of 3 knots (5.6 km/h; 3.5 mph). Blume perfected the ship, making 18 additional hour-plus dives over the next 24 days, achieving a maximum dive of 72 feet (22 meters) without issue.

News about the amazing weapon reached Supreme Director Nicolás de Piérola, who became very enthusiastic about the idea of using it against the Chilean Navy, so preparations were made to show her capability to the authorities.

== Service ==
The submarine was brought to Callao under the utmost secrecy, hidden in the transport Limeña. In July 1880, Toro Submarino made its first official submersion in presence of the Peruvian Minister of War and Marine Manuel de Mendiburu. During these maneuvers, the submarine remained submerged for 30 minutes without suffering any drawback, proving that it could be used as a reliable weapons platform; the Minister was very impressed. His report to the government about the capabilities of the submarine was favorable, and a decision was made to use it against Chilean warships.

The Peruvian Government appointed a board of mariners and engineers to study improvements to the invention and allocated a fund of S/. 10,000 for the construction of another improved submersible, larger and with superior design characteristics, intending to eliminate the 2 air tubes, using compressed air for the crew to breathe while immersed and eliminating one of the turrets. Thus, an empty keel was added to the hull design in the bow along with an Otto gasoline engine in the stern to give it greater forward speed and greater surface range. The construction of the new submarine was advanced in the Factory of Juan V. Juliá.

However, the adverse development of the war for Peru and the imminent beginning of the Blockade of Callao in 1880, made the Marina de Guerra del Perú order its use and will prepare the "Toro Submarine". The improvement works were carried out in the es: Factoría Naval de Bellavista, the 2 turrets were replaced by only a central one, the ventilation tubes were removed, a small steam engine was adapted to the stern and the torpedoes type Lay or up to 04 naval mines of 10 pounds of dynamite each and time controller that adhered to the cases of an enemy ship. Its main objective would be to advance at night and attack of the enemy ironclad frigates (Almirante Cochrane or Blanco Encalada), that prowled the bay of Callao.

In the first opportunity where the two Chilean ironclad frigates were anchored near the San Lorenzo Island, the attack was prepared, the Toro was already armed and submerged, but the forces Chilean were warned by their spies: "The Peruvians are preparing an attack with a very powerful secret weapon." This warning caused the Chilean squadron to move from its anchorages to the south, with the consequence that the mission was aborted. Since that, Chilean ships would take the precaution of not hovering nearby to avoid attacks with mines or torpedoes.

On January 17, 1881, after the Battle of Miraflores and at the brink of the occupation of the Peruvian capital, Blume's submarine was scuttled with the other ships of the Peruvian fleet to avoid capture by the enemy. The first Peruvian submarine was sunk in front of the Fleteros dock, today Plaza Grau del Callao.

Its crew list included midshipman Manuel Elías Bonnemaison, a survivor of the monitor Huáscar in the Battle of Angamos, as well as a young composer Jose M. Valle Riestra who enrolled voluntarily in the crew.

Some months later, the well-informed Chileans raised it and transferred it to Chile as a war trophy, however, its trail has been definitively lost. Some naval war analysts still believe that, had Toro Submarino been successful, it would have dramatically changed the course of the war in favor of Peru; however, many modern historians have expressed skepticism about this possibility.

== Submarine characteristics ==
This submarine was a cylindrical boiler 48 feet (15 meters) long and 7 wide (2.1 meters). It was built with iron plates 1/4 inch thick, joined by iron strips and rivets and had frame reinforcements every 3 feet.

Blume applied numerous original ideas from the invention of Toro submarine. Its hatches were sealed by rubber friezes and were located in two turrets with visors, its 2 brass ventilation tubes that could be raised and lowered manually by a special device and which had a function of intake and exhaust of air to the interior aided by a blade fan (it was a system that today could be called Snorkel type). The water tank had levels to know the ballast readings during the dive and a piston system to control the ballast in the inversion and surfacing maneuvers. There were also 2 mercury barometers, one measured the internal pressure and the other was connected at one end to the sea, acting as a depth manometer. The propeller had three blades, it was propelled by the muscular work of 8 men on a 7-foot-long shaft, which activated the pair of the propeller, the bilge pump and the fan.

It was manually operated by six to eight men out of a total crew of eleven.

== See also ==
- History of Peru
- History of submarines
