= BAE Morán Valverde =

BAE Morán Valverde may refer to:

- BAE Morán Valverde (D-01), the former American Buckley-class destroyer escort USS Enright (DE-216); acquired by the Ecuadorian Navy in July 1967 as BAE 25 de Julio (E-12); renamed Morán Valverde (D-01), 1975; scrapped 1989
- BAE Morán Valverde (FM-02) (Leander class), the former British Leander-class frigate HMS Danae (F47); commissioned by the Ecuadorian Navy in 1991; decommissioned in 2008
- BAE Morán Valverde (FM-02) (Condell class), the former Chilean Condell-class frigate Almirante Lynch (PFG-07); purchased by the Ecuadorian Navy in 2008 and in active service

== See also ==
- Morán Valverde (disambiguation)
