= Esmeraldas-class corvette =

Corvette class of the Ecuadorian navy

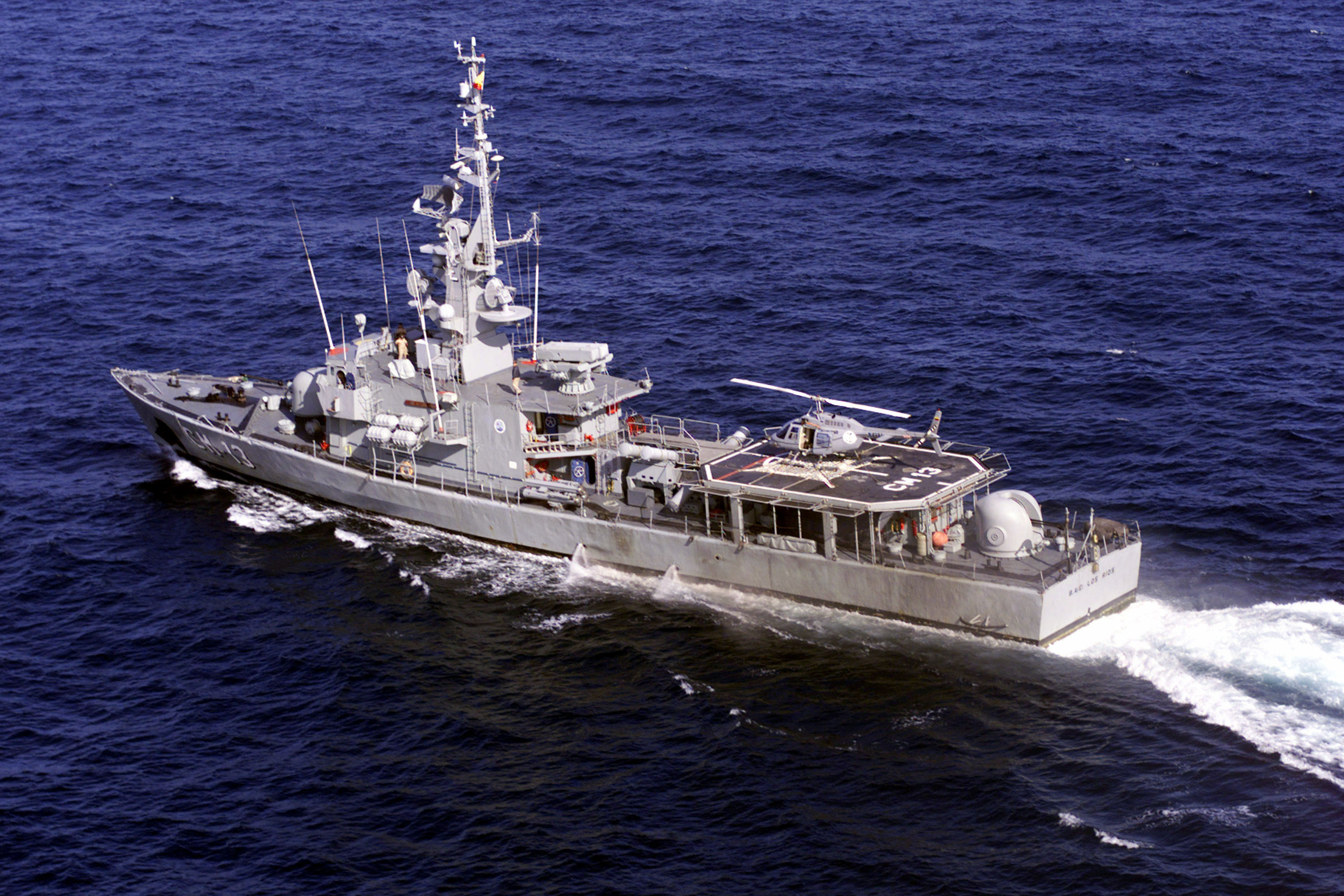
- An Esmeraldas-class corvette training off the coast of Ecuador in 1999.

Class overview
- Name: Esmeraldas class
- Operators: Ecuadorian Navy
- In commission: 1982–present
- Planned: 6
- Completed: 6
- Active: 6

General characteristics
- Type: Corvette
- Displacement: 685 ton
- Length: 57.8 m (189 ft 8 in)
- Beam: 9.3 m (30 ft 6 in)
- Draft: 2.9 m (9 ft 6 in)
- Propulsion: 4 shaft MTU diesel engines, 24,400 hp (18,200 kW)
- Speed: 37 knots (69 km/h; 43 mph)
- Complement: 51
- Armament: 1- Otobreda 76 mm gun; 1 - 40 mm Breda Dardo guns; 1 - Surface-to-air-missile - Selenia Aspide (1 × 4); 6 - MM40 Exocet anti-ship missiles; 2 - Mk32 torpedo launchers
- Aircraft carried: Bell 206 helicopter
- Aviation facilities: Small helipad

The Esmeraldas-class corvettes are a class of corvette in service with the Ecuadorian Navy, built in Italy by Fincantieri, entering service in the early 1980s.

The vessels were built on the Type 550 corvette design, similar to the Assad and Laksamana-class corvettes, built primarily for export.

== Construction and design ==
Six corvettes were ordered by the Ecuadorian Navy from the Italian shipbuilder Cantieri Navali Riuniti (CNR) (now part of Fincantieri) in 1978 or 1979. They were a developed version of CNR's Wadi M'ragh missile corvettes built for Libya in the late 1970s, with more powerful engines giving a higher speed and revised armament and equipment.

The ships are 62.3 m (204 ft 5 in) long overall and 57.8 m (189 ft 8 in) between perpendiculars, with a beam of 9.3 m (30 ft 6 in) and a draft of 2.8 m (9 ft 2 in). Displacement is 685 long tons (696 t) full load. Four MTU MA20 V 956 TB 92 diesel engines rated at a total of 24,400 shp (18,200 kW) maximum power and 22,140 shp (16,510 kW) sustained power drive four propeller shafts, giving a short-term maximum speed of 37 kn (43 mph; 69 km/h) and a sustained speed of 34 kn (39 mph; 63 km/h). The ships have a range of 1,200 nmi (1,400 mi; 2,200 km) at 31 kn (36 mph; 57 km/h), 4,000 nmi (4,600 mi; 7,400 km) at 18 kn (21 mph; 33 km/h) and 4,400 nmi (5,100 mi; 8,100 km) at 14 kn (16 mph; 26 km/h). The ships have a crew of 51.

The ships can carry six Exocet MM40 anti-ship missiles in two triple mounts amidships, with a range of 70 km (38 nmi; 43 mi), while a quadruple launcher for the Albatros surface to air missile system, firing the Aspide missile with a range of 13 km (7.0 nmi; 8.1 mi) is mounted at the aft end of the ship's superstructure, behind the mast. (No reload missiles are carried). An OTO Melara 76 mm Compact gun is fitted forward and a twin Bofors 40 mm anti-aircraft mount is fitted aft. Two triple 324 mm torpedo tubes are fitted, capable of launching Italian Whitehead A244 anti-submarine torpedoes. A helipad is positioned between the Exocet launchers and the Bofors mounts, allowing a Bell 206 helicopter to be operated, although no hangar is provided for the helicopter.

Sensors include a Selenia RAN-10S air/surface search radar, two Selenia Orion 10X fire control radars and a Thomson Sintra Diodon hull-mounted sonar.

== Ships in the class ==
Ecuadorian Navy - Esmeraldas class
Name	Hull number	Shipyard	Laid down	Launched	Commissioned	Status
Esmeraldas	CM-11	CNR Muggiano	27 September 1979	1 October 1980	7 August 1982	In service
Manabí	CM-12	CNR Ancona	19 February 1980	9 February 1981	21 June 1983	In service
Los Rios	CM-13	CNR Muggiano	5 December 1979	27 February 1981	9 October 1983	In service
El Oro	CM-14	CNR Ancona	20 March 1980	9 February 1981	11 December 1983	In service
Galápagos	CM-15	CNR Muggiano	4 December 1980	4 July 1981	26 May 1984	In service
Loja	CM-16	CNR Ancona	24 March 1981	27 February 1982	26 May 1984	In service

== Service history ==
El Oro was badly damaged by a fire on 14 April 1985, and took two years to repair. Two of the ships had their torpedo tubes removed for transfer to the two Leander-class frigates purchased from the British Royal Navy in 1991 (BAE Presidente Eloy Alfaro and BAE Morán Valverde). It was planned to upgrade the ships' combat and fire control systems in 1993–1994, but a lack of funds prevented these changes.

Three of the vessels of the class (Los Rios, Manabí and Loja) were refitted to extend their life by Astinave, being re-delivered in 2017–2018. Changes included fitting a locally developed combat management system called Orion.
