= Morán Valverde =

Morán Valverde may refer to:

- Rafael Morán Valverde, an officer of the Ecuadorian Navy, commander of ship Calderón in the Ecuadorian–Peruvian War
- BAE Morán Valverde, the name of several ships
- Morán Valverde station on the Quito Metro
