= Condell =

Condell may refer to:

- Almirante Condell, the name of several Chilean Navy ships
- Condell Park, suburb In Sydney, Australia
- Henry Condell, actor in Shakespeare's company
- Henry Condell (mayor), first mayor of Melbourne
- Pat Condell, English comedian promoting the cause of atheism

== See also ==
- Saint-Laurent-de-Condel, village in Normandy
