= F47 =

F47 may refer to:

== Aircraft ==
- Boeing F-47, an upcoming American 6th generation air-superiority fighter aircraft
- Republic P-47 Thunderbolt (post-WWII designation), an American fighter aircraft

== Ships ==
- Brazilian frigate Dodsworth (F47), a Type 22 frigate of the Brazilian Navy
- HMS Danae (F47), a Leander-class frigate of the Royal Navy
- INS Shivalik (F47), a Shivalik-class frigate of the Indian Navy
