= La Capitana Shipwreck of 1654 =

Spanish shipwreck

Jesús María de la Limpia Concepción (Spanish: Jesus Maria of the Immaculate Conception), commonly known as "La Capitana," was a 17th-century Spanish treasure galleon of the Spanish South Sea Armada (Armada del Mar del Sur). The ship was lost on October 27, 1654, off the coast of Chanduy, Ecuador. In November 1996, La Capitana was discovered by marine archaeology company, Subamerica Discoveries Inc., under the leadership of Argentine-American couple, Gustavo German Moro and Maria Cristina Moro.

== History ==
In 1640, King Phillip IV of Spain ordered the construction of two new vessels to serve in South Sea Armada. Jesús María de la Limpia Concepción, the larger of the two, was designated as the lead ship, or "Capitana", while the other, the San Francisco Solano, served as its escort, or "Almiranta".

La Capitana was an exceptionally large vessel for its era. Stationed at the port of El Callao, in what is modern-day Peru, it joined a fleet that had played a crucial role in the Spanish Empire's transoceanic trade network. The South Sea Armada's primary mission was to transport gold, silver, and other valuable cargo from Peru, Bolivia, Chile, and Ecuador to the ports of Panama. There, the treasures were unloaded and carried overland across the isthmus to Portobelo and Nombre de Dios, where they were loaded onto Spanish Armada ships for eventual shipment to Spain.

== Sinking ==
In October 1654, during an unannounced inspection ordered by the Viceroy of Peru, a substantial quantity of unregistered silver was discovered in the private cabin of the ship's captain, Captain General Don Baltasar Pardo de Figueroa. Pardo was immediately arrested, and Don Francisco de Sosa was appointed as the new Captain General, with Bernardo de Campos serving as his second-in-command. Campos was also responsible for managing the inventory of silver on board La Capitana. After the Viceroy confirmed that no additional contraband was on board, La Capitana was cleared to depart.

The Spanish treasure fleet departed from the port of El Callao, Peru, consisting of just two galleons: La Capitana Jesús María de la Limpia Concepción, commanded by Admiral Don Francisco de Sosa, and the Almiranta San Francisco Solano. According to the official cargo manifest, La Capitana was transporting 3.2 million pesos' worth of silver (with one peso equivalent to one ounce of silver) at the time of its wreck. However, subsequent records from merchants revealed that the galleon also carried an additional 7 million pesos in contraband silver, bringing the total to an astonishing 10 million pesos. To contextualize, the entire annual silver production in Peru at that time ranged between 6 and 7 million pesos, meaning La Capitana held nearly 1.5 years' worth of Peru's total output for the Spanish Crown.

On the night of October 26, 1654, The ship met disaster when it struck a rock in the middle of the night, three miles off the coast, while attempting to navigate out of the Bay of Guayaquil. In response, the crew fired a cannon to warn the Almiranta of the danger. They spent the night desperately bailing water from the hull but ultimately determined the ship could not be saved. The following day, Admiral de Sosa ordered the galleon to head toward the shore. It was deliberately beached and sunk approximately one mile off the coast near a small, horseshoe-shaped cove in a bid to salvage its cargo more easily.

== Discovery ==
In 1993, SubAmerica Discoveries, Inc., based in Reston, Virginia, applied for, and was eventually granted, a permit to search for and salvage La Capitana. After several unsuccessful attempts, the wreck was finally located by diver Robert McClung. The breakthrough came when a local fisherman captured a small majolica dish in his net, leading to the discovery of the galleon precisely “one cuadra from Los Negros” (approximately 400 yards due east of the Negritos rock formation, as it is known today).

In 1997, a consortium of companies joined forces to excavate the site. SubAmerica Discoveries partnered with Underwater Salvage Inc., a local Ecuadorian firm led by Gloria de Vinueza. They enlisted the vessel R/V Explorer and its owner, Don Mackay, along with a team of professional specialists from the United States. The crew included local Ecuadorian divers Vicente Arcos and Vicente Parrales, with security and logistical support provided by the Ecuadorian Navy.

Recovered artifacts were taken to a conservation lab established at an Ecuadorian naval base in Salinas, Ecuador for preservation. The excavation yielded an extraordinary trove of treasures, including over 20,000 silver coins, several silver bars, numerous majolica plates, and a few gold items such as a stunning gold cross and the ship's pilot compass.

In 1999, after the artifacts were conserved, they were transferred to the Central Bank in Guayaquil, where they were divided between SubAmerica Discoveries and the Ecuadorian government. The government retained the right to select the portion it deemed most valuable. SubAmerica subsequently auctioned some of its share of the recovered items.
