= Chilean ship Almirante Condell =

Several ships of the Chilean Navy have been named Almirante Condell after Admiral Carlos Condell (1846–1912), hero of the Battle of Punta Gruesa during the War of the Pacific:

- Chilean torpedo gunboat Almirante Condell (1891), (1891–1919), later renamed Talcahuano, an Almirante Lynch-class torpedo gunboat
- Chilean destroyer Almirante Condell, an Almirante Lynch-class destroyer, launched in 1912, and decommissioned in 1935
- Chilean frigate Almirante Condell (PFG-06), a Condell-class frigate, launched in 1972, decommissioned in 2007, and sold to Ecuador in 2008
- Chilean frigate Almirante Condell (FF-06), a Type 23 frigate, the former HMS Marlborough (F233), commissioned into the Chilean Navy in 2008
