= HMS Penelope (F127) =

Leander-class frigate, launched 1962

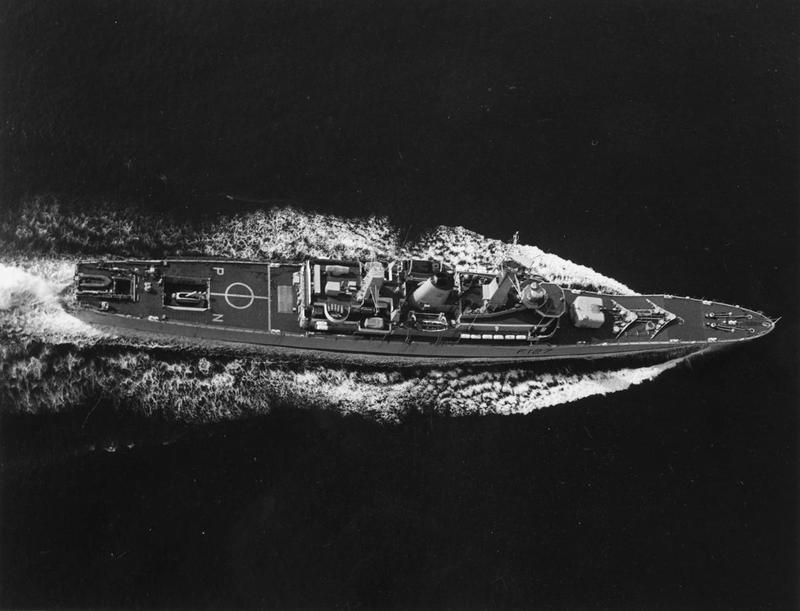
- Aerial view of Penelope in her original configuration, 1970

History

United Kingdom
- Name: HMS Penelope
- Namesake: Penelope
- Operator: Royal Navy
- Builder: Vickers-Armstrongs (Shipbuilders) Ltd, Newcastle
- Laid down: 14 March 1961
- Launched: 17 August 1962
- Commissioned: 31 October 1963
- Decommissioned: 1991
- Identification: Pennant number: F127
- Fate: Sold to Ecuador, 1991

Ecuador
- Name: Presidente Eloy Alfaro
- Namesake: Eloy Alfaro
- Operator: Ecuadorian Navy
- Commissioned: 1991
- Decommissioned: 19 March 2008
- Identification: Hull number: FM 01
- Fate: Scrapped

General characteristics
- Class & type: Leander-class frigate
- Displacement: 2,450 tons standard; 3,200 tons full load
- Length: 372 ft (113 m)
- Beam: 41 ft (12 m)
- Draught: 19 ft (6 m)
- Propulsion: Two Babcock & Wilcox boilers delivering steam to two sets of White/English Electric geared turbines of 30,000 shp (22,000 kW) on two shafts
- Speed: 28 knots (52 km/h)
- Range: 4,600 nautical miles (8,500 km) at 15 knots (28 km/h)
- Complement: 18 officers and 248 sailors
- Sensors & processing systems: 1 × Type 994 air/surface search radar; 1 × Type 1006 navigation radar; 2 × Type 903/904 fire-control radars; 1 × Type 184P active search and attack sonar
- Electronic warfare & decoys: CAAIS (Computer Assisted Action Information System) combat information system, ESM system with UAA-8/9 warning and Type 668/669 jamming elements.
- Armament: 2 × 4.5-inch (110 mm) L45 DP guns in one Mk 6 twin mounting; later replaced by four Exocet MM38 missiles in 2 pairs of launchers, forward of the bridge screen; 3 × quadruple Sea Cat anti-air missile launchers. One Fwd between Exocet launchers and two on Hangar roof, aft.; 2 × 40-millimetre (1.6 in) Bofors guns; 2 × Mk 32 triple 12.75-inch (324 mm) mountings for Mk46 or Stingray torpedoes; Post Falklands conflict saw the addition of 2 x Single Oerlikon 20 mm GAMBO mountings. One on a sponson port side forward of the hangar and one on a raised sponson, starboard side aft quarterdeck.
- Aircraft carried: 1 × Wasp, later Lynx helicopter

HMS Penelope was a Leander-class frigate of the Royal Navy. In the Falklands War, Penelope fired on an Argentine patrol boat and claimed to be the last ship attacked by Argentine aircraft over the course of the war. In 1991, she was commissioned into the Ecuadorean Navy, and renamed Presidente Eloy Alfaro.

== Background ==
The ship that eventually became HMS Penelope was originally intended as a Type 61 aircraft direction frigate to have been named HMS Coventry, as part of a second batch of Type 61s. However, under the 1957 Defence White Paper, the order for Coventry was deferred. the plan for a new batch of four Type 61s, including Coventry, was eventually cancelled in 1961. However, the intended hull was subsequently ordered as a unit of the new Leander-class, and was named as HMS Penelope. Like other ships of the class, except Cleopatra, Penelope was named after a figure of mythology.

== Construction ==
Penelope was laid down at Vickers-Armstrongs' Walker shipyard on Tyneside on 14 March 1961, was launched on 17 August 1962. Penelope was commissioned on 31 October 1963 with the Pennant number F127. Total construction cost was £4,600,000.

The ship was 372 feet (113.4 m) long overall and 360 feet (109.7 m) at the waterline, with a beam of 41 feet (12.5 m) and a maximum draught of 18 feet (5.5 m). Displacement was 2,380 long tons (2,420 t) standard and 2,860 long tons (2,910 t) full load. Two oil-fired boilers fed steam at 550 pounds per square inch (3,800 kPa) and 850 °F (454 °C) to a pair of double reduction geared steam turbines that in turn drove two propeller shafts, with the machinery rated at 30,000 shaft horsepower (22,000 kW), giving a speed of 28 knots (52 km/h; 32 mph).

A twin 4.5-inch (113 mm) Mark 6 gun mount was fitted forward. While the Leander-class was planned to be fitted with the Sea Cat surface-to-air missile, Penelope was completed with two Bofors 40 mm anti-aircraft guns as a temporary substitute until Sea Cat could be fitted. A Limbo anti-submarine mortar was fitted aft to provide a short-range anti-submarine capability, while a hangar and helicopter deck allowed a single Westland Wasp helicopter to be operated, for longer range anti-submarine and anti-surface operations.

As built, Penelope was fitted with a large Type 965 long range air search radar on the ship's mainmast, with a Type 993 short range air/surface target indicating radar and Type 974 navigation radar carried on the ship's foremast. An MRS3 fire control system was carried to direct the 4.5-inch guns. The ship had a sonar suite of Type 177 medium range search sonar, Type 162 bottom search and Type 170 attack sonar, together with a Type 199 variable depth sonar (VDS).

== Operational history ==
=== 1963-1967 ===
After commissioning and workup, Penelope joined the 20th Frigate Squadron which was based at Londonderry Port in Northern Ireland, and from September–December 1964, formed part of a special squadron led by the cruiser Tiger that visited South American ports in an effort to improve relations and increase trade between Britain and South America. The ship transferred to the 2nd Frigate Squadron in September 1965. In 1966 Penelope underwent a refit into a trials ship with much of her weaponry and sensors removed or deactivated. The large Type 965 radar was removed, as was the ship's VDS gear and 40 mm guns, while the twin 4.5-in gun turret and fire-control system was cocooned for preservation. She took part in a variety of trials, including tests of different designs of propellers and was refitted in 1970 in preparation for trials of hull noise which involved having her propellers removed and being towed by sister ship Scylla at the end of a 1 mile (1.6 km) long cable. She was also fitted with a prototype Type 184M sonar.

=== 1968 ===
In 1968, Penelope assisted in the aftermath of the Aer Lingus Flight 712 crash in the Irish Sea. There have been a number of conspiracy theories about the crash, including the alleged involvement of Penelope. The theory goes that the ship, while performing tests, mistook the aircraft for a target drone and shot her down. All conspiracy theories have been refuted by the Ministry of Defence, while a 2002 report on the accident by an international study team noted that Penelope was 130 nautical miles (240 km; 150 mi) from the site of the accident, and was not fitted with surface to air missiles.

=== 1969-1981 ===
The following year, Penelope was present in West Germany during the Kiel Week festival which combined a yachting race and festival events. In 1971, she underwent another refit to allow her to carry out trials on the Sea Wolf missile. All existing armament was removed, and an experimental tracking system and then a Sea Wolf launcher were mounted on the ship's flight deck. The location of individual trials was dictated by the needs of the scientists conducting the trials. Sometimes live fire trials were conducted within a firing range off the Welsh coast. 4.5 inch shells fired from a ship several miles away would pass overhead and be targeted by Sea Wolf. Most trials however were conducted in harbour, tied up alongside, with the boilers shut down. These trials continued until December 1977, when she started another refit at Devonport Dockyard to return her to an operational frigate and convert her to Batch 2 Exocet configuration.

=== Falklands War ===
In 1982, Penelope took part in the Falklands War as part of the "Bristol group", which included two other Leander-class ships - Minerva and Andromeda - she did not reach the Falkland Islands area of operations until 26 May. Upon her arrival, Penelope recovered air-dropped stores. Thereafter she escorted ships to and from the beachhead at San Carlos and Bluff Cove, including, in late May, the damaged Argonaut which had suffered damage after being hit by cannon fire and bombs.

On 13 June, Penelope's Lynx helicopter struck the already stranded Argentinian patrol boat Rio Iguazu with a Sea Skua missile. Penelope also claimed to be the last ship attacked by Argentine aircraft over the course of the war. Penelope returned home in September 1982.

Soon after, Penelope undertook a Falklands patrol in the tense aftermath of the war, and did not return home until June 1983. The following year, she deployed to the South Atlantic again, patrolling and performing other duties in that region.

=== 1988 ===
On 12 September 1988, during a routine daylight replenishment at sea the ship collided with the starboard side of the Canadian naval supply ship HMCS Preserver (AOR 510). Penelope caught the Preserver's starboard anchor, cutting her port side. The Canadian vessel suffered $260,000 damage, while Penelope suffered damage estimated in the millions.

== Ecuadorean Navy service, 1991–2008 ==
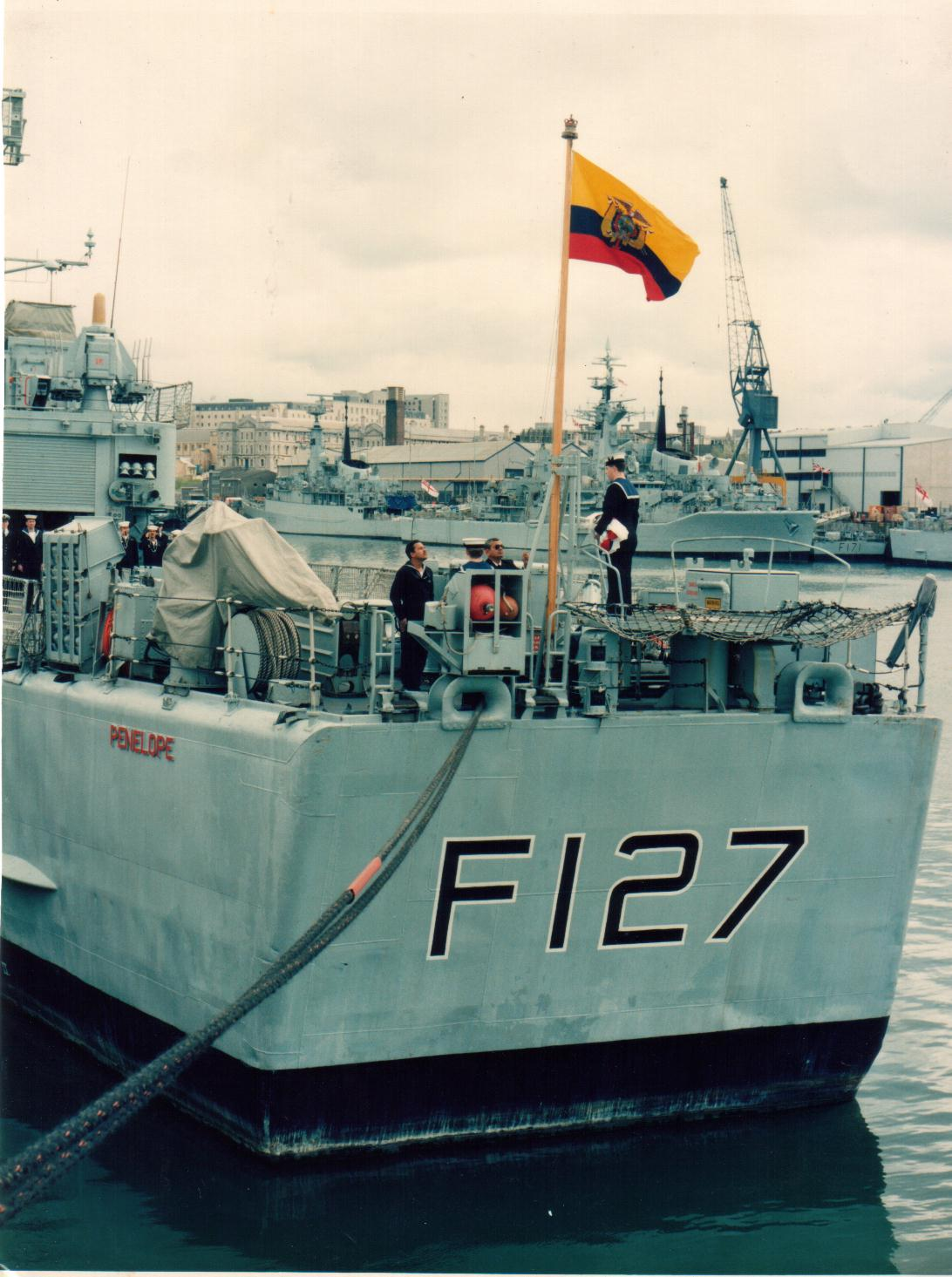
Penelope at handover to Ecuador at Devonport Dockyard in 1991

Penelope was decommissioned and subsequently sold, along with Danae, to Ecuador. She was renamed Presidente Eloy Alfaro after President Eloy Alfaro, a prominent Ecuadorean martyred reformer of the early 20th century.

Presidente Eloy Alfaro was decommissioned on 19 March 2008, after 17 years in the Ecuadorean Navy.

== Publications ==
- Colledge, J. J.; Warlow, Ben (2006) [1969]. Ships of the Royal Navy: The Complete Record of All Fighting Ships of the Royal Navy from the 15th Century to the Present (3rd Rev ed.). London: Chatham Publishing. ISBN 978-1-86176-281-8. OCLC 67375475.
- Gardiner, Robert (1995). Conway's All the World's Fighting Ships 1947–1995. Conway Maritime Press. ISBN 0-85177-605-1.
- Marriott, Leo, 1983. Royal Navy Frigates 1945-1983, Ian Allan Ltd. ISBN 07110 1322 5
- Osborne, Richard; Sowdon, David (1990). Leander Class Frigates. Kendal, UK: World Ships Society. ISBN 0-905617-56-8.
