= Ecuadorian Navy =

- Armada del Ecuador (Spanish)
- Ecuadorian Navy insignia
- Founded: 1832
- Country: Ecuador
- Type: Navy
- Size: 9,400; 27 vessels
- Part of: Armed Forces of Ecuador
- Anniversaries: 25 July, Navy Day and the anniversary of the Battle of Jambelí
- Battle honours: Ecuadorian–Peruvian War 1941

Commanders
- Commander-in-chief of the Navy: Rear Admiral Luis Santiago Chávez

Insignia
- Naval Ensign

- Naval Jack

- Naval Aviation roundel

The Ecuadorian Navy (Spanish: Armada del Ecuador) is an Ecuadorian entity responsible for the surveillance and protection of national maritime territory and has a personnel of 9,400 men to protect a coastline of 2,237 km which reaches far into the Pacific Ocean. The vessels are identified by a ship prefix of B.A.E.: Buque de la Armada del Ecuador (Ship of the Ecuadorian Navy) or L.A.E.: Lancha de la Armada del Ecuador (Boat of the Ecuadorian Navy).

== Mission ==
Organize, train, equip and maintain naval capabilities, as well as to assist and support all procedures involving national security and development. Contribute to the achievement of safeguarding national objectives in times of peace and war.

== Vision ==
Maintain highly trained naval forces to secure victory within the maritime zone in order to support developing communities. As a consequence operate highly qualified military personnel whom are able to fulfill this role based on elevated moral, values and principles.

== History ==
The roots of the Ecuadorian Navy or (Armada Ecuatoriana) date back to 1823 whilst forming a part of the Gran Colombian fleet. The government of President Eloy Alfaro (1906–1911) made one of the most notable naval acquisitions of the time, the torpedo ship Libertador Bolívar, with the aim of restoring the navy. In 1832, the Ecuadorian Congress officially established the Ecuadorian Maritime Department. On 25 July 1941 during the Ecuadorian–Peruvian War, the gunboat Abdón Calderón commanded by Rafael Morán Valverde encountered the Peruvian destroyer Almirante Villar in the Jambeli channel. The Ecuadorian gunboat opened fire on Villar, keeping its distance while doing shots for elevation, but the Peruvian destroyer returned fire for the duration of the chase, which was ended by the Peruvians when the Calderon took refuge in the channels. The Calderon was unharmed in the skirmish and according to Ecuador, the Peruvian Villar suffered damages, an allegation that has always been refuted by Perú. However, this event had no influence over the general outcome of the war as Puerto Bolivar was lost to Peruvian troops only two days later.

== Present day ==
Today, the Ecuadorian Navy is a compact, efficient and well-balanced force. However, limited funds hinder any major acquisitions and the chances of maintaining a strong force within the Pacific Ocean. Since introduction of a restructuring program within the Armed Forces (PATRIA I), the Navy's structure became simplified. It supervises the Pacific Coast and Galápagos Islands as one naval zone. Most seagoing assets are based at Guayaquil.

=== Active ships ===
Currently the Navy consists of the following vessels:

Vessel	Origin	Type	Class	In service	Notes
Training ship (1 in service)
BAE Guayas (BE-21)	Spain	Sail training ship	steel-hulled barque	Yes	As an ambassador of its country, the Guayas is a participant in tall ship regattas. By the end of 2008 the Guayas had visited 60 harbours in 25 countries and covered about 340,000 nautical miles (630,000 km).
Submarines (2 in service)
BAE Shyri (S101)	Germany	Diesel-electric submarine	Type 209/1300	Yes	
BAE Huancavilca (S102)	Germany	Diesel-electric submarine	Type 209/1300	Yes	On September 16, 2011, the submarine was sent to the ASMAR shipyard in Chile for modernization, which was completed in 2014.
Guided missile frigates (2 in service)
BAE Presidente Eloy Alfaro (FM-01)	United Kingdom	guided missile frigate	Condell-class frigate	Yes	Acquired from Chile in March, 2008.
BAE Morán Valverde FM-02	United Kingdom	guided missile frigate	Condell-class frigate	Yes	Extensively refitted between April 2004 and December 2005. Acquired from Chile in March, 2008.
Guided missile corvettes (6 in service)
BAE Esmeraldas (CM-11)	Italy	guided missile corvette	Esmeraldas-class	Yes	Refitted in 2006 under the Esmeraldas program.
BAE Manabí (CM-12)	Italy	guided missile corvette	Esmeraldas-class	Yes	Modernised, returned to fleet 2018.
BAE Los Rios (CM-13)	Italy	guided missile corvette	Esmeraldas-class	Yes	Modernised, returned to fleet 2018.
BAE El Oro (CM-14)	Italy	guided missile corvette	Esmeraldas-class	Yes	Refitted in 2008 under the Esmeraldas program.
BAE Galápagos (CM-15)	Italy	guided missile corvette	Esmeraldas-class	Yes	Refitted in 2010 under the Esmeraldas program.
BAE Loja (CM-16)	Italy	guided missile corvette	Esmeraldas-class	Yes	Modernised, returned to fleet 2019.
Offshore Patrol Vessel (2 in service)
LAE Isla San Cristobal (LG-30)	Netherlands	Offshore Patrol Vessel	Damen Stan patrol vessel 5009 class	Yes	
LAE Isla Isabela (LG-31)	Netherlands	Offshore Patrol Vessel	Damen Stan patrol vessel 5009 class	Yes	
Fast attack craft (3 in service)
LAE Quito (LM-31)	Germany	Fast attack craft	TNC 45 Seawolf class	Yes	Modernised
LAE Guayaquil (LM-32)	Germany	Fast attack craft	TNC 45 Seawolf class	Yes	Modernised
LAE Cuenca (LM-33)	Germany	Fast attack craft	TNC 45 Seawolf class	Yes	Modernised
Auxiliaries (12 in service)
BAE Huacolpo (TR-61)	China	Cargo ship	Cargo - Hazard B class	Yes	ex-Fu Yuan Yu Leng 999
BAE Calicuchima (TR-62)	United Kingdom	ammunition supply ship	Kintebury class	Yes	ex-RMAS Throsk (A379)
BAE Atahualpa (TR-63)	Italy	water harbour tanker	Brenta type	Yes	ex-A 5356 Basento
BAE Quisquis (TR-64)	United Kingdom	water harbour tanker	Waterfall class	Yes	ex-Waterside (Y-20)
BAE Taurus (TR-65)	Ecuador	coastal oil tanker	Taurus class	Yes	Civilian ship bought in 1987. Built by Astinave, Guayaquil. Currently status is unknown.
BAE Chimborazo (RA-70)	United States	Fleet Tug	Abnaki-class tug	Yes	Ex-USS Chowanoc (ATF-100)
BAE Sangay (RB-72)		Tugboat	YTM class tug	Yes	
BAE Cotopaxi (RB-73)	United States	Tugboat		Yes	
BAE Wolf (RB-74)	Netherlands	Tugboat		Yes	
BAE Iliniza (RB-75)		Tugboat	YTM class tug	Yes	
BAE Altar (RB-76)		Tugboat	YTM class tug	Yes	
BAE Quilotoa (RB-78)		Tugboat	YTM class tug	Yes	
Scientific research vessels (2 in service)
BAE Orion (BI-91)	Japan	Oceanographic research ship	Orion class	Yes	
LAE Sirius	Ecuador	Oceanographic research ship	Sirius class	Yes	

== Naval weapon systems ==
Name	Origin	Type	Version	Used by	Notes
Naval artillery
QF 4.5 inch naval gun	United Kingdom	Dual-purpose naval gun	Mark VI	Condell class frigate	
Oto Melara 76/62 Compact Gun	Italy	Dual-purpose naval gun	76/62 Compact	Esmeraldas-class	
Oto Melara Twin 40 Compact Gun	Italy	Close-in weapon system (CIWS)	Twin 40L70	Esmeraldas-class	
Raytheon Phalanx 20mm Gatling Gun	United States	Close-in weapon system (CIWS)	Phalanx Block 0	Condell-class	
Oerlikon GDM-A de 35	Italy; Switzerland	Naval turret	Two 35mm autocannon	TNC 45 Seawolf class	
Anti-ship missiles
MBDA Exocet	France	anti-ship missile (AShM)	MM40 Block II MM38	Condell class frigate Esmeraldas-class TNC 45 Seawolf class FAC	
IAI Gabriel	Israel	anti-ship missile (AShM)	Mk 2	TNC 45 Seawolf class FAC	
Surface-to-air missile
MBDA Aspide	Italy	surface-to-air missile (SAM)	Albatros Aspide MK-1A	Esmeraldas-class	
MBDA Simbad	France	surface-to-air missile (SAM)	Mistral	Condell-class	
Anti-submarine torpedo
Mark 46 torpedo	United States	anti-submarine lightweight torpedo	Mod 5A	Condell class frigate	
Whitehead A244-S	Italy	anti-submarine lightweight torpedo	A244/S	Esmeraldas-class	
Torpedoes
WASS Black Shark	Italy	533 mm heavyweight torpedo		Type 209 submarine	
Whitehead A-184	Italy	533 mm heavyweight torpedo	A184 Mod 3	Type 209 submarine	
Atlas Elektronik SST	Germany	533 mm heavyweight torpedo	SST-4 Mod 0	Type 209 submarine	
Atlas SUT	Germany	533 mm heavyweight torpedo	AEG SUT 264	Type 209 submarine	
STN Atlas Seehecht	Germany	533 mm heavyweight torpedo	DM2A4	Type 209 submarine	

=== Naval aviation ===
The Ecuadorian Naval Aviation (Aviación Naval Ecuatoriana) was formed in 1967 with fixed-wing aircraft and received some helicopters in 1973. It remains the least effective section of the navy; capable of performing limited maritime patrol missions, it consists of a fixed wing and a rotary wing element. Aircraft are based at Base Aérea Simón Bolívar in Guayaquil and the Eloy Alfaro Air Base in Manta. The most recent acquisitions of the ANE are two Heron 1 and four Searcher Mk. III from Israel. These have increased the Navy's coastal surveillance capacity significantly.

=== Active aircraft ===
Currently the Navy consists of the following aircraft:

Aircraft	Origin	Type	Version	In service	Notes
Maritime patrol aircraft
Beechcraft Super King Air	United States	Maritime surveillance aircraft	CATPASS 250MP	3	Two units delivered in January and June 1997 respectively. CATPASS conversion includes a bottom-mounted surface-search radar, FLIR and ESM provisions.
CASA CN-235 Persuader	Spain	Maritime patrol aircraft	CN-235-100 MP Persuader CN-235-300 MP Persuader	1 1	Maritime patrol/multipurpose transport aircraft equipped with the FITS system.
Helicopters
Bell 206 JetRanger Bell TH-57 SeaRanger	United States	Utility helicopter / Training helicopter	206B TH-57A	3 3	
Bell 230	United States	Radar surveillance helicopter	230T	1	Two units delivered in total. One unit crashed at sea in 2009.
Bell 430	United States	Utility helicopter	430	3	Two units delivered on August 1, 2010. The first 430 received a Garmin GNS400 GPS coupled to the autopilot. Both were equipped with a Honeywell Mark XXII EGPWS, right hand sliding door, hoist provisions and some maintenance items. Two units delivered on September 11, 2014. 1 crashed in 2024.
Trainer Aircraft
Beechcraft T-34 Turbo Mentor	United States	Advanced trainer	T-34C-1	5	
ENAER T-35 Pillán	Chile	Basic trainer	T-35B	4	
Unmanned Aerial Vehicles
IAI Heron	Israel	MALE UAV	Heron I	2	
IAI Searcher	Israel	Reconnaissance UAV	Searcher III	4	
Utility Aircraft
Beechcraft Super King Air	United States	Light transport	B200 B300 B350	2 1 1	
Beechcraft King Air	United States	Light transport	C90A	2	
Cessna 172	United States	Liaison aircraft	SP	2	

=== Coast Guard ===
The Coast Guard (Cuerpo de Guardacostas de la Armada) became fully operational in 1980. Their mission is to control maritime activities on national territory, including all river zones. The objectives are internal security, protection of human life at sea, and environmental protection. It consists of around 250 men and 30 major as well as 40 smaller modern patrol vessels. In 2011 Ecuador ordered four 26.5 metres (87 ft) patrol vessels based on the Damen Stan 2600 design for the Coast Guard.

=== Marines ===
The Naval Infantry Corps (Cuerpo de Infanteria de Marina) was formed on 12 November 1962. It maintains a strength of around 1700 marines, with their HQ in Guayaquil. The units are individually spread across the naval coast of Ecuador and are equipped with infantry support weapons, including 60 mm and 81 mm mortars, 106 mm recoilless rifles (RCLs) and Humvees. However, it lacks amphibious assault and sealift capacity. The Ecuadorian Marines are to maintain a high level of alert in order to execute special operations in difficult territory as well as to provide a fast response to counter amphibious incursions. Structure:

- Escuela de la Infanteria Marina (Naval Infantry School)
- Compañia de Seguridad "Guayaquil" (Security Detachment)
- Batallón de Infanteria Marina "Jambeli"
- Batallón de Infanteria Marina "San Eduardo"
- Batallón de Infanteria Marina "San Lorenzo"
- Batallón de Infanteria Marina "Jaramijo"
- Batallón de Infanteria Marina "Esmeraldas"

Name	Type	Caliber	Origin	In service	Notes
General-purpose machine gun
Heckler & Koch HK21	HK21E	7.62×51mm NATO	Germany		Standard general-purpose machine gun.
Assault rifle
M16 rifle	A2/A4	5.56×45mm NATO	United States		Standard assault rifle.
M4 carbine	A1	5.56×45mm NATO	United States		Special Forces.
Submachine gun
Heckler & Koch MP5		9×19mm Parabellum	Germany		Special Forces.
Colt 9mm SMG		9×19mm Parabellum	United States		Special Forces.
Semi-automatic pistol
M1911 pistol		.45 ACP	United States		Standard pistol.
Hand grenade
M26 grenade	M26A1/M61		United States		
Red dot sight
Advanced Combat Optical Gunsight	Reflex sight		United States		Used by special forces.
Aimpoint CompM4	Reflex sight		United States		Used by special forces.
Grenade launcher
Milkor MGL		40 mm grenade	South Africa		
M203 grenade launcher		40 mm grenade	United States		Grenade launcher coupled in M4 carbines.
Anti-materiel rifle
Barrett M82		.50 BMG	United States		
Infantry mortar
M1 mortar		81 mm	United States		
M29 mortar		81 mm	United States		
Hirtenberger M6C-210		60 mm	Austria		Light mortar, used by special operations units.
Recoilless rifle
M40 recoilless rifle		105 mm	United States		
M67 recoilless rifle	Shoulder-launched missile	90 mm	United States		
Rocket-propelled grenade
RPG-7	Shoulder-launched missile	40 mm	Soviet Union		
Man-portable air-defense system
MBDA Mistral	MANPADS		France		Some mounted on Humvee and truck platform.
Howitzer
M101 howitzer	Towed	105mm Howitzer	United States		
Light utility vehicle
Humvee	4×4		United States	30	Around 30 humvees are in use within the Naval Infantry Corps.
Military truck
M939 Truck	6×6		United States		Donated by the US NAS program in 2003.
Mercedes-Benz Zetros	6x6		Germany		

== Equipment gallery ==
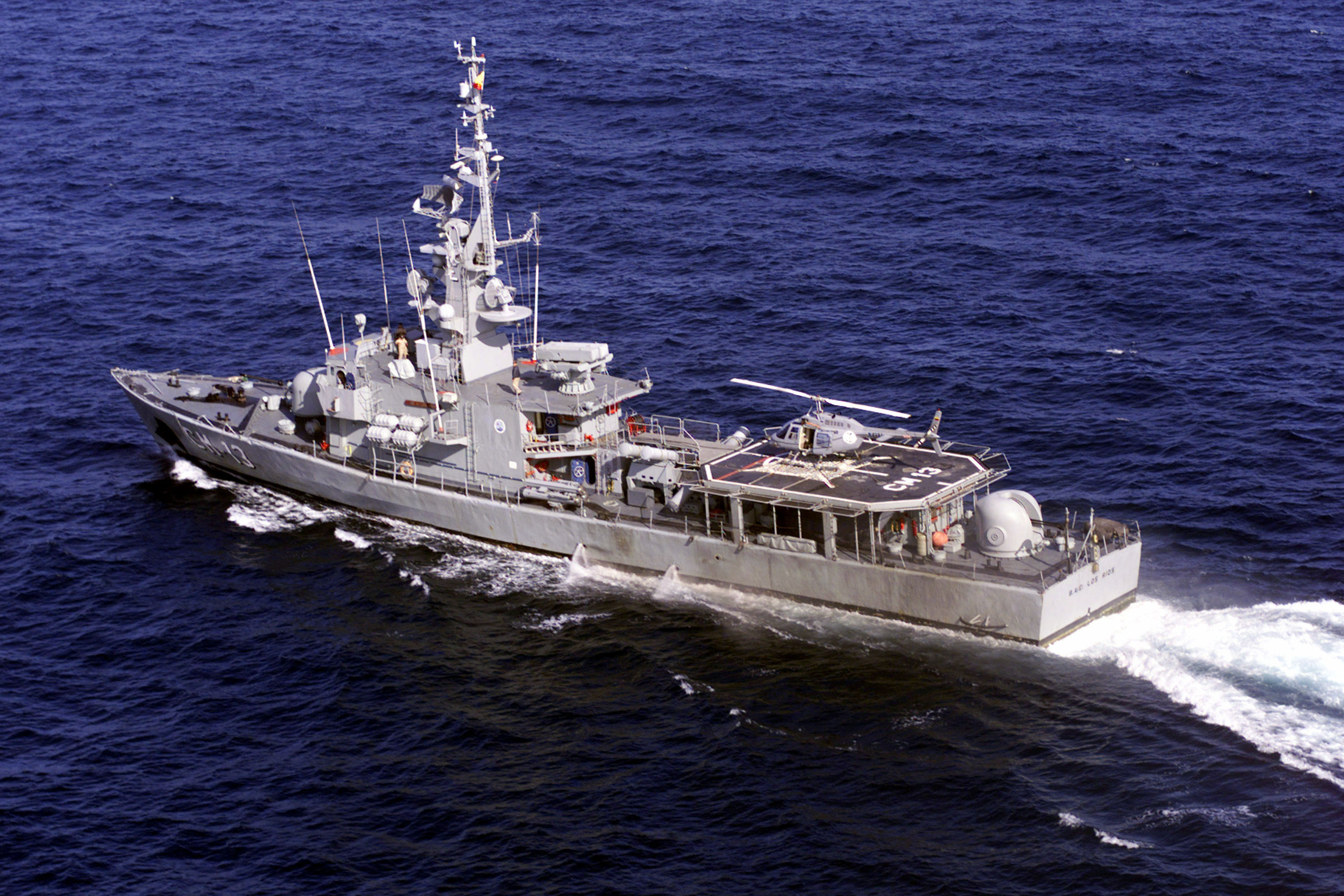
Ecuadorian navy FSG Corvette ESMERALDAS (CM 11), equipped with 2 x 3 MM40 Exocet SSM, 1 x 4 Aspide SAM, 1 x 76mm gun, 6 x 324mm ASTI, helicopter on deck (Bell 206).

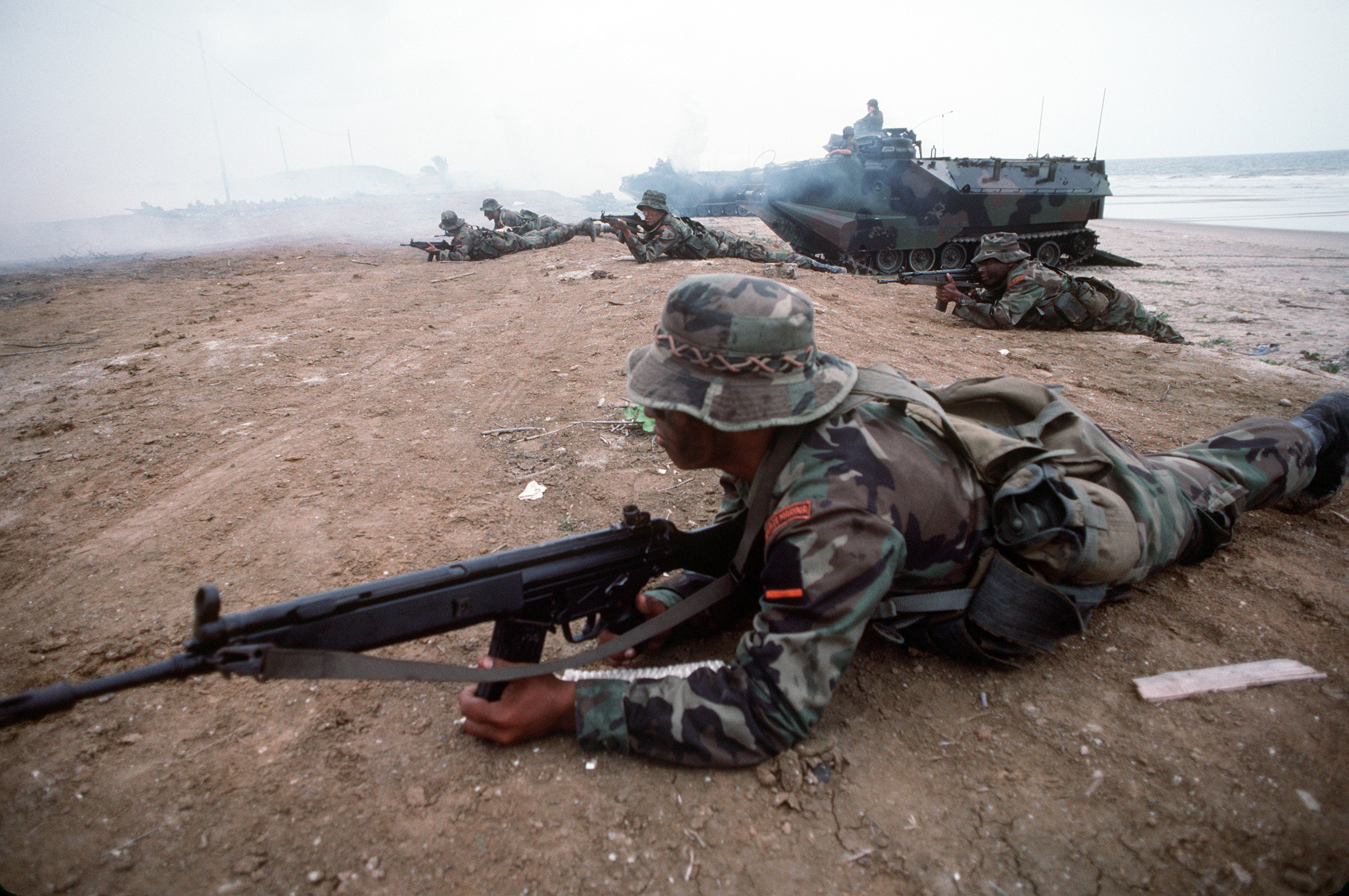
An Ecuadorian Marine with a HK-33 rifle, during an amphibious assault exercise (UNITAS), in the background a US Amphibious Assault Vehicle.

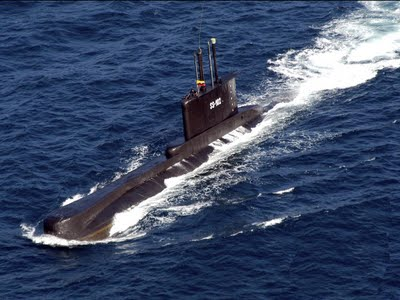
Ecuadorian submarine BAE Shyri in 2003. Ecuador owns two of these submarines.

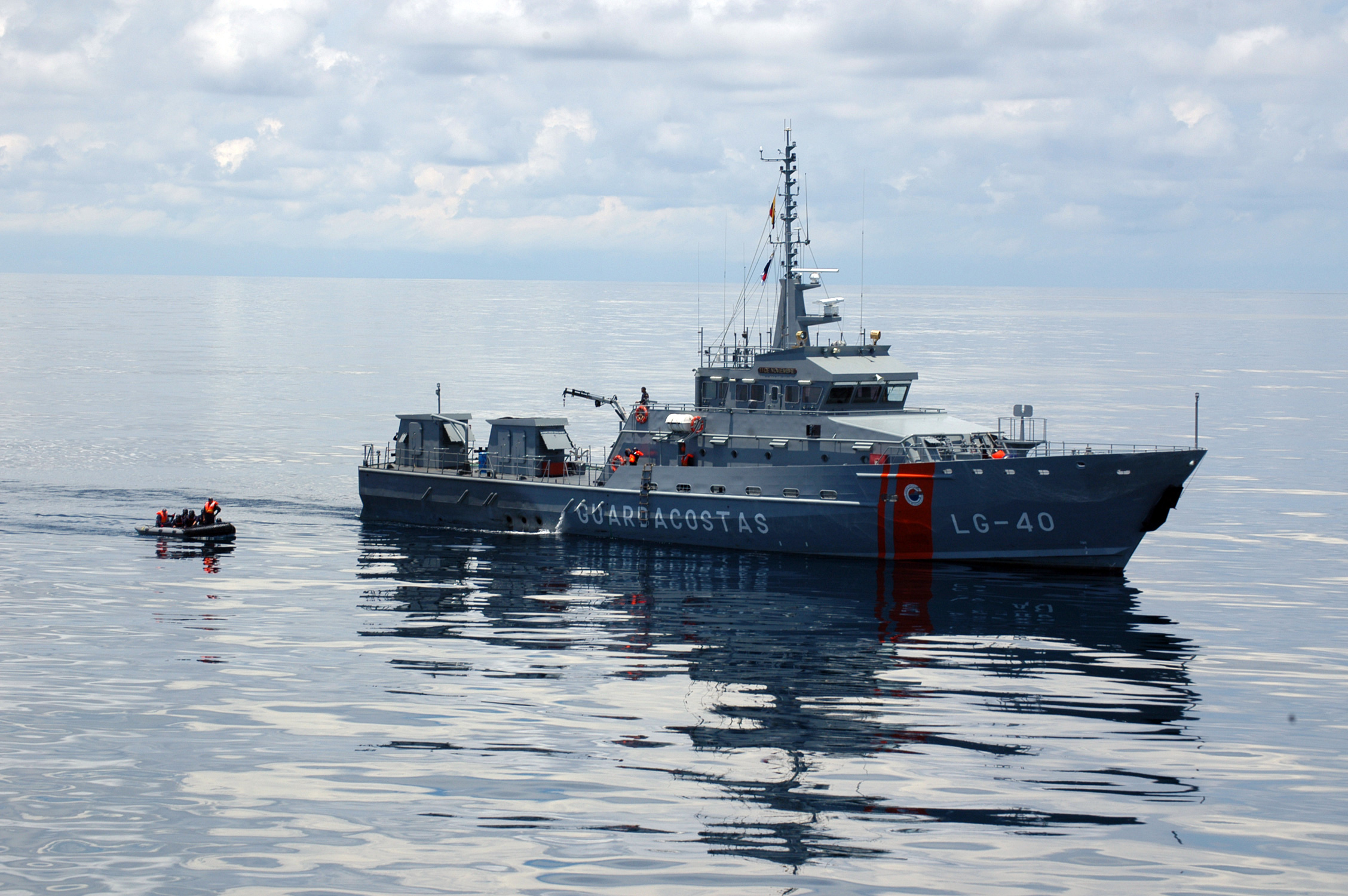
An Ecuadorian Coast Guard combat ship (LG-40) during an exercise.

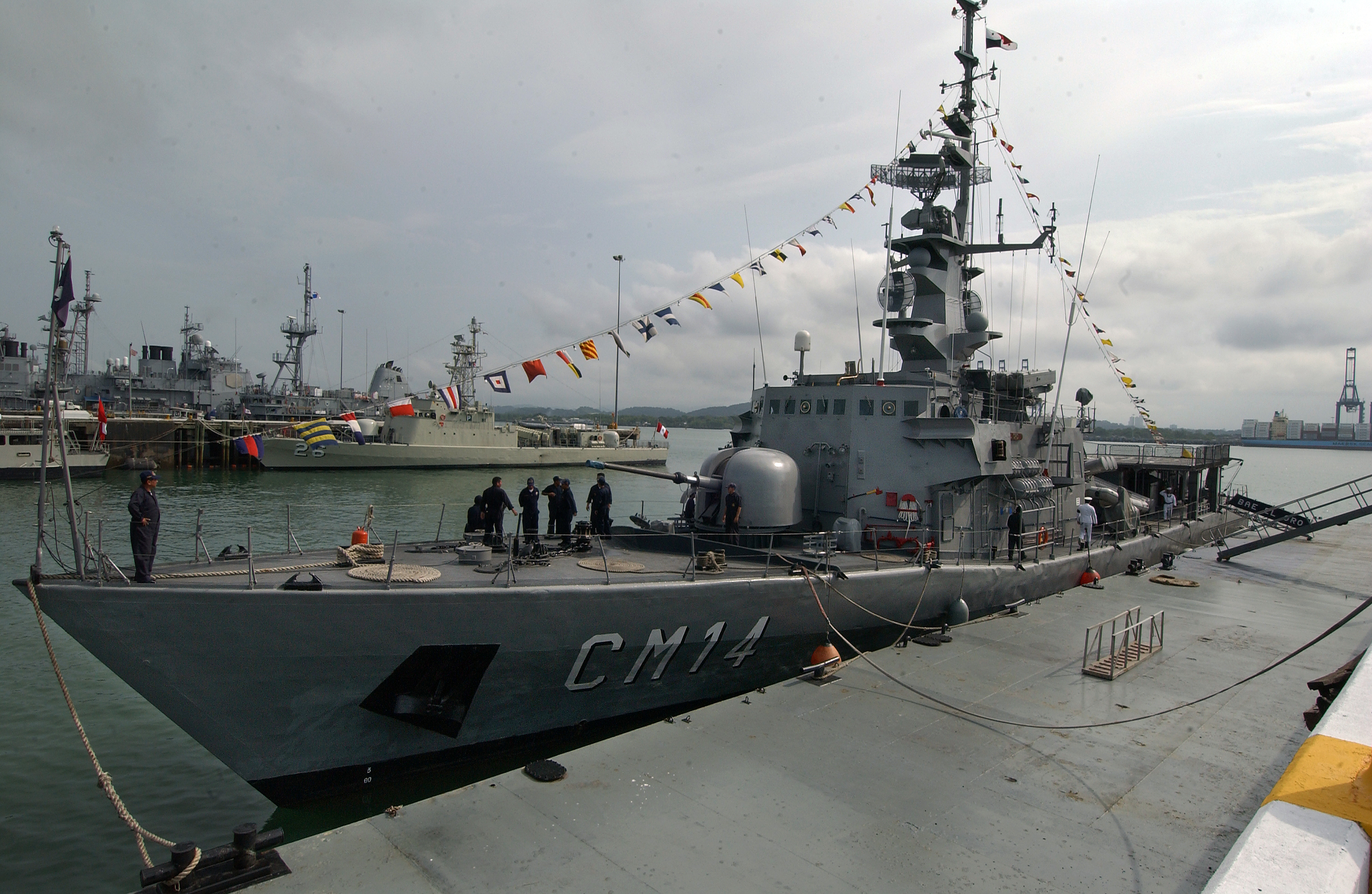
The Ecuadorian corvette BAE El Oro (CM 14) during an exercise.

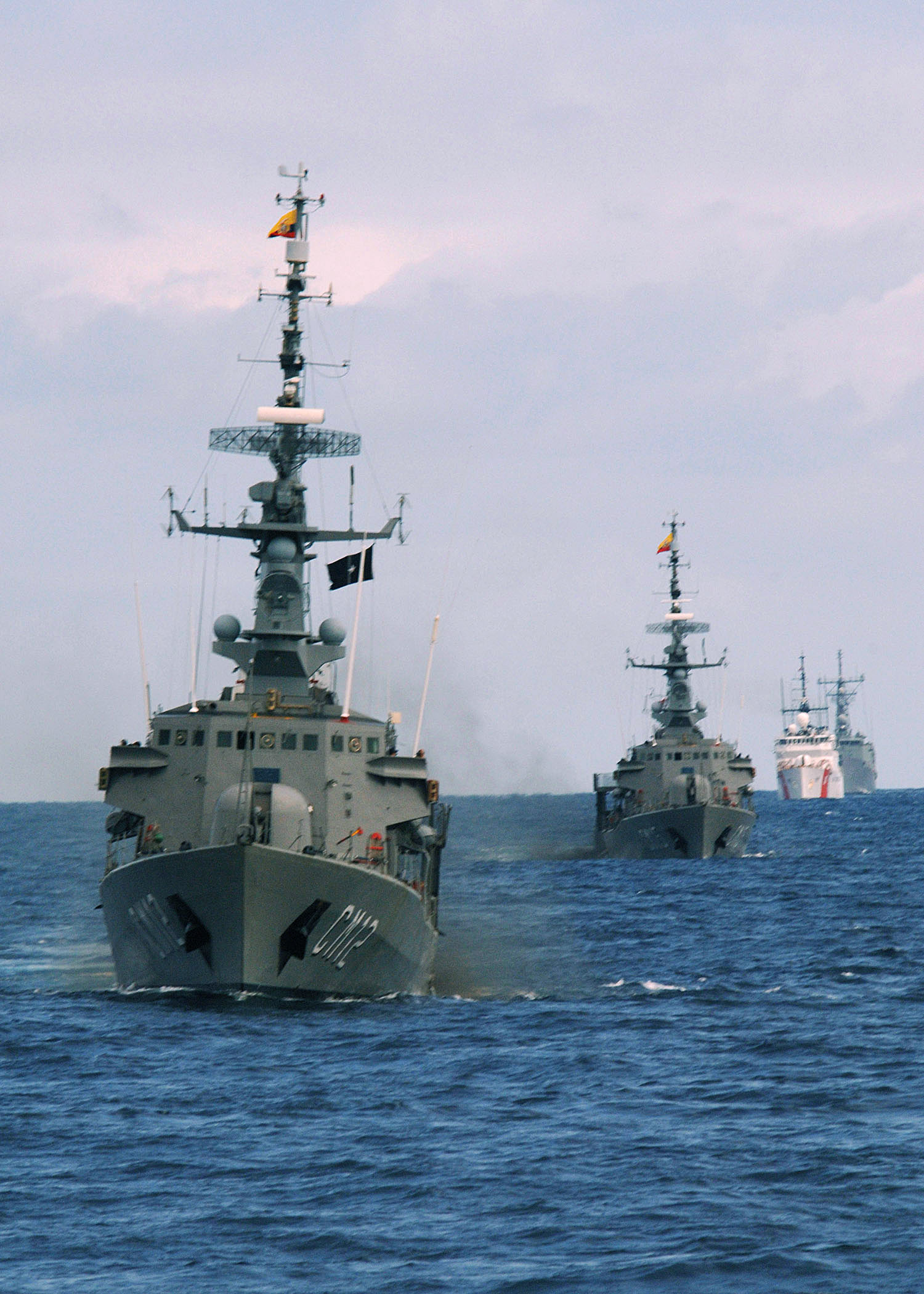
The Ecuadorian Navy corvette BAE Manabi (CM 12) during an exercise.

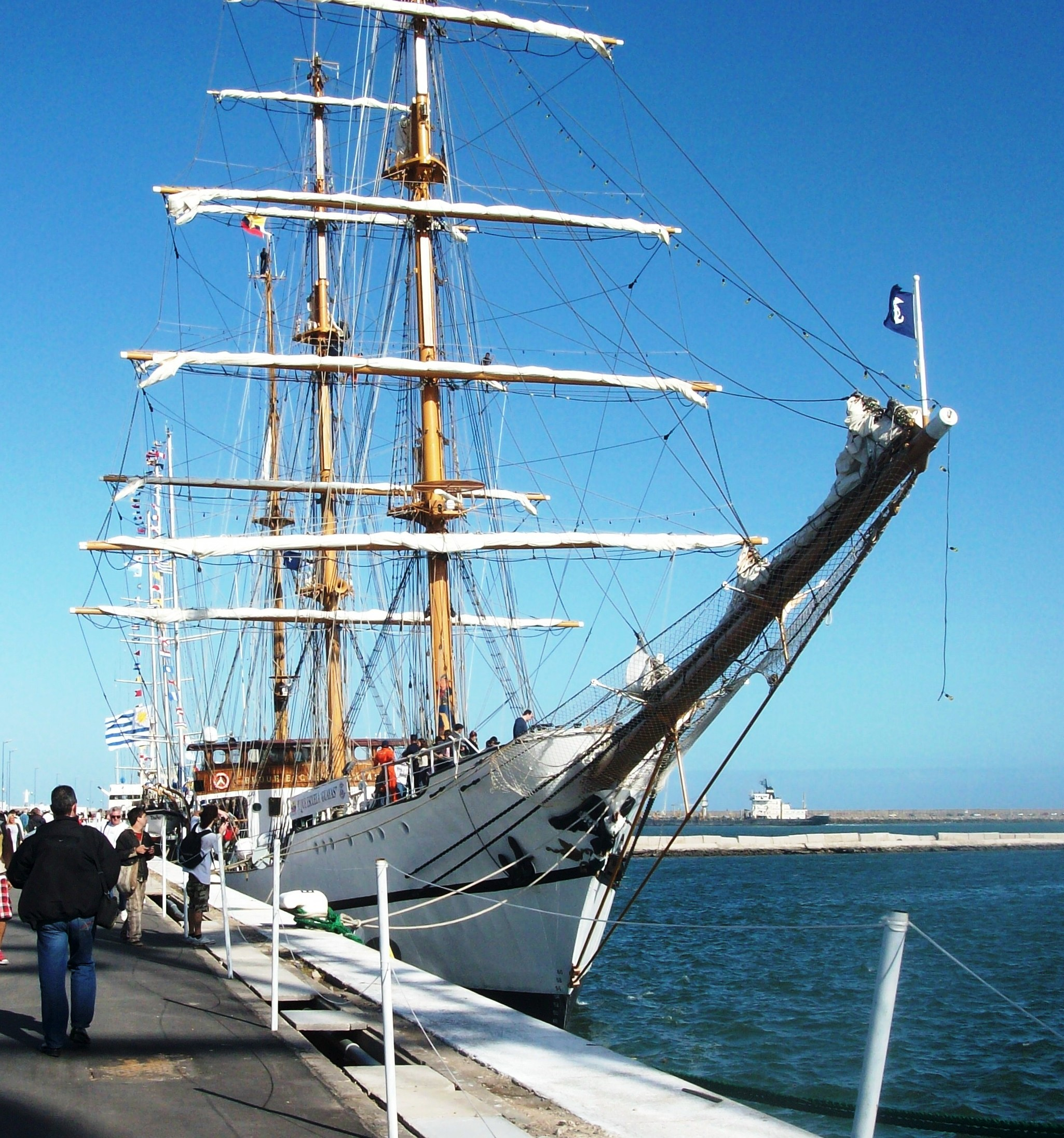
The school ship Guayas on a visit in Argentina.

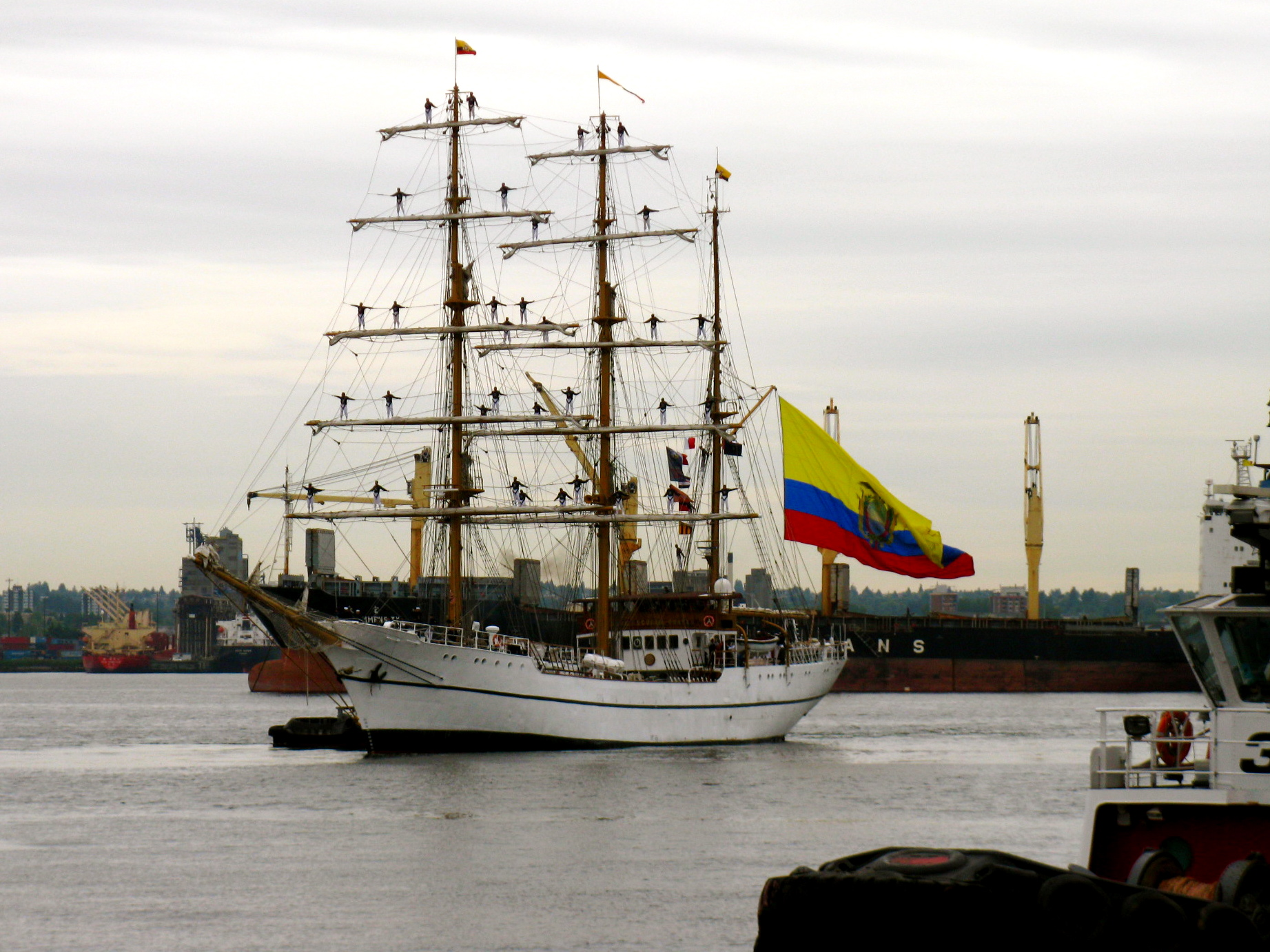
The Guayas in Sweden (2008).

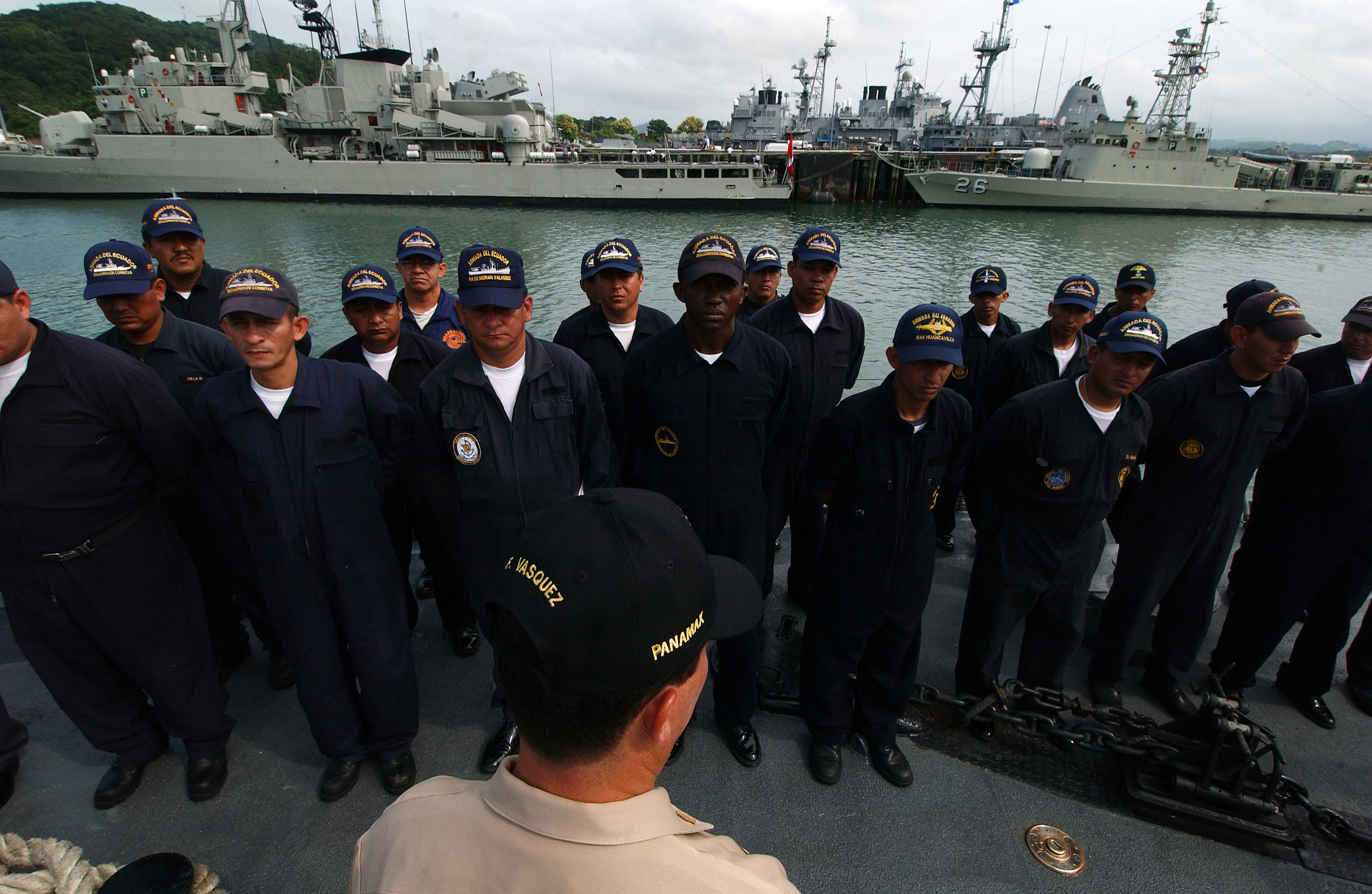
Ecuadorian sailors assigned to the Ecuadorian Corvette BAE El Oro (CM 14).

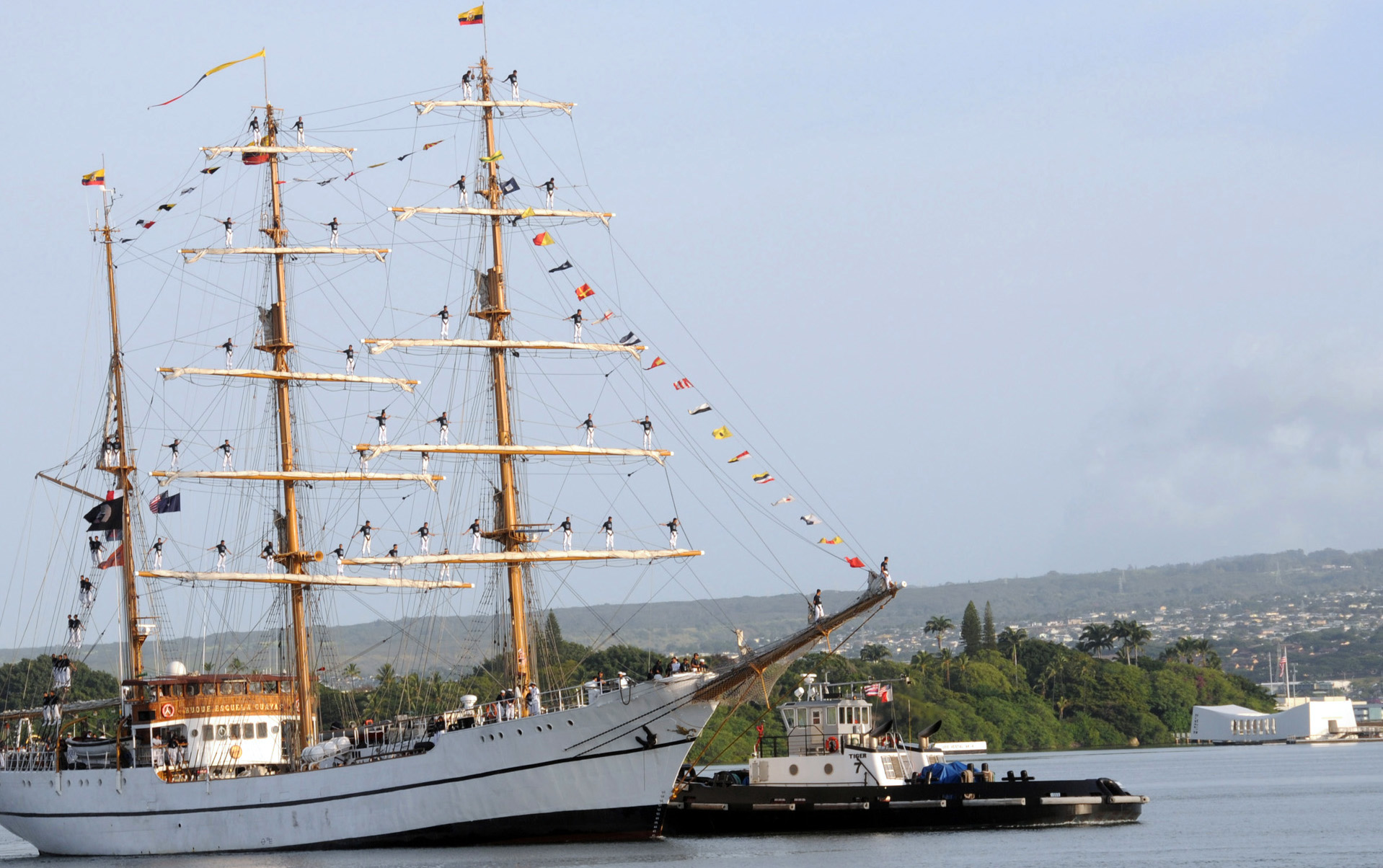
Ecuadorian Navy ship Guayas, visiting Pearl Harbor.

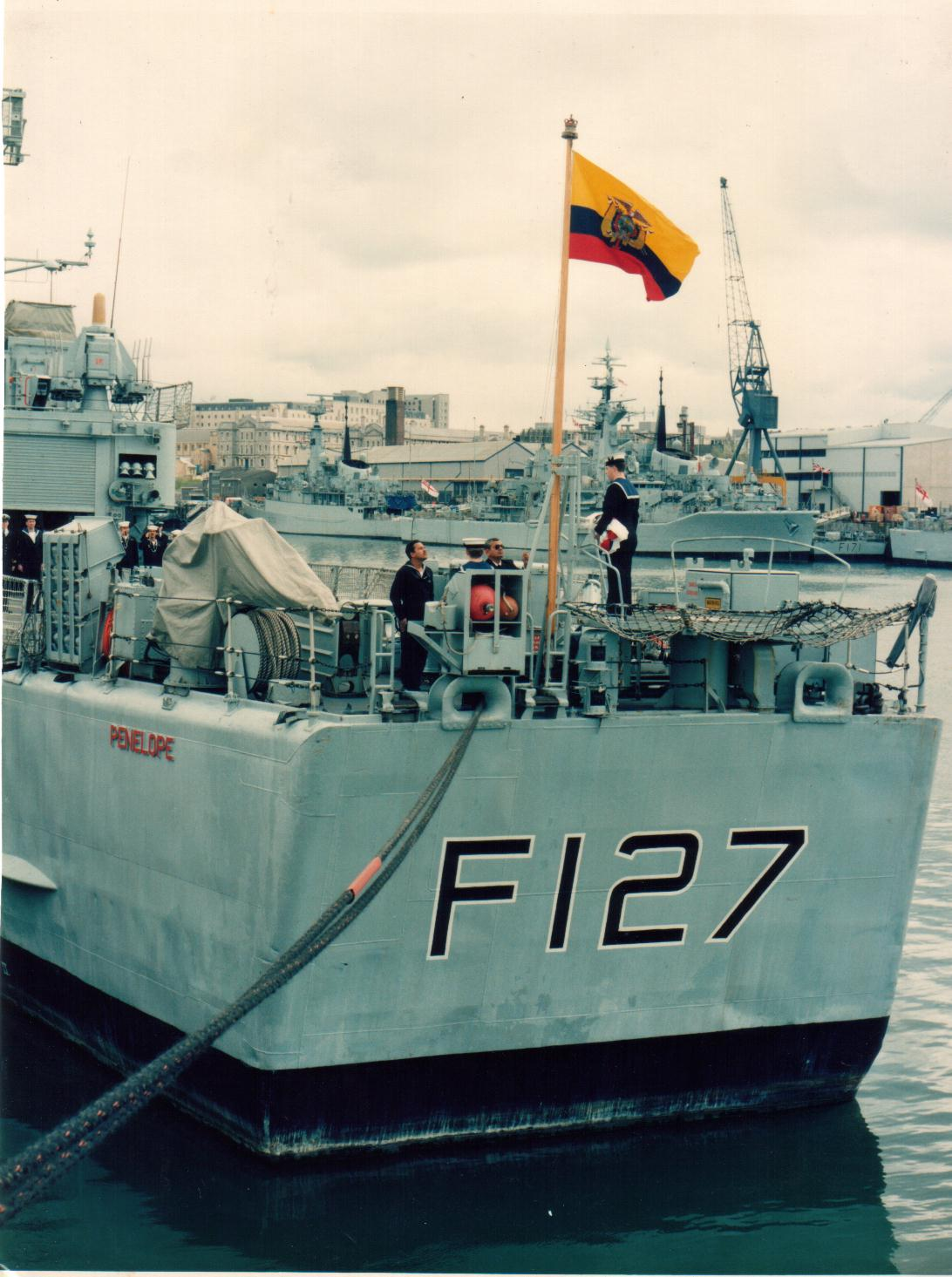
In 1991, acquired from the Royal Navy along with the former Danae (F47), the Eloy Alfaro was decommissioned on 19 March 2008, after 17 years of service in the Ecuadorian Navy.

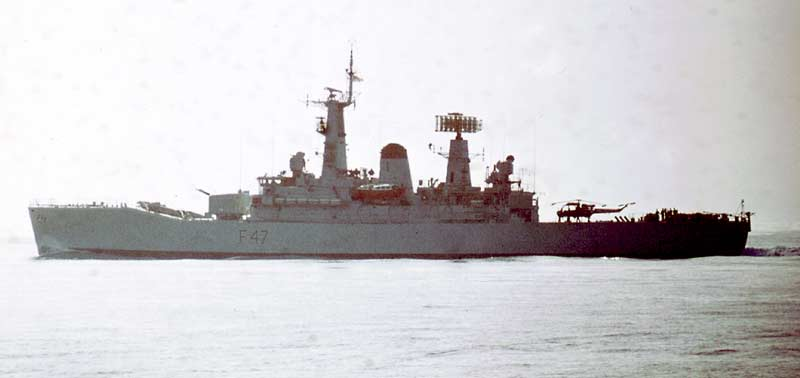
Acquired in 1991 from the Royal Navy, the Morán Valverde was decommissioned in October 2008.

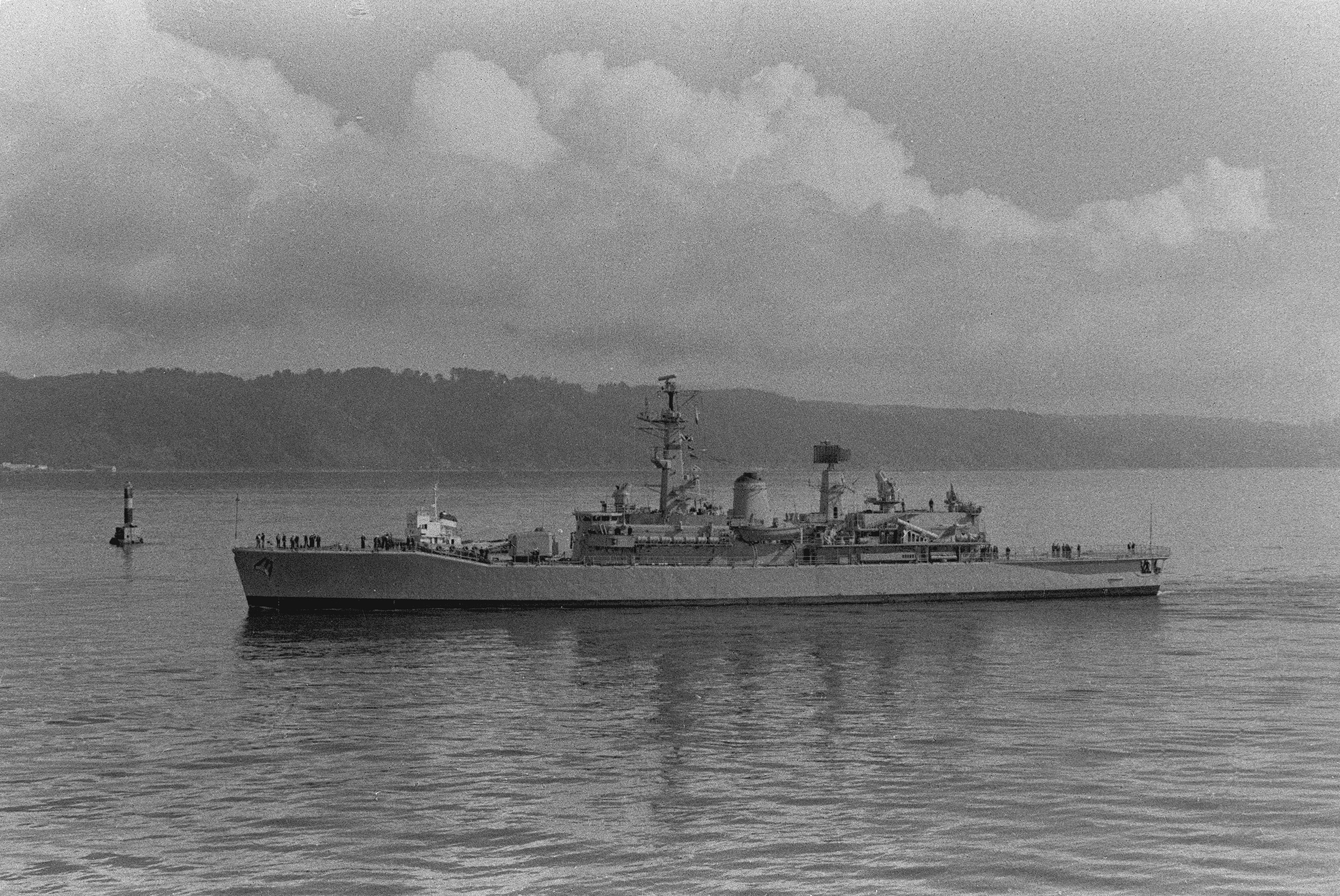
Along with her sister ship Almirante Lynch, the former Almirante Condell, renamed BAE Eloy Alfaro (FM 01). Both ships were handed over by the Chilean Navy to the Navy of Ecuador on 18 April 2008.

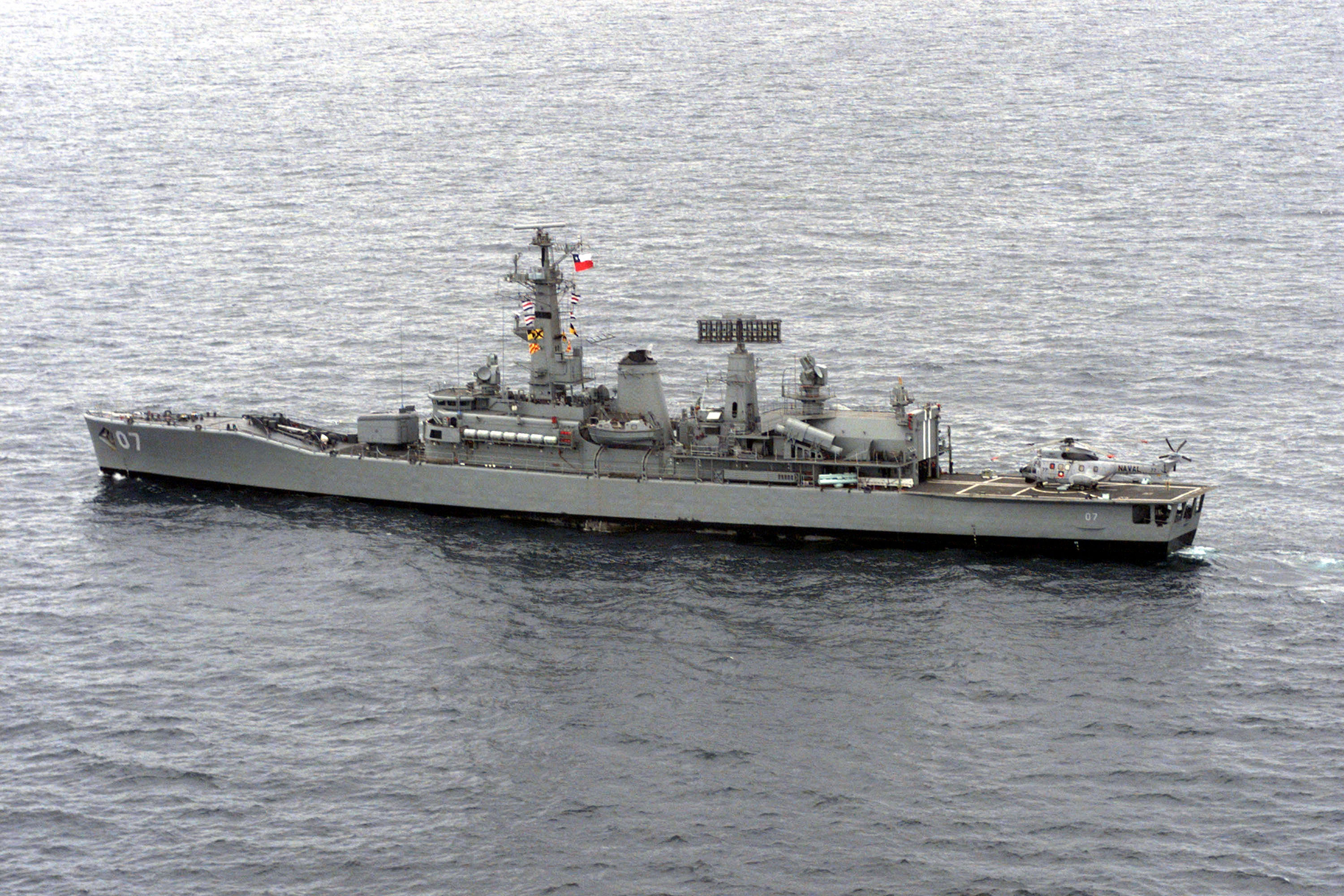
In March 2008, the Almirante Lynch and sister ship Almirante Condell (PFG-06) were sold to Ecuador. The former Almirante Lynch is in active service under the name BAE Morán Valverde.

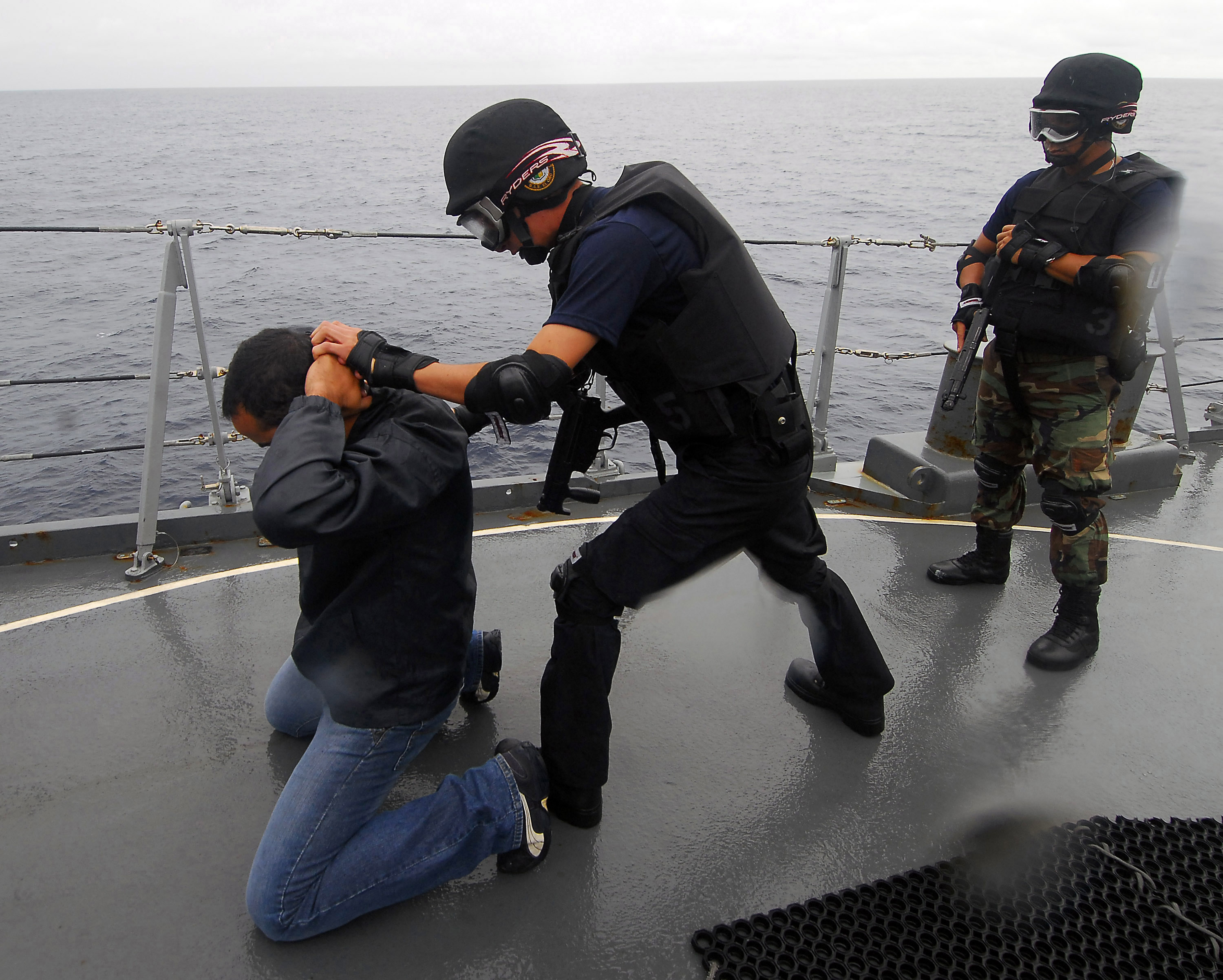
An Ecuadorian maritime interdiction team, armed with MP5s, assigned to conduct a visit, board, search, and seizure exercise.

== Ranks ==
=== Commissioned officer ranks ===
The rank insignia of commissioned officers.

Rank group	General / flag officers			Senior officers			Junior officers
Ecuadorian Navy
Ecuadorian Navy	Almirante	Vicealmirante	Contralmirante	Capitán de navío	Capitán de fragata	Capitán de corbeta	Teniente de navío	Teniente de fragata	Alferez de fragata

=== Other ranks ===
The rank insignia of non-commissioned officers and enlisted personnel.

Rank group	Senior NCOs					Junior NCOs		Enlisted
Ecuadorian Navy
Ecuadorian Navy	Sub-oficial mayor	Sub-oficial primero	Sub-oficial segundo	Sargento primero	Sargento segundo	Cabo primero	Cabo segundo	Marinero	Grumete 2do año	Grumete 1er año

== See also ==
- Armed Forces of Ecuador
- Bolivarian Armada of Venezuela
- Colombian National Armada
- Peruvian Navy
