= Condell-class frigate =

1974 class of Chilean frigates

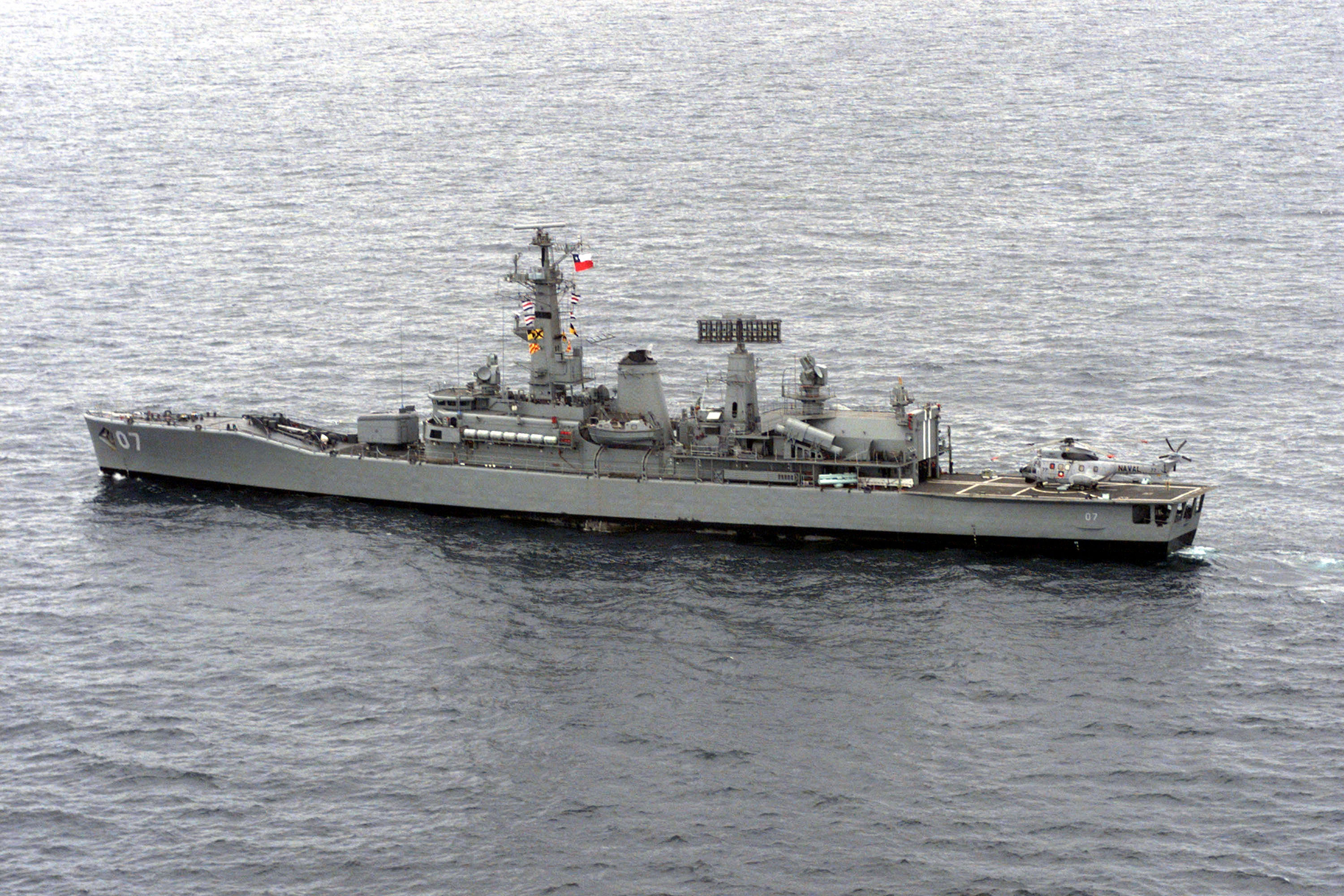
- Almirante Lynch (FFG 07)

Class overview
- Name: Condell class
- Builders: Yarrow (Shipbuilders) Ltd., Glasgow
- Operators: Chilean Navy; Ecuadorian Navy
- Completed: 2
- Active: 2

General characteristics
- Type: Frigate
- Displacement: 2,500 tons
- Length: 113 m (371 ft)
- Beam: 13.1 m (43 ft)
- Draught: 5.5 m (18 ft)
- Propulsion: 2 × Babcock & Wilcox boilers; 2 × White/English Electric steam turbines; 2 shafts; 25,000 shp (19,000 kW)
- Speed: 29 knots (54 km/h; 33 mph)
- Range: 4,500 nmi (8,300 km; 5,200 mi) at 12 knots (22 km/h; 14 mph)
- Complement: 263 (20 officers)
- Sensors & processing systems: SISDEF Imagen SP 100 CMS; 1 Type 965 air-search; 1 Elta EL/M-2221GM fire control; 1 Type 1006 navigation radar; 1 Type 184P hull sonar
- Electronic warfare & decoys: Elisra NS-9003A ESM system; 2 × Corvus trainable chaff rocket launchers; Wallop Barricade double layer chaff launcher
- Armament: 4 × Exocet MM40 Block 1 SSMs; 1 × Vickers 114 mm/55 Mk 6 twin gun; 1 × 20 mm Phalanx Block 0 CIWS; 2 × Oerlikon 20 mm gun; 2 × Mk.32 triple torpedo tubes
- Aircraft carried: 1 × AS-532 SC Eurocopter Cougar
- Aviation facilities: Fixed hangar for 1 medium helicopter; Indal ASIST helicopter recovery system.

The Condell class was the name given to a class of two new build and upgraded type Leander-class frigates of the Chilean Navy, Almirante Condell and Almirante Lynch.

== Overview ==
They were ordered by the Chilean government in 1969 as ASW frigates. The ships were built between 1969 and 1973, under Chilean modifications, by Yarrow (Shipbuilders) Ltd. in Scotstoun, Glasgow. Almirante Condell arrived in Chile in 1973, with Almirante Lynch following in 1974.

Almirante Lynch was decommissioned on 4 July 2007 after 33 years of service. Almirante Condell was decommissioned on 18 April 2008, before both were sold to the Ecuadorian Navy on the same day. Both frigates were replaced by HMS Norfolk, HMS Marlborough, and HMS Grafton; three Type 23-class vessels purchased from the British Royal Navy. Both frigates are currently in active service with Ecuadorian Navy as BAE Morán Valverde (FM-01) and BAE Presidente Eloy Alfaro (FM-02).

== See also ==
- Chilean ship Almirante Condell, a list of ships with this name
- List of frigate classes by country

Equivalent frigates of the same era

- Alpino class
- Peder Skram class
- Van Speijk class
- Brooke class
- Nilgiri class
