= Chilean frigate Almirante Lynch (PFG-07) =

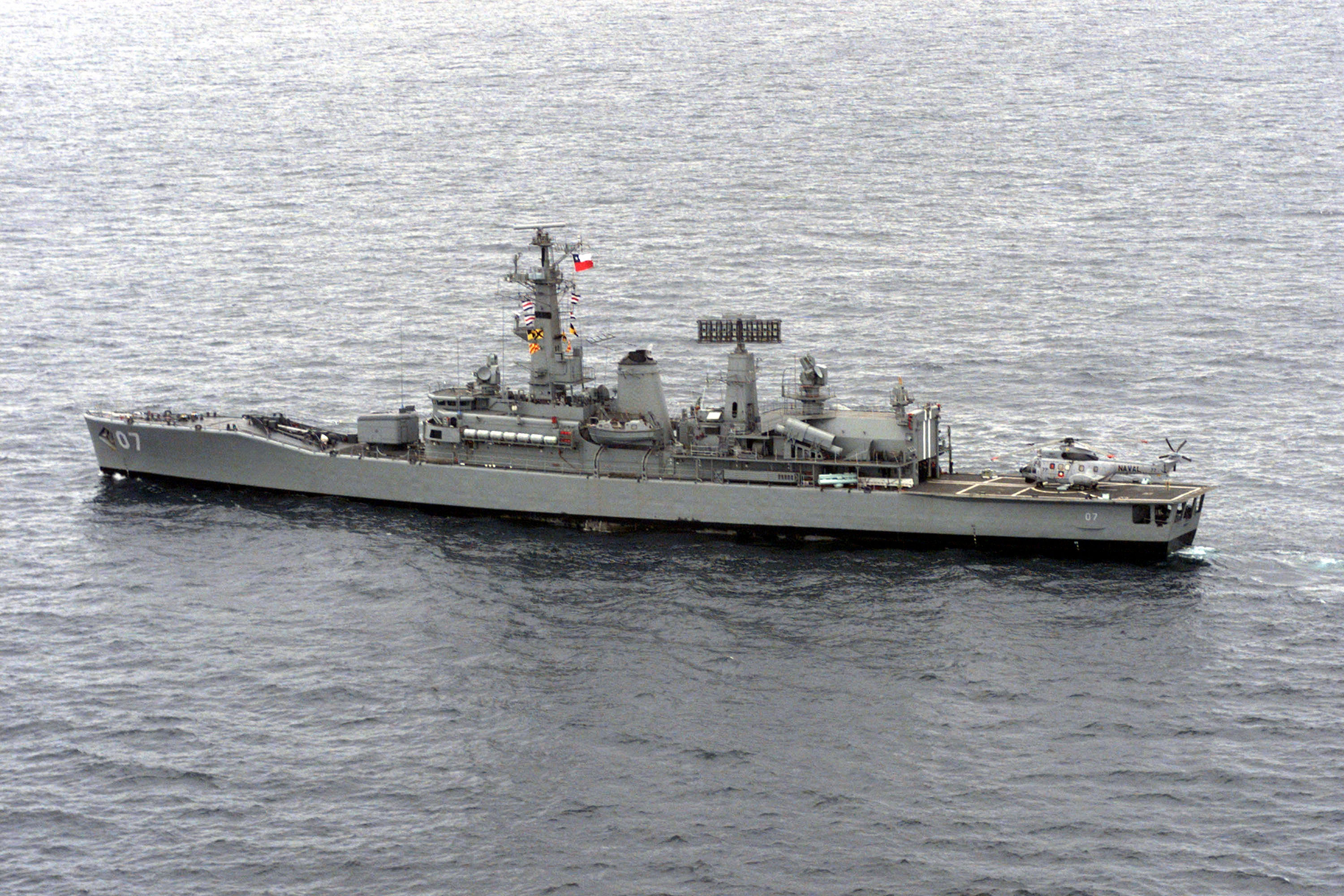
- Almirante Lynch off the coast of Chile on 30 June 1999

History

Chile
- Name: Almirante Lynch
- Namesake: Patricio Lynch
- Builder: Yarrow Shipbuilders, Glasgow, Scotland
- Laid down: December 1971
- Launched: 6 December 1972
- Commissioned: 25 May 1974
- Decommissioned: 4 July 2007
- Fate: Sold to Ecuador, March 2008

Ecuador
- Name: Morán Valverde
- Acquired: March 2008
- Status: ship in active service

General characteristics
- Class & type: Condell-class frigate
- Displacement: 2,500 long tons (2,540 t)
- Length: 372 ft (113 m)
- Beam: 41 ft (12 m)
- Draught: 18 ft (5.5 m)
- Propulsion: 2 shafts, 2 White/English Electric steam turbines, 2 Babcock & Wilcox boilers,30,000 hp (22 MW)
- Speed: 29 knots (54 km/h; 33 mph)
- Range: 4,500 nmi (8,300 km) at 12 kn (22 km/h; 14 mph)
- Complement: 250
- Sensors & processing systems: SISDEF Imagen SP 100 CMS; Type 184P hull sonar; Type 1006 navigation radar; Type 965 air-search; Elta EL/M-2221GM fire control
- Armament: 1 × twin mount 4.5 in (114 mm) gun; 4 × Exocet launchers; 2 × Oerlikon 20 mm cannon; 1 × CIWS Vulcan Phalanx; 2 × Mk.32 triple torpedo tubes
- Aircraft carried: 1 × Bell 412 helicopter

The Chilean frigate Almirante Lynch (PFG-07) is a Condell-class frigate, the third ship of the Chilean Navy to bear the name.

Her keel was laid down in December 1971, and she was launched on 6 December 1972, completed and delivered to the Chilean Navy on 25 May 1974.

She set sail for Chile after completing a period of training with the Royal Navy, arriving in Valparaíso on 14 February 1975. In active reserve from 14 December 2006, she was decommissioned on 4 July 2007.

In March 2008, Almirante Lynch and sister ship Almirante Condell were sold to Ecuador. The former Almirante Lynch is in active service under the name BAE Morán Valverde.

== Bibliography ==
- Saunders, Stephen, ed. (2004). Jane's Fighting Ships 2004–2005. Coulsdon, UK: Jane's Information Group. ISBN 0-7106-2623-1.
