= HMS Danae (F47) =

Type 12I or Leander-class frigate of the Royal Navy and Ecuadorian Navy

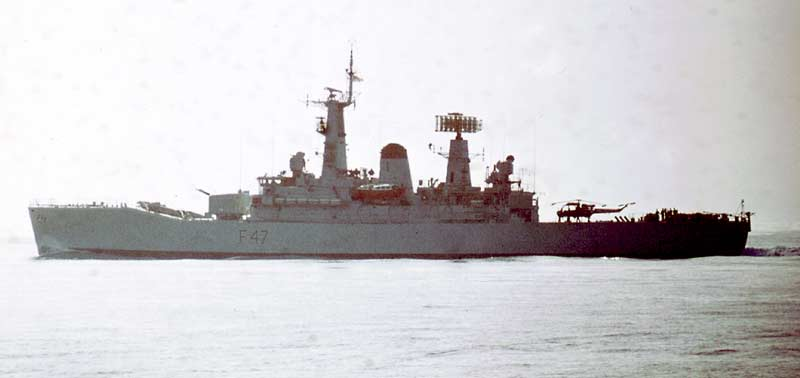
- HMS Danae in January 1970

History

United Kingdom
- Name: HMS Danae
- Builder: Devonport Dockyard
- Laid down: 16 December 1964
- Launched: 31 October 1965
- Commissioned: 10 October 1967
- Decommissioned: 1991
- Identification: Pennant number: F47
- Motto: Timeant Daneios; ("Let them fear those belonging to Danae")
- Fate: Sold to Ecuadorian Navy

Ecuador
- Name: BAE Morán Valverde
- Commissioned: 1991
- Decommissioned: October 2008
- Identification: Hull number: FM 02

General characteristics
- Class & type: Leander-class frigate
- Displacement: 3,200 long tons (3,251 t) full load
- Length: 113.4 m (372 ft)
- Beam: 12.5 m (41 ft)
- Draught: 5.8 m (19 ft)
- Propulsion: 2 × Babcock & Wilcox boilers supplying steam to two sets of White-English Electric double-reduction geared turbines to two shafts
- Speed: 28 knots (52 km/h)
- Range: 4,600 nautical miles (8,500 km) at 15 knots (28 km/h)
- Complement: 223
- Armament: As built: 1 × twin 4.5 inch (114 mm) guns; 1 × quadruple Sea Cat anti-aircraft missile launchers; 1 × Limbo anti-submarine mortar; From 1980: 4 × Exocet anti-ship missile launchers; 3 × quadruple Seacat anti-aircraft missile launchers; 2 × single 40 mm Bofors anti-aircraft guns; 2 × triple torpedo tubes
- Aircraft carried: 1 × Westland Wasp helicopter; From 1980: 1 × Lynx helicopter

HMS Danae was a Leander-class frigate of the Royal Navy. She was, like the rest of the class, named after a figure of mythology. Danae was built by Devonport Dockyard. She was launched on 31 October 1965 and commissioned on 10 October 1967.

== Construction ==
Danae was ordered during 1963 as one of three Leanders built under the 1963–1964. The ship was laid down at Devonport Dockyard on 16 December 1964, was launched on 31 October 1965 and completed on 7 September 1967. She commissioned with the Pennant number F47 on 10 October 1967.

Danae was 372 feet (113.4 m) long overall and 360 feet (109.7 m) at the waterline, with a beam of 41 feet (12.5 m) and a maximum draught of 18 feet (5.5 m). Displacement was 2,380 long tons (2,420 t) standard and 2,860 long tons (2,910 t) full load. The ship was fitted with Y-136 machinery, built by J. Samuel White. Two oil-fired Babcock & Wilcox boilers fed steam at 550 pounds per square inch (3,800 kPa) and 850 °F (454 °C) to a pair of double reduction geared steam turbines that in turn drove two propeller shafts, with the machinery rated at 30,000 shaft horsepower (22,000 kW), giving a speed of 28 knots (52 km/h; 32 mph).

A twin 4.5-inch (113 mm) Mark 6 gun mount was fitted forward. Anti-aircraft defence was provided by a quadruple Sea Cat surface-to-air missile launcher on the hangar roof, while two Oerlikon 20 mm cannon for close-in defence against surface targets. A Limbo anti-submarine mortar was fitted aft to provide a short-range anti-submarine capability, while a hangar and helicopter deck allowed a single Westland Wasp helicopter to be operated, for longer range anti-submarine and anti-surface operations.

As built, Danae was fitted with a large Type 965 long range air search radar on the ship's mainmast, with a Type 993 short range air/surface target indicating radar and Type 974 navigation radar carried on the ship's foremast. An MRS3 fire control system was carried over the ship's bridge to direct the 4.5-inch guns, while a GWS22 director for Seacat was mounted on the hangar roof. The ship had a sonar suite of Type 177 or 184 medium range search sonar, Type 162 bottom search and Type 170 attack sonar. While Danae was fitted with a well to accommodate Type 199 variable depth sonar, it was never fitted.

== Royal Navy service ==
In 1968, Danae became a Gibraltar guardship and later joined HMY Britannia in South America to perform royal escort duties. Danae subsequently undertook a Beira Patrol, which was designed to prevent oil reaching landlocked Rhodesia via the then Portuguese colony of Mozambique, of which the port of Beira there gave its name to the operation. Danae deployed to the Far East visiting Australia, New Zealand and Japan, and remained in that region until the middle of 1969. She then undertook another Beira Patrol (a routine duty for the Royal Navy until it was stopped in 1975) and finally returned to Devonport in October 1969, having been deployed for 12 months.

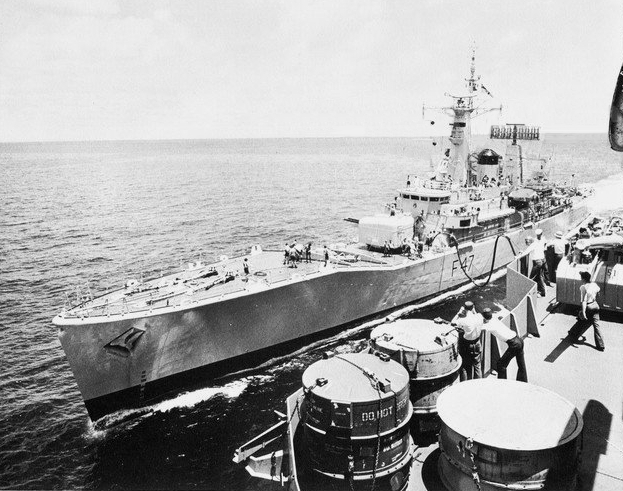
HMS Danae refuelling from USS Kearsarge, 1969

In 1974, Danae deployed to the Far East via South Africa, the Red Sea and the Persian Gulf. The following year, Danae performed a variety of duties while in the North Atlantic including oil-rig and fishery protection. She became a member (later flagship) of the NATO Standing Naval Force Atlantic, shadowing the Russian Navy's Ocean 75 exercise.

During the 1970s, Danae was one of the Leander-class frigates used as the fictional "HMS Hero" for the popular TV drama series Warship. The BBC's children's television programme "Blue Peter" featured Warship being filmed at Plymouth Dockyard on board Danae, with Lesley Judd in 1975. Six episodes of Warship were filmed aboard Danae around that time.

In 1977, Danae took part in the Royal Navy Fleet Review to celebrate HM the Queen's Silver Jubilee. Danae was placed between her sister ship Euryalus and Antelope.

In August 1977, Danae started a major reconstruction at Devonport Dockyard. The conversion included the removal and replacement of all the ship's armament. The Mark 6 4.5-in gun mount was replaced by four Exocet anti-ship missiles. The Limbo anti-submarine mortar was removed to give a larger flight deck and the ship's hangar was enlarged to allow a Westland Lynx helicopter to be operated, while two triple STWS torpedo tubes provided short range anti-submarine capability. Anti-aircraft armament consisted of one Seacat launcher mounted forward of the Exocet containers and two more mounted aft on the hangar roof, backed up by two Bofors 40 mm anti-aircraft guns on the bridge wings. Type 1006 navigation radar replaced the old Type 974 radar, while the MRS3 gun control director as replaced by a GWS22 director for the forward Seacat launcher, with a second Seacat director mounted aft. Type 184M sonar replaced the main hull sonar, while the VDS was removed and its well plated over. Displacement rose to 2,700 long tons (2,700 t) standard and 3,200 long tons (3,300 t), with speed falling by two knots. The modernisation was completed in September 1980.

In January 1982, Danae joined NATO's Standing Naval Force North Atlantic on a six-month assignment and in June that year, in the aftermath of the Falklands War, deployed as part of the escort of the carrier Illustrious when she deployed to the South Atlantic, returning to Devonport in October 1982. In June–July 1983 Danae had her close-in anti-aircraft armament strengthened as a result of operational experience in the Falklands. A twin Oerlikon 20 mm cannon mount was fitted aft, while two single Oerlikon 20 mm guns, in BMARC GAM BO1 mounts, replaced the ship's boats amidships, and improved launchers for chaff and flares were fitted. Following this modification, the ship returned to the South Atlantic to undertake a Falkland Islands patrol, at a time when that region was still very tense. In 1985, Danae made yet another journey to the South Atlantic. In the late 1980s the ship became ever more active with NATO's multi-national squadrons, though she was beginning to show signs of her increasing age.

== Ecuadorian service ==
In 1991, Danae was decommissioned from the Royal Navy and was sold to the Ecuadorian Navy, along with Penelope, on 25 April 1991.Danae's torpedo tubes were removed before transfer, and the sale did not include Exocet or Seacat missiles. Danae was renamed BAE Morán Valverde in Ecuadorian service, with the Pennant Number FM-01. Morán Valverde had Exocet missiles restored in Ecuadorian service, while three twin SIMBAD launchers for Mistral anti-aircraft missiles replaced the Seacat launchers. The ship was re-fitted with six anti-submarine torpedo tubes, launching Italian Whitehead A244 torpedoes (These torpedo tubes had been removed from two Esmeraldas-class corvettes.

In 2002, Jane's Fighting Ships noted that both Ecuadorian Leanders suffered from engine problems, with replacement of the ships' steam turbines with diesel engines being considered, and that sea time of the two frigates was limited. Morán Valverde was decommissioned in October 2008. In September 2010 she was taken into Andec Dock Ecuador to be scrapped, a process which was expected to be complete by March 2011.

== Publications ==
- Burden, Rodney A.; Draper, Michael I.; Rough, Douglas A.; Smith, Colin R.; Wilton, David (1986). Falklands: The Air War. British Aviation Research Group. ISBN 0-906339-05-7.
- Colledge, J. J.; Warlow, Ben (2006) [1969]. Ships of the Royal Navy: The Complete Record of All Fighting Ships of the Royal Navy from the 15th Century to the Present (3rd Rev ed.). London: Chatham Publishing. ISBN 978-1-86176-281-8. OCLC 67375475.
- Couhat, Jean Labayle; Baker, A. D., eds. (1986). Combat Fleets of the World 1986/87. Annapolis, Maryland, USA: Naval Institute Press. ISBN 0-85368-860-5.
- Critchley, Mike (1992). British Warships Since 1945: Part 5: Frigates. Liskeard, UK: Maritime Press. ISBN 0-907771-13-0.
- Friedman, Norman (2008). British Destroyers & Frigates: The Second World War and After. Barnsley, UK: Seaforth Publishing. ISBN 978-1-84832-015-4.
- Gardiner, Robert; Chumbley, Stephen, eds. (1995). Conway's All the World's Fighting Ships 1947–1995. Annapolis, Maryland, US: Naval Institute Press. ISBN 1-55750-132-7.
- Marriott, Leo (1983). Royal Navy Frigates 1945–1983. Shepperton, Surrey, UK: Ian Allan Ltd. ISBN 0-7110-1322-5.
- Moore, John, ed. (1979). Jane's Fighting Ships 1979–1980. London: Jane's Yearbooks. ISBN 0-354-00587-1.
- Moore, John, ed. (1985). Jane's Fighting Ships 1985–1986. London: Jane's Yearbooks. ISBN 0-7106-0814-4.
- Prézelin, Bernard; A.D. Baker III, eds. (1990). The Naval Institute Guide to Combat Fleets of the World 1990/1991. Annapolis, Maryland, USA: Naval Institute Press. ISBN 0-87021-250-8.
- Osborne, Richard; Sowdon, David (1990). Leander Class Frigates. Kendal, UK: World Ships Society. ISBN 0-905617-56-8.
- Saunders, Stephen, ed. (2002). Jane's Fighting Ships 2002–2003. Coulsdon, UK: Jane's Information Group. ISBN 0710624328.
- Sturtivant, Ray; Ballance, Theo (1994). The Squadrons of the Fleet Air Arm. Tonbridge, Kent, UK: Air Britain (Historians). ISBN 0-85130-223-8.
