= Chilean frigate Almirante Condell (PFG-06) =

Chilean frigate

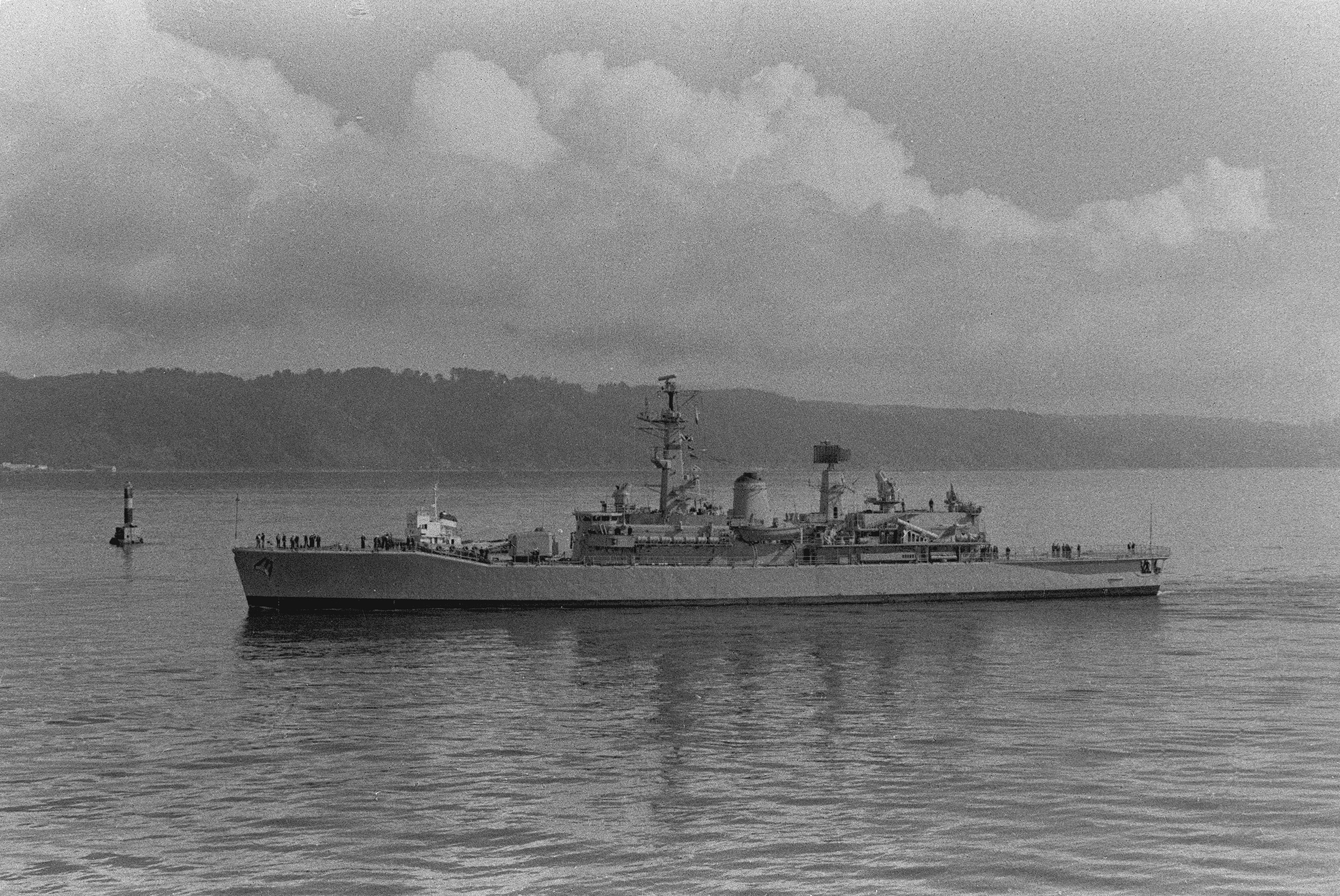
- Chilean frigate Almirante Condell (PFG-06)

History

Chile
- Name: Almirante Condell
- Namesake: Admiral Carlos Condell
- Builder: Yarrow Shipbuilders, Glasgow, Scotland
- Laid down: 5 June 1971
- Launched: 12 June 1972
- Christened: Almirante Condell 3, PFG-06
- Commissioned: 21 December 1973
- Decommissioned: 11 December 2007
- Fate: Sold to Ecuador, March 2008

Ecuador
- Name: Eloy Alfaro
- Namesake: Eloy Alfaro
- Acquired: March 2008

General characteristics
- Class & type: Condell-class frigate
- Displacement: 2,500 long tons (2,540 t) standard 2,962 long tons (3,010 t) full load
- Length: 372 ft (113.4 m) oa; 360 ft (109.7 m) waterline
- Beam: 43 ft (13.1 m)
- Draught: 18 ft (5.5 m)
- Propulsion: 2 shafts, 2 White/English Electric steam turbines, 2 Babcock & Wilcox boilers,30,000 hp (22 MW)
- Speed: 29 knots (54 km/h; 33 mph)
- Range: 4,500 nmi (8,300 km) at 12 kn (22 km/h; 14 mph)
- Complement: 263
- Sensors & processing systems: SISDEF Imagen SP 100 Combat Data System; Type 184M/P medium-frequency hull search/attack sonar; Type 170B high frequency hull mounted attack sonar; Type 162 M high-frequency classification sonar; Type 1006 I-band navigation radar; Type 965 air-search radar; Type 992Q surface-search radar; Type 904 Seacat fire control; Type 903 gun fire control
- Armament: 1 × twin mount 4.5 in (114 mm) gun; 4 × Exocet anti-ship missile launchers; 1 × quadruple Sea Cat surface-to-air missile launcher, 16 missiles; 4 × Oerlikon 20 mm cannon; 2 × Mk.32 triple torpedo tubes
- Aircraft carried: 1 × Eurocopter AS532 Cougar helicopter

Chilean frigate Almirante Condell (PFG-06) was a Condell-class frigate of the Chilean Navy, and was the third ship in the Chilean Navy to bear this name.

She is a modified Leander-class frigate ordered by the Chilean government on 14 January 1970 as an ASW frigate, together with Almirante Lynch. The class was built between 1969 and 1973, under Chilean modifications at Yarrow Shipbuilders in Scotstoun, Glasgow. Almirante Condell was delivered to Chile in 1973. She was decommissioned on 11 December 2007.

In March 2008, she was sold to Ecuador, along with her sister ship Almirante Lynch, and renamed BAE Eloy Alfaro (FM 01). Both ships were handed over to the Navy of Ecuador on 18 April 2008.
