= List of ship launches in 1928 =

The list of ship launches in 1928 is a chronological list of ships launched in 1928.

Date	Ship	Class / type	Builder	Location	Country	Notes
5 January	Alster	Cargo liner	Deutsche Werft	Hamburg	Germany	For Norddeutscher Lloyd
11 January	El Argentino	Cargo ship	Fairfield Shipbuilding and Engineering Company	Govan	United Kingdom	For the Houlder Line
24 January	Dagomba	Cargo ship	Harland & Wolff	Belfast	United Kingdom	For Elder Dempster.
24 January	Duchess of Bedford	Ocean liner	John Brown & Company	Clydebank	United Kingdom	For Canadian Pacific Steamships Ltd
26 January	King Neptune	Cargo ship	Harland & Wolff	Belfast	United Kingdom	For King Line.
10 February	Deal	Ferry	Harland & Wolff	Belfast	United Kingdom	For Southern Railway.
21 February	Punta Benitez	Tanker	Harland & Wolff	Belfast	United Kingdom	For Lago Shipping Co.
21 February	Saugor	Cargo ship	Harland & Wolff	Belfast	United Kingdom	For James Nourse Ltd.
22 February	Sussex	County-class cruiser	Hawthorn, Leslie	Hebburn	United Kingdom	For Royal Navy
23 February	Albatross	Seaplane tender	Cockatoo Docks and Engineering Company	Sydney	Australia	For Royal Australian Navy
4 March	C-2	C-class submarine	SECN	Cartagena	Spain	For Spanish Navy
8 March	Tia Juana	Tanker	Harland & Wolff	Belfast	United Kingdom	For Lago Shipping Co.
20 March	Shirayuki	Fubuki-class destroyer	Yokohama Shipyards		Japan	For Imperial Japanese Navy
22 March	King Arthur	Cargo ship	Harland & Wolff	Belfast	United Kingdom	For King Line.
23 March	I-56 (I-156)	Kaidai III-type submarine	Kure Naval Arsenal	Kure	Japan	For Imperial Japanese Navy
24 March	Haguro	Myōkō-class cruiser	Mitsubishi Shipyard	Nagasaki	Japan	For Imperial Japanese Navy
27 March	Hooiberg	Tanker	Harland & Wolff	Belfast	United Kingdom	For Lago Shipping Co.
14 April	Enrico Toti	Balilla-class submarine	Odero-Terni-Orlando Naval Yard	La Spezia	Italy	For Regia Marina
19 April	Delfina Mitre	Train ferry	Harland & Wolff	Belfast	United Kingdom	For Entre Ríos Railway Co.
20 April	Colbert	Suffren-class cruiser	Brest Naval Yard	Brest	France	For Marine Nationale
22 April	Ashigara	Myōkō-class cruiser	Kawasaki shipyard	Kobe	Japan	For Imperial Japanese Navy
23 April	Clydefield	Tanker	Harland & Wolff	Belfast	United Kingdom	For Hunting & Sons.
23 April	Punta Gorda	Tanker	Harland & Wolff	Belfast	United Kingdom	For Lago Shipping Co.
24 April	King Stephen	Cargo ship	Harland & Wolff	Belfast	United Kingdom	For King Line.
3 May	Highland Monarch	Passenger ship	Harland & Wolff	Belfast	United Kingdom	For H. & W. Nelson Ltd.
3 May	Worthing	Passenger ferry			United Kingdom	For Southern Railway
5 May	Odin	Odin-class submarine	Chatham Dockyard	Chatham, Kent	United Kingdom	
6 May	St. Louis	Ocean liner	Bremer-Vulkan Shipyards	Bremen	Germany	For Hamburg-America Line
7 May	St. Roch	Schooner	Burrard Dry Dock	North Vancouver, British Columbia	Canada	For Royal Canadian Mounted Police
17 May	Brittany	Cargo ship	Harland & Wolff	Belfast	United Kingdom	For David MacIver & Co.
17 May	Nyanza	Cargo ship	Harland & Wolff	Belfast	United Kingdom	For MacLay & MacIntyre Ltd.
19 May	King William	Cargo ship	Harland & Wolff	Belfast	United Kingdom	For King Line.
22 May	Yamanota	Tanker	Harland & Wolff	Belfast	United Kingdom	For Lago Shipping Co.
23 May	Köln	Königsberg-class cruiser (1927)	Kriegsmarinewerft	Wilhelmshaven	Germany	For Reichsmarine
3 June	Éridan	Cargo liner	Société Provençale de Construction Navales	La Ciotat	France	For Société des Services Contractuels des Messageries Maritimes
14 June	Richard C. Krogmann	Fishing trawler	Schiffbau-Gesellschaft Unterweser	Wesermünde-Lehe	Germany	For Cuxhavener Hochseefischerei AG.
18 June	Duchess of Richmond	Ocean liner	John Brown & Company	Clydebank	United Kingdom	For Canadian Pacific Steamships Ltd
21 June	Highland Chieftain	Passenger ship	Harland & Wolff	Belfast	United Kingdom	For H. & W. Nelson Ltd.
26 June	Centura	Lighter	Harland & Wolff	Belfast	United Kingdom	For Argentine Navigation Co.
26 June	Miyuki	Fubuki-class destroyer	Uraga Dock Company	Uraga	Japan	For Imperial Japanese Navy
3 July	Designer	Cargo ship	Harland & Wolff	Belfast	United Kingdom	For T. & J. Harrison Ltd.
5 July	Cuidad de Salto	Passenger ship	Harland & Wolff	Belfast	United Kingdom	For Argentine Navigation Co.
5 July	Shropshire	County-class cruiser	William Beardmore & Company	Dalmuir	United Kingdom	For Royal Navy
8 July	Norfolk	County-class cruiser	Fairfield Shipbuilding & Engineering Co. Ltd	Govan	United Kingdom	For Royal Navy
10 July	Pascal	Redoutable-class submarine	Arsenal de Brest	Brest	France	For French Navy
10 July	Wicher	Wicher-class destroyer	Chantiers Naval Français		France	For Marynarka Wojenna Rzeczypospolitej Polskeij
17 July	York	York-class cruiser	Palmers Shipbuilding and Iron Company	Jarrow	United Kingdom	For Royal Navy
18 July	Energie	Tanker	Isaac J. Abdela & Mitchell (1925) Ltd.	Queensferry	United Kingdom	For Medway Oil & Storage Co. Ltd.
18 July	Port Fairy	cargo ship	Swan, Hunter & Wigham Richardson	Wallsend	United Kingdom	For Commonwealth & Dominion Line Ltd
19 July	Medway	Submarine depot ship	Vickers Armstrong	Barrow in Furness	United Kingdom	For Royal Navy
21 July	Hyatt	Serrano-class destroyer	John I. Thorneycroft & Company	Woolston	United Kingdom	For Armada de Chile
2 August	Bremen	Ocean liner	Deutsche Schiff- und Maschinenbau AG	Bremen	Germany	For Norddeutscher Lloyd
15 August	Europa		Blohm + Voss	Hamburg	Germany	For Norddeutscher Lloyd
16 August	Behar	Cargo ship	Harland & Wolff	Belfast	United Kingdom	For Hain Steamship Co.
19 August	Pasteur	Redoutable-class submarine	Arsenal de Brest	Brest	France	For French Navy
21 August	Kerma	Cargo ship	Harland & Wolff	Belfast	United Kingdom	For Strick Line.
15 September	Viceroy of India	Ocean liner	Alexander Stephen & Sons	Glasgow	United Kingdom	For Peninsular and Oriental Steam Navigation Company
17 September	Dr. Rudolf Wahrendorff	Fishing trawler	Deschimag Seebeckwerke	Wesermünde	Germany	For Grundmann & Gröschel
27 September	Murakumo	Fubuki-class destroyer	Fujinagata Shipyards	Osaka	Japan	
28 September	Duchess of York	Ocean liner	John Brown & Company	Clydebank	United Kingdom	For Canadian Pacific Steamships Ltd
29 September	Hatsuyuki	Fubuki-class destroyer	Maizuru Naval Arsenal	Maizuru, Kyoto	Japan	For Imperial Japanese Navy
1 October	I-57 (I-157)	Kaidai III-type submarine	Kure Naval Arsenal	Kure	Japan	For Imperial Japanese Navy
1 November	Highland Brigade	Passenger ship	Harland & Wolff	Belfast	United Kingdom	For H. & W. Nelson Ltd.
15 November	Celtic Monarch	Cargo ship	Harland & Wolff	Belfast	United Kingdom	For Raeburn & Verel Ltd.
24 November	Holy Cross	Trawler	Bath Iron Works	Bath, Maine	United States	For F J O'Hara & Sons Inc.
28 November	Aldea	Serrano-class destroyer	John I. Thornycroft & Company	Woolston	United Kingdom	For Armada de Chile
29 November	Uranami	Fubuki-class destroyer	Uraga Dock Company	Uraga	Japan	For Imperial Japanese Navy
11 December	Olympus	Odin-class submarine	William Beardmore and Company	Glasgow	United Kingdom	For Royal Navy
12 December	Bhutan	Cargo ship	Harland & Wolff	Belfast	United Kingdom	For Hain Steamship Co.
13 December	Canterbury	Ferry	William Denny and Brothers	Dumbarton	United Kingdom	For Southern Railway.
15 December	Georgetown	Trawler	Bath Iron Works	Bath, Maine	United States	For F J O'Hara & Sons Inc.
17 December	Narwhal	Narwhal-class submarine	Portsmouth Naval Shipyard	Kittery, Maine	United States	For United States Navy
21 December	Idomo	Motor lighter	Harland & Wolff	Belfast	United Kingdom	For Elder Dempster.
Unknown date	Aelybryn	Cargo ship	Lithgows Ltd.	Port Glasgow	United Kingdom	For private owner.
Unknown date	Barnett	McCawley-class attack transport	Furness Shipbuilding Co Ltd	Haverton Hill-on-Tees	United Kingdom	For the United States Navy
Unknown date	Boston College	Trawler	Bath Iron Works	Bath, Maine	United States	
Unknown date	Coronet	Steam yacht	Germainia Werft	Kiel	Germany	For Irving T. Bush
Unknown date	Eaglescliffe Hall	cargo ship	Smith's Dock Co	Middlesbrough	United Kingdom	For Hall Corporation
Unknown date	Egglestone	Cargo ship	W Gray & Co Ltd	West Hartlepool	United Kingdom	
Unknown date	Elfrecia	Steam yacht	Defoe Shipbuilding Co	Bay City, Michigan	United States	
Unknown date	City of Dieppe	Steamship	William Gray & Co. (1918) Ltd.	West Hartlepool	United Kingdom	For Ellerman Lines.
Unknown date	Gemma	Cargo ship	Flensburger Schiffbau-Gesellschaft	Flensburg	Germany	For Holm & Molzen
Unknown date	Goodleigh	Cargo ship	J L Thompson & Sons Ltd	Sunderland	United Kingdom	For Dulverton Steamship Co Ltd
Unknown date	Hydrographer	Survey ship	Spear Engine Works	Norfolk, Virginia	United States	For United States Coast and Geodetic Survey
Unknown date	Meuse	Cargo ship	J. Koster.	Groningen	Netherlands	For private owner.
Unknown date	Miss England I	Power boat	British Power Boat Company	Southampton	United Kingdom	For Hubert Scott-Paine
Unknown date	Queen Anne	Motor yacht	Germania Werft	Kiel	Germany	For Isaac Edward Emerson
Unknown date	Rodi	Cargo ship	Bremer Vulkan Schiff- und Maschinenbau	Bremen	Germany	For Societa Anonima Adriatica Navigazione.
Unknown date	Savarona	Steam yacht	Pusey & Jones	Wilmington, Delaware	United States	For Mrs Thomas S Cadwallader
Unknown date	Spindrift		F F Pendleton	Wiscasset, Maine	United States	
Unknown date	T.C.I.S.G. No. 5	Barge	Alabama Drydock and Shipbuilding Company	Mobile, Alabama	United States	For Tennessee Coal, Iron and Railroad Company.
Unknown date	T.C.I.S.G. No. 6	Barge	Alabama Drydock and Shipbuilding Company	Mobile, Alabama	United States	For Tennessee Coal, Iron and Railroad Company.
Unknown date	T.C.I.S.G. No. 7	Barge	Alabama Drydock and Shipbuilding Company	Mobile, Alabama	United States	For Tennessee Coal, Iron and Railroad Company.
Unknown date	T.C.I.S.G. No. 8	Barge	Alabama Drydock and Shipbuilding Company	Mobile, Alabama	United States	For Tennessee Coal, Iron and Railroad Company.
Unknown date	T.C.I.S.G. No. 9	Barge	Alabama Drydock and Shipbuilding Company	Mobile, Alabama	United States	For Tennessee Coal, Iron and Railroad Company.
Unknown date	Trimont		Bethlehem Shipbuilding	Quincy, Massachusetts	United States	
Unknown date	Treuenfels	Cargo ship	Deutsche Schiff- und Maschinenbau.	Bremen	Germany	For Hansa Line.
Unknown date	Ubena	Passenger ship	Blohm & Voss.	Hamburg	Germany	For Deutsche East Africa Line.
Unknown date	WGN 67	Barge	Alabama Drydock and Shipbuilding Company	Mobile, Alabama	United States	For Warrior & Gulf Navigation Company.
Unknown date	WGN 68	Barge	Alabama Drydock and Shipbuilding Company	Mobile, Alabama	United States	For Warrior & Gulf Navigation Company.
Unknown date	WGN 69	Barge	Alabama Drydock and Shipbuilding Company	Mobile, Alabama	United States	For Warrior & Gulf Navigation Company.
Unknown date	WGN 70	Barge	Alabama Drydock and Shipbuilding Company	Mobile, Alabama	United States	For Warrior & Gulf Navigation Company.
Unknown date	WGN 71	Barge	Alabama Drydock and Shipbuilding Company	Mobile, Alabama	United States	For Warrior & Gulf Navigation Company.
Unknown date	WGN 72	Barge	Alabama Drydock and Shipbuilding Company	Mobile, Alabama	United States	For Warrior & Gulf Navigation Company.
Unknown date	WGN 73	Barge	Alabama Drydock and Shipbuilding Company	Mobile, Alabama	United States	For Warrior & Gulf Navigation Company.
Unknown date	WGN 74	Barge	Alabama Drydock and Shipbuilding Company	Mobile, Alabama	United States	For Warrior & Gulf Navigation Company.
Unknown date	WGN 75	Barge	Alabama Drydock and Shipbuilding Company	Mobile, Alabama	United States	For Warrior & Gulf Navigation Company.
Unknown date	WGN 76	Barge	Alabama Drydock and Shipbuilding Company	Mobile, Alabama	United States	For Warrior & Gulf Navigation Company.
Unknown date	WGN 77	Barge	Alabama Drydock and Shipbuilding Company	Mobile, Alabama	United States	For Warrior & Gulf Navigation Company.
Unknown date	WGN 78	Barge	Alabama Drydock and Shipbuilding Company	Mobile, Alabama	United States	For Warrior & Gulf Navigation Company.
Unknown date	WGN 79	Barge	Alabama Drydock and Shipbuilding Company	Mobile, Alabama	United States	For Warrior & Gulf Navigation Company.
Unknown date	WGN 80	Barge	Alabama Drydock and Shipbuilding Company	Mobile, Alabama	United States	For Warrior & Gulf Navigation Company.
Unknown date	WGN 81	Barge	Alabama Drydock and Shipbuilding Company	Mobile, Alabama	United States	For Warrior & Gulf Navigation Company.
Unknown date	WGN 82	Barge	Alabama Drydock and Shipbuilding Company	Mobile, Alabama	United States	For Warrior & Gulf Navigation Company.
Unknown date	WGN 83	Barge	Alabama Drydock and Shipbuilding Company	Mobile, Alabama	United States	For Warrior & Gulf Navigation Company.
Unknown date	WGN 84	Barge	Alabama Drydock and Shipbuilding Company	Mobile, Alabama	United States	For Warrior & Gulf Navigation Company.
