= Kite-class minesweeper =

United States warship class

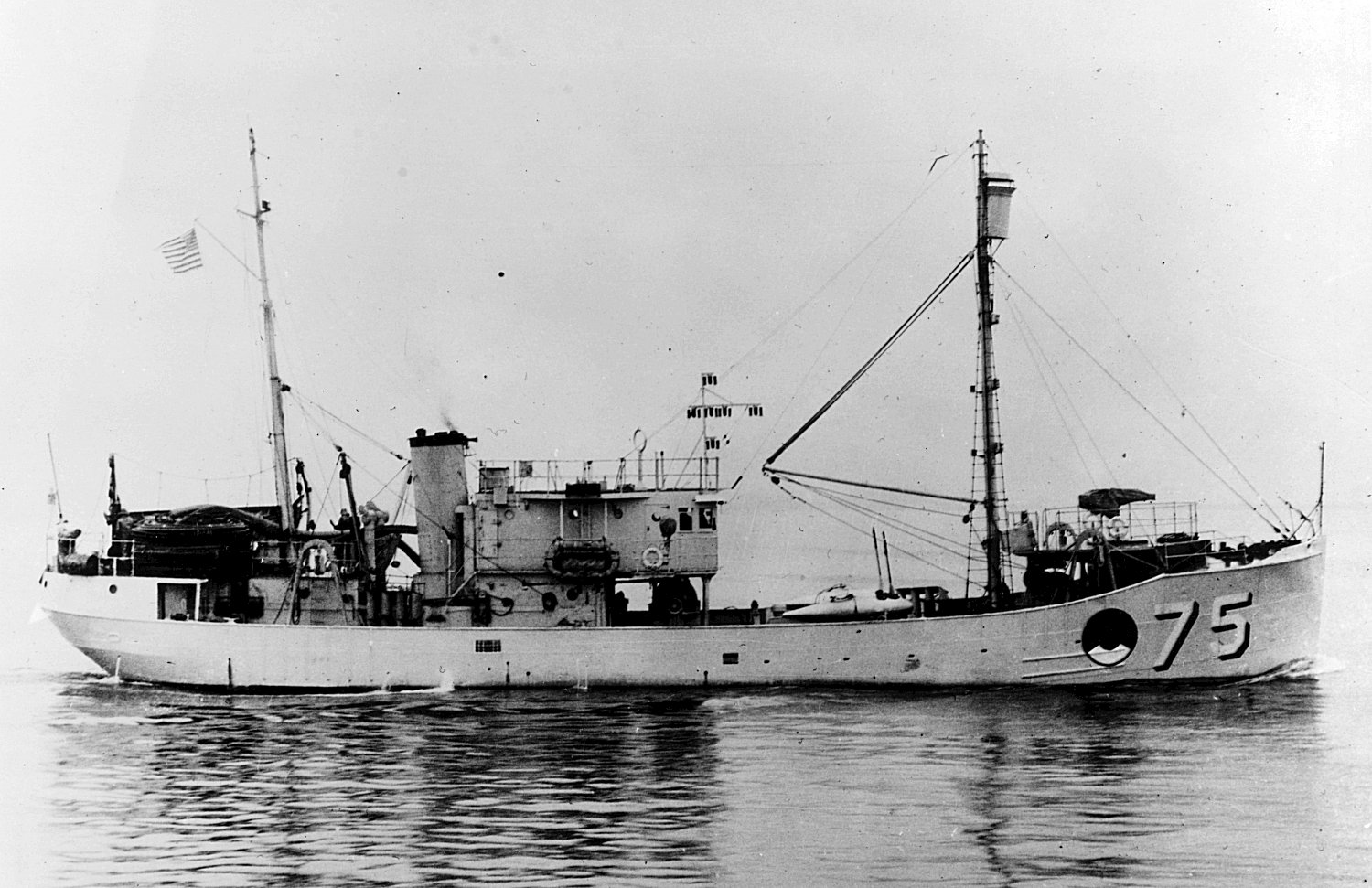
- Kite (AM-75)

Class overview
- Builders: Bath Iron Works, Bath, Maine
- Operators: United States
- In commission: 1941-1944
- Completed: 2

General characteristics
- Type: Minesweeper
- Displacement: 410 long tons (417 t)
- Length: 123 ft 10 in (37.74 m)
- Beam: 23 ft (7.0 m)
- Draft: 12 ft (3.7 m)
- Propulsion: 1 × 400 shp (298 kW) Fairbanks-Morse diesel engine; 1 × shaft
- Speed: 10 knots (19 km/h; 12 mph)
- Armament: 1 × 3"/50 caliber gun; 2 × .30 cal (7.62 mm) machine guns

The Kite-class minesweepers were a class of two ships operated by the United States Navy during World War II.

Three nearly identical ships were built as fishing trawlers in 1928 by the Bath Iron Works Corporation of Bath, Maine, for F. J. O'Hara and Sons, Inc. of Boston, Massachusetts.

The ships were acquired by the U.S. Navy in late 1940, and converted to minesweepers at Bethlehem Steel Co. of East Boston, Massachusetts, and commissioned in early 1941. Both were disposed of towards the end of the war.

== Ships ==
- USS Gull (AM-74) Yard #119, Boston College, U.S. official #228023
- USS Kite (AM-75) Yard #120, Holy Cross, U.S. official #228057
- USS Linnet (AM-76) Yard #121 Georgetown, U.S. official #228098

Boston College was slightly different with the next two identical in specification. As registered Boston College 241 GRT had a length between perpendiculars of length of 114.0 ft (34.7 m). The others 229 GRT had registered length between perpendiculars of 114.7 ft (35.0 m).
