= SS Royston Grange =

A number of steamships have been named Royston Grange, including:

- SS Royston Grange (1918)
- SS Royston Grange (1944)
- SS Royston Grange (1959)
