= SS British Transport =

English general cargo steamship

History

United Kingdom
- Name: British Transport
- Owner: Empire Transport Co Ltd
- Operator: Houlder Bros & Co Ltd
- Port of registry: West Hartlepool
- Builder: Sir Raylton Dixon & Co, Middlesbrough
- Yard number: 550
- Launched: 25 April 1910
- Completed: June 1910
- Identification: UK official number 127458; code letters HRBT
- Fate: Scrapped in Italy, July 1933

General characteristics
- Type: general cargo ship
- Tonnage: 4,143 GRT, 2,663 NRT, 7,200 DWT
- Length: 377 ft 6 in (115.1 m) length overall; 364.8 ft (111.2 m) registered length
- Beam: 51.1 ft (15.6 m)
- Draught: 23 ft 4 in (7.1 m)
- Depth: 26.1 ft (8.0 m)
- Decks: 1
- Installed power: 329 NHP
- Propulsion: triple expansion engine
- Speed: 10 knots (19 km/h)
- Armament: as DEMS: 1 × 4-inch gun
- Notes: one of at least six sister ships

SS British Transport was a general cargo steamship that was built in England in 1910 and scrapped in Italy in 1933. In 1917 she became the first merchant ship to succeed in sinking a U-boat.

== Building and technical details ==
British Transport was one of a class of at least six sister ships built in two shipyards in North East England in 1910.

In February 1910 the Northumberland Shipbuilding Company launched the cargo ship Amsterdam at Howdon on the River Tyne for the Furness, Withy shipping group, which owned Northumberland Shipbuilding. The same shipyard then launched sister ships to the same design: Algeriana in March and Graciana in April. These had been ordered by Furness, Withy, but were completed as Indian Transport and Cape Transport for the Empire Transport Company Ltd, which was part of Houlder Line. In May 1910 the same shipbuilder launched Natal Transport, also for Houlder Brothers' Empire Transport Co.

Each ship was propelled by a single screw, driven by a three-cylinder triple expansion engine built by Richardsons, Westgarth and Company at its works in Sunderland.

The Empire Transport Co ordered two sister ships to the same design from Sir Raylton Dixon and Company in Middlesbrough on the River Tees. British Transport was launched on 25 April and had her sea trials on 2 June. Canadian Transport was launched in June and completed in July. Richardsons, Westgarth and Co built the engine for each ship at its works in Middlesbrough. British Transport's engine was rated at 329 NHP, giving her a speed of about 10 knots (19 km/h).

British Transport was 377 ft 6 in (115.1 m) long overall and her registered length was 364.8 ft (111.2 m). Her beam was 51.1 ft (15.6 m) and her depth was 26.1 ft (8.0 m). Her tonnages were 4,143 GRT, 2,663 NRT and about 7,200 DWT.

British Transport had the UK official number 127458 and code letters HRBT. By 1930 she was equipped for wireless telegraphy.

== U-49 ==
In September 1917 British Transport left Brest, France with a cargo of munitions and other explosives for Archangel in Russia. At noon on 11 September the U-boat SM U-49 sighted British Transport in the Bay of Biscay. The U-boat was on the surface, and opened fire with her 88 mm deck gun. British Transport returned fire with her 4-inch gun, and the two vessels fought a gun duel for five hours.

After dark, U-49 continued to pursue British Transport. At 2100 hrs, the U-boat fired two torpedoes, but both missed. Half an hour later, British Transport sighted the phosphorescence of U-49's wake off her port bow. British Transport turned and rammed U-49, and then opened fire with her 4-inch gun, sinking the U-boat with all hands at 46°17′N 14°42′W.

== Awards ==
In February 1918, numerous members of British Transport's crew were decorated for sinking U-49. Her Master, Captain Alfred Pope, was made a Companion of the Distinguished Service Order. The DSO is an exclusively military order. Pope was commissioned as a temporary lieutenant in the Royal Naval Reserve for three years from December 1917, back-dated to 10 September 1917, to entitle him to the medal.

British Transport's Chief Officer, Second Officer and Chief Engineer were each awarded the DSC. Seven members of her crew were awarded the DSM and three were mentioned in dispatches.

The British Admiralty awarded £1,000, and an anonymous donor gave another £1,000 via Lloyd's Register. The Committee of Lloyd's and Houlder Brothers each added £250, the Ministry of Shipping gave Captain Pope £100 and a month's wages to each member of the crew.

Lloyd's of London later awarded Captain Pope its Silver Medal for Meritorious Services.

== Scrapping ==
On 13 July 1933 British Transport arrived at Pola in Italy to be scrapped.

== Bibliography ==
- Burrell, David (1992). Furness Withy 1891–1991. Kendal: World Ship Society. ISBN 0-905617-70-3.
- Haws, Duncan (2000). Manchester Liners, Houlders, Prince and Rio Cape Lines. Merchant Fleets in Profile. Vol. 38. TCL Publications. ISBN 978-0946378395.
- Stevens, Edward F (1950). One hundred years of Houlders. London: Mendip Press for Houlder Brothers.
