= Capitán Orella-class destroyer =

Chilean destroyer class

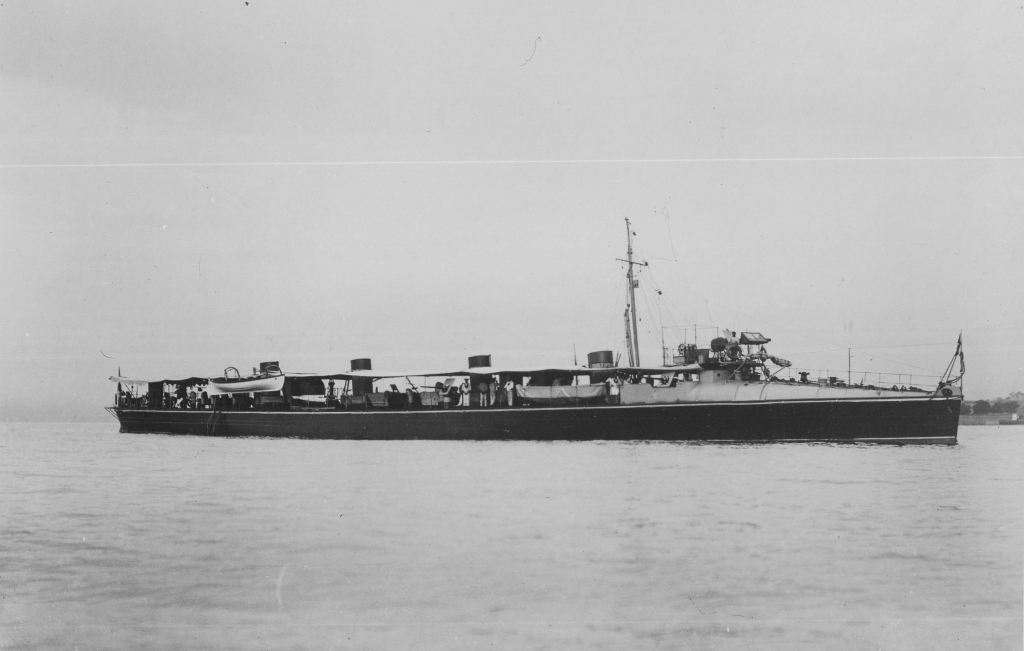
- Abeam view of Teniente Serrano in calm waters

Class overview
- Name: Capitán Orella class
- Builders: Cammell Laird, United Kingdom
- Operators: Chilean Navy
- Preceded by: None
- Succeeded by: Capitán Merino Jarpa class
- Built: 1896
- In service: ?–1924
- Completed: 4
- Scrapped: 4

General characteristics
- Type: Torpedo boat destroyers
- Displacement: 300 long tons (305 t)
- Length: 213 ft 0 in (64.92 m)
- Beam: 21 ft 6 in (6.55 m)
- Draft: 5 ft 10 in (1.79 m)
- Installed power: 6,250 ihp (4,660 kW)
- Propulsion: 2 × triple-expansion steam engines; Normand boilers; 2 propellers
- Speed: 30 knots (56 km/h; 35 mph) (design)
- Capacity: 90 long tons (91 t) of coal
- Complement: 65
- Armament: 1 × 3 in (76 mm) quick-firing gun; 5 × 6-pounder guns; 2 × 18 in (457 mm) torpedo tubes

The Capitán Orella class was a series of four torpedo boat destroyers constructed in the United Kingdom and operated by the Chilean Navy. All of the ships were built in 1898 and decommissioned in 1924. The design, based on existing destroyers of the Royal Navy, had several flaws and served as the basis for the next class of Chilean destroyers.

== Development and design ==
The torpedo boat destroyers were built by Cammell Laird in the United Kingdom based on the shipyard's 27-knot (50 km/h; 31 mph) design previously built for the Royal Navy. Unlike the British destroyers, the exported design featured four-cylinder engines and were sold to Russia and Chile. The Chilean Navy ordered four—Capitan Orella, Capitan Munez Gamero, Teniente Serrano, and Guardia-Marina Riquelme—which were built in 1896 and known as the Capitán Orella class.

The four destroyers had a length between perpendiculars of 213 feet 0 inches (64.92 m) with a beam of 21 feet 6 inches (6.55 m) and a draught of 5 feet 10 inches (1.79 m). They displaced 300 long tons (305 t) and carried a complement of 65. Propulsion was provided by two propellers powered by triple-expansion steam engines supplied by Normand boilers, which produced 6,250 indicated horsepower (4,660 kW) and gave the ships a design speed of 30 knots (56 km/h; 35 mph). During sea trialw, the vessels attained speeds of between 30.1 and 30.42 knots (55.75 and 56.34 km/h; 34.64 and 35.01 mph) while developing between 6,313 and 6,398 indicated horsepower (4,708 and 4,771 kW). They carried approximately 90 long tons (91 t) of coal. Armament consisted of one 3 in (76 mm) quick-firing gun, five 6-pounder guns, and two 18 in (457 mm) torpedo tubes mounted on trainable centreline mountings amidships and aft. The steel-hulled vessels featured a turtleback forecastle and four equally spaced raked funnels.

The ships, alongside others of the type built by Cammell Laird, were criticized for having a wide turning circle and squatting at high speeds. The Capitán Orella-class design was used as the basis for the next generation of Chilean destroyer, which entered service as the three Capitán Merino Jarpa class. A primary difference was the removal of one torpedo tube. Built in 1896, all four ships were stricken in 1924.

== Ships in class ==
Data
Name	Builder	Built	Fate
Capitan Orella	Cammell Laird	1896	Stricken 1924
Capitan Munez Gamero	Cammell Laird	1896	Stricken 1924
Teniente Serrano	Cammell Laird	1896	Stricken 1924
Guardia-Marina Riquelme	Cammell Laird	1896	Stricken 1924
