= USS Linnet (AM-76) =

Minesweeper of the United States Navy

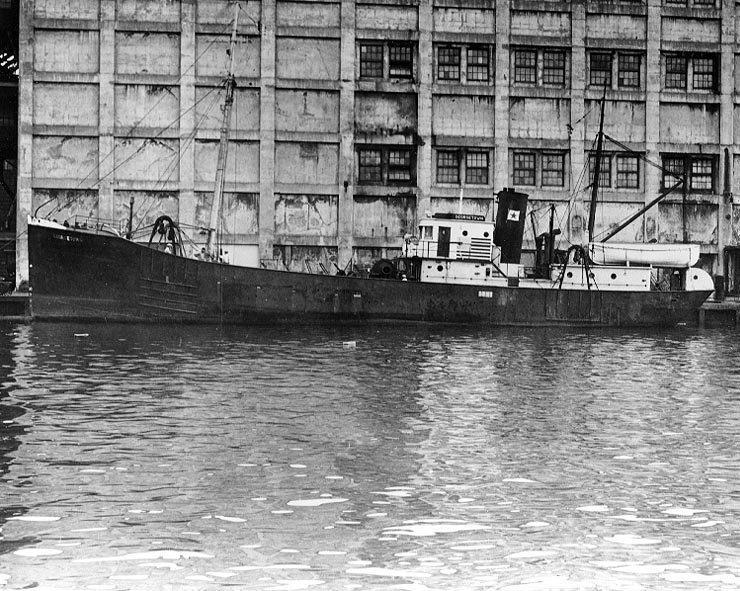

History

United States
- Name: USS Linnet
- Builder: Bath Iron Works, Bath, Maine
- Laid down: 18 June 1928
- Launched: 15 December 1928, as MV Georgetown
- Acquired: 4 September 1940
- Commissioned: 3 March 1941, as USS Linnet (AM-76)
- Decommissioned: 18 December 1944
- Renamed: Linnet, 14 August 1940
- Reclassified: Unclassified Miscellaneous Auxiliary, IX-166, 20 April 1944
- Fate: Returned to the War Shipping Administration, 31 July 1945

General characteristics
- Displacement: 410 long tons (417 t)
- Length: 123 ft 10 in (37.74 m)
- Beam: 23 ft (7.0 m)
- Draft: 12 ft (3.7 m)
- Propulsion: 1 × 400 shp (298 kW) Fairbanks-Morse diesel engine; 1 × shaft
- Speed: 10 knots (19 km/h; 12 mph)
- Armament: 1 × 3"/50 caliber gun; 2 × .30 caliber machine guns

USS Linnet (AM-76), was a minesweeper of the United States Navy during World War II.

The vessel was laid down on 18 June 1928 and built as the trawler Georgetown by the Bath Iron Works, Bath, Maine, in 1928 as third, yard number 121 and U.S. official number 228098, of three trawlers for F. J. O'Hara & Sons of Boston. Launching was on 15 December 1928 with delivey on 19 December 1928. The trawler was registered at 229 GRT with call sign MHCW, length of 114.7 ft (35.0 m) between perpendiculars of 400 h.p. with a crew of 19 designated as engaged in cod and mackerel fishing, owner Trawler Georgetown (Mass.).

During a blizzard in 1934 Georgetown sent a distress message from some 200 miles offshore. The USCGC Ossipee located the trawler and towed it to port.

== Navy acquisition ==
The trawler was acquired by the U.S. Navy on 4 September 1940 with conversion to a minesweeper begun in September 1940 at the Bethlehem Steel Co. of East Boston, Massachusetts. (Note: The photo of Georgetown as minesweeper at NavSource shows configuration as the other two, USS Gull (AM-74) and USS Kite (AM-75).) Commissioned as USS Linnet (AM-76) on 3 March 1941, conversion was completed in March 1941.

=== World War II operations ===
Assigned to the Mine Warfare School, Yorktown, Virginia, Linnet engaged in experiments and training in the intricacies of mine operations. Upon completion of training in the spring 1942, the minesweeper sailed to join Fleet operations in the South Atlantic.

Based at Recife, Brazil, Linnet played an important role in harbor clearing operations to permit the free movement of ships from that port. She regained in Brazilian waters until 22 February 1944, when she sailed for Norfolk, Virginia, arriving there 17 March. Linnet was reclassified IX-168 on 20 April for possible use as a small cargo ship.

=== End-of-War deactivation ===
Plans were changed, however, and she was decommissioned on 18 December 1944 at Boston, Massachusetts. The War Shipping Administration (WSA) was advertising the vessel for sale by 9 July 1945 as Georgetown located at Quincy, Massachusetts with the vessel returned by the Navy to WSA on 31 July 1945. The reconverted vessel was renamed Cambridge. The vessel was out of documentation in 1977.
