= Capitán Merino Jarpa-class destroyer =

Chilean destroyer class

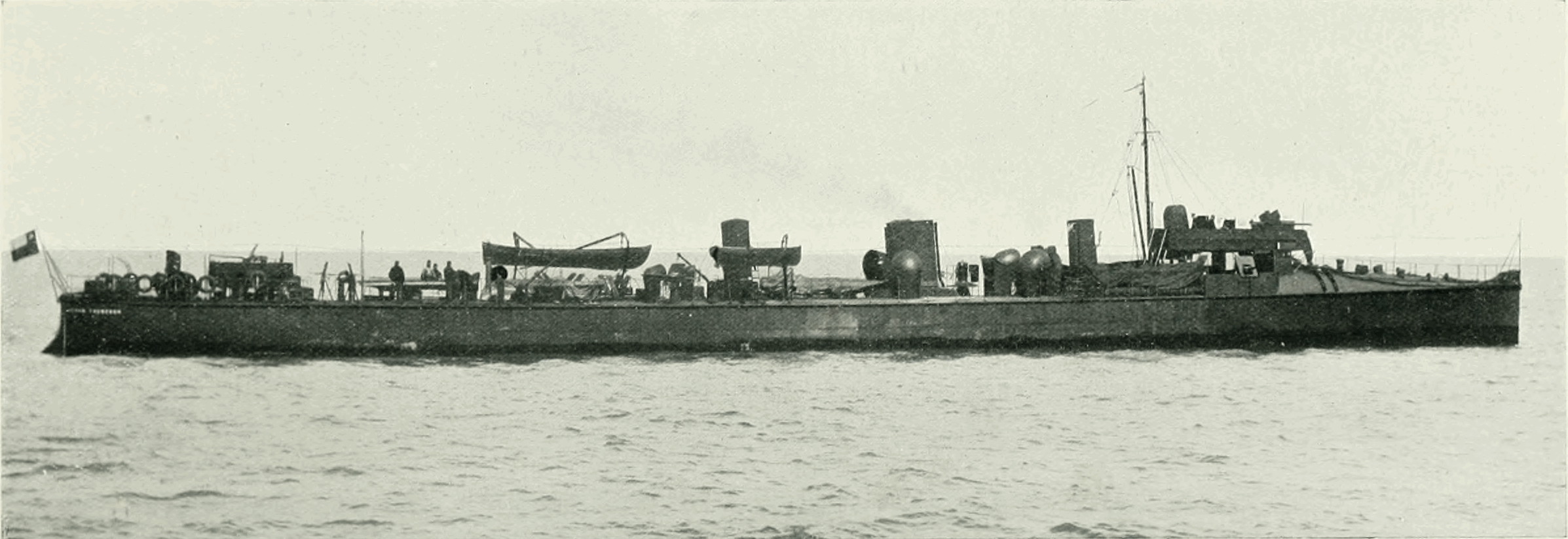
- Abeam view of Capitán Thomson in calm waters

Class overview
- Name: Capitán Merino Jarpa-class
- Builders: Cammell Laird, United Kingdom
- Operators: Chilean Navy
- Preceded by: Capitán Orella class
- Built: 1901
- In service: ?–1924
- Completed: 3
- Scrapped: 3

General characteristics
- Type: Torpedo boat destroyer
- Displacement: 321 long tons (326 t)
- Length: 215 ft 0 in (65.53 m)
- Beam: 21 ft 3 in (6.48 m)
- Draft: 5 ft 11 in (1.80 m)
- Installed power: 6,250 ihp (4,660 kW)
- Propulsion: triple-expansion steam engines; Normand boilers; 2 propellers
- Speed: 30 knots (56 km/h; 35 mph)
- Complement: 65
- Armament: 1 × 3 in (76 mm) quick-firing gun; 5 × 6-pounder guns; 2 × 18 in (457 mm) torpedo tubes

The Capitán Merino Jarpa class was a series of three torpedo boat destroyers constructed in the United Kingdom and operated by the Chilean Navy. All of the ships were built in 1901 and decommissioned in 1924. The trio was a development on the earlier Capitán Orella class, themselves based on British designs.

== Development and design ==
The destroyers were built by Cammell Laird in the United Kingdom based on the shipyard's 27-knot (50 km/h; 31 mph) design used by the Royal Navy. Unlike the British destroyers, the exported design featured four-cylinder engines and were sold to Russia and Chile. The Chilean Navy ordered four which were built in 1896 and known as the Capitán Orella class. Several years later, the design was revised with the bow torpedo tube removed and slightly enlarged to produce the three Capitán Merino Jarpa-class torpedo boat destroyers. Three were built in 1901 and named Capitán Merino Jarpa, Capitán O'Brien, and Capitán Thomson.

The four destroyers had a length between perpendiculars of 215 feet 0 inches (65.53 m) with a beam of 21 feet 3 inches (6.48 m) draught of 5 feet 11 inches (1.80 m), and a steel hull. They displaced 321 long tons (326 t) and carried a complement of 65. Propulsion was provided by two propellers powered by triple-expansion steam engines supplied by Normand boilers, which produced 6,250 indicated horsepower (4,660 kW) and gave the ships a design speed of 30 knots (56 km/h; 35 mph). During sea trials, the vessels attained speeds of between 29.29 and 30.16 knots (54.25 and 55.86 km/h; 33.71 and 34.71 mph). They carried approximately 90 long tons (91 t) of coal. Armament consisted of one bow-mounted 3 in (76 mm) quick-firing gun, five 6-pounder guns, and two 18 in (457 mm) torpedo tubes on trainable mountings.

The ships, alongside others of the type built by Cammell Laird, were criticized for having a wide turning circle and squatting at high speeds. They were decommissioned in 1924, along with the rest of the Chilean torpedo boat destroyers.

== Ships in class ==
Data
Name	Builder	Built	Fate
Capitán Merino Jarpa	Cammell Laird	1901	Stricken 1924
Capitán O'Brien	Cammell Laird	1901	Stricken 1924
Capitán Thomson	Cammell Laird	1901	Stricken 1924
