= USS Nashville (CL-43) =

Brooklyn-class light cruiser

Coordinates: 35°50′N 153°40′E

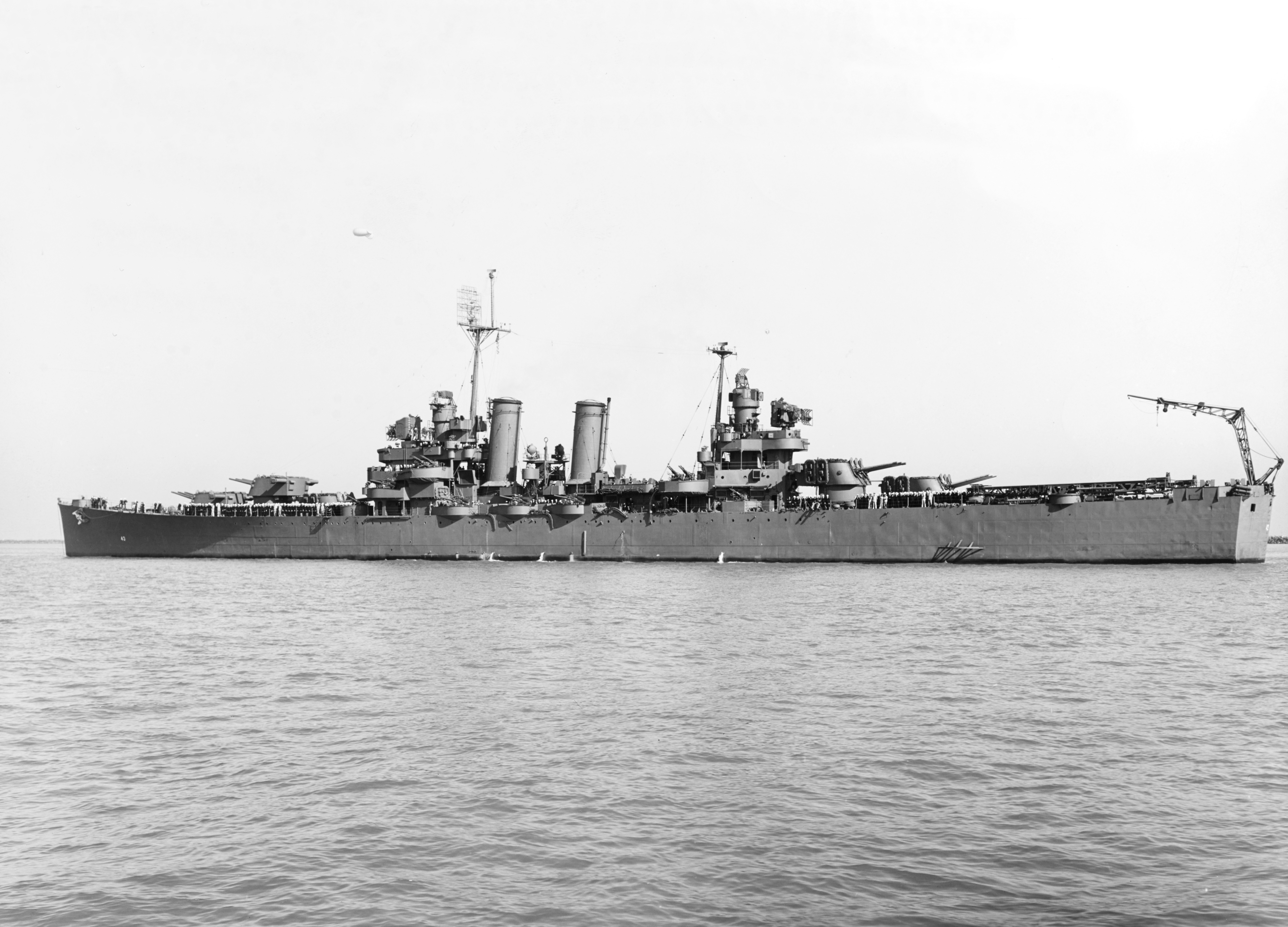
- USS Nashville (August 1943)

History

United States
- Name: Nashville
- Namesake: City of Nashville, Tennessee
- Ordered: 16 June 1933
- Awarded: 3 August 1933
- Builder: New York Shipbuilding Corporation, Camden, New Jersey
- Cost: $11,677,000 (contract price)
- Laid down: 24 January 1935
- Launched: 2 October 1937
- Sponsored by: Misses Ann and Mildred Stahlman
- Commissioned: 6 June 1938
- Decommissioned: 24 June 1946
- Stricken: 9 January 1951
- Identification: Hull symbol:CL-43; Code letters:NABG
- Honors and awards: 10 × battle stars
- Fate: Sold to the Chilean Navy 9 January 1951.

History

Chile
- Name: Capitan Prat (1951–1982); Chacabuco (1982–1984)
- Namesake: Arturo Prat; Battle of Chacabuco
- Acquired: 9 January 1951
- Decommissioned: 10 May 1982
- Fate: Scrapped 1985 in Taiwan

General characteristics (as built)
- Class & type: Brooklyn-class cruiser
- Displacement: 10,000 long tons (10,160 t) (estimated as design); 9,767 long tons (9,924 t) (standard); 12,207 long tons (12,403 t) (max)
- Length: 600 ft (180 m) oa; 608 ft 4 in (185.42 m) lwl
- Beam: 61 ft 7 in (18.77 m)
- Draft: 19 ft 9 in (6.02 m) (mean); 24 ft (7.3 m) (max)
- Installed power: 8 × Steam boilers; 100,000 shp (75,000 kW)
- Propulsion: 4 × geared turbines; 4 × screws
- Speed: 32.5 kn (37.4 mph; 60.2 km/h)
- Complement: 868 officers and enlisted
- Armament: 15 × 6 in (150 mm)/47 caliber guns (5x3); 8 × 5 in (130 mm)/25 caliber anti-aircraft guns (8×1); 8 × caliber 0.50 in (13 mm) machine guns
- Armor: Belt: 3 1/4–5 in (83–127 mm); Deck: 2 in (51 mm); Barbettes: 6 in (150 mm); Turrets: 1 1/4–6 in (32–152 mm); Conning tower: 2 1/4–5 in (57–127 mm)
- Aircraft carried: 4 × SOC Seagull floatplanes
- Aviation facilities: 2 × stern catapults

General characteristics (1945)
- Armament: 15 × 6 in (150 mm)/47 caliber guns (5x3); 8 × 5 in (130 mm)/25 caliber anti-aircraft guns (8×1); 4 × quad 40 mm (1.6 in) Bofors anti-aircraft guns; 2 × twin 40 mm (1.6 in) Bofors anti-aircraft guns; 18 × single 20 mm (0.79 in) Oerlikon cannons

USS Nashville (CL-43) was a Brooklyn-class cruiser. She was laid down on 24 January 1935 by New York Shipbuilding Corporation, Camden, New Jersey. She was launched on 2 October 1937, sponsored by Misses Ann and Mildred Stahlman and commissioned on 6 June 1938.

== Service history ==
Nashville departed Philadelphia on 19 July 1938 for shakedown in the Caribbean. In early August, she sailed for Northern Europe on a good will visit, arriving at Cherbourg, France, on 24 August. Getting underway on 21 September from Portland, England, with $25,000,000 in British gold bullion aboard, Nashville arrived at Brooklyn Navy Yard on 30 September, off-loaded the gold, and returned to Philadelphia on 5 October.

In the spring of 1939, Nashville carried American representatives to the Pan American Defense Conference in Rio de Janeiro, Brazil, returning them to Annapolis, Maryland, on 20 June 1939. On 23 June, she steamed westwards from Norfolk, Virginia, for the Pacific via the Panama Canal, arriving at San Pedro, California, on 16 July for two years of operations. In February 1941, she and three other cruisers carried US Marines to Wake Island. On 20 May, she departed Pearl Harbor for the east coast, arriving Boston on 19 June to escort a convoy carrying Marines to Iceland.

=== World War II ===
From August–December 1941, Nashville was based at Bermuda for the Neutrality Patrol in the Central Atlantic. With the bombing of Pearl Harbor, Nashville steamed to Casco Bay, Maine, where she joined with a troop and cargo convoy to escort them to Iceland. She continued escort duty to Bermuda and Iceland until February 1942.

==== Doolittle Raid ====
On 4 March 1942, she rendezvoused with Hornet off the Virginia Capes, and then escorted the aircraft carrier to the West Coast via the Panama Canal, arriving on 20 March at San Diego. Hornet and Nashville steamed from San Francisco on 2 April, with the carrier laden with 16 Army B-25 Mitchell medium bombers on her flight deck, bombers under the command of Lieutenant Colonel Jimmy Doolittle, USAAF, for the Doolittle Raid on Japan. On 13 April, they rendezvoused with other US Navy warships, under Vice Admiral William F. Halsey Jr., north of Midway Atoll, and then they set course for Japan. When about 1,000 mi (1,600 km) away from Japan on 17 April, the destroyers of the task force were detached due to lack of fuel, and then Nashville, the other escorting cruisers, and Hornet and Enterprise made a high-speed dash to the air raid launching point 500 mi (800 km) from Japan. The next day, the task force was sighted by a Japanese picket boat, which reported the presence of the carrier task force before being sunk by scout planes from Enterprise. A second picket boat was then sunk by gunfire from Nashville, but the advantage of surprise was lost. The B–25s were launched 150 mi (240 km) short of the intended launching point in heavy seas. Immediately after the launch, the strike force reversed course and steamed eastwards for Honolulu. The "Shangri-La" task force returned to Pearl Harbor on 25 April.

==== Flagship ====
Nashville left Hawaii on 14 May 1942 to become the flagship of Task Force 8 (TF 8) defending Alaska and the Aleutians, and arrived at Dutch Harbor, Alaska, on 26 May. She steamed for Kodiak, Alaska two days later to join with other units of the task force, including USS St Louis and her sister USS Honolulu as well as two heavy cruisers and 6 destroyers. On 3–4 June, Japanese carrier planes struck Dutch Harbor. Nashville and her accompanying warships were unable to make contact with the enemy due to heavy fog. Admiral Isoroku Yamamoto withdrew his diversionary force from the Aleutians after his defeat at the Battle of Midway. As the Japanese departed, they left occupying forces behind on Attu and Kiska Islands in the Aleutians. From June–November, Nashville patrolled the North Pacific Ocean, and participated in the attack on Kiska on 7 August, in which heavy damage was inflicted on Japanese shore installations.

Nashville arrived at Pearl Harbor on 22 November and proceeded south to the Fiji Islands on 24 December. At Espiritu Santo, New Hebrides, she became flagship of TF 67. After escorting troopships to Guadalcanal, Nashville, Helena, and St. Louis inflicted heavy damage on the Japanese air base at Munda on the night of 4 January 1943. Subsequent attacks were made on Kolombangara and New Georgia in the next several months. While shelling Vila airfield on Kolombangara on the night of 12 May, she suffered a powder charge explosion in one of her forward turrets, killing 18 and injuring 17.

Leaving Espiritu Santo on 22 May, Nashville arrived at Mare Island Naval Shipyard for repairs and modernization. Departing from San Francisco on 6 August, she arrived at Pearl Harbor on 12 August to join carrier task forces for strikes on Marcus Island and Wake Island during the next two months.

Nashville returned to Espiritu Santo on 25 October and for the next seven months, she shelled targets on New Guinea and the Admiralty Islands. Against the Japanese, Nashville provided fire support for the landings on Bougainville Island and Cape Gloucester, New Britain. After bombarding Wake Island on 21–22 April 1944, Nashville provided fire support and carried General of the Army Douglas MacArthur to the amphibious operations at Hollandia (present-day Jayapura), Tanahmerah Bay, and Aitape, on 22–23 April. On 27 May, the light cruiser was a member of the assault force shelling Biak, Schouten Islands, where on 4 June, she sustained moderate damage from a near miss while repelling a Japanese air attack.

After repairs at Espiritu Santo, New Hebrides, Nashville twice more carried General MacArthur and his staff to the invasion of Morotai, Dutch East Indies in mid-September. She carried General MacArthur on his return to the Philippines, for which she sailed from Manus on 16 October. She provided fire support for the Leyte Island landings on 20 October, and she remained on station at the mouth of Leyte Gulf until 25 October, guarding the troops on the beachhead and the nearby transports. Returning to Manus Island for brief repairs, Nashville left the Admiralties on 28 November as the flagship for the Commander, Visayan Attack Force, en route to the invasion of Mindoro.

==== Kamikaze attack ====
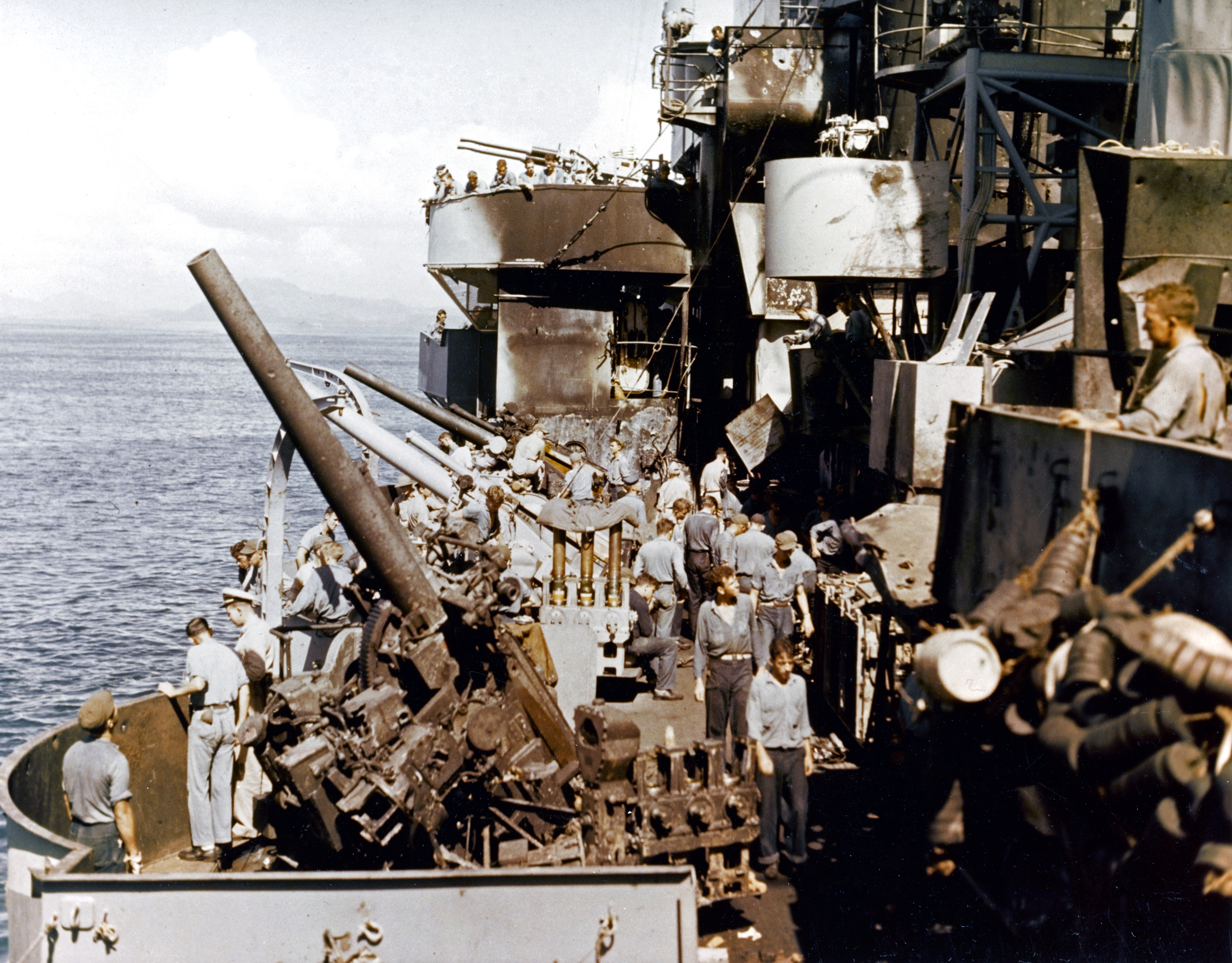
Crew clean up Nashville's port 5-inch gun battery after the kamikaze hit

On 13 December, she was struck by a kamikaze off Negros Island. The aircraft crashed into her port 5 in/127mm gun mount, with both bombs exploding about 10 ft (3 m) off her deck. Gasoline fires and exploding ammunition made her midships area an inferno, but although 133 sailors were killed and 190 wounded, her remaining 5 in (127 mm) guns continued to provide anti-aircraft fire.

The Attack Group Commander, Rear Admiral Arthur Dewey Struble, shifted his flag to Dashiell, and Nashville steamed via San Pedro Bay in the Philippines and Pearl Harbor, Oahu, to the Puget Sound Naval Shipyard, arriving on 12 January 1945, for heavy repairs. Underway on 12 March, Nashville departed westward from San Diego, California, on 15 April after training exercises.

Arriving at U.S. Naval Base Subic Bay, on 16 May, Nashville became the flagship of TF 74. The closing months of the war were spent providing fire support for the landings at Brunei Bay, Borneo, and protecting aircraft carriers in the Makassar Straits, Dutch East Indies. On 29 July, Nashville made a brief sortie from Subic to intercept a Japanese convoy reported off Indochina, but the sortie was soon canceled, ending her final wartime operation.

=== Post-war ===
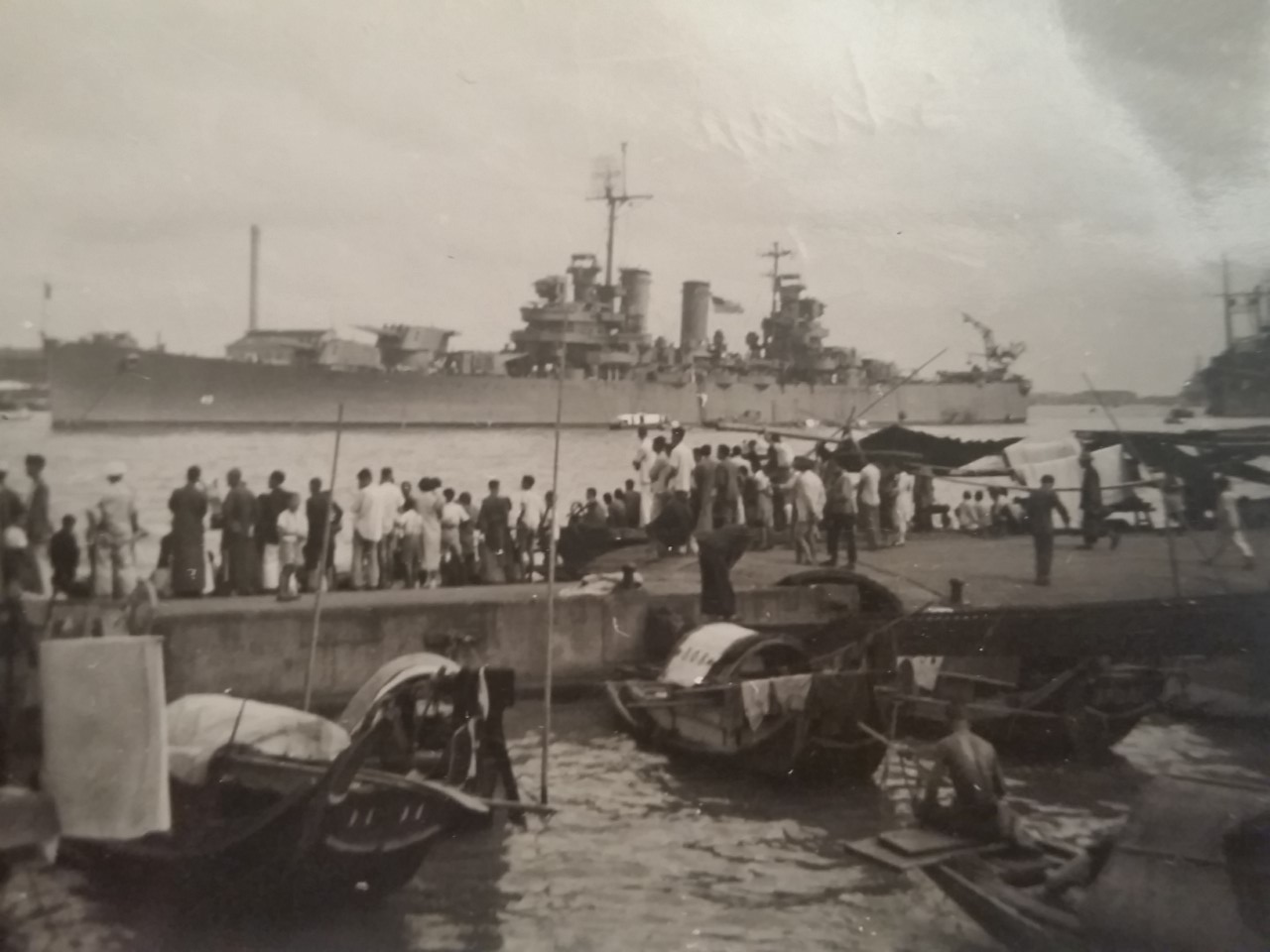
USS Nashville CL-46, Oct. 1945, on Yangtze River Patrol, Whang-poo River, Shanghai, China, view from Whang-poo Pier

Nashville, with Commander TF 73 (CTF 73) embarked, entered Shanghai harbor on 19 September 1945, to resume Yangtze River Patrol. CTF 73 hauled down his flag on 17 November, and Nashville sailed for the US West Coast with 450 returning soldiers, as part of Operation Magic Carpet. Picking up 90 more soldiers in Hawaii, she reached San Pedro, California, on 3 December, and then immediately steamed west to Eniwetok and Kwajalein to pick up more returning troops and Marines. Nearing the US West Coast on 3 January 1946, Nashville came to the aid of St. Mary's, laboring in heavy seas with engine breakdowns and 1,800 men aboard. The cruiser took St. Mary's in tow, pulling her to safety to the tugs at the San Francisco Lightship on 6 January 1946.

=== Chilean Navy ===
Nashville departed eastward from San Francisco on 21 January 1946, and she arrived at the Philadelphia Naval Shipyard for a pre-inactivation overhaul. Decommissioned on 24 June, she remained in reserve until 1950. After an overhaul at the Philadelphia Naval Yard, she was sold to Chile on 9 January 1951, and she served in the Chilean Navy as the Chilean cruiser Capitán Prat (CL-03) until the arrival of the Chilean destroyer Capitán Prat (1967) in 1982. Then, the old Prat was renamed Chacabuco and served until 1985.

She saw service during the 1973 Chilean coup d'etat, where she secured Federico Santa María Technical University alongside the destroyer Aldea.
