= Chilean destroyer Teniente Serrano =

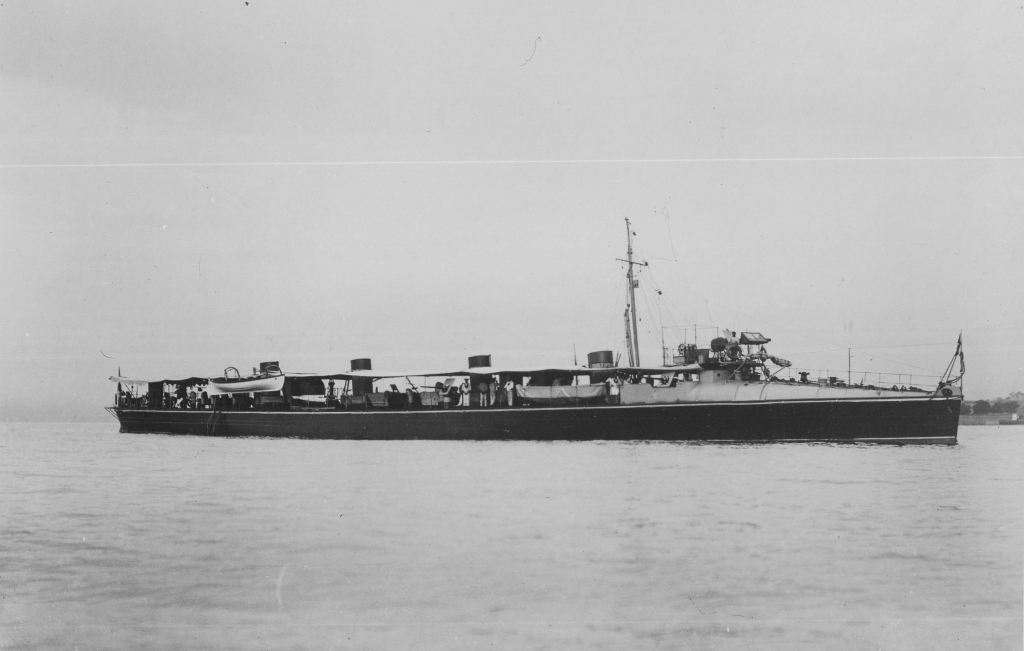

History

Chile
- Name: Teniente Serrano
- Ordered: 1895
- Builder: Laird Brothers, Birkenhead, England
- Cost: £55,400
- Launched: 16 May 1896
- Commissioned: 1896

General characteristics
- Class & type: Capitán Orella class Torpedo boat destroyer
- Displacement: 311 t
- Length: 64.9 m (212 ft 11 in) (pp)
- Beam: 6.55 m (21 ft 6 in)
- Draught: 1.79 m (5 ft 10 in)
- Propulsion: 6,250 hp (4,660 kW), VTE, 4 Normand boilers
- Speed: 30 knots (56 km/h; 35 mph)
- Complement: 65
- Armament: 1 × 1 - 76 mm (3.0 in)/40 Armstrong gun; 5 × 1 - 57 mm (2.2 in)/40 Hotchkiss gun; 2 × 1 - 450 mm (18 in) torpedo tubes

Teniente Serrano was a torpedo boat destroyer commissioned by the Chilean Navy in 1896. It was built by Laird Brothers along with three other destroyers: Capitán Orella, Capitán Muñoz Gamero and Guardiamarina Riquelme (later Lientur).

They were steel-hulled torpedo boat destroyers with a turtleback forecastle and four funnels. These ships were, when built, the most advanced ships of their type in Latin America, closely related to contemporary British destroyers. On trials the vessels made 30.1–30.42 knots (55.75–56.34 km/h; 34.64–35.01 mph) on 6,313–6,398 horsepower (4,708–4,771 kW).

Teniente Serrano was launched at Laird's Birkenhead shipyard on 16 May 1896.

== See also ==
- Serrano-class destroyer which served with Chilean Navy from 1928 to 1967
- Argentine–Chilean naval arms race
- List of decommissioned ships of the Chilean Navy
