= SS Goodleigh =

A number of steamships have been named Goodleigh, including:

- SS Goodleigh (1928), a British cargo ship in service 1928–37
- SS Goodleigh (1938), a British cargo ship torpedoed and sunk in 1940
