= Chilean destroyer Aldea =

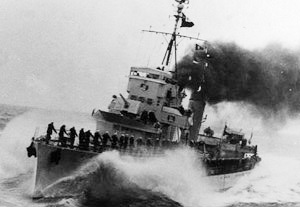
- Aldea at sea circa 1932

History

Chile
- Name: Aldea
- Ordered: 1928
- Builder: John I. Thornycroft & Company
- Laid down: 8 March 1928
- Launched: 28 November 1928
- Commissioned: 26 July 1929
- Decommissioned: 21 June 1957
- Fate: Scrapped

General characteristics
- Class & type: Serrano-class destroyer
- Displacement: 1,090 long tons (1,107 t) standard; 1,430 long tons (1,453 t) full load
- Length: 91.44 m (300 ft)
- Beam: 8.84 m (29 ft)
- Draught: 3.86 m (12 ft 8 in)
- Propulsion: 3 × boilers; Parsons-type geared steam turbines; 2 shafts; 28,000 hp (20,880 kW)
- Speed: 35 knots (65 km/h; 40 mph)
- Complement: 130
- Armament: 3 × single 4.7 in (120 mm)/45 caliber guns; 1 × 3 in (76 mm)/40 DP gun; 6 × 21 in (533 mm) torpedo tubes; Equipped with mine sweeping capability

The third Aldea was a Serrano-class destroyer of the Chilean Navy in service from 1928 to 1967, but temporarily reactivated in 1973 to participate in the coup d'etat, where she and Captain Prat were used to secure Federico Santa María Technical University. She was laid down in 1928 by Thornycroft, at Woolston, Hampshire, England. She was launched by Mrs. Berta Castro de Merino (mother of future admiral José Toribio Merino) in November 1928, and commissioned in July 1929.

Aldea was one of six vessels in its class to serve Chile. The class was ordered from the United Kingdom and delivered in 1928 and 1929. Like its sister ships Riquelme and Videla, it was also equipped for duties as a minesweeper. The vessels had a displacement of 1,430 long tons (1,453 t) at full load and were armed with three 4.7 in (120 mm)/45 and one 3 in (76 mm)/40 DP gun, as well as six 21-inch (533 mm) torpedo tubes. The ships could make 35 knots (65 km/h; 40 mph), but their light build proved unsuitable for the harsh southern waters off Chile's coast.
