= Chilean destroyer Hyatt =

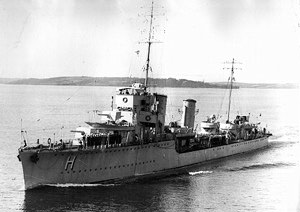
- CNS Hyatt

History

Chile
- Name: Hyatt
- Namesake: Edward Hyatt
- Ordered: 1927
- Laid down: 23 September 1927
- Launched: 21 July 1928
- Commissioned: 15 April 1929
- Decommissioned: 31 August 1962
- Fate: Sold for scrap

General characteristics
- Class & type: Serrano-class destroyer
- Displacement: 1,090 long tons (1,107 t) standard; 1,430 long tons (1,453 t) full load
- Length: 91.44 m (300 ft) oa; 87.86 m (288 ft 3 in) pp
- Beam: 8.84 m (29 ft)
- Draught: 3.86 m (12 ft 8 in)
- Propulsion: 3 × Thornycroft boilers; Parsons-type geared steam turbines; 2 shafts; 28,000 shp (20,880 kW)
- Speed: 35 kn (65 km/h; 40 mph)
- Complement: 130
- Armament: 3 single × 4.7 in (120 mm)/45 caliber guns; 1 × 3 in (76 mm)/40 AA gun; 6 × 21 in (533 mm) torpedo tubes; Equipped with mine laying capability

Hyatt was a Serrano-class destroyer of the Chilean Navy from 1928 to 1967. She was laid down in 1927 by Thornycroft, at Woolston, Hampshire, England. She was launched by Mrs Margarita L. de Cubillos in November 1928, and commissioned in April 1929. The ship was named after Edward Hyatt, who died while serving aboard a Chilean warship at the Battle of Iquique, and is the first Chilean warship of the name.

Hyatt was one of six vessels in its class to serve Chile. The class was ordered from the United Kingdom and delivered in 1928 and 1929. Like its sister ships Serrano and Orella it was also equipped with mine laying capability. The vessels had a displacement of 1450 tonnes and were armed with three 4.7 in (120 mm)/45 and one 3 in (76 mm)/40 DP gun as well as six 21-inch torpedo tubes. The ships could make 35 knots (65 km/h; 40 mph), but their light build proved unsuitable for the harsh southern waters off Chile's coast.
