= Houlder Line =

Former British shipping company

House flag used by Houlder Line

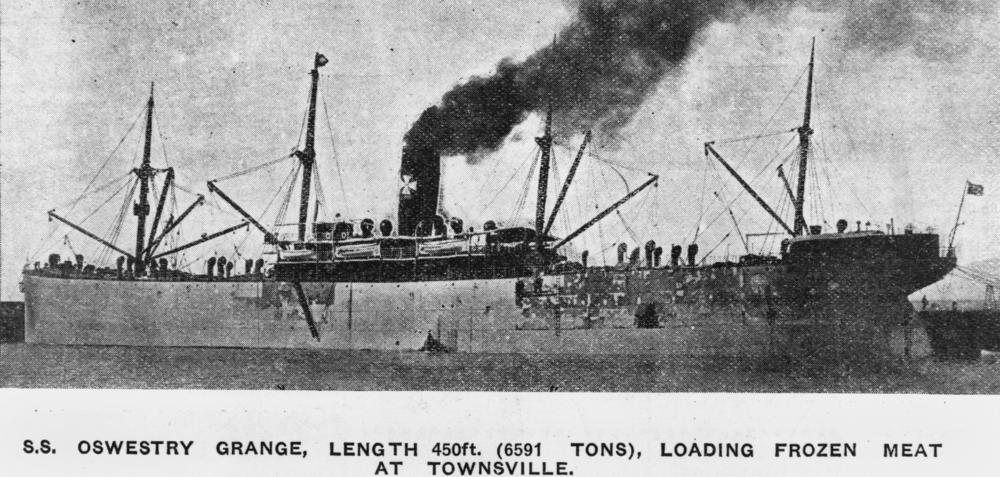
The first of four Houlder ships to be called Oswestry Grange. This one was a refrigerated cargo ship built in 1902 and sold in 1912

Houlder Line was a number of related British shipping companies originally established by the Houlder brothers.

== History ==
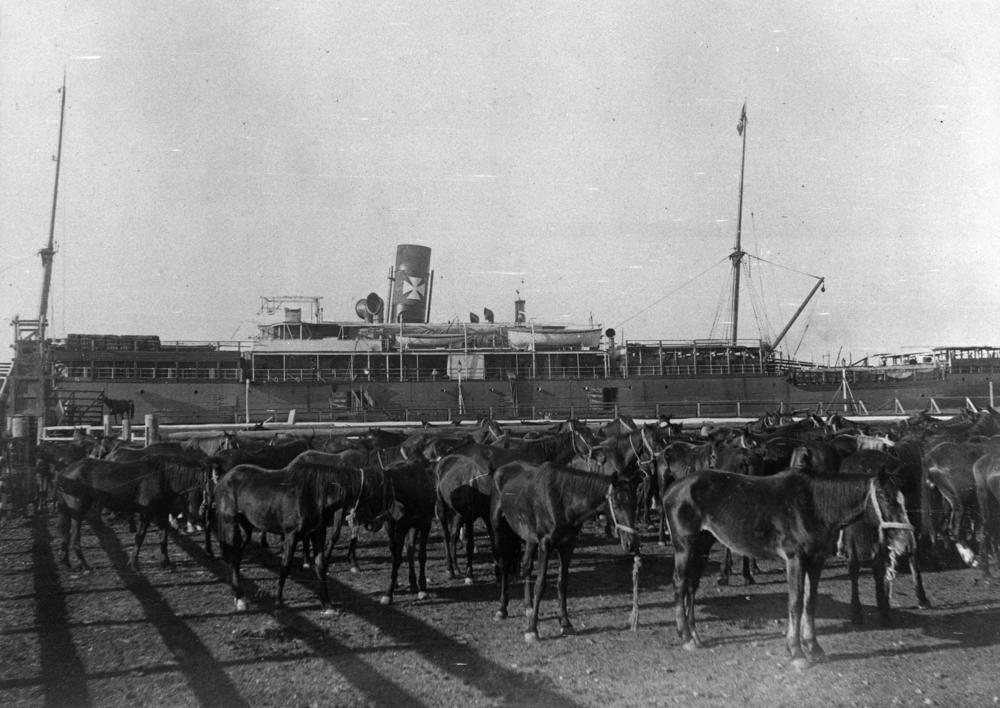
Drayton Grange in Brisbane. She was built for Houlder Brothers in 1901 and sold in 1912.

Houlder Brothers & Co was formed in London 1856 and operated in the market for chartered tonnage. In 1861 the company acquired the Golden Horn, which they used on the North Atlantic routes to the United States. The company later expanded to service routes to New Zealand, Australia and the Pacific Islands. From 1875 to 1880 the company worked with John T. Arundel & Co. in a guano mining business on Flint Island in the Pacific Ocean. In 1881 the company entered the passenger and cargo trade to the River Plate.

In 1911 Furness, Withy & Co Ltd bought a 50 per cent share in Houlder Brothers. By that date Houlder Brothers controlled a fleet of 19 ships via three subsidiaries: nine ships in Houlder Line Ltd, nine in the Empire Transport Company and one in the Oswestry Grange Steamchip Company. In 1914 Houlder Brothers Ltd and Furness, Withy established a joint venture, the Furness-Houlder Argentine Line.

== Ship names ==
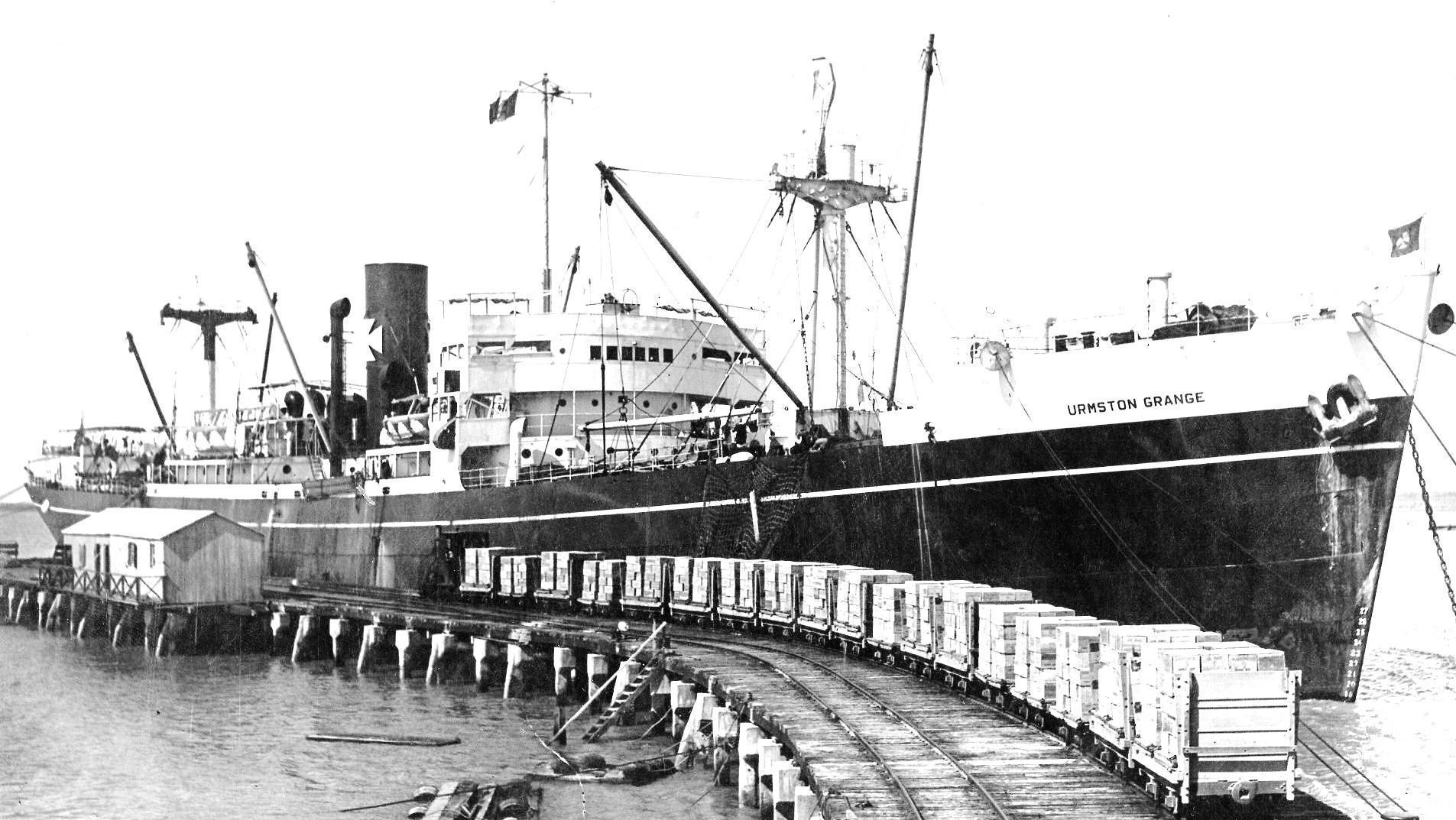
The second of two Houlder ships to be called Urmston Grange. She was built in 1942 as the Empire ship Empire Pibroch. Houlder Brothers bought and renamed her in 1946 and sold her in 1959.

From the 1890s onwards Houlder ships gave many of its ships names ending in Grange. The group re-used some of these names three or more times on successive ships: Beacon Grange, Elstree Grange, Langton Grange, Oswestry Grange, Ovingdean Grange and Royston Grange. The first word in the ships name was usually an English village or town having an initial making up part of the company name: e.g. Hornby Grange, Oswestry Grange, Upwey Grange, Langton Grange, Dunster Grange, Elstree Grange. Until the 1972 disaster Royston was traditionally used to supply the 'R' but after this Ripon was used.

== Losses ==
Houlder Line lost 12 ships in the First World War and 11 in the Second World War. Furness-Houlder Argentine Lines lost three ships in the Second World War: Canonesa, Duquesa and El Argentino. In 1917 British Transport, from Houlder's Empire Transport Company subsidiary, became the first merchant ship to sink a u-boat.

In 1972 STV Royston Grange collided with a tanker in the Río de la Plata. Both ships caught fire, killing all 74 people aboard Royston Grange and eight crew members on the tanker. Royston Grange was the sister ship of STV Hardwick Grange, which was transferred to Shaw, Savill & Albion Line in 1975.

== End of shipping operations ==
Houlder Line ceased shipping operations in 1987, when Lord Kelvin was sold to Norwegian buyers.

The company continues as the independent engineering consultancy Houlder Ltd.

== Bibliography ==
- Burrell, David (1992). Furness Withy 1891–1991. Kendal: World Ship Society. ISBN 0-905617-70-3.
