= Serrano-class destroyer =

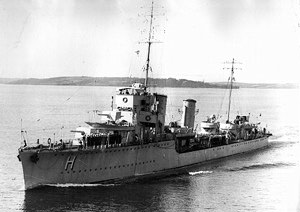
- Hyatt

Class overview
- Name: Serrano class
- Builders: John I. Thornycroft & Company
- Operators: Chilean Navy
- Preceded by: Almirante Lynch class
- Succeeded by: Almirante class
- Built: 1927–1929
- In commission: 1928–1967
- Planned: 6
- Completed: 6
- Retired: 6

General characteristics
- Type: Destroyer
- Displacement: 1,090 long tons (1,107 t) standard; 1,430 long tons (1,453 t) full load
- Length: 91.44 m (300 ft 0 in)
- Beam: 8.84 m (29 ft 0 in)
- Draught: 3.86 m (12 ft 8 in)
- Propulsion: 3 × boilers; Parsons-type geared steam turbines; 2 shafts; 28,000 shp (20,880 kW)
- Speed: 35 knots (65 km/h; 40 mph)
- Complement: 130
- Armament: 3 × single 4.7 in (120 mm)/45 caliber guns; 1 × 3 in (76 mm)/40 AA gun; 2 × triple 21 in (533 mm) torpedo tubes; Mine warfare equipment: Serrano, Orella, and Hyatt equipped with mine laying capability, while Aldea, Videla, and Riquelme were equipped as minesweepers

The Serrano class was a series of six destroyers, built to a British design, which served with the Chilean Navy from 1928 to 1967. In 1927 Chile ordered the Serrano class from John I. Thornycroft & Company in the United Kingdom at the cost of £230,000 for each ship to enhance the Chilean Navy's ability to patrol its extensive coastline. The six vessels were completed by 1929. Serrano, Orella and Hyatt were equipped for minelaying, and Aldea, Riquelme and Videla for minesweeping.

Because of weak hull construction the ships had been assessed unsuitable for service along the southern Chilean coast, where it was necessary to use older ships of Almirante Lynch class instead. The destroyers remained in service until the mid-1960s.

== Design and description ==
Due to its longstanding relationship with the United Kingdom and the quality of British destroyer designs at the time, Chile opted for the John I. Thornycroft & Company option in an international competition to build the Chilean Navy new destroyers. The design followed a standard British layout, but was reduced in size and power. The destroyers had a standard displacement of 1,090 long tons (1,107 t) and were 1,430 long tons (1,453 t) at full load. They were 91.44 m (300 ft 0 in) long overall and 87.86 m (288 ft 3 in) between perpendiculars with a beam of 8.84 m (29 ft 0 in) and a mean draught of 3.86 m (12 ft 8 in).

The destroyers were propelled by two shafts turned by Parsons-type geared turbines rated at 28,000 shp (20,880 kW). These in turn were powered by steam from three Thornycroft boilers. The vessels had a maximum speed of 35 knots (65 km/h; 40 mph) and carried 320 long tons (325 t) of fuel oil. They had a complement of 130 officers and ratings. During sea trials, all six destroyers exceeded their designed speed by 1–1 1/2 knots (1.9–2.8 km/h; 1.2–1.7 mph).

The Serrano class was armed with three single 4.7-inch (120 mm)/45 calibre guns with half-height gun shields. (Note: The 45 calibre denotes the length of the gun. This means that the length of the gun barrel is 45 times the bore diameter.) The lack of a fourth gun on the quarterdeck allowed the destroyers to be fitted with minelaying or minesweeping gear. Serrano, Orella and Hyatt were fitted for minelaying, while Riquelme, Aldea and Videla were fitted for minesweeping. For secondary armament for anti-aircraft (AA) defence, the Serrano class was fitted with a single 3-inch (76 mm)/40 AA gun and three machine guns. The destroyers also had two triple-mounted torpedo tubes for 21-inch (533 mm) torpedoes. They were fitted with two depth charge throwers for anti-submarine warfare (ASW).

=== Refit ===
The Serrano class underwent very little modification during their service lives. In the first 25 years of service, the only changes was the removal of the mainmast and the addition of single-mounted 20 mm (0.8 in) Oerlikon cannon for AA defence. In the mid-1950s, four of the class were converted to destroyer escorts and were given radar on a tripod mast and the AA defence was increased to four 20 mm cannon.

== Ships ==
Consturciton data
| Ship | Builder | Laid down | Launched | Commissioned | Decommissioned | Fate |
|---|---|---|---|---|---|---|
| Serrano | John I. Thornycroft & Company, Southampton | 21 June 1927 | 25 January 1928 | 18 December 1928 | 18 December 1962 | Stricken 29 September 1966 |
| Orella | John I. Thornycroft & Company, Southampton | 21 June 1927 | 8 March 1928 | 18 December 1928 | 18 December 1962 | Stricken 29 September 1966 |
| Hyatt | John I. Thornycroft & Company, Southampton | 23 September 1927 | 21 July 1928 | 15 April 1929 | 31 August 1962 | Stricken 30 January 1963 |
| Aldea | John I. Thornycroft & Company, Southampton | 8 March 1928 | 24 November 1928 | 26 July 1929 | 21 June 1957 | Stricken 12 February 1958 |
| Videla | John I. Thornycroft & Company, Southampton | 25 January 1928 | 16 October 1928 | 26 July 1929 | 21 June 1957 | Stricken 12 February 1958 |
| Riquelme | John I. Thornycroft & Company, Southampton | 18 July 1927 | 21 May 1928 | 15 April 1929 | 31 August 1962 | Stricken 30 January 1963 |

== Service history ==
Serrano and Orella entered service with the Chilean Navy in 1928, followed by the rest of the class in 1929. The light construction of the vessels made them inadequate for the rough waters off the southern coast of Chile, and battleship deployments to that region required that the Serrano class be left behind and older destroyers provide escort. As Chile remained neutral during World War II, the service lives of the Serrano class remained relatively uneventful. Following the war, four of the class, Serrano, Hyatt, Orella and Riquelme, were converted to destroyer escorts in the mid-1950s. The two unmodified ships, Aldea and Videla were decommissioned in 1957 and the four destroyer escorts remained in service until 1962.

== See also ==
- Chilean destroyer Serrano (1896)
