= MV El Argentino =

Sunken cargo ship

Coordinates: 39°50′N 13°36′W

History

United Kingdom
- Name: El Argentino
- Namesake: Spanish for "The Argentinian"
- Owner: 1928: Furness, Houlder Arg Lines; 1934: Furness, Withy & Co
- Operator: Furness, Houlder Argentine Lines
- Port of registry: London
- Builder: Fairfield Sb & Eng Co, Govan
- Yard number: 629
- Launched: 11 January 1928
- Completed: April 1928
- Identification: UK official number 160405; code letters LBNS (until 1933); call sign GNQD (1934 onward)
- Fate: Sunk by aerial bombing, 26 July 1943

General characteristics
- Type: refrigerated cargo ship
- Tonnage: 9,501 GRT, 6,023 NRT
- Length: 431.3 ft (131.5 m)
- Beam: 64.5 ft (19.7 m)
- Draught: 29 ft 9 in (9.07 m)
- Depth: 35.4 ft (10.8 m)
- Decks: 3
- Installed power: 1,708 NHP, 6,400 bhp
- Propulsion: 2 × two-stroke diesel engines; 2 × screws
- Speed: 15 knots (28 km/h)
- Capacity: 557,500 cubic feet (15,787 m^{3}) refrigerated cargo
- Crew: 98 in WW2, including DEMS gunners
- Sensors & processing systems: wireless direction finding
- Armament: as DEMS: 1 × 4-inch or 4.7-inch gun; 1 × 12-pounder gun; 10 × machine guns
- Notes: sister ships: Upwey Grange, Dunster Grange

MV El Argentino was a refrigerated cargo motor ship that was built in Scotland in 1920 and sunk by a German aircraft in the Atlantic Ocean in 1943.

Furness, Houlder Argentine Lines operated her throughout her career. This was a joint venture between Furness, Withy and Houlder Line to carry chilled and frozen meat and other produce from South America to the United Kingdom.

This was the company's second ship to be called El Argentino. The first was a steamship that was launched in 1907 and sunk by a German mine in 1916.

== Building and technical details ==
In 1925 the Fairfield Shipbuilding and Engineering Company launched the refrigerated cargo ship Upwey Grange at its Govan shipyard for Houlder Line. Fairfield went on to build two sister ships: Dunster Grange in 1927 for Houlder Line and El Argentino in 1928 for Furness, Houlder Argentine Lines.

El Argentino was 431.3 ft (131.5 m) long, her beam was 64.5 ft (19.7 m) and her depth was 35.4 ft (10.8 m). Her tonnages were 9,501 GRT and 6,023 NRT. Her holds were refrigerated, with capacity for 557,500 cubic feet (15,787 m^{3}) of perishable cargo.

El Argentino had two screws. Each was driven by a Sulzer-type six-cylinder single-acting two-stroke diesel engine, built under licence by Fairfield. Between them the two engines were rated at 1,708 NHP or 6,400 bhp.

El Argentino's UK official number was 160405. Her code letters were LBNS until they were superseded in 1934 by the call sign GNQD. Also in 1934 her ownership was transferred to Furness, Withy, but Furness, Houlder Argentine Lines remained her managers.

== Loss ==
In the Second World War El Argentino was a defensively equipped merchant ship. By 1943 her armament comprised one 4-inch or 4.7-inch gun, one 12-pounder gun and ten machine guns.

In July 1943 El Argentino left the Firth of Clyde in ballast, bound for Montevideo and Buenos Aires. She joined Convoy OS 52 / KMS 21, which left Liverpool on 19 July which was bound for Freetown in Sierra Leone.

On 26 July a German Focke-Wulf Fw 200 Condor aircraft bombed El Argentino in the North Atlantic about 230 nautical miles (430 km) northwest of Lisbon, sinking the ship and killing four members of her crew. 94 crew members and six passengers survived.

== Bibliography ==
- Burrell, David (1992). Furness Withy 1891–1991. Kendal: World Ship Society. ISBN 0-905617-70-3.
