= SS Royston Grange (1959) =

Refrigerated cargo liner steamship

History

United Kingdom
- Name: Royston Grange
- Namesake: Royston Grange, Ballidon
- Owner: Houlder Line Ltd
- Operator: Houlder Bros & Co Ltd
- Port of registry: London
- Route: Great Britain – Río de la Plata
- Builder: Hawthorn, Leslie & Co, Hebburn
- Yard number: 736
- Launched: 23 June 1959
- Completed: December 1959
- Out of service: 11 May 1972
- Identification: UK official number 301035; IMO number: 5301502
- Fate: Destroyed by fire after collision 11 May 1972. Scrapped 1979.

General characteristics
- Type: refrigerated cargo liner
- Tonnage: 10,262 GRT, 5,726 NRT, 10,385 DWT
- Length: 489.0 ft (149.0 m)
- Beam: 65.7 ft (20.0 m)
- Depth: 29.0 ft (8.8 m)
- Installed power: 8,500 shp
- Propulsion: 2 × steam turbines, 1 × shaft
- Speed: 16 knots (30 km/h)
- Capacity: 12 passengers
- Crew: 61
- Notes: sister ship: Hardwicke Grange

SS Royston Grange was a Houlder Line refrigerated cargo liner steamship that was built in England in 1959. In 1972 she collided with the tanker Tien Chee in the Río de la Plata. The resulting fire killed all 74 people aboard Royston Grange, and eight people aboard Tien Chee. Royston Grange's burnt-out hulk was scrapped in Spain in 1979.

Royston or Roystone Grange is an 18th-century farmstead next to the site of a medieval monastic grange at Ballidon in Derbyshire, England. Houlder Line had named ships after several English granges, including Royston, since the 1890s. This ship was the company's fifth and last Royston Grange.

== Building ==
Hawthorn Leslie (Shipbuilders) Ltd. built Royston Grange in 1959, launching her on 23 June and completing her that December. She was 489.0 ft (149.0 m) long, her beam was 65.7 ft (20.0 m) and her depth was 29.0 ft (8.8 m). She had a single screw, driven by two steam turbines via reduction gearing. Between them the two turbines developed 8,500 shp and gave her a speed of 16 knots (30 km/h).

Royston Grange's holds were refrigerated to carry perishable cargo such as meat and dairy products. Her refrigeration system was electrically powered and its refrigerant was freon gas. Her refrigeration room was at the starboard side of her engine room. The gas was compressed, then cooled and injected into a large evaporation cylinder which then supercooled brine that was circulated through the evaporator. The supercooled brine was pumped at three temperature levels to the various cargo holds where the brine circulated through fan blown radiators to cool the cargo.

Royston Grange's superstructure was in two separate parts. Her bridge was amidships, above accommodation for her deck officers and 12 passengers. Accommodation for her crew and engineering officers was slightly aft, and also included her four lifeboats. The hatch to one of her holds separated the two parts of her accommodation. Such a division of the superstructure was not unique for ships of her era, e.g. Royal Mail Lines' Magdalena and "Three Graces" Amazon (1959), Aragon (1959) and Arlanza (1960). But it was very unusual for a Houlder Line ship.

Hawthorn Leslie built a sister ship and running mate, Hardwicke Grange. She was launched on 21 October 1960 and completed in March 1961. The two ships carried chilled and frozen produce from the River Plate ports of Argentina and Uruguay to London, Liverpool and ports in the Bristol Channel.

== Collision and disaster ==
In May 1972 Royston Grange loaded a cargo of chilled and frozen beef and butter in Buenos Aires. She embarked 12 passengers, including six women and a five-year-old child, and left port bound for London. At 0540 hrs on 11 May Royston Grange was in the Punta Indio Channel, 35 nautical miles (65 km) southwest of Montevideo, Uruguay, under the direction of an Argentine maritime pilot, in dense fog.

Also in the Punta Indio channel, inbound to the River Plate, was the Liberian-registered tanker Tien Chee carrying 20,000 tons of crude oil. Tien Chee was also under the direction of an Argentine pilot.

According to maritime rules, the two ships should have passed each other's port sides. But Royston Grange's bow struck Tien Chee's port side, rupturing the tanker's number seven wing tank. Tien Chee's cargo caught fire, which almost instantly spread to Royston Grange, and the butter in the latter's cargo contributed to the intensity of the fire. The collision also ruptured Royston Grange's refrigeration tanks.

Royston Grange's passengers and many of her crew would have been asleep. The effects of the fire killed all 61 of her crew, all 12 passengers and her Argentine pilot, and also eight Chinese members of Tien Chee's crew. Argentine Naval Prefecture cutters rescued from Tien Chee 32 surviving members of her crew and her Argentine pilot. The majority of the crew and half the passengers in Royston Grange were British nationals, exceptions being a Dutch boatswain and an American able seaman from the crew, an Australian, a New Zealander, two Germans and two Argentine passengers.

The collision swung Tien Chee across the channel, grounding her and blocking all traffic in or out of Buenos Aires. Uruguayan tugs with water hoses doused the fire aboard both ships.

== Aftermath ==
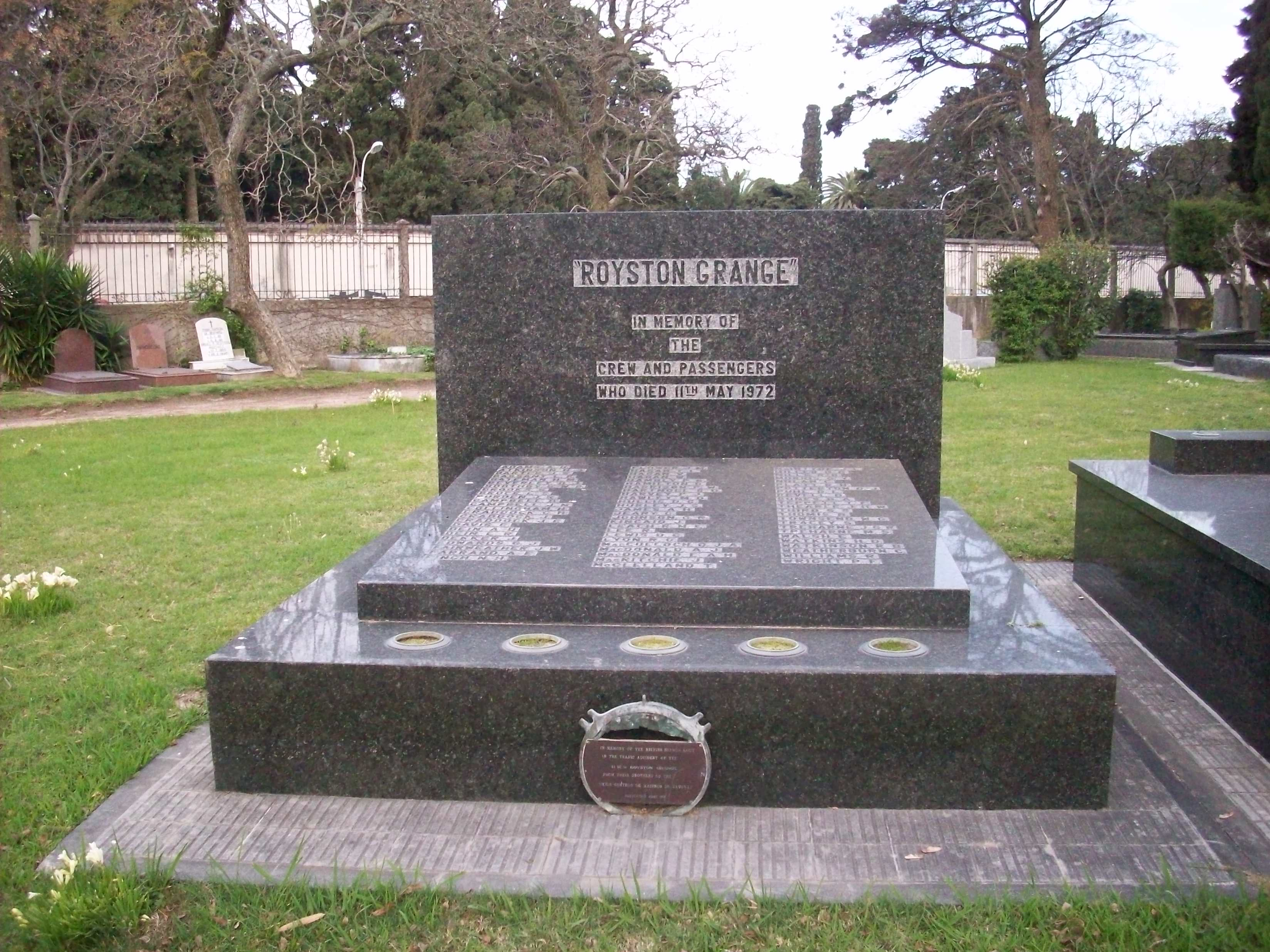
Royston Grange headstone in the British Cemetery Montevideo

Houlder Line flew 130 relatives of the victims to Uruguay for a mass funeral of the victims. On 20 May 1972 their remains, mostly little more than ashes and charred bones, were buried in six urns in two communal graves in The British Cemetery Montevideo. The funeral was followed by a memorial service in London on 8 June at the parish church of All Hallows-by-the-Tower. One of the windows of All Hallows now includes a stained glass panel commemorating all who died aboard Royston Grange.

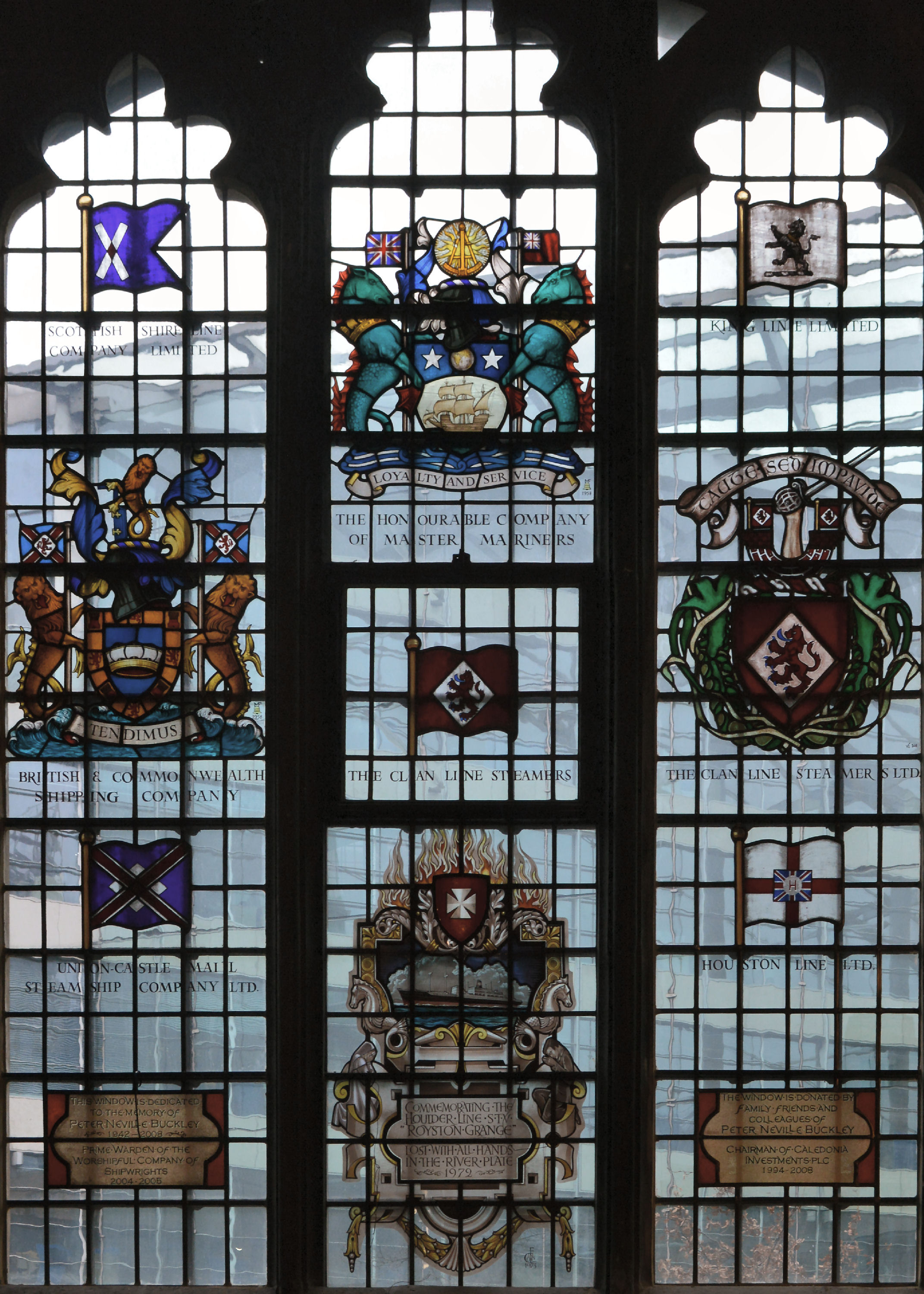
Window in All Hallows-by-the-Tower, with the Royston Grange panel in the lower part of the centre light

Royston Grange was initially towed to Montevideo. The recovery of her smouldering hull by the Uruguayan Navy led to confrontation with the Argentine patrol boats ARA King and ARA Murature, which had been ordered to tow the wreck to Buenos Aires. This was one of a series of maritime incidents that prompted the governments of Argentina and Uruguay to negotiate a new treaty on their maritime frontier, which was concluded the following year.

In March 1974, Royston Grange was towed to Barcelona, where her scrapping began on 20 May 1979. Tien Chee was scrapped at Buenos Aires in August 1976.

== Investigations ==
Argentina, Liberia and the United Kingdom all investigated the disaster. Argentina initially detained Tien Chee's master, pending the outcome of its investigation.

The Liberian inquiry concluded that Tien Chee's master and pilot, in an attempt to get enough water for her deep draught, had probably navigated too far to the south side of the channel, forcing Royston Grange farther south onto the shelf that formed its southern boundary. The bank deflected Royston Grange, causing her to shear to port and strike Tien Chee.

The officers of Royston Grange, it concluded, were probably not to blame, although there may have been some human error in trying to avoid the collision. The master and pilot of Tien Chee probably should not have entered the channel in the first place in the tidal conditions prevailing at the time. The report severely criticised the lack of maintenance of the channel.

In 1972 the United Kingdom held a preliminary inquiry under the Merchant Shipping Act 1894. In 1973 the UK's National Physical Laboratory also conducted tank tests to understand the technical circumstances that led to the collision.

In June 1973 in the House of Commons of the United Kingdom, opposition MP John Prescott claimed that Argentina did not comply with an IMCO recommendation that interested parties should be allowed to attend the inquiry into the disaster. The Minister of State for Aerospace and Shipping, Michael Heseltine, stated that UK inspectors were not allowed access to Tien Chee or to take statements from witnesses pending the holding of the judicial inquiry, but were later shown a record of the proceedings and given a report of the inquiry. They were also invited to attend the final stages of the administrative tribunal. Heseltine also said he was "favourably impressed by the quality of the Liberian Board's findings", and considered that a further inquiry by the United Kingdom would be unlikely to reach different conclusions.

== See also ==
- MV Derbyshire
- Doña Paz

== Bibliography ==
- Burrell, David (1992). Furness Withy 1891–1991. Kendal: World Ship Society. ISBN 0-905617-70-3.
- Harnack, Edwin P (1964) [1903]. All About Ships & Shipping (11th ed.). London: Faber and Faber.
- Nicol, Stuart (2001). MacQueen's Legacy; Ships of the Royal Mail Line. Vol. Two. Brimscombe Port and Charleston, SC: Tempus Publishing. ISBN 0-7524-2119-0.
