= USS Gull (AM-74) =

Minesweeper of the United States Navy

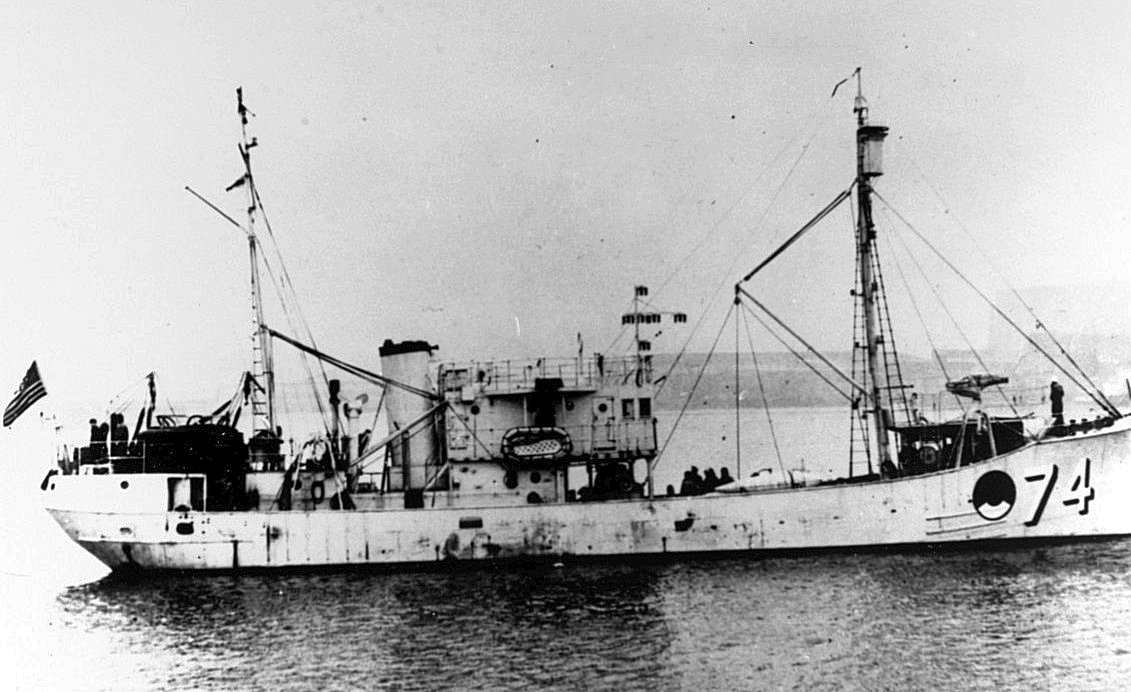
- Gull seen in 1941

History

United States
- Ordered: as Boston College
- Laid down: date unknown
- Launched: 1928
- Acquired: 30 August 1940
- Commissioned: 3 December 1940
- Decommissioned: 25 July 1944
- Stricken: 22 August 1944
- Fate: Sold May 1946 as a commercial vessel; Lost at sea with all hands as F.V. Gudrun 1952

General characteristics
- Displacement: 410 tons
- Length: 124 ft 3 in (37.87 m)
- Beam: 23 ft (7.0 m)
- Draft: 10 ft 8 in (3.25 m)
- Speed: 9 knots (17 km/h)
- Armament: one 3" gun mount

USS Gull (AM-74) was a minesweeper acquired by the U.S. Navy for the dangerous task of removing mines from minefields laid in the water to prevent ships from passing.

The ship was built as the trawler Boston College by the Bath Iron Works, Bath, Maine, in 1928 as first, yard number 119 and U.S. official number 228023, of three trawlers for F. J. O'Hara & Sons of Boston. The trawler was built and registered with slightly larger gross tonnage, 241 GRT, than the second two of 229 GRT, Holy Cross and Georgetown. (Note: The photo of Holy Cross as minesweeper Kite at the linked page shows nearly identical form as the photo of Gull on this page.) Boston College was registered with call sign MHBV, length of 114.0 ft (34.7 m) between perpendiculars of 400 h.p. with a crew of 19 designated as engaged in cod and mackerel fishing, owner Trawler Boston College (Mass.).

The Navy acquired the trawler 30 August 1940 converting it at the Boston Yards of the Bethlehem Steel Corp. 30 September 1940; and commissioned 3 December 1940.

== World War II service ==
Attached to the Inshore Patrol, Gull conducted minesweeping operations in Massachusetts Bay until 28 March 1941 when she sailed for Norfolk, Virginia, via Yorktown, Virginia. Homeported at Norfolk 6 April to 26 August 1941, she operated along the Atlantic coast as far north as Boston, Massachusetts, until sailing the latter date for Argentia, Newfoundland, where she put in 4 September. Gull continued duty as a minesweeper at Argentia until the summer of 1944, calling at Boston for repairs as needed.

== Decommissioning ==
She decommissioned at Quincy, Massachusetts, 25 July 1944. Stricken from the Navy List 22 August 1944, she was transferred to the Maritime Commission for disposal 15 May 1946.

She was sold to operate commercially as Gudrun.

== Lost at sea ==
The Gudrun which left Gloucester on Wednesday, 3 January 1951, for a trip of dabs for Gorton-Pew Fisheries Co. LTD,. Radioed at 3.24 o’clock Sunday morning, 14 January, the terse but grim message, "We are sinking" and followed with her position, as being some 180 miles south of Cape Race, Nfld.

Aboard were Capt. Johann Axel Johannsson of West Medford and a crew of 16 men, including seven Gloucester men. Twelve of the crew are known to be married, and they have a total of 35 children. All seven Gloucester members are married and have 19 children.

Whatever happened is still a mystery, for no indication has ever been given as to what transpired through that night, or what fate was met by the vessel and her men.

=== Gloucester men aboard ===
- Harry W. O’Connell, Jr. 28 years, married
- Alphonse Sutherland, 51 years, married, nine children
- Wilfred J. Mello, 36 years, married, two sons
- August E. Hill, 45 years, married, one son
- Daniel Williams, 40 years, married, two stepdaughters
- James J. Cavanaugh, 45, married, five children

=== Others believed to be crew members ===
- Capt. Johan Axel Johannsson, 46, West Medford, owner-master, married two children
- Matthew L. Whalen, 46 years, mate, Somerville, married, 11 children
- Daniel Meagher, 42 years, first engineer, Saugus, married, two children
- Albert Moulden, 63 years, second engineer, Sharon, married
- Frank B. Nickerson, 49 years, Braintree, married, one child
- John Johnson, 68 years, Boston
- John Kozlowski, 62 years, Tolland, Conn.
