= USS Kite (AM-75) =

Minesweeper of the United States Navy

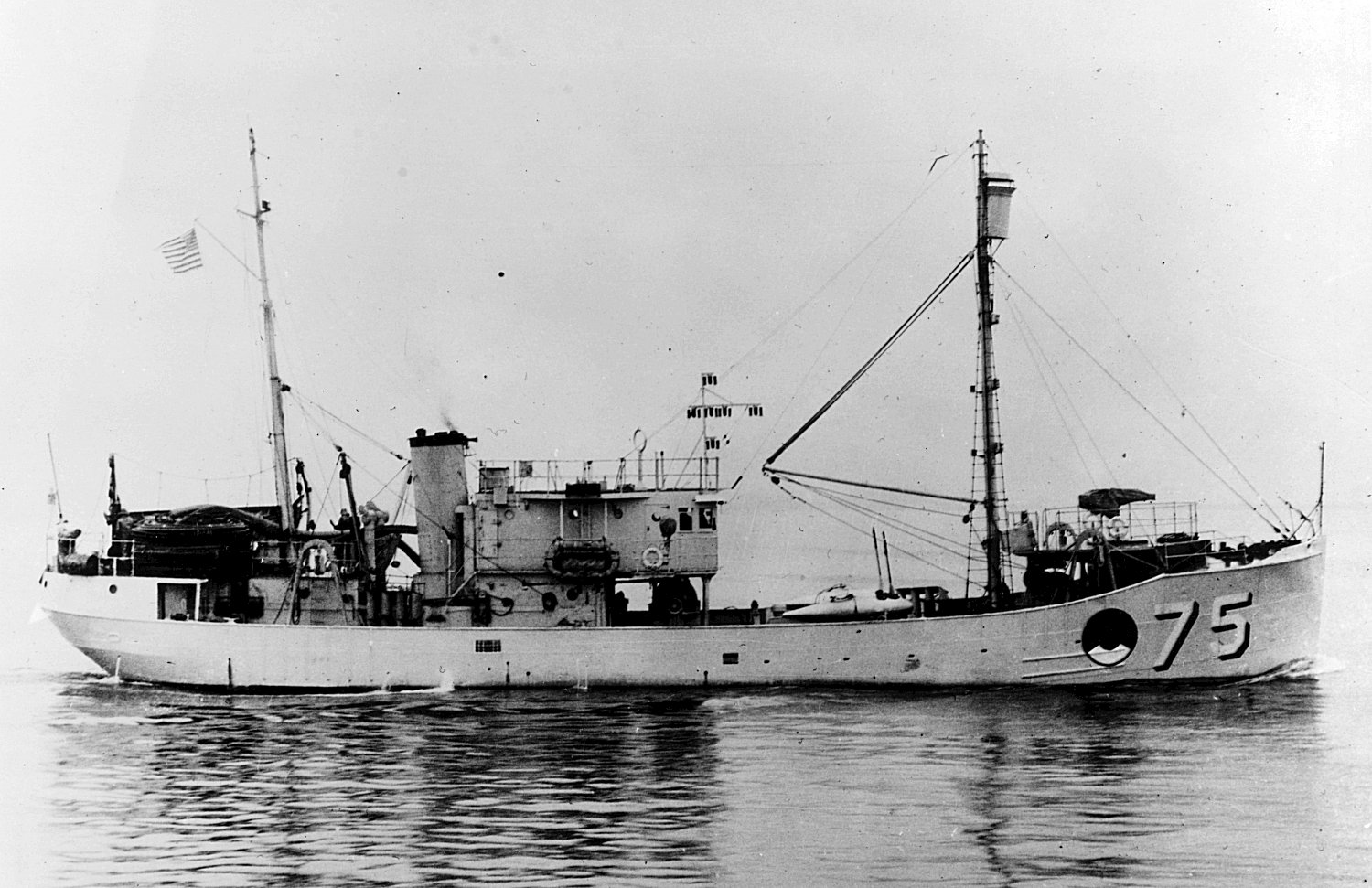
- Kite underway off Boston, Massachusetts, 25 March 1941

History

United States
- Name: USS Kite
- Builder: Bath Iron Works, Bath, Maine
- Laid down: 18 June 1928
- Launched: 24 November 1928, as MV Holy Cross
- Acquired: 11 September 1940
- Commissioned: 3 March 1941, as USS Kite (AM-75)
- Decommissioned: 14 August 1944
- Renamed: Kite, 14 August 1940
- Stricken: 22 August 1944
- Fate: Transferred to the War Shipping Administration, 2 March 1945

General characteristics
- Class & type: Kite-class minesweeper
- Displacement: 482 long tons (490 t)
- Length: 124 ft 3 in (37.87 m)
- Beam: 23 ft (7.0 m)
- Draft: 10 ft 6 in (3.20 m)
- Propulsion: 1 × 360 shp (268 kW) Fairbanks-Morse diesel engine; 1 × shaft
- Speed: 9 knots (17 km/h; 10 mph)
- Armament: 1 × 3"/50 caliber gun

USS Kite (AM-75) was the lead ship of her class of minesweepers of the United States Navy during World War II.

The ship was laid down on 18 June 1928 as the fishing trawler M/V Holy Cross by the Bath Iron Works, Bath, Maine, for F. J. O'Hara and Sons, Inc., Boston, Massachusetts. Launched on 24 November 1928, and delivered on 27 November 1928.

Holy Cross, U.S. official number 228067 call sign MHCK, was 229 GRT with a registered length (between perpendiculars) of 114.7 ft (35.0 m) of 400 h.p. with a crew of 19 designated as engaged in cod and mackerel fishing, owner Trawler Holy Cross (Mass.).

Renamed Kite on 14 August 1940, and acquired by the U.S. Navy on 11 September 1940. Conversion to a minesweeper began on 12 September 1940 by the Bethlehem Steel Co., East Boston, Massachusetts, commissioned as USS Kite (AM-75) on 3 March 1941, conversion completed in April 1941.

== Service history ==
Kite cleared Boston, Massachusetts, 27 March 1941; and, after training exercises with the mine warfare school Yorktown, Virginia, she operated with the Support Force out of Norfolk, Virginia. Five months later she sailed for Newfoundland arriving at Argentia on 31 August for minesweeping operations in the North Atlantic. From August 1941 to 3 May 1944, Kite swept sea lanes in frigid Newfoundland waters.

Clearing Argentia, Kite arrived Boston, Massachusetts, on 7 May and was decommissioned on 14 August 1944 at Quincy, Massachusetts, and struck from the Naval Vessel Register on 22 August 1944. Transferred to the War Shipping Administration on 2 March 1945 and sold. Fate unknown.
