= Martiniano Urriola =

Chilean Colonel (1823–1888)

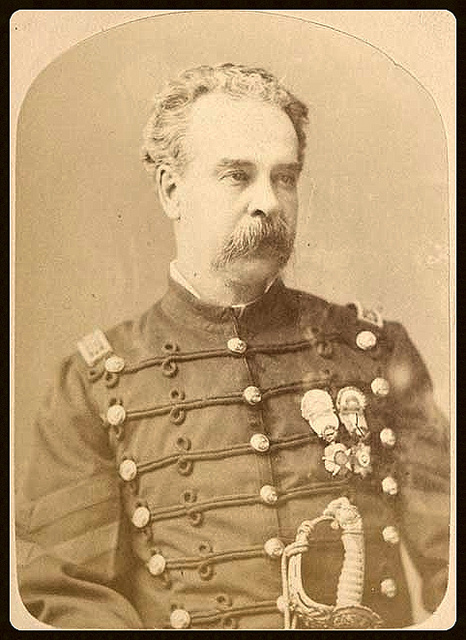
- Born: c. 1823; Santiago, Santiago Metropolitan Region, Chile
- Died: January 25, 1888 (aged 64–65); San Bernardo, Santiago Metropolitan Region, Chile
- Alma mater: Escuela Militar del Libertador Bernardo O'Higgins
- Spouse: Carolina Eléspuru y Pinillos
- Military career
- Allegiance: Conservative Republic; Liberal Republic
- Branch: Chilean Army
- Service years: 1832 – 1888
- Rank: Colonel
- Conflicts: War of the Confederation: Second Restoration Expedition; Battle of Portada de Guías; Battle of Buin; Battle of Yungay; War of the Pacific: Tarapacá campaign; Battle of San Francisco; Battle of Tarapacá; Tacna and Arica campaign; Battle of Tacna; Lima campaign; Battle of San Juan and Chorrillos; Battle of Miraflores

Martiniano Urriola Guzmán (c. 1823 – 1888) was a Chilean colonel of the War of the Pacific. He participated across many campaigns of the war as well as being one of the primary commanders of the Chilean North Operations Army.

== Military career ==
Martiniano was born in about 1823 as the son of Colonel Pedro Urriola Balbontín and Doña Rosario Guzmán Fontecilla at Santiago. He entered the Escuela Militar del Libertador Bernardo O'Higgins in 1832 before graduating in 1837 as a 2nd Lieutenant. He was then made an assistant as his father had to go to Argentina to conduct operations against Marshal Andrés de Santa Cruz. Martiniano then joined the ranks of Alejandro Heredia as he participated in the War of the Confederation. He returned to Chile in 1838 and a year later, he joined the ranks of Manuel Bulnes and fought at the battles of Portada de Guías, Buin and Yungay. During the 1851 Chilean Revolution, his father was killed and Martiniano had to flee for Peru in exile. While staying at Lima, he met Doña Carolina Eléspuru y Pinillos and they would proceed to get married.

After the presidency of Manuel Montt, he returned to Chile with his family and settled at Colchagua and worked on the land there and also commanded the Civic Battalions of Rengo and San Fernando. He was then appointed Governor of the Caupolicán Department and the mayor of Colchagua. In 1874, the Civic Naval Artillery Battalion was founded and Urriola was given command of the Battalion. After the War of the Pacific broke out, Urriola was promoted to Colonel and given command of the I Division. During the Tarapacá Campaign, he occupied Junín as well as participating at the Battle of San Francisco and the Battle of Tarapacá. During the Tacna and Arica campaign, he was wounded during the Battle of Tacna but despite that, he continued to serve as he commanded the III Division during the Lima campaign and participated in the Battle of San Juan and Chorrillos and Battle of Miraflores.

Urriola then participated in the Occupation of Lima along with the forces of Patricio Lynch and returned to the Peruvian capital after briefly returning to Chile in 1882. In the Sierra campaign, Urriola joined Marco Aurelio Arriagada's expedition against Andrés Avelino Cáceres. After the Peruvian defeat at the Battle of Huamachuco, the General Headquarters in Lima ordered an expedition to Ayacucho. Despite Urriola participating in previous engagements in the campaign, Lynch gave command of the expedition to José Antonio Gutiérrez because Urriola wouldn't be able to survive the hardships of the geography due to his age however Lynch eventually gave Urriola command of a Division consisting of the 3rd Pisagua Line Battalion, the Miraflores Battalion, 6 pieces of artillery from the 2nd Artillery Regiment, 90 Horse Grenadiers and 110 Yungay Carabineros. The expedition proved to be extremely deadly for the Chilean forces as the Peruvians enacted Guerrilla warfare against the Chileans, inciting indigenous uprisings as well as the continuous rains and snowfalls, the intense cold and the poor quality of clothing began to take a heavy toll on the Chilean forces but eventually, the Peruvians sued for peace in the Treaty of Ancón due to war exhaustion.
