= Adolfo Holley =

Chilean military officer

Adolfo Holley Urzúa
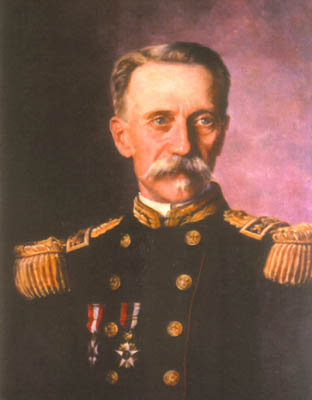

Commander-in-chief of the Chilean Army
- In office 1894–1900
- Preceded by: Marco Aurelio Arriagada
- Succeeded by: Emil Körner

Minister of War and Navy of Chile
- In office 1891–1891
- Preceded by: José Velásquez Bórquez
- Succeeded by: Ventura Blanco Viel

Personal details
- Born: 1833 Talca, Republic of Chile
- Died: 11 November 1914 (aged 80–81) Tacna, Republic of Chile

Military service
- Allegiance: Chile
- Branch/service: Chilean Army
- Battles/wars: Conquest of the Desert; Occupation of Araucanía; War of the Pacific; Battle of Tacna; Lima Campaign; Battle of Chorrillos; Battle of Miraflores; Occupation of Lima; Breña campaign; Chilean Civil War of 1891

Adolfo Holley Urzúa (born in Talca; 1833 – 11 November 1914) was a Chilean general who served in the War of the Pacific and in the 1891 Chilean Civil War and held posts in the resulting government.

Holley embarked upon his military career in the Occupation of the Araucanía in the Arauco War. At the start of the War of the Pacific, he was commissioned as second in command of the regiment Esmeralda when it was created after the division of the older Carampangue in May 1879. Serving in this position, Holley fought in the Battle of Tacna. He was promoted to commander of the regiment when its prior commander, Santiago Amengual, was named chief of the First Division in the Lima Campaign. Holley fought in the Battle of Chorrillos (Battle of San Juan) and the Battle of Miraflores, where his regiment suffered heavy losses. After the capture of Lima and the Chilean occupation of Lima, he remained in Peru with the Esmeralda regiment, taking part in the Breña campaign (Campaign of the Sierra).

On 27 May 1891, Holley was named Minister of War and Navy by the Revolutionary Junta loyal to Congress established in Iquique. He defended the post, defeating the presidential government's forces loyal to José Manuel Balmaceda. Meanwhile, Jorge Montt, a Congressional supporter, took over control of the Santiago Government Junta on September 20. Holley left the government upon Montt's assumption of the constitutional office of President and the start of the new government on 26 December 1891, ending the transitional wartime regime in which he had served.

Holley served as the Senior General and Inspector General of the Army, the commander-in-chief, from 1894 to 1900. Adolfo Holley died in Tacna on 11 November 1914.

Political offices
Preceded by José Velásquez	Minister of War and Navy; 1891	Succeeded by Ventura Blanco Viel
Military offices
Preceded by Marco Aurelio Arriagada	Army Inspector General; 1894-1900	Succeeded by Emilio Körner
