= Arístides Martínez =

Chilean general and politician (1847–1908)

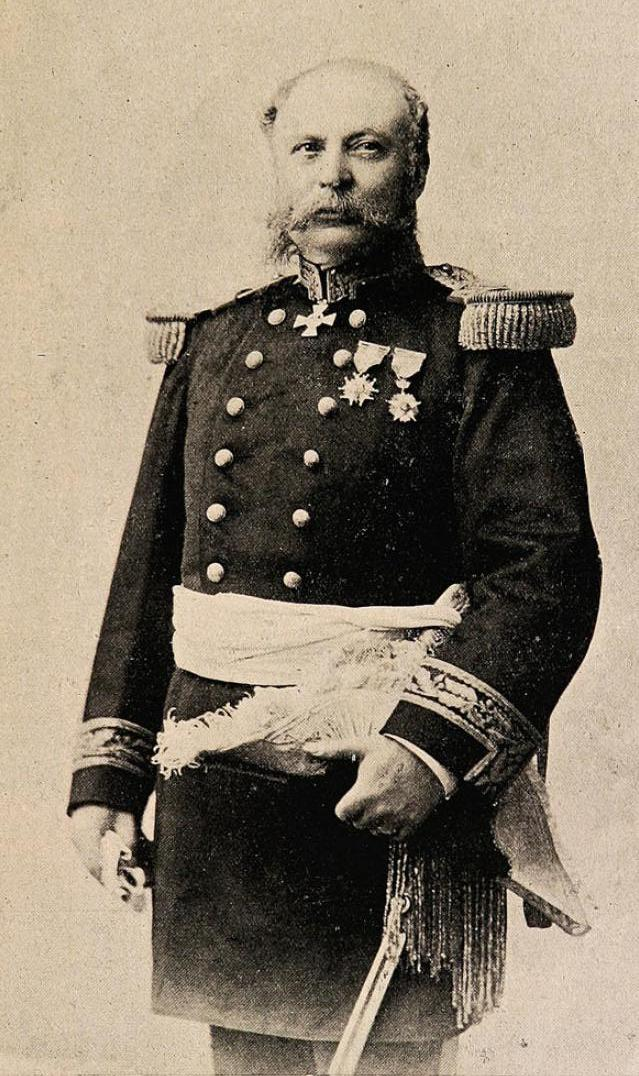
- Martínez in 1904

President of the Senate of Chile
- In office June 2, 1884 – September 15, 1884
- President: Domingo Santa María

Personal details
- Born: 1847 La Serena, Coquimbo, Chile
- Died: March 27, 1908 (aged 60–61) Santiago, Santiago Metropolitan Region, Chile

Military service
- Allegiance: Liberal Republic; Parliamentary Era
- Branch: Chilean Army
- Years of service: 1864 – 1904
- Rank: Division General
- Battles/wars: War of the Pacific: Lima campaign; Battle of San Juan and Chorrillos; Battle of Miraflores

Arístides Martínez Cuadros was a Chilean general and politician who was the president of the Senate of Chile from June 2, 1884, to September 15, 1884. He was also a primary commander throughout the War of the Pacific and its campaigns.

== Family ==
Arístides was the son of Victoriano Martínez Gutiérrez and Josefa Cuadros Pumarada. He got married with María Teresa Cuadros in 1881 but had no children.

Arístides Martínez had 3 brothers. His brother, Marcial, was Minister of Chile in London and befriended the Prince of Wales. His sister Lucia graduated as a doctor at Oxford and his brother Francisco also graduated as a doctor, being a professor at the Faculty of Medicine and became a scientist.

== Military career ==
He studied engineering at the Libertador Bernardo O'Higgins Military Academy. He joined the Chilean Army in 1864, with the rank of second lieutenant and was added to the commission in charge of the fortifications of Valparaíso.

After fulfilling other commissions, he was sent to Araucanía in 1868, where he was assigned to survey plans and explore some rivers and unknown points. At that time, he already had the title of geographer engineer. In 1872 he was sent in commission to Europe under the orders of Colonel Emilio Sotomayor Baeza. He oversaw the manufacture of rifles for the army. The Belgian government granted him an exclusive privilege patent for his invention of two firing systems applicable to revolvers and rifles.

In 1873, he returned and various military engineering commissions were entrusted to him and in 1876 he was elected substitute deputy for Coquimbo from 1876 to 1879. Around the same time in, 1876 he was appointed intendant and commander of arms of Ñuble. During the War of the Pacific, he accompanied the Minister of War, Cornelio Saavedra, as a military engineer. He actively participated in the campaigns of the War of the Pacific, being a member of the general staff and Division General of the Chilean Reserve Army during the Lima Campaign.

=== War of the Pacific ===
As Lieutenant Colonel, the Chilean army sent him in charge of the Lautaro Battalion with 500 men and 12 Grenadiers on horseback heading for Ilo and Pacocha, to draw up plans for the region considering an upcoming massive landing there.

On December 31, 1879, they landed in Ilo, taking possession of the railway yard and the telegraph office. They explored the railroad that led to Moquegua, where the 1st Division of the 2nd Army of the South was located, with 1,300 men from the Granaderos de Cuzco, Canchis, Canas and Grau. Upon arrival at the station, it was full of people who mistook them for Peruvian troops. The population fled, including Lieutenant Chocano with his men, towards the Los Angeles slope.

The Chilean Division spent New Year's Eve in the surroundings of Moquegua. When lightening up on January 1, the city was surrendered by the resident foreigners, and the Chileans entered without resistance. Once the mission was accomplished, the Chilean troops embarked on the railway back to the coast. The Peruvians had removed the rails in several places, but anticipating this, they carried spare rails on the train.

The expedition arrived in Ilo on January 2, embarking for Pisagua, and confirming the feasibility of landing for any future campaigns. Between February 18 and 25, some 9,500 soldiers, who formed 3 divisions, embarked in Pisagua. The convoy arrived in Ilo on the 26th of that month, landing 5,000 troops on the first day, and the remaining 4,500 landed the next day, without resistance. In 1880, he was appointed Chief of Staff of the 2nd Division of the Expeditionary Army.

After the victory at the Battle of Tacna, he held the general command of arms. In 1881 he served as the head of the Reserve Army and went on to participate at the Battle of San Juan and Chorrillos and the Battle of Miraflores. During the Occupation of Lima, he was appointed head of the infantry and later had the commission to persecute the defeated army. He was entrusted with the occupation of the ports of northern Peru and established public services in that area and harvested guano on the island of Lobos.

== Political career ==
After the war, he was mayor of Atacama, general commander of engineers and in charge of supervising the construction of some ports and the Military School. In 1885 he was elected alternate senator for Atacama, from 1882 to 1888.

He was then elected for 3 years, in 1885, as a substitute for Ramón Allende Padín as well as a member of the Permanent War and Navy Commission. After he finished his mandate, Martínez traveled to Europe as assistant to General Baquedano however the Chilean Civil War of 1891 found him temporarily exiled from Chile until his return in 1892 where he was again intendant of Atacama, and two years later he held the position of general inspector of military instruction. He was also director of the Upper Institute from 1894 to 1895.

In 1897 he directed the fortifications of Talcahuano, and the following year he was appointed an expert in the demarcation of the borders with Argentina. He was promoted to brigadier general in 1897 and to division general in 1899 before his retirement in 1904.

He owned copper and gold mines, all located near Santiago, in the commune of Lampa as well as having numerous decorations from Chile and foreign countries but Martínez died at Santiago on March 27, 1908.

By Supreme Decree No. 1768, on September 30, 1937 (B/O No. 40, p. 1116), he was named patronymic hero of the Engineers Regiment No. 3 "Curicó".
