= Lima campaign =

- Part of War of the Pacific
- Movements and battles of the Lima campaign.
Date	December 1880 – January 1881
Location	Departments of Ica and Lima, Peru
Result	Chilean victory: Occupation of Lima and other territories of the Peruvian coast by the Chilean Army.

Belligerents
Chile	Peru

Commanders and leaders
(Chile) Manuel Baquedano (Chile) Patricio Lynch (Chile) José A. Villagrán (Chile) Francisco Gana (Chile) José D. Amunátegui (Chile) Orozimbo Barbosa (Chile) Emilio Sotomayor (Chile) Arístides Martínez (Chile) Pedro Lagos (Chile) Diego Dublé Almeyda (Chile) Toro Herrera (WIA) (Chile) Belisario Zañartu †	(Peru) Nicolás de Piérola (Peru) Pedro Silva Gil (Peru) Miguel Iglesias (Peru) Arnaldo Panizo (Peru) Andrés A. Cáceres (Peru) Pedro José Sevilla (Peru) Mariano Vargas (Peru) Justo P. Dávila; Observers: (Note: Neutral observers during the conflict. Were only to attack in support of Peru if Chilean troops destroyed and looted Lima instead of occupying it.) (United Kingdom of Great Britain and Ireland) J. M. Sterling (Kingdom of Italy) G. Sabrano (French Third Republic) Abel Bergasse du Petit-Thouars

Strength
~39,000 men	~28,000 men

Casualties and losses
1,299 dead (Note: Minimum figures. According to the Chilean Army.); 4,144 wounded 300–400 wounded during the looting of Chorrillos (Note: Chilean soldiers killed during the looting, from a report of a correspondent of El Mercurio de Valparaíso, March 22, 1881.)	5,890 dead (Note: Minimum figures. According to the Peruvian Army.); 3,000 wounded

The Lima campaign was the third land campaign of the War of the Pacific, carried out by Chile between December 1880 and January 1881. The campaign ended with the Chilean occupation of the Peruvian capital and the establishment of the Chilean authority there and in other surrounding territories, which would extend until 1883, with the end of the war.

== Background ==
After the battles of Alto de la Alianza and Arica, which occurred on May 26 and June 7, 1880, respectively, the governments of Bolivia, Chile and Peru began talks to end the war in the port of Arica. In addition, the Lynch Expedition departed from the port with the aim of destroying the sugar estates that contributed financially to Peru and demanding war contributions from the Peruvian landowners.

U.S. intervention was carried out through Secretary of State William M. Evarts, who promoted the Arica Conferences in order to stop the conflict, since, as a result of Chilean attacks, civilian properties had been involuntarily affected, both of Europeans and Americans. The peace negotiations were unsuccessful, however.

The Government of Chile demanded the transfer of some territories already occupied in various ways, which was promoted in the Chilean Congress by the deputy José Manuel Balmaceda, and the new Minister of War and Navy, José Francisco Vergara, pressured by public opinion. Chilean tax revenues began to improve with the taxes collected by the exports of minerals from the regions that were occupied, thereby paying for the war. The tax charged by Chile was $1.60.

Nicolás de Piérola, dictator of Peru, thought that the Chilean landing in the capital would take place in Ancón and Barranco, north of Lima. Against this opinion was Colonel Andrés Avelino Cáceres and other military leaders who were of the opinion that the Chilean landing would take place in the south. De Piérola allocated a large part of the defense to the north and south in Pisco, leaving a force of 3,000 men under the command of Colonel Anselmo Zamudio. Chile sent an expedition under the command of Rear Admiral Patricio Lynch to stop the production of the haciendas on the Peruvian coast. In it, Lynch committed looting and burning, as well as collecting war quotas.

In this expedition, buildings and public services, sugar and cotton farms were affected, where their owners refused to pay the war quotas. Chinese workers worked in the haciendas in conditions of semi-slavery, who were freed as the Chilean troops passed by and joined as porters.

On the coast of Lima, the Chilean ships "Loa" and "Covadonga" were sunk by torpedoes prepared by Peruvian engineers. Faced with these sinkings, the ship "Cochrane" bombed the towns of Chorrillos, Ancón and Chancay.

== Landing in Pisco ==
The port of Chilca, which is located 70 km south of the city of Lima, obtained the preference of the Chilean General Staff. The presence of major Peruvian forces was thought unlikely.

On November 20, 1880, the 1st Division of the Chilean Army, with 8,800 men, embarked on 15 transports and the corvettes Chacabuco and O'Higgins, arrived in Pisco, coming from Arica, under the command of General José Antonio Villagrán. The Division was reinforced with 3,500 soldiers who arrived on December 2 in the corvettes Abtao and Magellan under the command of Colonel Francisco Gana.

Contrary to Andrés Avelino Cáceres' belief that the landing would take place in the south, president de Piérola arranged his troops between Ancón and Barranco, north of Lima; to the south, in the city of Pisco, he left a force of 3,000 soldiers under the command of Colonel Anselmo Zamudio, who, seeing the Chilean numerical superiority, withdrew.

On December 14, the Chilean 1st Division arrived at Tambo de Mora and from there two brigades marched under the command of captain Patricio Lynch. Colonel José Domingo Amunátegui's brigade followed later. On their way through the desert towards the Cañete river's valley, the brigade was forced to return to Pisco due to time constraints caused by a lack of water wells. The delay meant the replacement of General Villagrán by Patricio Lynch, whom Manuel Baquedano appointed the new head of the 1st Division.

== Landing in Curayacu ==
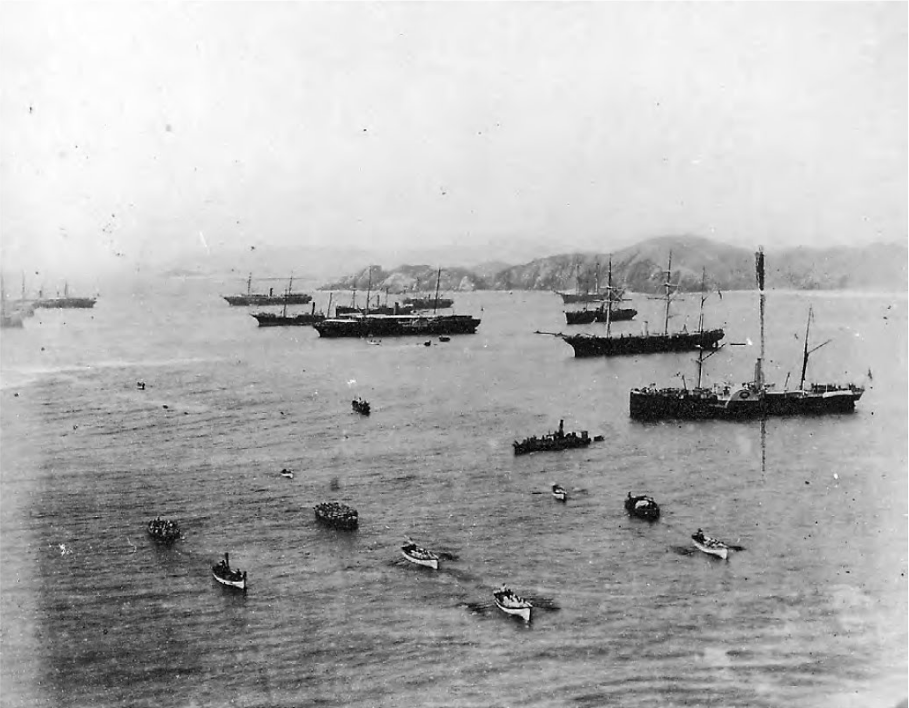
Chilean Army landing in Curayacu

On December 22, 1880, 15,000 soldiers under General Baquedano's command landed in 29 transports, along with the Blanco Encalada and Cochrane armored vehicles, the O'Higgins corvette and the Angamos transport ship.

The Peruvian military command ordered troops under the command of Andrés Avelino Cáceres to march south from Lima in order to occupy Lurín, but the desert and the lack of means of transportation ended up forcing these forces to return to Lima.

The Chilean landing in the ports of Chilca, Curayacu and Pisco was finally carried out without Peruvian opposition. Chilean troops established their camp in the Lurín Valley.

== First encounters ==
On December 25 and 26, after eight days of marching, the two halves of Lynch's Chilean brigade arrive successively, which followed each other 24 hours apart to facilitate the use of food and water. This 180 km journey was made meeting very little Peruvian resistance, which consisted mainly of attacks by local Montoneras.

The Peruvian command sent Colonel Pedro José Sevilla and the Cazadores del Rímac, with 200 cavalry horsemen armed with carbines, to monitor the advance of the Chileans, confronting them in Yerba Buena and then in Bujama. The Chilean command sent Colonel Orozimbo Barbosa's brigade to confront the Peruvian troops, fighting in Manzano on December 27, 1880, where Sevilla was taken prisoner.

Chilean troops confiscated money and livestock from the wealthy owners of the Cañete valley, setting fire to and looting the towns of San Antonio and Mala. A thousand Chinese workers, who had come to put themselves at the disposal of the Chilean regiments, hoping in this way to be freed from their commitments to their owners, helped the Chilean troops as porters. From the confiscated estates, more than six hundred donkeys were seized, which were loaded with sacks, weapons, and kitchen utensils, with the mules loading the food and the barrels of water.

Since January 4, 1881, Peruvian Colonel Mariano Vargas had been in Rinconada de Ate with a force of 340 soldiers, made up of landowners and residents of the area armed with Minié rifles and artillery pieces. Vargas organized his artillery on the Vásquez hill. On January 9, 1881, the Chilean division of Barbosa reached Pampa Grande after a march through Pachacamac. Barboza's division faced Vargas's men in the battle of La Rinconada de Ate, achieving Vargas's withdrawal to Vásquez hill, where the Peruvian artillery came into action but without causing significant losses to the Chilean division, which later After inspecting the area, retired to Pampa Grande.

== Battle of San Juan and Chorrillos ==
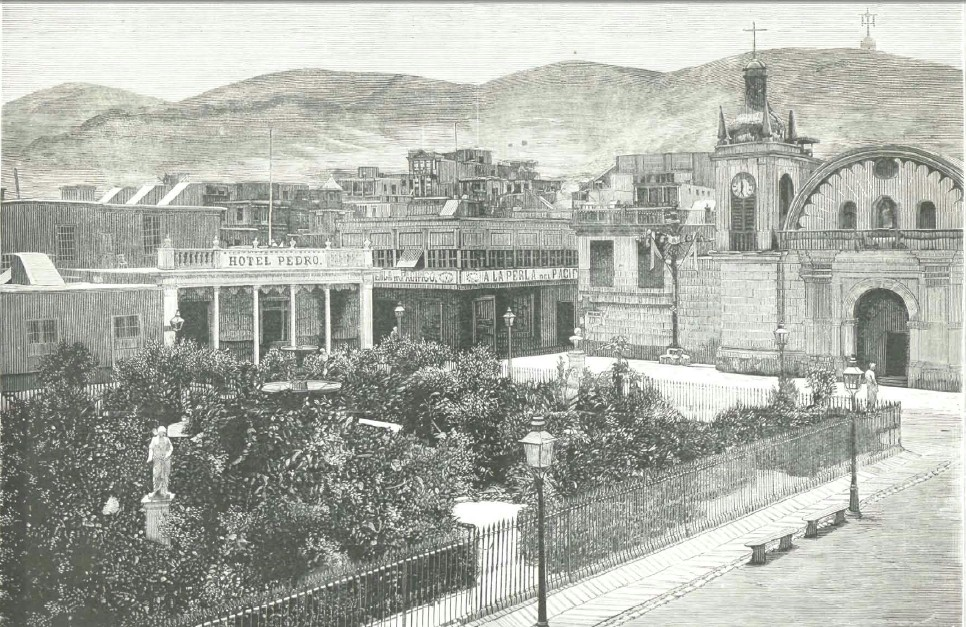
Main square of Chorrillos before the Battle of San Juan

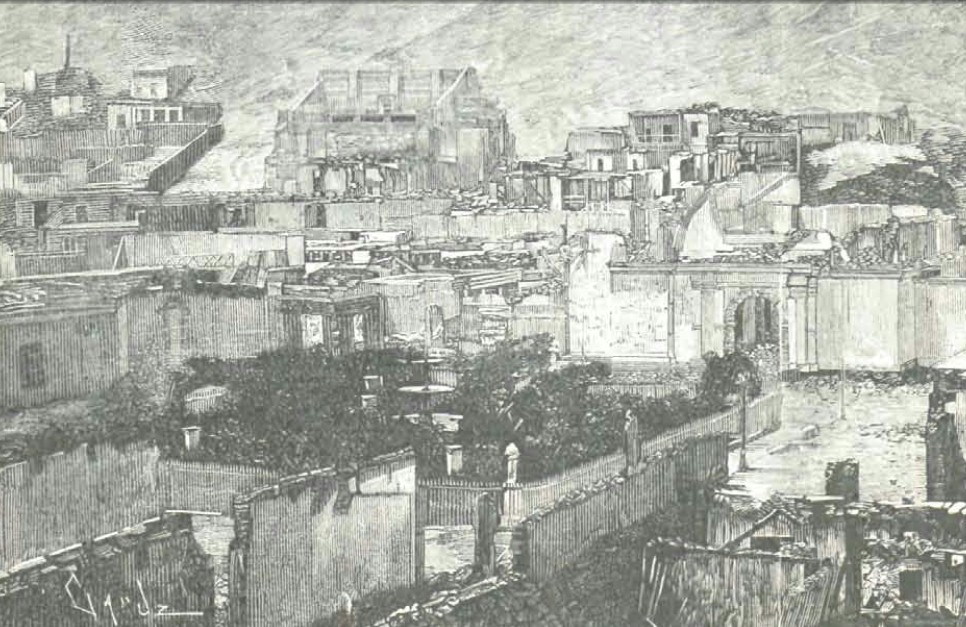
Main square of Chorrillos after the Battle of San Juan

At 4 A.M. on January 13, the battle began with Patricio Lynch's 1st Division facing the 1st Army Corps of Colonel Miguel Iglesias in Villa. Emilio Sotomayor's 2nd division is delayed in entering the combat. Baquedano then ordered Colonel Martínez's reserve to reinforce the First Division, which was overrun by Iglesias' troops. The Chilean reserve then manages to isolate the units of Iglesias from the rest of the Peruvian troops.

The Sotomayor division enters into action by attacking first in Villa, and then turning and heading to the position of San Juan, defended by Colonel Cáceres' IV Army Corps. General Silva sent troops from the III Corps of Dávila to reinforce Cáceres, meanwhile the III Chilean Division of Colonel Pedro Lagos began the attack on the left flank of the III and IV Corps of Dávila and Cáceres. Sotomayor's troops evicted Cáceres from his positions on Cerro San Juan, separating the Peruvian lines at a second point.

Colonel Miguel Iglesias, head of the First Army Corps, brought together the Peruvian Guard No. 1 and Callao No. 9 battalions that had fought in Villa, which combined with the Cajamarca No. 5, Tarma No. 7 and Trujillo No. 11 battalions added 4,500 soldiers in address of Marcavilca.

After the actions of San Juan, part of the 2nd Brigade of the 1st Division, made up of the 4th in line and Chacabuco regiments, plus the navy's artillery advanced towards Marcavilca. Colonel Arnaldo Panizo observed from Morro Solar the withdrawal of Iglesias's forces and supported his withdrawal with the "Provisional" battery, resulting in his offensive. Iglesias organizes the attack with the First Corps and in this way the Chilean advance is stopped near the La Calavera hill. At that point a part of the troops of the Chacabuco Regiment was killed or wounded, with 19 officers and 350 soldiers falling, with their commander Toro Herrera wounded and the second major commander Belisario Zañartu killed in action, with Major Quintavalla taking charge. The same happened in the 4th in Line regiment.

Patricio Lynch sent for reinforcements, which could not arrive, and Baquedano did not learn of his difficulties because he was in the town of Chorrillos. At that time the ammunition began to lack and the infantry had to retreat. Reinforcements were requested from Commander Pedro Lagos who was in the houses of San Juan. The first officer to enlist the help of Lynch's division was, of his own free will, Diego Dublé Almeyda, commander of the Atacama Regiment, who brought with him some ammunition. This allowed the Chilean retreat to be halted and the offensive to continue.

Iglesias carried out a counterattack led by Colonel Justiniano Borgoño's Libres de Trujillo Battalion and Suárez's Zepita No. 29 Battalion, attacking and pushing back the Chilean troops and recovering the positions they had left behind.

At 12:00, the Peruvian I Corps forces left their positions in Marcavilca and withdrew in the direction of Chorrillos and others towards Morro Solar, attacked by the Chileans from Marcavilca. Miguel Iglesias is captured by Chilean forces in the direction of Chorrillos at 12:45 pm after descending from Cerro Panteón. Zepita No. 29 manages to enter Lima Street and fight in Chorrillos.

At 1:45 p.m. at the top of Morro Solar are the last 100 soldiers, among soldiers from different battalions of the 1st Corps and Artilleros del Morro, all under the command of Colonel Arnaldo Panizo, who, surrounded, defend their positions. The machine gun operated by Major Manuel Hurtado y Haza was rendered useless and a 12-piece piece continued to operate. Finally, the Chilean troops occupied the Morro Solar plain. After occupying Chorrillos, the Chileans looted the city and reduced it to ashes.

== Battle of Miraflores ==
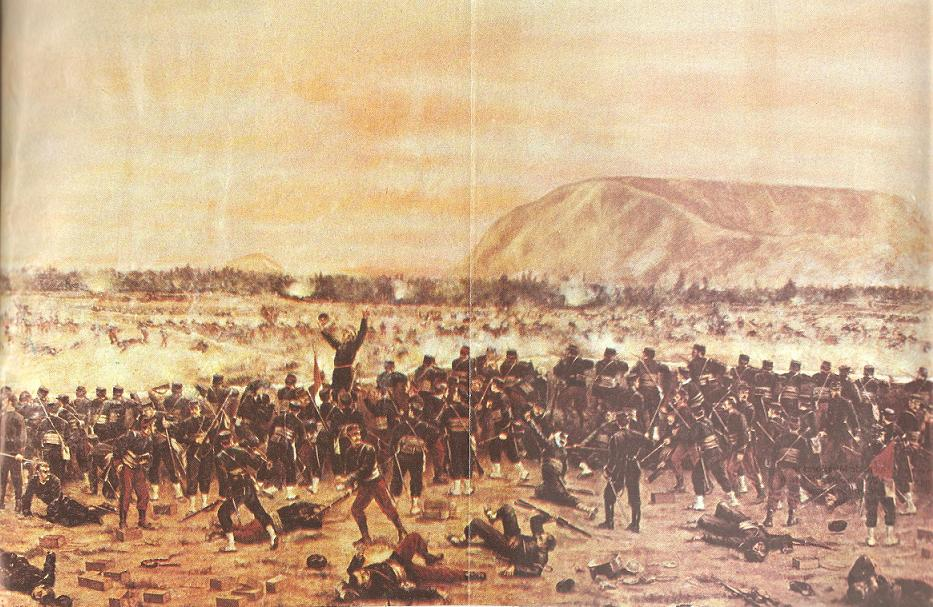
Painting by Juan Lepiani of the battle.

The Peruvian defense line participating in the battle was made up of the civilian population of the city of Lima united with the battalions that had fought in San Juan. At approximately 2:00 p.m. on January 15, 1881, a surprise firefight between groups of both armies began to escalate until combat became general throughout the battle front.

The brigades of the II Chilean Division were in Chorrillos and Barranco advancing towards Miraflores, and Patricio Lynch's division were not in position The III Lagos Division was the closest to the front, and for that reason it was the first to engage in combat with the Peruvian forces. The troops of Andrés Avelino Cáceres, who were defending the right flank in Redoubts 1 and 2, faced off with Francisco Barceló's 2nd Brigade, while Martiniano Urriola's 1st Brigade was deployed in disorder. The Chilean artillery retreats about 1500 meters, since it was thought that an imminent retreat from the Lagos division was expected.

On the left flank, Suárez's troops face the 2nd Brigade of the II Division, while the I Division fights in the center of the line. After two hours of battle the attack is reinforced by two regiments and the bombardment of the ships Blanco Encalada, Cochrane and Huascar to the town of Miraflores. Barceló's brigade attacks the Cáceres line, who retreats from Miraflores. Upon being overwhelmed by this flank and attacked from the rear, the defenses of Redoubts 1, 2 and 3 withdrew from the line.

At 18:30 the Santiago Regiment arrives in Miraflores. Piérola withdraws the rest of the troops who do not fight. Of the 10 strongholds, only the forces of 3 strongholds enter into combat. The mayor of Lima Rufino Torrico hands over the government of the city to Manuel Baquedano, who seizes him to avoid ambushes to the Chilean army at the entrance to Lima. The town of Miraflores was looted and burned.

In the battle of Miraflores, the Chilean army suffered 2,124 casualties, while the Peruvian army had about 3,000.

== Occupation of Lima ==
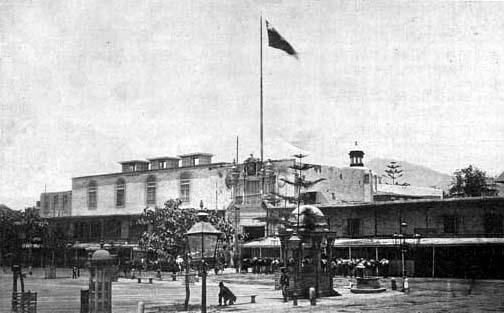
Government Palace during the occupation in 1881.

The occupation began in January 1881, with Chilean troops occupying the capital and establishing a military administration headquartered in the Government Palace.

Reports of Chilean destruction and looting resulted in a meeting between the different observing powers, concluding that such an event would not be allowed in Lima proper. Had the Chilean army destroyed and looted the city as it had done in Barranco, Chorrillos and Miraflores, the observing powers would have used their military power in the form of a bombardment of the city against the occupying army.

In absence of a Peruvian President who was willing to accept their peace terms, on 22 February 1881, the Chileans allowed an open cabildo of notables outside of Lima to elect Francisco García Calderón as president, also allowing him to raise and arm two infantry battalions composed of 400 men each, as well as two small cavalry squadrons in order to give more consistency to the provisional government.

At that time, the U.S. Secretary of State, James G. Blaine, who saw the war as an inadmissible intervention of British capital in the United States' sphere of influence, outlined a new policy in June 1881 reversing the U.S.' previous neutrality for a denial of any territorial annexation of territories. On 26 June 1881, the United States recognized President Calderón as President of Peru. Because of Calderón's refusal to accept the Chilean peace conditions, which involved the cession of Tarapacá and Arica to Chile, he was placed under arrest by the Chileans, with Lizardo Montero Flores succeeding him as provisional president of Peru.

Despite a relatively peaceful administration in comparison to the destruction in Barranco, Chorrillos and Miraflores, the city of Lima was looted by Chilean forces, such as in the case of the National Library of Peru. After the occupation, Chile diverted part of its war efforts to crush Mapuche resistance in the south, with some of its equipment captured from Peruvian troops, as well as civilians. Chilean troops coming from Peru entered Araucanía where they in 1881 defeated the last major Mapuche uprising.

== See also ==
- Naval campaign of the War of the Pacific

== Bibliography ==
- Barros Arana, Diego (1881b). Historia de la guerra del Pacífico (1879–1880) (in Spanish). Vol. II. Santiago, Chile: Librería Central de Servat i C^{a}.
- Basadre, Jorge (1964). Historia de la Republica del Peru, La guerra con Chile (in Spanish). Lima, Peru: Peruamerica S.A. Archived from the original on December 11, 2007.
- Villalobos, Sergio (2004). Chile y Perú, la historia que nos une y nos separa, 1535–1883 (in Spanish) (2 ed.). Chile: Editorial Universitaria. ISBN 9789561116016.
- Sater, William F. (2007). Andean Tragedy: Fighting the War of the Pacific, 1879–1884. Lincoln and London: University of Nebraska Press. ISBN 978-0-8032-4334-7.
- Scheina, Robert L. (2003). Latin America's Wars: The age of the caudillo, 1791–1899. Potomac Books, Inc. ISBN 978-1-57488-450-0.
