= Diego Dublé Almeyda =

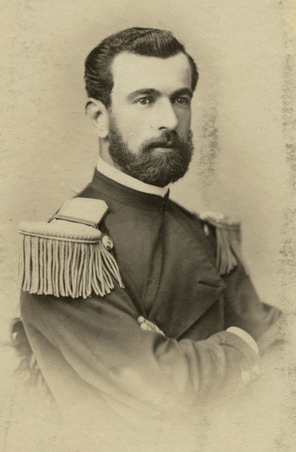
- Born: 1841; Valparaíso, Chile
- Died: May 6, 1922 (aged 80–81); Santiago, Chile
- Spouse: Julia Alquízar de Ferrari
- Children: 10
- Military career
- Allegiance: Chile
- Branch: Chilean Army
- Service years: 1857–1892
- Rank: General de Brigada
- Conflicts: Chincha Islands War; War of the Pacific; Battle of San Francisco; Battle of Tacna; Battle of San Juan and Chorrillos; Battle of Miraflores

Diego Dublé Almeyda (1841 – May 6, 1922) was a Chilean Army officer. From 1874 to 1878 he was governor of governor of Punta Arenas in the Straits of Magellan. In 1876 he travelled on board of Chacabuco to Port Stanley in the Falkland Islands where he bought 300 sheep he then sold to Henry Reynard, contributing to beginning the Patagonian sheep farming boom.
