= Pedro Julio Quintavalla =

Chilean military officer

- Born: 1850; Santiago
- Died: Unknown
- Military career
- Allegiance: Chile
- Rank: Adjutant to the President of the Republic
- Commands: Rere civic brigade
- Conflicts: Chincha Islands War

Pedro Julio Quintavalla (1850– ?) was a Chilean military officer.

He was born in Santiago in 1850. He started his military career in 1865, the year of the campaign against Araucania began. During the Chincha Islands War, he remained stationed on the coast. In 1868, he participated in battles at Collipulli, Perarco, and Curaco, fighting large bands of Moluche Indians. In 1867, he participated in the campaign in the interior of Araucania and was dispatched to Dillohüe. He participated in all military actions on the high Araucanian frontier until 1872. In 1879, he began the campaign on Chile's north coast, during the War of the Pacific against Peru and Bolivia. He survived the bombing of Antofagasta by the Peruvian ship Huáscar, participated in the landings on Pisagua, and took part in the Battle of Dolores, Battle of Tacna, Battle of Chorrillos, and Battle of Miraflores. He participated in the expeditions of Dibujo, Pisco, and Ica and the campaigns in interior Peru and the highlands of Junín and Cerro de Pasco. He commanded the troops that fought at Duneguai against the forces of Peruvian colonel Secoca entrenched in Oijú. In 1885, he was appointed governor of Freiriua. In 1888, he was appointed commander of the Curicó civic battalion. In 1890, he was appointed commander of the Rere civic brigade. In 1896, he was appointed head of the Tiro Military Academy. That year he was also named Adjutant to the President of the Republic. In 1900 he headed a military commission to Europe.
