= Arnaldo Panizo =

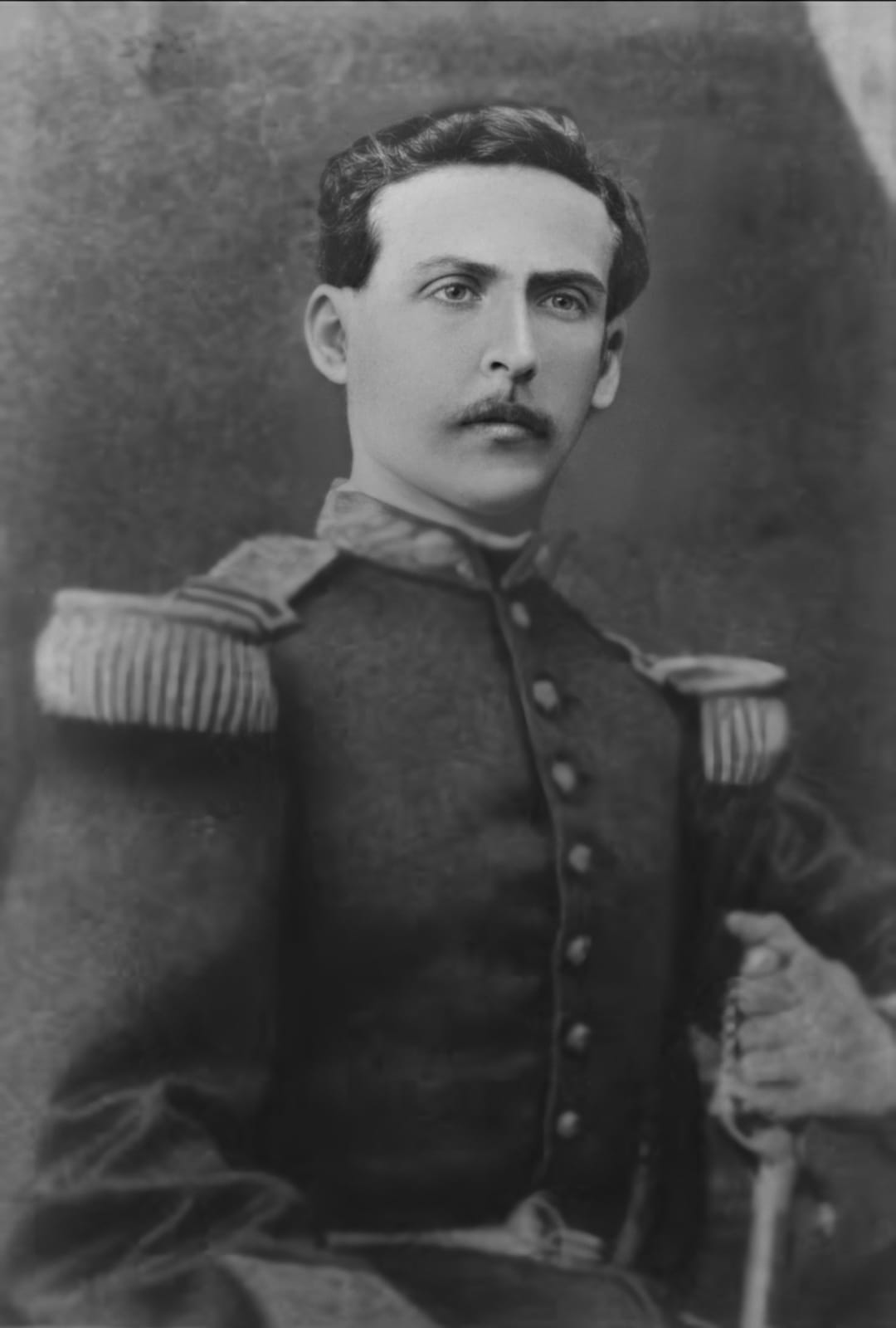
- Born: May 7, 1839; Lima, Lima Province, Peru
- Died: May 7, 1892 (aged 53); Lima, Lima Province, Peru
- Military career
- Allegiance: Peru
- Branch: Peruvian Army
- Service years: 1863 – 1892
- Rank: General
- Conflicts: War of the Pacific: Tacna and Arica campaign; Battle of Tacna; Lima campaign; Battle of San Juan and Chorrillos; Battle of Miraflores; Sierra campaign

Arnaldo Panizo Avasolo (May 7, 1839 - May 7, 1892) was a Peruvian general of the 1857–1860 Ecuadorian–Peruvian War and the War of the Pacific as well as a key commander of the Lima campaign.

== Family ==
Arnaldo Panizo was the son of Rear Admiral Juan José Panizo y Talamantes, a naval hero assassinated during the revolution of Mariano Ignacio Prado and Lizardo Montero Flores on June 24, 1865, and Dolores Avasolo y Ailuardo.

Panizo Abasolo first married his cousin Elena Otero Abasolo, with whom he had six children: Alberto, César, Vidal Canuto, Francisco, Amanda and María Luisa. The latter died during childbirth, an unfortunate event that also caused the death of her mother. Remaining a widower, Arnaldo Panizo contracted a second marriage the following year with Benjamina Vargas O'Dowling, a Peruvian woman from Iquique. With Benjamina Vargas, Panizo Abasolo had six other children: Aníbal, Arnaldo, Gonzalo, Rebeca, Elena and Doloritas, the last one dying at the age of four.

== Military career ==
He entered the Military Naval School on January 8, 1856, at the age of 17. On March 26 of the same year, he was appointed midshipman on the Peruvian frigate Amazonas which was commanded by captain José Boterín.

In 1859, on his own free will, he participated in the Ecuadorian–Peruvian War in the 4th Mountain Artillery Company, under the command of Lieutenant Colonel Cristóbal Pérez de Salazar and in the 3rd Company of the Flying Squadron under Colonel Francisco Bolognesi until the occupation of Guayaquil, returning to Lima under the direction of Marshal Ramón Castilla y Marquezado.

Promoted to lieutenant, he went to the Artillery Column with Plaza in Callao, commanded by Colonel Enrique Pareja. He was then promoted to captain and he commanded the 6th Company of the 1st Marine Battalion under the orders of Colonel Mariano Noriega.

He returned to the Military Naval College, to the Company of Cadets as a teacher with General José Allende being a director there. In the same school, he was promoted to effective captain and sergeant major, being director of Colonel Joaquín Torrico's army. These classes were unknown by the Dictatorial Decree of March 7, 1865, in view of which he requested the indefinite license from him.

He returned to service in his sergeant major class, assigned to the General Staff of the Army of the Center, under the orders of General Francisco Diez Canseco Corbacho. Suppressed said institute, he was appointed instructor of the 1st Lima National Guard Regiment. Once the position was abolished, he was left without a position for 3 months and 29 days.

Called up for duty, he was posted to the Mountain Artillery Battalion as the 3rd chief, under the orders of Colonel Emilio Castañón. Reorganized the corps of the Weapon with the title of Mountain Artillery Regiment, he remained as 2nd chief of the 1st Battalion, under the command of Colonel Federico de la Puente. He was promoted to lieutenant colonel graduated on January 11, 1872, and effective on June 7 of the same year, being 1st . commander of that battalion.

When the Rebellion of Colonels Gutiérrez broke out, he retired from service, refusing to take part in the revolution but not having resolved his resignation when the movement broke out, he rejoined, having contributed to the reestablishment of order under the orders of his superior, Colonel Vidal García y García. He remained in his post until the Corps was reorganized under the title of Field Artillery Regiment, he was appointed 2nd. Chief, a position he held until February 28, when he was appointed 1st Chief.

== War of the Pacific ==
=== Tarapacá, Tacna and Arica campaigns ===
In the War of the Pacific, he was appointed Head of the Fortifications of Arica and under his direction, the forts Santa Rosa, San José and 2 de Mayo were built and artillery from their outline to their conclusion, joined by a line of temporary fortifications. He fought in them on February 27, 1880, with the ironclad Huáscar against the Magallanes as General Commander of the Field Artillery and appointed Chief of the Plaza for that day.

On March 17, when the corvette Unión broke the blockade, Colonel Panizo was appointed, by the General in Chief, General Commander of the Batteries for that act only. The fire from the batteries forced the enemy ships to withdraw, sparing the Peruvian corvette from the attacks they attempted, which saved her from further damage.

It was present in the northern batteries for nine days in which the Chilean transport Angamos bombarded the port and the fortifications.

He participated in the Battle of Tacna on May 26, 1880, as General Commander of the Field Artillery under the orders of General Narciso Campero and Rear Admiral Lizardo Montero. After the disaster of the battle, he was able to save 2 pieces of artillery, 1 machine gun, the remaining ammunition and 36 artillerymen, with whom he accompanied the remnants of the army in their retreat to Tacna and later to Puno where he handed over, by Supreme Order, the personnel, livestock and material to Colonel José la Torre, Chief of the General Staff of the Second Army of the South.

=== Defense of Lima ===
He was General Commander of the battles of Chorrillos and Miraflores, commanding the "Mártir Olaya", "Provisional" and "Marcavilca" batteries on January 13 and 15, 1881, fighting for more than eight hours, holding the last three hours in the main battery “ Martyr Olaya”, along with his artillerymen. He was also the last defender of the last bastion of the Peruvian defense, when Colonel Miguel Iglesias at that time was captured at 12:30 pm and all the mobile defense had been destroyed. Unfortunately, Iglesias takes credit for the last defense, completely forgetting the actions of the Morro Solar gunners.

=== Sierra campaign ===
He was imprisoned for almost a month, being released unconditionally but watched by the Chileans until August when, taking advantage of a cockfight in Ancón, he managed to escape and march to the mountains to continue the war under the orders of President Nicolás de Piérola. In October 1881 he was appointed Commander in Chief of the Army of the South.

Colonel Panizo and General Cáceres firmly opposed the government of García Calderón, whom they described as a Chilean puppet and vowed to not abide by his administration's orders.

On November 6, García Calderón was transferred to Santiago and Lizardo Montero took his place. During this period, Piérola, in order to update the plans and ensure unity, travels to Chosica to meet with Cáceres. In Tarma, he finds out that the General had ignored him but without recognizing García Calderón. Piérola, already without support, resigns in a decree, ordering the forces that obeyed him to place themselves under the command of Cáceres. On December 9, Cáceres orders the southern forces commanded by Panizo to mobilize at the headquarters in Huarochirí. Panizo orders the Prefect of Ayacucho, Benigno Samanéz, to provide all the materials and food for the mobilization of the Army of the South. He then sends letters to Colonels Ibarra, Suárez Moreno and La Torre to join the Army of the Center.

When everything was ready for the mobilization, several desertions occurred, among them those of Colonel José Barredo and in Abancay that of the half Regiment "Dos de Mayo", leaving the plaza of Ayacucho without resources for mobilization. This was received by Cáceres in due time and on December 30, 1881, he issued new orders to the Colonel for his transfer but to Huancayo due to three factors: the typhoid epidemic that was in his army, the constant nocturnal desertions and the persecution that the Chilean army had initiated against the Army of the Center.

After the War of the Pacific he continued in active service but without placement until his death on June 16, 1892.
