= Battle of Tacna order of battle =

Engagement during the War of the Pacific (1879-1883)

The Battle at Tacna was an engagement during the War of the Pacific (1879–1883) between Chile and the Allied Forces of Peru and Bolivia. It was fought on May 20, 1880, with the forces aligned as follows:

== Chilean North Operations Army ==
Commanding General: Manuel Baquedano González
Chief of Staff: Col. Velásquez

=== Infantry ===
I Division
Col. Santiago Amengual
Strength: 2,547 men

- Esmeralda Infantry Regiment (Col. Santiago Amengual) (8 companies)
- Navales Infantry Battalion (Col. Martiniano Urriola) (4 companies)
- Chillán Infantry Battalion (Juan Vargas Pinochet) (4 companies)
- Valparaíso Infantry Battalion (Jacinto Niño) (3 companies)

II Division
Lt. Col. Francisco Barceló
Strength: 2,130 men

- 2nd Line Infantry Regiment (Col. Estanislao del Canto)
- Santiago Infantry Regiment (Lt. Col. Francisco Barceló)
- Atacama Infantry Regiment (Lt. Col. Juan Martínez)

III Division
Col. José Domingo Amunátegui
Strength: 1,858 men

- Artillería de Marina Infantry Regiment
- Coquimbo Infantry Battalion
- Chacabuco Infantry Battalion

IV Division
Col. Orozimbo Barbosa
Strength: 2,285 men

- Lautaro Infantry Battalion
- Cazadores del Desierto Infantry Battalion
- Zapadores Infantry Battalion (Lt. Col. Ricardo Santa Cruz)

Reserve
Col. Mauricio Muñoz
Strength: 2,335 men

- "Buin" 1st Line Infantry Regiment (Col. Juan León García)
- 3rd Line Infantry Regiment (Col. Ricardo Castro)
- 4th Line Infantry Regiment (Col. Luis Solo de Zaldívar)

=== Cavalry ===
- Granaderos Regiment (Horse Grenadiers)
- Cazadores Regiment (Light Cavalry)
- Carabineros de Yungay Regiment (Light Cavalry-Carabiners)

=== Artillery ===
- 37 cannons and 4 machine guns from the 1st Artillery Regiment

== Allies ==
Commanding General: Narciso Campero, Bolivian Army
Strength: 13,650 men

=== I Southern Peruvian Army ===
I Division
Col. Justo Pastor Dávila

- Lima Nº 11 Battalion
- Cazadores de Cuzco Battalion

II Division
Col. Andrés Avelino Cáceres

- Zepita Battalion
- Cazadores de Misti Battalion

III Division
Col. Belisario Suárez

- Arica Battalion
- Pisagua Battalion

IV Division
Col. Jacinto Mendoza

- Victoria Battalion
- Huáscar Battalion

V Division
Col. Alejandro Herrera

- Ayacucho Battalion
- Arequipa Battalion

VI Division
César Canevaro

- Lima Nº 21 Battalion
- Cazadores del Rímac Battalion (Col. Víctor Fajardo)

Nacionales Division
Col. del Solar

- Formed by civilians and policemen of Tacna (the latter from the Peruvian Civil Guard)

Cavalry

- Húsares de Junín Squadron
- Gendarmes de Tacna Squadron
- Guías Squadron
- Flanqueadores de Tacna Squadron

Artillery

- 10 cannons and 3 machine guns

=== Bolivian Army ===
I Division
Col. Severino Zapata

- Viedma Battalion
- Padilla Battalion
- Sucre Battalion

II Division
Col. Claudio Acosta

- Tarija Battalion
- Chorolque Battalion
- Grau Battalion
- Loa Battalion

III Division
Col. Idelfonso Murgia

- Murillo Battalion
- Alianza Battalion

IV Division
Col. Alfonso González

- Aroma Battalion

Cavalry

- Húsares Squadron
- Coraceros Squadron

Artillery

- 6 cannons and 4 machine guns

== Bibliography ==
- Pelayo, Mauricio. "Battle of Tacna". Archived from the original on 2009-12-12.
