= José Antonio Villagrán =

Chilean army general

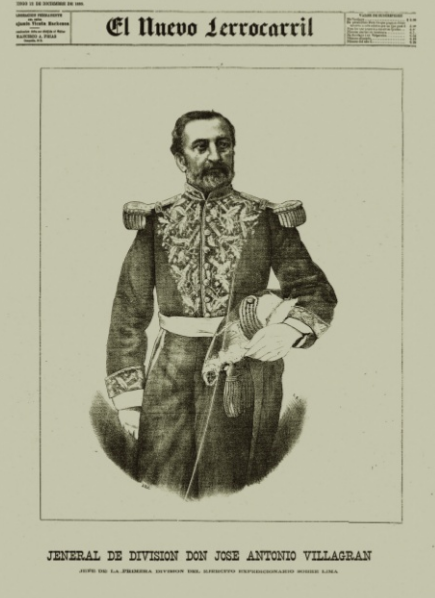
- A portrait of Villagrán depicted in El Nuevo Ferrocarril
- Born: c. 1821; Tucumán Province, United Provinces of the Río de la Plata
- Died: June 17, 1895 (aged 73–74); Valparaíso, Valparaíso Region, Chile
- Military career
- Allegiance: Conservative Republic; Liberal Republic
- Branch: Chilean Army
- Service years: 1838 – 1880
- Rank: Brigadier General
- Conflicts: Chilean Revolution of 1851; Revolution of 1859: Battle of Cerro Grande; Chincha Islands War: Battle of Calderilla; War of the Pacific: Tacna and Arica campaign; Battle of Tacna; Battle of Arica; Lima campaign

José Antonio Villagrán Correas was a Chilean general and politician of Argentine descent who was a primary commander during the War of the Pacific

== Early life ==
He was born around 1821 the son of José Antonio Villagrán and Casimira Correas. In 1836 he entered the Military School and in 1838 he entered the army as a Cadet of the Chillán Battalion.

In January 1838, he was promoted to Second Lieutenant and two years later he was assigned to the Valdivia Regiment. On July 15, 1844 he was promoted to Lieutenant and the following year he was appointed Assistant of the Escuela Militar del Libertador Bernardo O'Higgins, being a math professor there. He entered the University of Chile to study engineering and in 1847 he graduated as Surveyor Engineer. That same year he was promoted to Captain and helped put down the Urriola Mutiny. Around 1846, he married Carolina Lattapiat Honorato and had 4 children with her and had 2 other marriages with 8 more children.

During the Chilean Revolution of 1851, he supported the government of Manuel Montt Torres and the following year he was promoted to Graduate Sergeant Major. In 1853 he was appointed Instructor of the Civic Battalion No. 1 of Concepción and shortly after he was appointed Acting Commander of the 2nd Infantry Regiment "Maipo". He was Assistant to the General Inspectorate of National Guards and First Assistant to the General Arms Command of Santiago. In 1858 he was promoted to Lieutenant Colonel and was appointed Commander of the 2nd Line. He participated in the Revolution of 1859 again supporting the government of Manuel Montt and fought in the Battle of Cerro Grande in April 1859.

He was appointed Commander of the Atacama peacekeeping division and fought in the battles of Vallenar and Copiapó. He was appointed interim Intendant of Atacama and in June 1859 he was promoted to Colonel. During the Chincha Islands War, he was appointed Chief of the Caldera garrison and led the Chilean troops in the Battle of Calderilla.

== War of the Pacific ==
At the outbreak of the war he was appointed chief of the General Staff of the army, carrying out a remarkable job of training the first Chilean infantry that were sent to Peru. On June 26, 1879 he was appointed Inspector General of the Army and National Guards and on October 18 of the same year he was appointed Commander-in-Chief of the Reserve Army. As such, he was left in charge of the nitrate fields expropriated by Peru, openly proposed their nationalization and opposed their handing over to private parties.

On August 29, 1880, he was promoted to Division General. After the departure of Erasmo Escala, there were proposals to appoint Villagrán as Commander in Chief but finally the government appointed Manuel Baquedano in office and Villagrán was appointed chief of the first division of the Army, which, according to the plan, was to march 8 days from Pisco to Lurín in a dry and inhospitable region to clear the backs of the divisions that would land in the Lurín River. Villagrán, in view of the enormous difficulties and the lack of supplies, warned Baquedano that it would not be his responsibility if the march failed. Baquedano answered that the responsibility always belongs to whoever gives the order and asked the government for Villagrán's removal, which the government did. Shortly after, he was appointed Member of the Services Qualifying Commission.

He died at the age of 74 on June 17, 1895.
