= Justo Pastor Dávila =

Peruvian Army colonel (1829–1901)

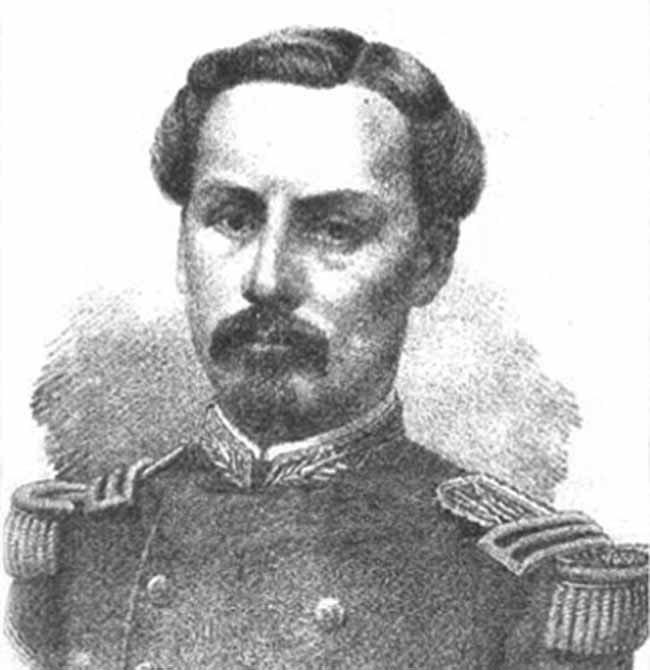
- Born: August 7, 1829; Moquegua, Department of Moquegua, Peru
- Died: January 11, 1901 (aged 71); Lima, Lima Province, Peru
- Burial place: Cementerio Presbítero Matías Maestro, Lima, Lima Province, Peru
- Military career
- Allegiance: Peru
- Branch: Peruvian Army
- Service years: 1843 – ???
- Rank: Colonel
- Conflicts: War of the Pacific: Tarapacá campaign; Battle of Tarapacá; Lima campaign; Battle of San Juan and Chorrillos; Battle of Miraflores; Sierra campaign

Justo Pastor Dávila Herrera (1829-1901) was a Peruvian colonel who was a primary commander throughout the Lima campaign as well as the Sierra campaign during the War of the Pacific as well as the Prefect of Tarapacá in 1879.

== Biography ==
Justo was born on August 7, 1829, at Moquegua as the son of Don Vicente Fernández Dávila Pomareda and Doña Teresa Herrera Maura. He began military service around 1843 and was promoted to Colonel in 1865. On 1879, he was made the Prefect of Tarapacá before the Peruvian involvement in the War of the Pacific began as Mariano Ignacio Prado appointed him as the commander of the Vanguardia Division which was previously commanded by General Manuel G. De la Cotera.

This was due to several personnel changes in the command of the divisions during the month of May and after Belisario Suárez was appointed chief of the general staff, replacing Colonel Bustamante, of which Dávila himself supported. Andrés Avelino Cáceres took his position as chief of the second division, to whom he corresponded by seniority. La Cotera grew angry because of this and refused the position of chief of general staff and went to Lima alone with his assistant. He was replaced by Colonel Don Justo Pastor Dávila who was described as a courageous, impetuous and an extremely active chief.

Later he was appointed head of the Vanguardia Division, made up of the 6th Puno Battalion and the 8th Lima Battalion, and thus began his participation in the land campaigns of this war.

In the general headquarters, the division general Don Juan Buendía appeared as chief, having Colonel Don Juan González as aide-de-camp, Lieutenant Colonel Don Roque Sáenz Peña, Sergeant, Major Don Emilio Coronado, Captain Don Lorenzo Marolin, 1st Lieutenants Mr. Lorenzo Velásquez and Mr. Luis Darcourt and Mr. Benito Neto as secretary. The Vanguard Division was commanded by Colonel Don Justo P. Dávila, composed of the 6th Puno Battalion and 8th Lima Battalion, under the command of Lieutenant Colonels Don Manuel Isaac Chamorro and Don Remijio Morales Bermúdez.

Dávila was also a major critic of other officers as he stated that Generals Villamil and Villegas would be:

Useless officers such as these can land us in hell.

Dávila would go on to participate at the Battle of Tarapacá, the Battle of San Juan and Chorrillos and the Battle of Miraflores before going on to be a primary commander at the Sierra campaign.
