= Juan Fanning =

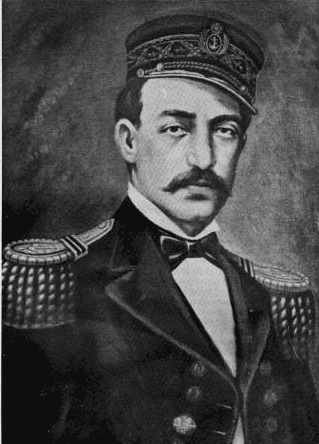
- Born: April 3, 1823; Lambayeque, Peru
- Died: January 16, 1881 (aged 56); Lima, Peru
- Military career
- Allegiance: Peru
- Branch: Peruvian Navy
- Service years: 1839–1880
- Rank: Captain
- Conflicts: War of the Pacific: Bombardment of Callao; Battle of Miraflores

Captain Juan Fanning (April 3, 1823 – January 16, 1881) was a naval officer in the Peruvian military who led a memorable charge against the invading Chilean army during the Battle of Miraflores. Fanning was mortally wounded during the charge, and the fall of Miraflores led to the Chilean occupation of Lima in 1881.

Fanning, the son of American businessman John Fanning and Peruvian lady Micaela Garcia, was born in Lambayeque in 1824. He joined the Peruvian Navy at age 15 and received his first commission as junior officer of the warship Libertad. He fought as Corvette Captain during the 1866 war with Spain, and from April to September 1879 was posted in Arica.

During the War of the Pacific, the Chilean army invaded Peru and attacked the Miraflores District outside Lima on January 15, 1881. Fanning's unit was redeployed from the port and ordered to mount a counter-offensive. Fanning led a gallant charge which drove back the enemy. However, other Peruvian units began to withdraw as the Chilean forces received reinforcements. Fanning's position was overrun after his brigade ran out of ammunition.

Fanning was mortally wounded during the charge. Taken back to Lima, he died at his wife's side. His last words were reputed to be "¡Estoy muriendo por mi país!" ("I am dying for my country!"). The Peruvian military unit "Capitán de Navío Juan Fanning" was established in his honor.
