= Rufino Torrico =

Peruvian politician

José Rufino Torrico de Mendiburu
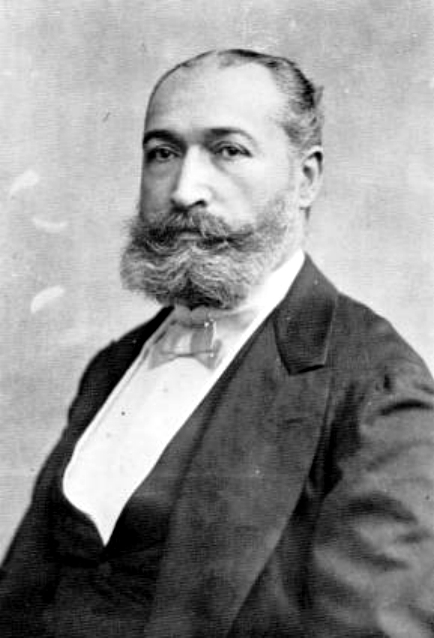

Personal details
- Born: 1833 Lima, Peru
- Died: October 14, 1920 Lima, Peru
- Resting place: Presbítero Maestro
- Party: Constitutional Party
- Parent(s): Juan Crisóstomo Torrico; María Manuela de Mendiburu
- Education: Guadalupe College
- Profession: Lawyer
- Affiliations: National Club

Military service
- Branch/service: Peruvian Army
- Years of service: 1851–1872
- Rank: Colonel
- Battles/wars: Liberal Revolution of 1854: Battle of La Palma

José Rufino Torrico de Mendiburu (Lima; 1833 — October 14, 1920) was a Peruvian soldier and politician who served as Mayor of Lima three times: in 1880–1881, 1883–1884 and 1895. He also served in the Peruvian Army, fighting in the Battle of La Palma that ended the Liberal Revolution of 1854 and reaching the rank of colonel before his retirement in 1872.

In January 1881, his management helped to partially stop the violence and looting of Lima by soldiers retreating from the Battle of Miraflores and he was the highest Peruvian authority at the time of the entry of Chilean troops into the Peruvian capital. After the War of the Pacific, he joined the Constitutional Party of Andrés Avelino Cáceres, whom he served as Minister of War and Navy (1886–87), and of Government and Police (1894–95). He was also a senator in the Congress of the Republic. In 1895, immediately after the civil war between Caceristas and Pierolistas, he again took charge of the government of Lima.

Jirón Rufino Torrico, a major street in the historic centre of Lima, bears his name.

== See also ==
- Juan Crisóstomo Torrico
