= Occupation of Lima =

Chilean occupation in Peru, 1881–1883

Occupation of Lima Ocupación de Lima (Spanish)
- 1881–1883
- Flag

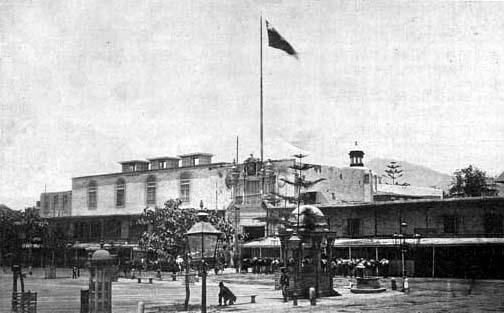
- Government Palace in 1881
- Status: Military occupation
- Capital: Lima (Note: The military administration was composed of Lima proper (today Lima District), as well as its surroundings, including other urban centers, such as Callao and Chorillos.) (Note: In 1882, provisional president Lizardo Montero issued a Supreme decree that transferred the capital from Lima to Arequipa for the duration of its occupation, with the latter receiving the name Independent Republic of Arequipa (Spanish: República Independiente de Arequipa), which appeared on passports issued at the time.)
- Common languages: Spanish
- President
  - 1876–1881: Aníbal Pinto
  - 1881–1886: Domingo Santa María
- Commander in Chief of the Occupation Forces
  - 1881: Cornelio Saavedra
  - 1881: Pedro Lagos
  - 1881–1883: Patricio Lynch
- Historical era: War of the Pacific
  - Lima campaign: 17 January 1881
  - Treaty of Ancón: 23 October 1883
Preceded by	Succeeded by
Peru	Peru

The occupation of Lima by the Chilean Army in 1881–1883 was an event in the land campaign phase of the War of the Pacific (1879–1883).

Lima was defended by the remnants of the Peruvian army and crowds of civilians in the lines of San Juan and Miraflores. As the invading army advanced, the towns of Chorrillos and Barranco were occupied on January 13, 1881, while the town of Miraflores was captured on January 16, after the Battle of Miraflores; finally the city of Lima was taken and held from January 17, 1881, until October 23, 1883, when Miguel Iglesias regained control of the Peruvian government.

== Background ==
Chilean troops had decades before the War of the Pacific occupied Lima from January to October 1839. The occupation led by Manuel Bulnes was carried out to stabilize the new regime that had emerged in Peru following the dissolution of the Peru-Bolivia Confederation.

In January 1881, Chile controlled the sea along the coasts of Peru, as well as the provinces of Tacna, Arica and Tarapacá. The Chilean troops disembarked in the Peruvian towns of Pisco and Chilca, located to the south of Lima. General Manuel Baquedano was in control of the army of Chile during the Lima campaign.

Lima was going to be defended at first by the remaining Peruvian army and by a vast number of civilians in the line of San Juan–Chorrillos. The American engineer Paul Boyton narrated:

The troops were of natives who had been recruited in the mountain ranges and forced to fight, hundreds of them never had seen before a city.

On the other hand, the strategic line of Miraflores was defended by more troops than civilians. Nevertheless, the Chilean Army saw itself successful in the battles of San Juan, Chorrillos and Miraflores, razing the towns, and allowing for an easy occupation of the Peruvian capital.

With little effective Peruvian central government remaining, Chile pursued an ambitious campaign throughout Peru, especially along the coast and in the central highlands, penetrating as far north as Cajamarca, seeking to eliminate any source of resistance against the new occupation authority.

=== Chinese–Chilean cooperation ===
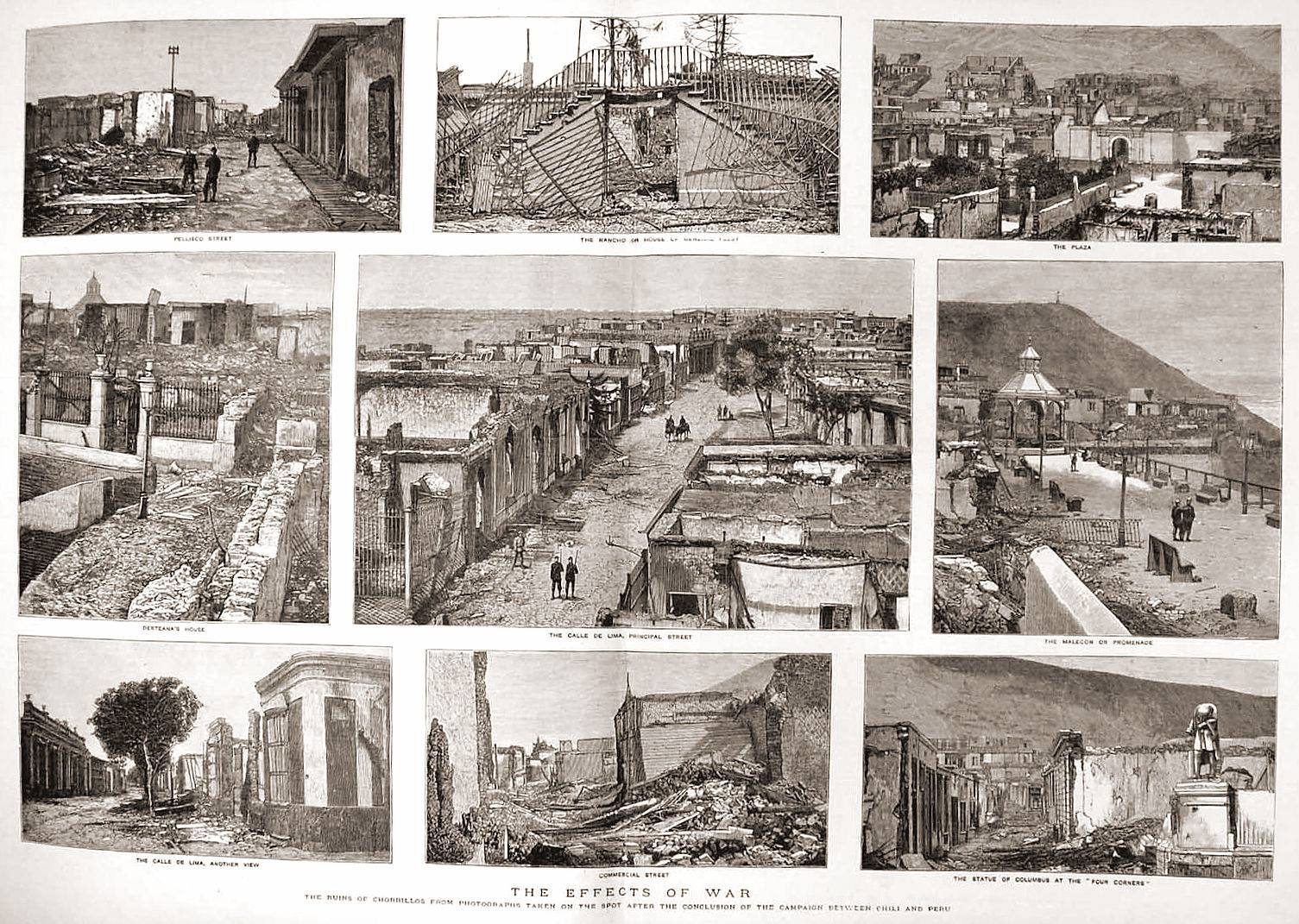
Chorrillos and the consequences of the war, January 1881

As the war progressed to Chile's advantage, the Chilean Army liberated thousands of Chinese coolies who had agreed to come to work in Peruvian haciendas, escaping from the harsh conditions in their own homeland and seeking a better future in Peru.

The liberated Chinese served as helpers with the Chilean army and even formed a regiment under the command of Patricio Lynch, whom the Chinese named the Red Prince since he spoke Cantonese, which he had learned during his campaigns in China as an officer in the British Navy, and the Chinese were prone to trusting a man who could speak to them in their own language and whom they felt a connection with.

Many Chinese saw the Chilean army as "liberators", in a very controversial decision by which they are mostly deemed as traitors by many of their own countrymen in Peru; in Pacasmayo 600 to 800 Chinese forced labourers looted the sugar estates and this scene was repeated in the Chicama, Lambayeque and Cañete Valleys. The Chinese also fought alongside the Chileans in the battles of San Juan–Chorrillos and Miraflores, and there was also rioting and looting by non-Chinese workers in the coastal cities. As Heraclio Bonilla has observed; oligarchs soon came to fear the popular clashes more than the Chileans, and this was an important reason why they sued for peace.

— Mary Turner, From chattel slaves to wage slaves: dynamics of labour bargaining in the Americas (1995)

Due to the Chinese support for Chile throughout the War of the Pacific, relations between Peruvians and Chinese became increasingly tenser in the aftermath. After the war, armed indigenous peasants sacked and occupied haciendas of landed elite criollo "collaborationists" in the central Sierra, while indigenous and mestizo Peruvians murdered Chinese shopkeepers in Lima; in response to Chinese coolies revolted and even joined the Chilean Army. Even in the 20th century, memory of Chinese support for Chile was so deep that Manuel A. Odría, once dictator of Peru, issued a ban against Chinese immigration as a punishment for their betrayal.

=== Armistice of San Juan ===
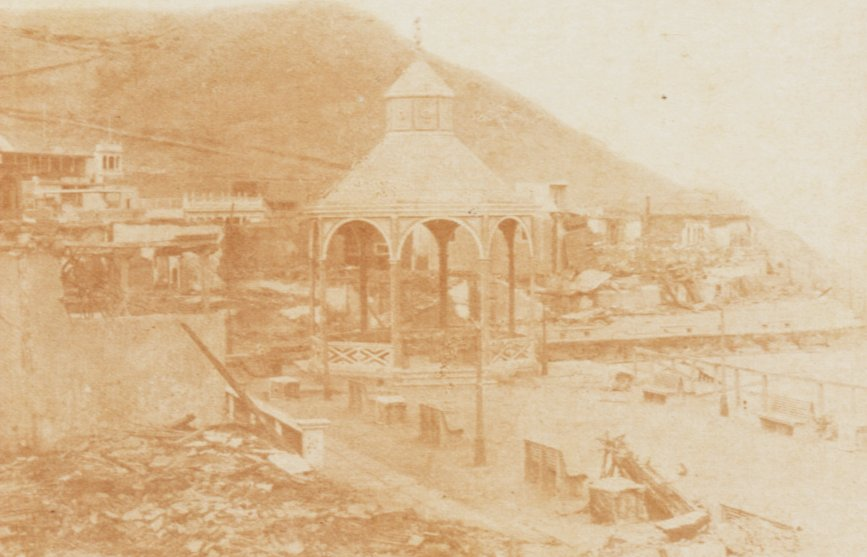
War aftermath in Chorrillos

On January 14, the Chilean minister of war in campaign José Francisco Vergara sent his secretary Isidoro Errázuriz in the company of Colonel Miguel Iglesias, who had been captured by Baquedano, to talk with Piérola to avoid more bloodshed. For the armistice, the ships of Callao and the disarmament of the forts were requested. Piérola replied that he would only negotiate with duly authorized ministers. After that answer, Baquedano ordered to prepare the continuation of the battle for the 15th.

However, Vergara's attempt was closely followed by the diplomatic corps of Lima, whose dean by seniority was the consul of Argentina and Bolivia, Jorge Tezanos-Pinto y Sánchez de Bustamante (1821-1897). The diplomats first spoke with the Peruvian representatives and then requested an appointment with Baquedano, who agreed for a meeting the following day. Negotiations were unsuccessful, as Peruvian troops opened fire on Chilean troops after misunderstanding their advance for a troop reconnaissance between both parties as an attack, resuming the fighting.

== Preparations ==
=== Scuttling of the Peruvian fleet in El Callao ===
After the battles of Chorrillos and Miraflores, the Secretary of the Navy, Captain Manuel Villar Olivera, ordered the destruction of the coastal batteries and the ships of the Peruvian squad. The prefect and commander of the batteries Luis Germán Astete and the captain Manuel Villavicencio were in charge of this task. The Peruvian ships, among them, the corvette Unión and the monitor Atahualpa, were beached, set on fire and sunk by the Peruvians themselves to prevent them from falling into Chilean hands.

Chilean Rear Admiral Galvarino Riveros Cárdenas noted in a long testimony:

[...] at 4 a.m. it was noticed in that port that a fire was declared in all the enemy ships sheltered in the dock and moments later, a series of explosions began to be felt that lasted all day and part of the next, produced by the fire of the powder magazines of the forts the charges of gunpowder and dynamite with which the enemy tried to explode their cannons. [...]

=== Foreign intervention ===
Prior to the occupation of Lima there were fires and sackings by inebriated Chilean soldiers in the towns of Chorrillos, Barranco and Miraflores, and even killings among themselves; as quoted by both Peruvian historians like Jorge Basadre and Chilean historians like Benjamín Vicuña Mackenna.

Reports of Chilean destruction and looting resulted in a meeting on between the neutral powers, who, concerned about the protection of neutral individuals, signed a resolution called the Memorandum of Tallenay, concluding that such events would not be allowed in Lima proper. Had the Chilean army destroyed and looted the city as it had done in Barranco, Chorrillos and Miraflores, the observing powers would have used their military power in the form of a bombardment of the city against the occupying army. In the meetings held at the Chilean barracks in Miraflores to carry out the military occupation of the Peruvian capital, General Manuel Baquedano met with representatives of the diplomatic corps and with Admirals Bergasse du Petit Thouars and J.M. Stirling.

Admiral Stirling and I hoped to produce some pressure on the Chileans without making threats and I think we have been well successful [...] Lima came to be saved from almost certain destruction on the part of the Chileans after the two battles lost by Piérola — this city was peacefully occupied by Chileans.

— French Admiral Abel-Nicolas Bergasse du Petit-Thouars

Under the protection of the consuls and foreign admirals, talks began between General Baquedano and Mayor Rufino Torrico in order to agree on the entry of the Chilean army to the Peruvian capital. Baquedano requested that Torrico first disarm the batteries of the "Ciudadela Piérola", located on the top of San Cristóbal Hill, to avoid fighting between Peruvians and Chileans in the city.

=== Luis Astete's entrance into Lima ===
On Sunday afternoon the 16th, Prefect of Callao Luis Germán Astete arrived in Lima from the port, accompanied by more than 1,000 soldiers. Astete left the Peruvian capital while his soldiers plundered and plundered the city. That night, the crime reached its highest intensity. This fact has been related by several witnesses, with small variations:

From very early on it was understood that the liquor was producing its effects, and that the fact that the mob was armed could be the cause of disturbances. Nothing was done to imprison these men and all authority was gone. Despite this, no one imagined what happened next. Around noon the houses and warehouses in various parts of the city were opened and looted; the number and fury of the mutineers increased because there was no one who could contain them. In the afternoon, all the Chinese warehouses on Malambo Street had been emptied, and many of their owners had paid with their lives for the intention of defending their properties. Theft was the motive for so much crime; murder, loitering and arson, the end. Rifle bullets flew in every direction and bombs exploded everywhere. Colonel Astete, prefect of Callao, brought sailors and soldiers from that port, it was unknown for what purpose. It surely was not to fight, since he allowed his people to get drunk and disband themselves while armed. This happened around 7 p.m. In this way he added new fuels to the bonfire of communism and new actors who took part in the carnival of vice and crime that had already begun and that spread terror in Lima and Callao until the next morning, when foreigners of all nationalities went out to meet them and revealed their strength and their purpose to not let the scandals continue.

— Ahumada Moreno

Saturday night passed tolerably quiet; On Sunday the storm was brewing and, during the day, General Astete tried to make a revolution in view of the fact that General Suárez wanted to give in to the conditions of the Chileans, while the first of those named was about to continue the fight. He brought 1,500 soldiers from Callao, but he was unsuccessful in his decision and at four in the afternoon on Sunday the Peruvian soldiers began looting and looting the city [...] The soldiers mainly pursued the poor Chinese, many of whom they killed, as well as some Italian grocers [...] The fires continued during the night and the firemen had to fight with the soldiers to be able to extinguish them, dying some of them, one Englishman and some Italians.

— British citizen Robert Ramsay Sturrock, in a letter dated 18 January 1881.

=== Looting and lawlessness in Lima ===
Upon his return to Lima from Chorrillos, Mayor Rufino Torrico encountered the excesses committed by dispersed Peruvians against the coolies and their businesses, information that he communicated to the foreign diplomatic corps.

In the city, there were both the dissolved rearguard from Callao and the Peruvian soldiers retreating from Miraflores, who committed assassinations and looting mainly against Chinese coolies, in revenge for their cooperation with the Chilean Army and perceived betrayal as a result of their participation against Peru, such as in the Blockade of Iquique. The attacks and murders at the hands of blacks and Peruvian montoneros against Chinese coolies continued during the following months in Callao, Cañete and Cerro Azul; at the end of the war, there were between 4,000 and 5,000 Chinese dead. The attacks also took place against Chinese merchants who refused to accept Peruvian banknotes. (Note: Because in Peru there was no legislation in this regard, a banking debauchery arose in which each bank issued its own banknotes, accepted by high commerce and tax offices. The supreme decree of August 11, 1875 ordered that, as of 1876, only the banknotes of the Associated Banks would be valid.)

This looting would have occurred as a reaction to the support that a group of Chinese coolies gave to the Chilean forces. A rumor spread that coolie spies in Lima had provided information to the Chileans, indicating the convenient routes for the capture of the city; however, the latter has not been proven. When the Peruvian reserve army took up its post in Miraflores, Lima was left without a garrison, since even the Civil Guard was sent to the front, which would have left an open field for such excesses to take place.

To stop these excesses and prevent others, Mayor Torrico handed over arms to the Dársena dock fire chief, Mr. Champeaux, to form an Urban Guard made up of foreign firefighters belonging to the companies Roma, France and Británica Victoria, which aimed to protect the city and disarm the scattered Peruvian bandits who attacked Chinese and foreign merchants, and raided their stores. The foreign Urban Guard restored order in the Peruvian capital and, for this action, the Ladies of Lima Society (Note: Patriotic Union of Ladies of Lima Society (Spanish: Sociedad Unión Patriótica De Señoras De Lima)) decorated the members of the guard with a medal on the same year.

== Events during ==
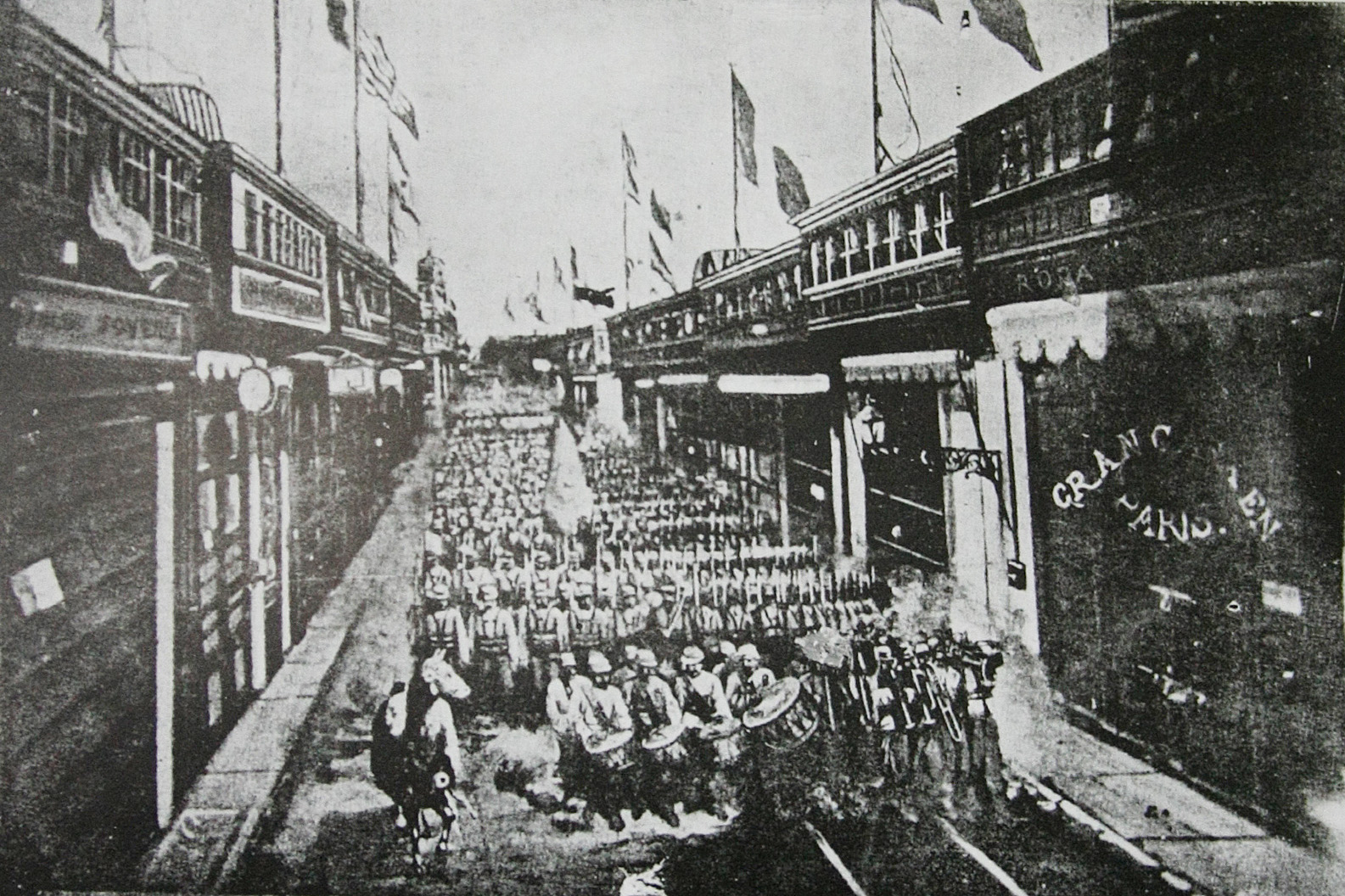
Chilean Regiment "1° de Línea" entering Lima

After the return of General Manuel Baquedano to Chile, Generals Cornelio Saavedra and Pedro Lagos were left to govern the city; on May 17, 1881, the Chilean government appointed Counter admiral Patricio Lynch as commander of the army of operations and political chief of Peru.

During the occupation of Lima, Chilean military authorities pillaged Peruvian public buildings, turned the old University of San Marcos and the recently inaugurated Palacio de la Exposición into a barracks, raided medical schools and other institutions of education, and carried away a series of monuments and artwork that had adorned the city.

On March 10, 1881, Chilean troops began to occupy several important cultural centers, including the University of San Marcos, the College of Guadalupe, Colegio San Carlos, the School of Engineers, the School of Art, the National Military School, the State Printing facility, the Exposition Palace, the Botanical Gardens, the School of Mining, and the School of Medicine. The Chilean army plundered the contents of the Peruvian National Library in Lima and transported thousands of books (including many centuries-old original Spanish, Peruvian and Colonial books) to Santiago de Chile. The Chilean Army recorded sending a total of 103 large crates and another 80 parcels, to Ignacy Domeyko and Diego Barros Arana, at the University of Chile. In August 1881, an inventory was published under the title List of books brought from Peru in the Official Journal of the Republic of Chile. On the way to Chile, various texts from the library were lost to private collectors to make space for the, more important, Chilean armament. When Ricardo Palma was appointed Director of the National Library after the occupation he found that only 378 of its 56,000 books were left. In November 2007, the Chilean government returned 3,778 books to the National Library of Peru.

== Resistance ==
The Peruvian resistance continued for three more years. The leader of the resistance was General Andrés Cáceres (nicknamed the Warlock of the Andes), who would later be elected president of Peru. Under his leadership, the Peruvian militia forces heightened with Indian montoneras inflicted several painful blows upon the Chilean army in small battles such as Marcavalle, Concepción and San Pablo, forcing Colonel Estanislao del Canto's division to return to Lima in 1882. However, Caceres was conclusively defeated by Colonel Alejandro Gorostiaga at Huamachuco on July 10, 1883. After this battle, there was little further resistance. Finally, on 20 October 1883, Peru and Chile signed the Treaty of Ancón, by which Peru's Tarapacá province was ceded to the victor; on its part, Bolivia was forced to cede Antofagasta.

== Impact in Chile ==
After the occupation of Lima, Chile diverted part of its war efforts to crush Mapuche resistance in the south. Chilean troops coming from Peru entered Araucanía where they in 1881 defeated the last major Mapuche uprising.

After the occupation of Lima was accomplished, Chilean newspapers published extremely patriotic, chauvinist and expansionistic material. An extreme example of this journalism is Revista del Sur that wrote that firearms obtained in Peru, while useless in the hands of Peruvian "fags" (Spanish: maricas), would be useful by Chileans to "kill indians" (Mapuches).

While Argentina had taken advantage of Chile's conflict to push for a favorable boundary in Patagonia, Chilean diplomacy only agreed to sign the Boundary Treaty of 1881 after the triumph at Lima showed Chile to be in a position of power. Thus, the Argentine plans to negotiate with a weakened and troubled Chile were partly forgone with Chile's display of military power in Peru.

== See also ==
- War of the Pacific
- Treaty of Ancón
