= Battle of Miraflores =

1881 battle during the War of the Pacific

- Part of the Lima campaign within the War of the Pacific
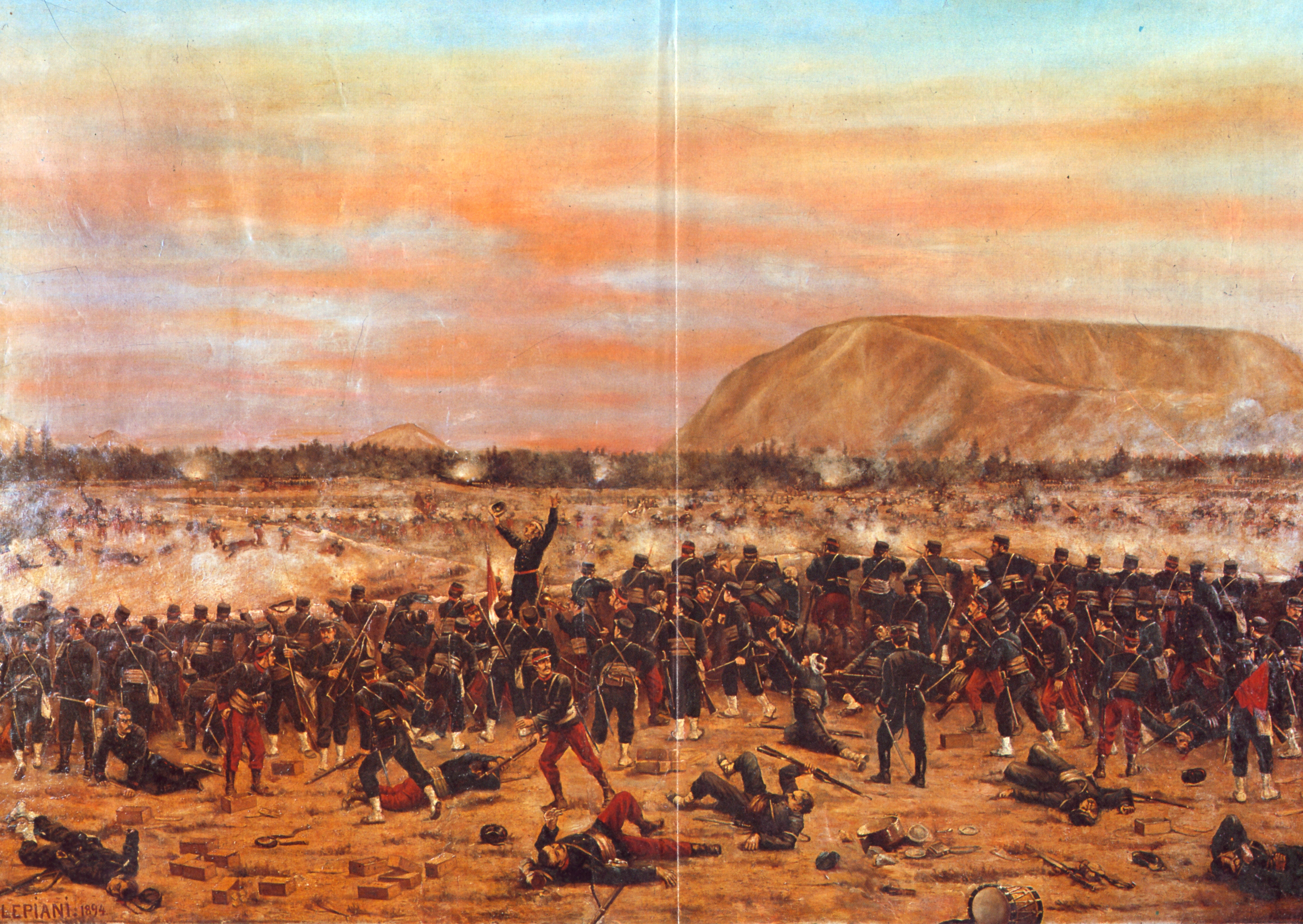
- Painting by Juan Lepiani
Date	15 January 1881
Location	Miraflores District, Peru
Result	Chilean victory

Belligerents
Chile	Peru

Commanders and leaders
(Chile) Manuel Baquedano	(Peru) Nicolás de Piérola (Peru) Andrés Avelino Cáceres (WIA)

Strength
10,000–13,000; 88 guns	10,500–11,000

Casualties and losses
502 killed 1,622 wounded	1,200 killed 2,000 wounded

The Battle of Miraflores occurred on January 15, 1881 in the Miraflores District of Lima, Peru. It was an important battle during the War of the Pacific that was fought between Chile and the forces of Peru. The Chilean army led by Gen. Manuel Baquedano defeated the army commanded by Nicolás de Piérola guarding the second defensive line of the Peruvian capital city. Two days later, Lima, the capital city of Peru was occupied by Chilean troops. Gen. Baquedano's forces marched into Lima triumphant, while Peru's president and his officers fled into the interior, leaving the country without any government. Even after the fall of Lima, the war continued between the occupation army and the troops of Andres Caceres for another three years. During the occupation of Lima, Peru's National Library was burned, while a number of other monuments were ransacked by Chilean forces and taken as war trophies.

During the battle, Peruvian naval officer Captain Juan Fanning became a national hero for leading a spectacular infantry charge of marines that nearly outflanked the enemy. Fanning's brigade caused many Chilean casualties before running out of ammunition, then continued to fight with knives and bayonets until Fanning was mortally wounded. Four hundred of Fanning's 524 men were killed during the charge.

== Prelude ==
After the Chilean victory at Chorrillos, a truce was declared between both sides while peace conversations took place. The Chilean objective was to obtain an unconditional capitulation and avoid another battle before entering Lima. To that end, General Baquedano held talks with Nicolás de Piérola and mediators Spencer St John of England, Jorge Tezanos Pinto of El Salvador and M. de Vorges of France. The failure of these peace talks led to the second battle for control of Lima.

=== Peruvian defenses ===
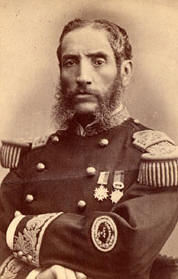
Gen. Andrés Cáceres

During the peace conversations, Pierola arranged his army on the second defensive line of Miraflores. The defenses were arranged in a similar way to those at Chorrillos two days earlier. A 12 km. line extended from the beach at Miraflores until Surco River, formed by 10 strongholds about 900 m apart.

This line was divided in three sectors:

- On the right flank, under the command of General Andrés Cáceres, Redoubt Nº 1 was defended by the 2nd Battalion commanded by the Provisional Colonel Lecca. Right next to this forces, the Guardia Chalaca Battalion, led by Carlos Arrieta, and the Guarnición de Marina Battalion commanded by Captain Juan Fanning. Right next to it, the 4th Battalion was posted in the Redoubt Nº 2, under the order of the Provisional Colonel Ribeyro, this stronghold was by the railroad. The Redoubt Nº 3 was defended by 6th Battalion commanded by Provisional Col. de la Colina.
- On the center of the line was Belisario Suárez' division.
- On the left was located the division commanded by Justo Pastor Dávila. The 8th battalion was set on Redoubt Nº 5. The 10th Battalion was at the Redoubt Nº 6. 12th Battalion on Redoubt Nº 7, 14th Battalion on the Camacho bridge, and on the right of this last unit, the 16th Battalion. In total, the Peruvian forces had 10,500 men between the regular army and the reserve.

=== The Chilean Forces ===
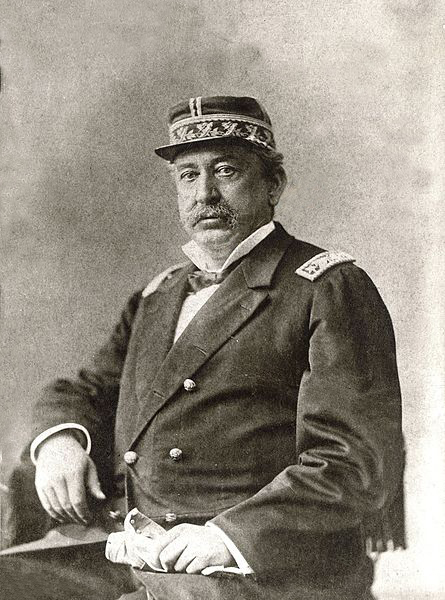
Gen. Pedro Lagos

The Army of Chile had a strength estimated about 12,000 men and was divided into three divisions and one reserve as it follows:

- I Division of Navy Capt. Patricio Lynch:
  - 1st Brigade of Col Juan Martínez formed by the 2nd Line, Talca, Atacama, Colchagua infantry regiments.
  - 2nd Brigade of Col. José Dgo. Amunátegui had the 4th Line, Chacabuco, Coquimbo, Artillería de Marina infantry regiments and the Quillota and Melipilla infantry battalions.
- II Division of Col. Emilio Sotomayor:
  - 1st Brigade of Col. José Fco. Gana, composed by the "Buin" 1st Line, Esmeralda and Chillán infantry regiments.
  - 2nd Brigade of Lt. Col. Orozimbo Barbosa was formed by the Lautaro and Curicó infantry regiments, and the Victoria Infantry Battalion.
- III Division of Col. Pedro Lagos:
  - 1st Brigade of Col. Martiniano Urriola, composed by the Aconcagua Inf. Regiment and the Naval Inf. Battalion.
  - 2nd Brigade of Col. Francisco Barceló formed by the Santiago and Concepción infantry regiments, plus the Valdivia, Bulnes and Caupolicán infantry battalions.
- The reserve, made of the 3rd Line, Valparaíso and Zapadores infantry regiments.
- The artillery brigade was made up of the 1st and 2nd regiments, all with their field guns. The cavalry had two regiments also, the Cazadores a Caballo and the Cazadores de Yungay.

=== First Movements ===
Because of a skirmish between a small groups of Chilean and Peruvian forces, in the night of January 14, Colonel Lagos ordered his Chief of Staff José Eustaquio Gorostiaga to send out a small force in order to scout the terrain at the south of Barranco. As a result, the III Division was placed on the south bank of Surco river. On the vanguard were deployed a company of the "Santiago" 5th Line Regiment and 40 soldiers of the Aconcagua Battalion and some artillery pieces, adding up 150 Chilean troops at the north of Barranco. Lagos' division was stationed in the vanguard because it hadn't had as many losses as the others at Chorrillos.

At this time, in the Peruvian lines, Gen. Pedro Silva made a formal review of his troops to raise the morale, which was very low due to the impact of the defeat at Chorrillos two days ago. This movement in the defensive lines made the Chilean officers become suspicious and they strengthened their advanced troops (at 400 meters of the Peruvian lines at the north bank of the Surco river). The Navales and 5th Line Regiment were deployed to the right and to the left of the railroad connecting Barranco and Miraflores. Now the Chilean vanguard was 1,100 men.

At 10:00 hrs, Martinez' reserve was ordered to move in direction to Barranco, and arrived at 11:00 to their destination.

At 10:45 hrs Gorostiaga, who was even more concerned about the vicinity of the Peruvian forces, persuaded Col. Lagos to put the whole division in formation.

After this, the I Division advanced to Barranco. Col. Martinez' brigade began to move at 13:00 hrs, but Col. Amunategui's brigade didn't advance until 14:00 hrs. Meanwhile, Gen. Baquedano ordered the cavalry to advance over Barranco. Lagos's division continued evolving on the vanguard setting its 2nd Brigade on the left flank. Its 1st brigade was not in position, because the troops were unaware of the tense situation, so Lagos urged to force the march and advance quickly to their positions alongside the Artillery Regt. Nº 1's 1st Brigade. All this movement took place in front of Cáceres' Corps.

== The battle ==
=== The beginning ===
Baquedano wanted to check out the troops situation, and moved dangerously close to the front line. Apparently, Peruvian soldiers fired upon Baquedano, and their shots were answered by the Chileans. In a short time, the cross fire became general, and the battle started unexpectedly at 14:00 hrs., catching both sides unprepared. However, the Chilean right was attacked by Cáceres' Corps. The Chilean battleships began to fire upon the Peruvians trying to ease the pressure. Cáceres saw the chance to destroy Lagos' division and sent the Guardia Chalaca and Guarnición de Marina battalions against Barceló, while a fraction of Col. Suárez' Corps engaged Urriola, who wasn't formed yet. The strength of the attack forced the Chileans to retreat. At this time, Lynch wasn't yet in position, so the cavalry and the artillery withdrew from the front line.

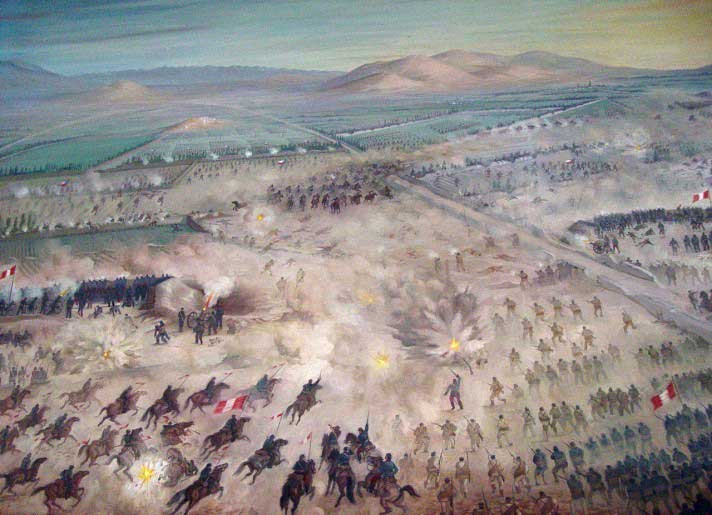
Battle of Miraflores

=== The Chilean Counterattack ===
At 15:00, the first troops of the I Division reinforced Lagos' right flank. Two battalions from the reserve reinforced Lagos as well, along with another two cavalry regiments. Cáceres increased the attack with the Concepción, Libertad and Paucarpata battalions, but they were stopped and began to refold again.

Lagos ordered the "Santiago" 5th Line Regiment to catch Cáceres in a pincer maneuver, while the rest of the brigade were to hit the Peruvians with a frontal charge. The "Santiago" performed the flanking attack, and three companies of the other units assaulted the trenches, but had to be reinforced with another five. The Chileans broke through and took Redoubt Nº 1, and Cáceres retreated to Redoubt Nº 2.

=== Breakthrough ===
When the whole of Lynch's division gathered and when Barbosa's brigade reinforced the left flank, the Peruvian offensive weakened. Barceló was wounded, and his brigade fell to Lt. Col. Demófilo Fuenzalida. Fuenzalida, backed up by soldiers from the 3rd Line Regiment, outflanked the position and onsetted the next four Peruvian redoubts in the I Sector (gunned with thirty cannons and ten machine guns) from behind and expelled its defenders, then advanced to Miraflores.

Although the Peruvian resistance on the right was fading, on the center the situation was quite different. Here the defenders held their positions a while longer, but began to cede when another two Chilean regiments arrived. When these redoubts were taken, the 8th Battalion in redoubt Nº 5 withdrew, collapsing the entire Peruvian front.

By 18:30, Fuenzalida arrived at Miraflores train station, while the cavalry regiments converged on his position. With the battle already decided, Echenique ordered the remaining troops not to enter in combat, dissolving his forces and sending them home, avoiding the combat to reach the capital's streets. Nevertheless, the positions at San Bartolomé and San Cristóbal continued firing at the Chileans a while longer. Like Chorrillos, Miraflores was burned to the ground. By midnight, Rufino Torrico, Mayor of Lima surrendered the city to Gen. Baquedano.

Finally, Lima had fallen after more than five hours of fierce combats and almost two years of war.

== Aftermath ==
=== Military and political consequences ===
The casualties in both sides were enormous. The Chilean army lost between 2,200 and 2,600 men, among them Juan Martínez, Commander of the Atacama Regiment. Lagos' III Division fought in the front line the entire battle, so had the biggest losses, 1,131 men were dead or wounded. The I Division lost 697 men, and the II Division 347 soldiers. The Chilean reserve suffered the loss of 346 men.

The Peruvian army had losses estimated in about 3,200 men (30.4% of their total force), but it's not been confirmed with official reports. After the battle, Lima surrendered and the Chilean army entered in the City of the Viceroys on January 17, 1881. Also, Nicolás de Piérola fled to the Andes, as many of his officers did. Among these officers was Col. Andres Caceres, who led the resistance in the mountains against the Chilean occupation. Another three years of war were necessary until the decisive Chilean victory at Huamachuco, in 1883.

== Bibliography ==
- Mellafe, Rafael. La Guerra del Pacífico en Imágenes, Relatos, Testimonios. Centro de Estudios Bicentenario, 2007.
- Machuca, Francisco. Las Cuatro Campañas de la Guerra del Pacífico. Santiago, 1928.
- Bulnes, Gonzalo. La Guerra del Pacífico. Editorial del Pacífico, 1955.
