= Battle of Tacna =

1880 battle in Peru

- Part of the War of the Pacific
- Battle of Tacna according to Diego Barros Arana's "Guerra del Pacifico"
Date	26 May 1880
Location	Alto de la Alianza, Tacna, Peru
Result	Chilean Army victory; Bolivian withdrawal from the conflict

Belligerents
Chile	Peru; Bolivia

Commanders and leaders
(Chile) Manuel Baquedano	(Bolivia) Narciso Campero

Strength
11,779–14,147; 37 guns 4 Gatling guns	8,930–12,000; 16 guns 7 Gatling guns

Casualties and losses
2,200 casualties	3,500–5,000 casualties

The Battle of Tacna, also known as the Battle of the Alto de la Alianza, was a battle that took place on May 26, 1880, at the plateau of the Alto de la Alianza, a hill a few miles north of the Peruvian city of Tacna. It effectively destroyed the Peru-Bolivian alliance against Chile, forged by a secret treaty signed in 1873. During the battle, the Chilean Northern Operations Army led by General Manuel Baquedano González conclusively defeated the combined armies of Peru and Bolivia commanded by Bolivian President, General Narciso Campero.

As a result of the battle, Bolivia was knocked out of the war, leaving Peru to fight the rest of the war alone. The victory also consolidated the Chilean domain over the Peruvian department of Tarapacá. Following the signing of the Treaty of Ancón on October 20, 1883, the war concluded and the territory was definitively annexed to Chile. Tacna itself remained under Chilean control until signing of the Treaty of Lima in 1929.

== Prologue ==
After their success in the Tarapacá campaign, the Chileans went quiet for some time. The Chilean government believed that with the capture of Tarapacá, Peru would sign a truce, allowing Chile to keep the recently gained territory as war compensation. Besides, the army had enlarged by mass civilian volunteers. By November, the Army of Northern Operations had 12,000 men. Finally, the control of Antofagasta meant an extra cash-flow from the saltpeter exports. This made it possible to purchase weapons, clothes, food and other war materials the expanding army would require, easing the burden of war expenditures.

But, the lack of results generated popular discontent in Peru and Bolivia. Especially in the latter, the retreat from Camarones was a shame. This was the determinant for the deposition of the President of Peru, Mariano Ignacio Prado, and his Bolivian counterpart, Hilarión Daza. Both were deposed and replaced by Nicolás de Piérola and General Narciso Campero, respectively. Also, the loss of the Tarapacá Department stopped the earnings of the saltpeter trade, making the war financial weight heavier for the Allies.

=== Allied Army ===
The Allies had 11,000 men between Tacna and Arica. The army present in Tacna had about 10,000 men and thirty one cannons — six Krupp breech-loading cannons, six Gatling machine guns, nine La Hitte 4kg muzzle-loading rifled cannons, and two Blakely 12pdr muzzle-loading rifled guns. Elements of the allied army had been stationed in the city for about a year, but had little experience of the dry conditions outside the valley where the city of Tacna lay. By the time of the battle the sanitary conditions in the city were poor with infectious diseases being widespread among both soldiers and the civilian population. Civilians and soldiers alike died of infectious diseases, hospitals were underfunded, and overall the management of the military effort poor. Many diseased soldiers went directly from the hospitals and houses, where they were resting, to the battlefield.

The main problem for the allies was that the infantry had different types of rifles, and many of them were obsolete, with no compatible ammunition. Being the highest-ranking officer, the command of the Allies fell to Gen. Narciso Campero, president of Bolivia.

=== Chilean Army ===
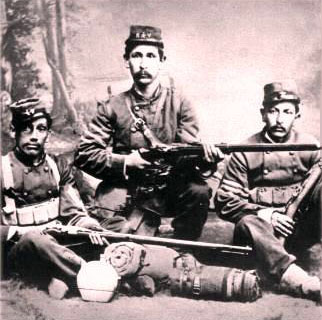
Chilean infantrymen

The Chilean High Command planned a landing at Ilo and Pacocha to scout the country and to gain knowledge of the Allies status. Following two previous incursions, 10,000 men were unshipped at Ilo. By the time of these events, Gen. Erasmo Escala resigned his commission as Commander in Chief due to constant arguments with War Minister Rafael Sotomayor. The latter appointed General Manuel Baquedano González as his successor. Baquedano was a veteran of the war against the Peru-Bolivian Confederacy, who had the sympathies and respect of the soldiers.

The infantry was equipped with Comblain and upgraded Gras rifles, which used the same type of bullets. The artillery had 37 cannon — 20 Krupp cannon and 17 mountain cannon.

=== Preliminary moves ===
On 31 December, a Chilean column under Lt. Col. Arístides Martínez disembarked at Ilo. The Chileans took control of the town and severed the telegraph lines to Moquegua. Afterwards, the expedition took the train to Moquegua, and seized the town the next morning. Then, Martínez returned to Ilo and sailed back to Pisagua on 2 January. After this reconnaissance, Sotomayor decided to attack Tacna and Arica with the whole army, and left Moquegua alone.

A massive landing took place between 18 and 25 February. In two echelons, four divisions disembarked at Ilo. On the 27, the Chilean Navy began the bombardment of Arica, where Huáscar's new captain Manuel Thomson, died in the Naval Battle of Arica.

On 8 March, another Chilean column of 900 soldiers under Colonel Orozimbo Barbosa was sent to Mollendo. Ten days later, Gen. Campero's arrived in Tacna and assumed control of the Allied Army. By the end of the month, the Peruvian stronghold of Los Angeles Hill, -a position considered unbreakable by the Allies- fell to Baquedano. On 9 April, the port of El Callao was placed under blockade. However, the Peruvian corvette Unión broke through the blockade on Arica, delivering supplies, medicines, and shoes to the port garrison.

On 20 May, Minister Rafael Sotomayor died of a stroke at Las Yaras. The Chilean President Aníbal Pinto appointed the former Lieutenant of the National Guard José Francisco Vergara as the new War Minister in Campaign.

Whilst the Chilean Army developed in the Tacna Department, the Allies had their own problems. Montero wanted to wait for the Chileans at Tacna, but Col. Eliodoro Camacho supported the idea to march and ambush them at the Sama river valley, easing the communications with Arequipa. Trying to avoid any confrontation, Gen. Campero traveled to Tacna to take charge, assuming his command on 19 April. On the night of 25 May, Campero's troops tried to ambush the Chileans at Quebrada Honda, but the darkness and the mist prevented the Allies from doing so, forcing their return to Tacna for defense preparations.

== The battle ==
=== Battlefield ===
The Intiorko plateau is an arid and soft-sloped terrain located a few miles north from Tacna, becoming an excellent shooting ground. It has on the rear of a series of small sand ridges that allowed the concealment of reserve units behind them. The flanks are protected by the Sama-Tacna road from the east, and to the west by an almost impossible to walk terrain, where no artillery could ever been placed, and a harsh field for infantry or cavalry movement.

=== Allied plan and distribution ===
The Allied plan relied on taking tactical advantage of the terrain; thus the strategy was to defend from a protected position. So, the army was set on the southern edge of the Intiorko plateau, deployed in a 3 km long defensive line. The troops neither prepared any defenses nor dug any trenches, apart from little sand defenses for the artillery on their right wing.

Campero divided his army into three major sectors:

- On the right, the front line had the Cuzco, Lima and Murillo battalions, plus the Peruvian del Solar's and IV divisions. In reserve were the Bolivian Alianza (also known as Colorados) and Aroma battalions. All were under the command of Lizardo Montero.
- Col. Manuel Castro Pinto had the center, and the Padilla, Chorolque, Grau and Loa battalions. The Peruvian V Division was on the rearguard.
- Finally, the left flank was commanded by Col. Eliodoro Camacho. Camacho had the Peruvian I and III divisions, and behind were the Peruvian IV Division and the Sucre, Viedma y Tarija battalions.

The Peruvian Second Army of the South and the Bolivian Army combined added up to twenty one battalions with eight machine guns and nine cannons, plus eight cavalry squadrons.

=== Chilean plan and troop deployment ===
The Chileans discussed battle plans for the battle. The first one was a flanking maneuver on the Allied right proposed by War Minister Vergara. On the other hand, Col. Velasquez had the idea to exploit the lack of depth in the allied lines, and to engage the whole front in a simultaneous charge. The idea was that the troops couldn't be moved from one point to another, avoiding that the weaker points generated during the battle could be reinforced. Besides, the lack of trenches and fortifications would make this breaking easier.

Baquedano inclined for Velasquez' plan. Thus, the infantry split into five divisions, as it follows:

- The I Division of Col. Santiago Amengual, with the Valparaíso and Navales battalions, plus the Esmeralda and Chillán regiments.
- Right next to the left was the II Division of Col. Francisco Barceló, made of the Atacama, 2nd Line and 5th Line regiments.
- Col. Orozimbo Barbosa's 4th Division had the Cazadores del Desierto Battalion plus the Lautaro and Zapadores regiments.
- Right behind them was Col. Jose Amunátegui's III Division, with the Artillería de Marina, Coquimbo and Chacabuco regiments.
- deployed on a third line, and behind these two was the reserve of Col. Mauricio Muñoz, with the "Buin" 1st Line, 3rd Line and 4th Line regiments

Velasquez' artillery had thirty-seven cannons and four machine guns, and the cavalry was composed of three regiments, with a fraction detached to the II Division and the rest with Baquedano's chief staff.

The Chilean army presented at Tacna a total of sixteen battalions, three cavalry regiments and thirty-seven cannons.

=== The beginning ===
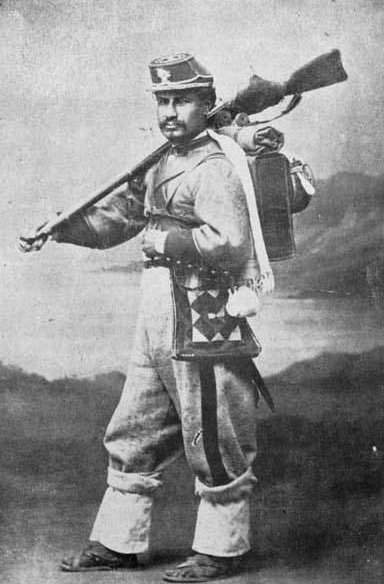
Bolivian Colorados Regt. soldier

The battle began with a useless artillery duel, because the projectiles buried in the sand and didn't explode. According to Velázquez' plan, around 10 am Amengual's division began the march over the Allied left, while Barceló moved to the center with his division in a single line, and Barbosa marched over Montero. Amengual engaged first, because Barceló was ordered to wait until the I Division could take the Allied left flank.

Amengual engaged Camacho on the far left of his position. Camacho sent in Col. Jacinto Mendoza's IV Division as well as the Sucre, Tarija and Viedma battalions. Also, General Campero sent the V Division of Col. Herrera to reinforce the Allied left, between Camacho and Castro Pinto.

After a bitter struggle, the Chileans drove back the Viedma and Victoria battalions, but couldn't break the allied left completely. Both sides engaged in a fierce fighting, firing upon each other no farther than 40 meters away. The Sucre Battalion lost 80% of its men, while Amengual continued his advance. Until now, only 4,500 soldiers had assaulted the Allied front. When Camacho saw his units retreating, he ordered his rearguard to fire upon the fugitives. Also, he asked for reinforcements, and Montero's reserve was sent in his help.

=== The Allies counter-attack ===
By 12:30 am, the Chileans had depleted their ammunition and the attack faded. The Allies saw the opportunity and a general charge was ordered. All of Castro Pinto's infantry attacked Barceló, while the Peruvian II and III divisions along with the Aroma and Alianza battalions attacked Amengual. With almost no bullets, the Chileans had to fall back with several casualties. The Atacama Regiment alone lost almost half of its personnel.

The commander of the Esmeralda Regiment, Lt. Col. Adolfo Holley asked for the cavalry to intervene. Also, Baquedano sent Amunátegui's III Division to reinforce the vanguard, and moved the artillery forward.

=== Chilean breakthrough ===
Vergara ordered Yávar's Granaderos a Caballo Regiment to charge. Two squadrons rode to the far left of the battlefield to engage Murguía's Alianza Battalion, who had captured a few cannons. Murguía received the cavalry in squared formations and with well performed rifle volleys drove it off. However, the charge forced the allied advance to stop, which gave Amengual and Barceló precious time to rally and to resupply. Just when Yávar retreated, Amunátegui arrived. On the far left, Amengual's men and the “Artillería de Marina” Regiment caught the Bolivians in a heavy cross fire, and after intense fighting, tore them to pieces. The rest of Amunátegui's and Barceló's divisions regained the terrain previously lost, and finally broke the allied center. Now the tide was firmly in Chile's favor.

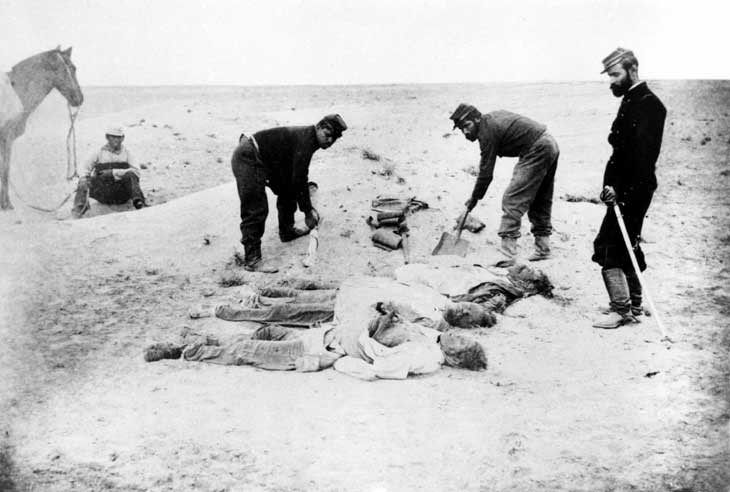
Burying soldiers after the battle

=== Ending ===
Meanwhile, the Chileans attacked the allied left and center, Barbosa's IV Division attacked Lizardo Montero on the right. The Zapadores and Lautaro regiments advanced frontally over Montero, while the Cazadores del Desierto Battalion maneuvered to outflank from the far right. The constant sending of troops to help Camacho left Montero only with the Peruvian VI Division and Del Solar's Division and some artillery to defend his position. The Chileans advanced in guerrilla formation, and the Cazadores del Desierto Battalion outflanked the position. Finally, Barbosa's men bayonetted off the artillery defenders. Also, the remains of the Atacama Regiment with some troops from the 5th Line Regiment penetrated the allied lines and also attacked the right from the rearguard. Montero had no choice to fall back and the defensive front collapsed.

After 5 hours of heavy fighting, the Allies left the battlefield. While the Allies retreated to Tacna, Amengual chased them until reaching the city. Later, Tacna was shelled in order to force the surrender, and finally Col. Santiago Amengual entered into the city around 18:30.

== Aftermath ==
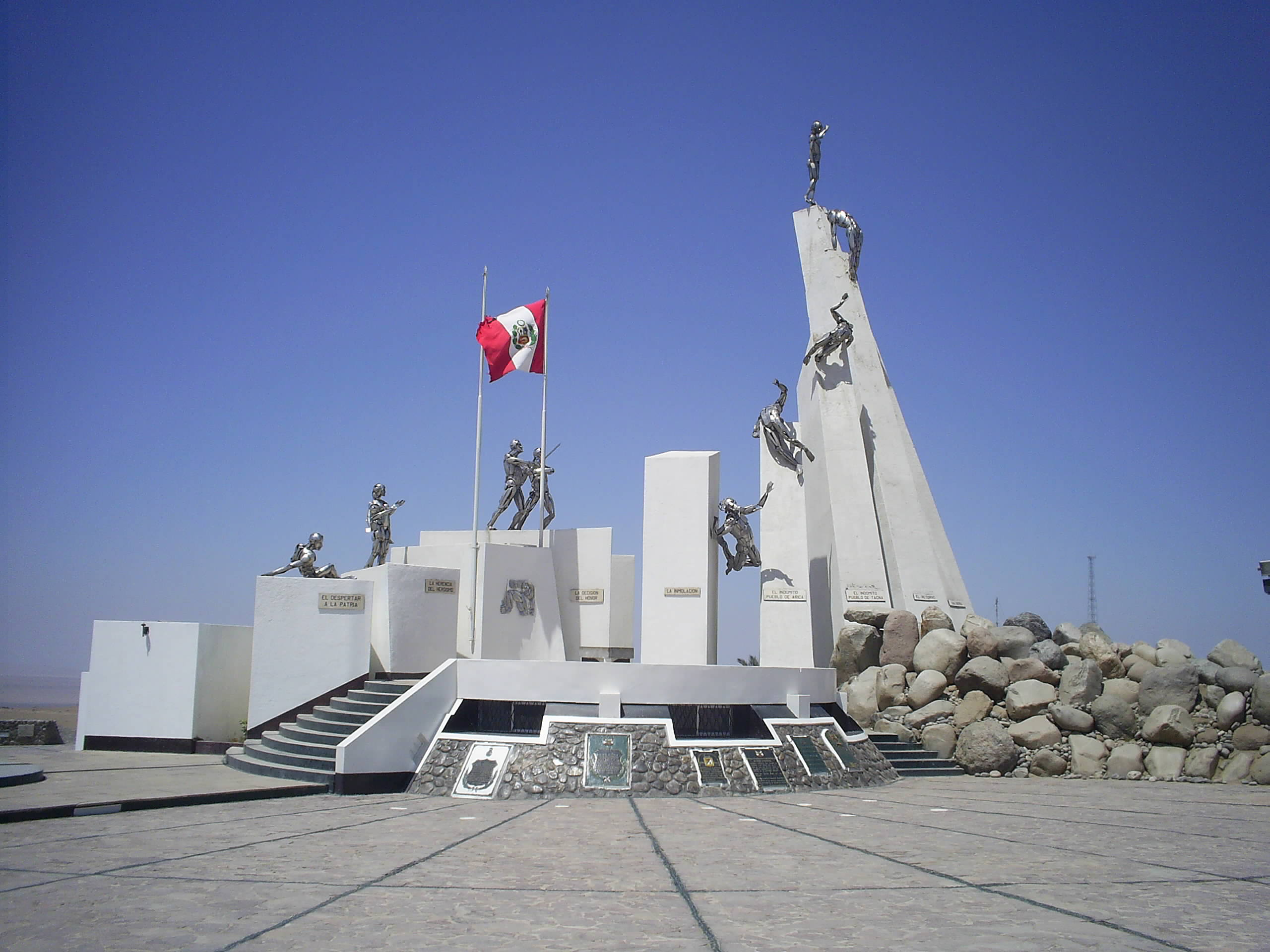
Battle of Tacna monument

The Chilean Army had 2,200 casualties. Amengual's, Barceló's and Amunátegui's divisions, which added up 6,500 men, had 1,639 dead and wounded. Barbosa's division lost 15% of its force. The Chilean reserve almost did not fight, having only 17 wounded. The Atacama and Santiago regiments lost almost 50% of their effective force. Also the 2nd Line, Navales and Valparaíso regiments had severe losses. The 2nd Line Regiment banner lost at the battle of Tarapacá was found on a church in Tacna by Ruperto Marchant Pereira.

The Allies had casualties estimated between 3,500 and 5,000 men. The Bolivian Army lost 23 officers, from major to general. The "Colorados" Battalion had only 293 survivors, while the Aroma Battalion — also known as "Amarillo" – lost 388 soldiers, since these units chose to fight to the end instead of retreating. The Peruvian army lost 185 officers, and more than 3,000 soldiers died. According to a communication of Solar to Piérola, only 400 Peruvian men escaped from the battle.

=== Military and political results ===
The defeat had a decisive impact upon the Allies. Gen. Campero withdrew to Bolivia, taking the road to Palca, meanwhile Montero retired to Puno, passing through Tarata.

This battle was a turning point in the war. In the first place, Bolivia was knocked out of the war, forcing Bolivia to accept its complete defeat. Peru had to fight the rest of the war alone. Second, the Chilean government changed the objective of the conflict, because it became clear that the war would end only with the complete surrender of Peru.

== See also ==
- Order of Battle at Tacna

== Bibliography ==
- Bulnes, Gonzalo (1911). La Guerra del Pacífico 1879 - 1884. Editorial del Pacífico.
- Mellafe, Rafael; Pelayo, Mauricio (2004). La Guerra del Pacífico en imágenes, relatos... testimonios. Centro de Estudios Bicentenario.
- Ejército de Chile. "Batalla de Tacna". Archived from the original on 4 January 2009.
- Museo Histórico Militar de Chile. "Batalla de Tacna o del Alto de la Alianza". Archived from the original on 13 February 2012.
- Harvard College Library. "La Batalla de Tacna".
