= Sofanor Parra =

Chilean military officer (1850–1925)

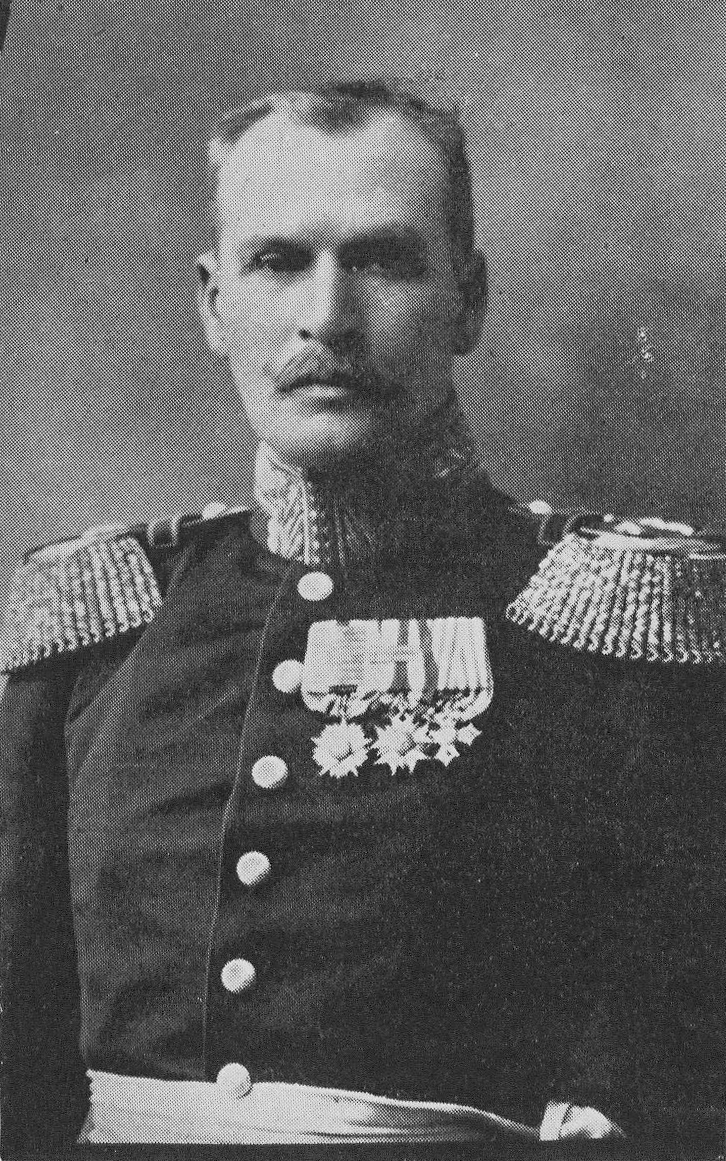
- Photograph of Sofanor Parra, date unknown
- Born: 20 October 1850; San Carlos, Chile
- Died: 2 November 1925 (aged 75); Santiago, Chile
- Military career
- Allegiance: Chile
- Branch: Chilean Army
- Service years: 1869–1892, 1896–1916
- Rank: Divisional general
- Nickname: Immortal
- Units: Regiment Cazadores a Caballo; Regiment Granaderos a Caballo
- Commands: List: Chief of Staff in the Cañete Division of the Chilean Army of occupation (1881); Commander of the Regiment Granaderos a Caballo; Commander of the Regiment Cazadores a Caballo (1896); General Cavalry Inspector; Commander of the IV Division; Commander of the II Division (1908); General Commander of Arms of Tarapacá (1912)
- Conflicts: Occupation of Araucanía; War of the Pacific
- Awards: Medals of the campaign and the battles of War of the Pacific; Royal Star of the Order of the Crown (German Empire)

Sofanor Parra Hermosilla (20 October 1850 – 2 November 1925), was a Chilean military officer who served in the Chilean Army, in the cavalry branch, and who reached the rank of divisional general.

He is known for having been in all the land campaigns of the War of the Pacific, participating in several military actions, as part of the Regiment Cazadores a Caballo, with which he gained great prestige in the Chilean Army.

== Family ==
He was the son of José Luis Parra Sepúlveda and Narcisa Hermosilla y Godoy. He had four brothers: Abdón, Felisario, Abelardo and Matilde. Sofanor Parra married Clarisa Mujica Mardones at some point in his life.

== Early life ==
Parra was born in the town of San Carlos, on 20 October 1850. His childhood was spent in the father's field, in the Ñuble River area, where he became accustomed to the use of the horse. As his family was of high social class, he received a good education at the Lyceum and at the Conciliar Seminary of Concepción.

On 1 April 1867, when he had just turned sixteen, he entered as a cadet at the Military Academy of Santiago, with Colonel La Fuente being the head of the military establishment.

== Military career ==
=== First years ===
In May 1869 he graduated from the military academy with the rank of ensign of cavalry and entered the Chilean Army, forming part of the Regiment Cazadores a Caballo. As an officer of that cavalry regiment, he participated in the military campaigns of the Occupation of Araucanía, between 1872 and 1874. He operated on the Malleco River line, under the command of Colonel Gregorio Urrutia. During this period he was promoted to second lieutenant and then lieutenant in 1875.

=== War of the Pacific ===
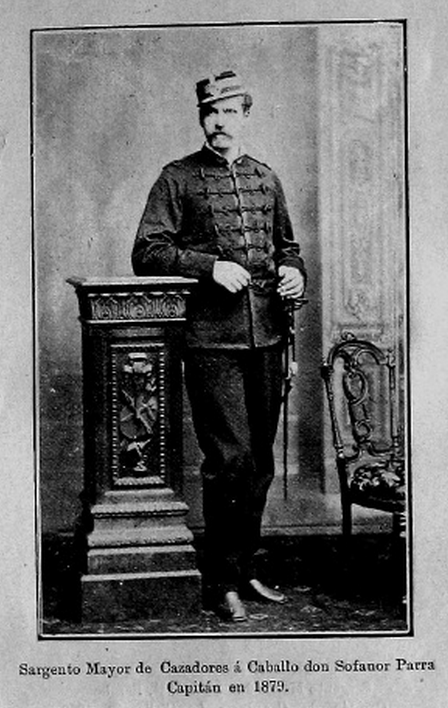
Sofanor Parra during the War of the Pacific

When hostilities against Peru and Bolivia began in early 1879, Parra moved north with his cavalry regiment. In this war, he would participate in almost all land military actions, which earned him the nickname "Immortal".

His first military action in the north was at the Battle of Calama in March, where he commanded a section of his regiment. During the naval campaign, he was present in the bombardment of Antofagasta by the Peruvian ironclad Húascar.

In 2 November he was at the Battle of Pisagua, the military action with which the Campaign of Tarapacá began. In that same month, already as captain, he participated in the reconnaissance of an area with two companies of Cazadores a Caballo, which he had under his command with a captain named Baharona, but both under the command of Lieutenant Colonel José Francisco Vergara. During reconnaissance, he fought a fierce cavalry battle, in which they defeated a Peruvian-Bolivian cavalry force at Pampa Germania. Later, he was present in the Battle of San Francisco.

Between 1880 and 1881 he participated in the Campaign of Tacna–Arica and the Campaign of Lima, under General Manuel Baquedano. In the first campaign he was present in military actions such as the Battle of Los Ángeles, Battle of Pajonales de Sama, in the military operations in the Locumba valley, Battle of Tacna, Battle of Arica and in Tarata against the montoneras of the Peruvian Leoncio Prado. In the second campaign, he was in the Battle of Chorrillos and in the Battle of Miraflores, engagements that allowed the Chilean occupation of Lima in 1881.

After the occupation of Lima, Parra did not return with the first Chilean troops that returned to Chile, but remained in Peru with his cavalry regiment. On 23 February, he was promoted on merit to sergeant major, at the age of thirty. At that time Parra enjoyed great prestige, being considered one of the best in the army's cavalry branch, for having distinguished himself and risked in several of the aforementioned engagements.

He showed off his sabre from Calama to Huamachuco.

— General Manuel Baquedano

He then participated in the Campaign of Sierra, from 1881 to 1883. For his distinguished services, he served on various commissions in central and northern Peru, being appointed Chief of Staff in the Cañete Division of the Chilean Army of occupation in 1881. In that same year he was part of the expedition to Junín, under Commander Ambrosio Letelier. In 1883, he participated in military operations in the Sierra to defeat the elusive Peruvian general Andrés Avelino Cáceres, who was still resisting the Chilean occupation. In July, Parra was in the decisive Battle of Huamachuco against this Peruvian leader, being the second commander of the Regiment Cazadores a Caballo present at the battle. He led the charge of his cavalry squadron against the adversary in that battle, in the final attack of the Chilean forces, at the most critical moment, which decided the Chilean victory.

After this last campaign, which concluded the War of the Pacific with a Chilean victory, he returned to Chile. In 1885, he received several military medals for his merits in war.

=== Post-war period ===
Upon his return to Chile, Chilean President Domingo Santa María appointed him his personal assistant. In 1885, Parra was also promoted to lieutenant colonel and appointed second commander of the Regiment Granaderos a Caballo, although he was later appointed commander of the regiment.

When the Chilean civil war broke out in 1891, he abstained from participating in any of the fighting sides. Although, the reprisals of the victors of the war forced him to retire from the army in May 1892. But then he served as an instructor of the Militia Regiment Death Hussars, which was organized by a Chilean citizen, Enrique Allende Ríos, when the war between Chile and Argentina seemed imminent in that period.

In 1896, after three years retired from the army, he was reinstated and appointed commander of the Cazadores a Caballo, a cavalry regiment with which he had previously distinguished himself during the War of the Pacific. In his ranks, he would also be promoted to colonel.

=== Military attaché in Germany ===
In 1900, in recognition of his merits, Parra was sent to Germany as a military attaché. He remained attached to the renowned Cavalry Regiment Uhlans and later to the Hanoverian Cavalry Practical Military School. His good performance in that country gave prestige to the Chilean Army, and he received from the hands of Wilhelm II, German Emperor, the Royal Star of the Order of the Crown.

=== Last commissions and retirement ===
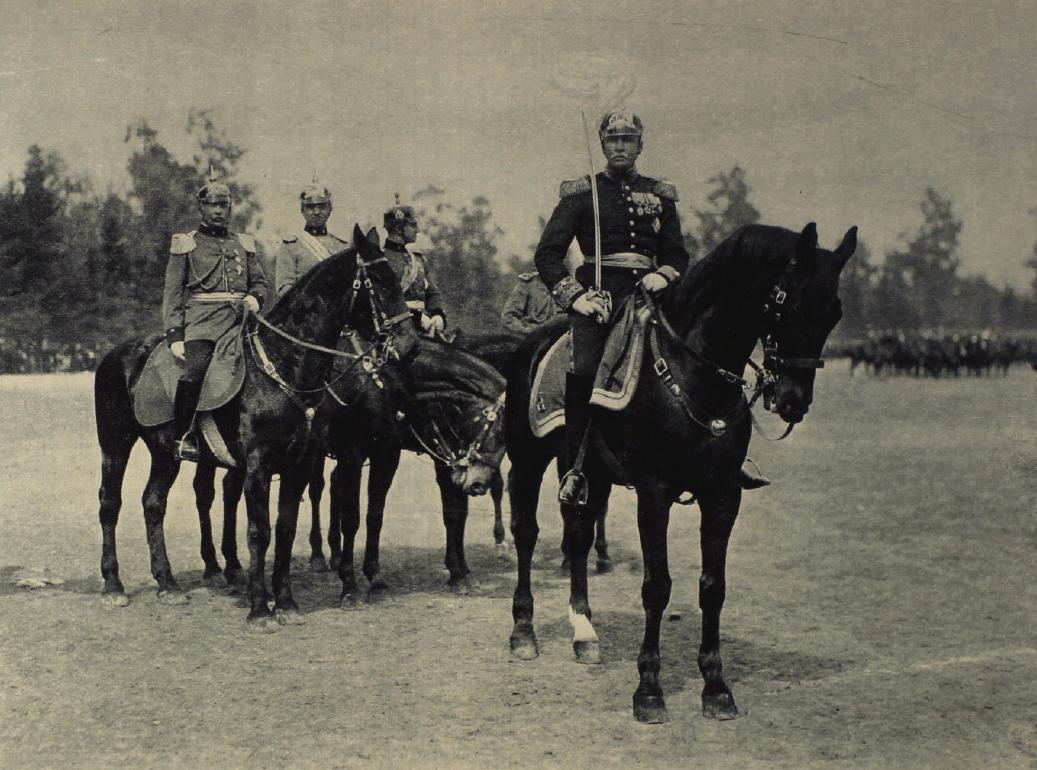
General Sofanor Parra leading the Great Military Parade of 1910

Upon returning to Chile, Parra held various positions in the high command of the Chilean Army, such as Inspector General of the Cavalry and commander of the Army's IV Division. In June 1908 he was promoted to brigadier general and assumed command of the Army's II Division.

In 1910, he led the Great Military Parade for the centenary of Chile's independence. In 1912, he reached the highest military rank of his career, that of divisional general. With that rank he held the General Command of Arms of Tarapacá.

On 16 November 1916, he was granted absolute retirement from the Chilean Army, when he completed sixty-six years and almost fifty years of service in the army.

== Last years ==
After his retirement, Parra continued with his practice of horseback riding every day, passing with his black horse through Gálvez de Santiago street in the direction of Cousiño Park. In that place he practiced equitation and entertained himself by watching the training of the soldiers of the Infantry Regiment Talca. In the streets of Santiago, he became popular for his walks on the sidewalks or the Alameda, drawing attention with his civilian frock coat and his robust physical figure.

On the morning of 1 November 1925, preparing for his usual horseback ride, he felt a severe pain in his chest that forced him to rest in his bed. The next day, on the anniversary of the Battle of Pisagua, he died.

== Posthumous recognitions ==
His funeral had public notoriety in Santiago, and his coffin was accompanied to his burial place by the cavalry regiment in which he gained his prestige, the Cazadores a Caballo.

At present there are streets and passages of some cities in Chile, such as Santiago, that bear his name. In Pozo Almonte there is a monolith as a reminder of its history. In San Carlos, his hometown, there is a school that bears his name as a tribute. On 18 October 2018, the first act in homage to Sofanor Parra was held in San Carlos, organized by the school that bears his name, and which had the participation of the Infantry Regiment N.º 9 Chillán.

== Sources ==
- Estado Mayor General del Ejército (1987). Galería de hombres de armas de Chile: Período de la influencia francesa, 1826-1885 (in Spanish). Vol. II. Santiago, Chile: Colección Biblioteca Militar.
- The Hispanic Society of America (1920). Belmont Parker, William (ed.). Chileans of to-day. New York, London; Santiago de Chile: G. P. Putnam's Sons; Imprenta Universitaria.
- Figueroa, Pedro Pablo (1897). Diccionario biográfico de Chile (in Spanish). Vol. II. Santiago, Chile: Imprenta y Encuadernación Barcelona.
