= Great Military Parade of Chile =

Military Ceremony in Chile

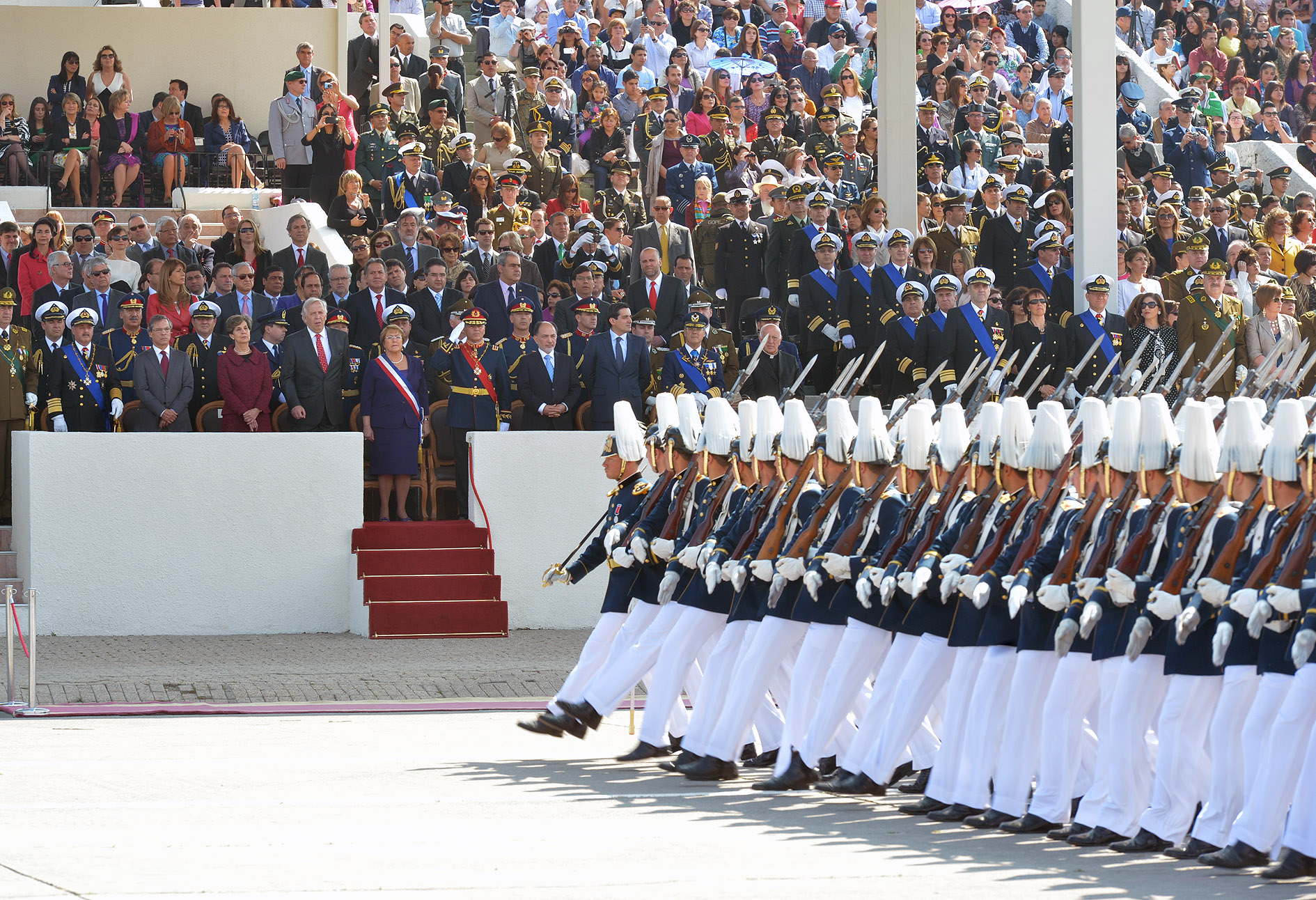

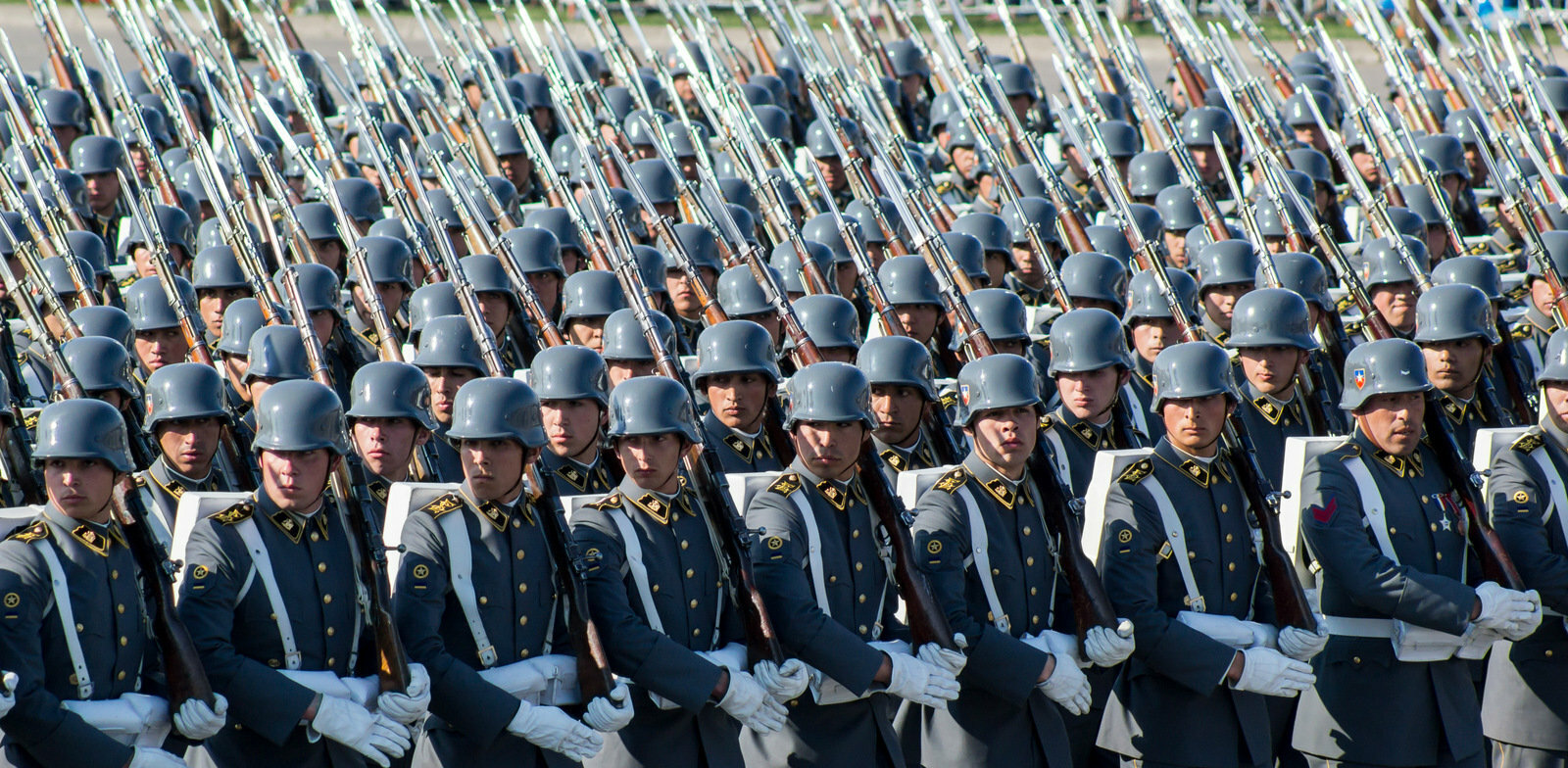
The parade in 2014.

For more than a century the Military Parade of Chile or Great Military Parade of Chile (Spanish: Gran Parada Militar de Chile or Parada Militar de Chile) has been a tradition within the Independence Day holidays in Chile. It is held in Santiago, Chile's O'Higgins Park on September 19 yearly in honor of the Glories of the Chilean Army with a military parade involving not just the ground forces but by the rest of the Chilean Armed Forces: the Chilean Navy, the Chilean Air Force, and the Carabineros de Chile. It is also in honor of the anniversary of the formal inauguration on that day in 1810 of the First Government Junta, which witnessed the first military parade of the independent nation at the Plaza de Armas, Santiago. It is the final act of the national independence celebrations, which are broadcast through TV and the Internet and radio.

Per Law 2977 of 1915, Army Day is celebrated on the 19th of September in honor of the Army's role in the defense of the Chilean nation, thus the date is dedicated to the Chilean Army and is a national holiday. The parade, however, dates back to 1896, and parades have been held annually in the capital beginning in 1819.

== Brief history ==
During the long Spanish era in Chile, whenever a new governor-general took office in Santiago, a military parade was called by the troops of the city garrison under the Spanish Army.

On September 19, 1810, the formal inauguration of the First Government Junta took place in Santiago which saw the first ever military parade of the new nation.

Another military parade was held on September 28, 1819, in honor of the formal victory in the Chilean War of Independence with units of the Army of the Andes taking part. The parade would move to its present home in 1830 under President José Tomás Ovalle, albeit in the fields of La Pampilla in the Santiago area, where the parade was held with the ceremonies ending in the Plaza de Armas with a Feu de joie. The parades, nicknamed "despejes" by the people, would take a new form in the years ahead.

In 1831, a military exercise was ordered by the government of President Joaquin Prieto on the Pampilla fields, which would witness the first ever parade on September 19 in the following year with Diego Portales taking the salute. The Pampilla area became its permanent home in 1842 when President Manuel Bulnes acquired lands in the area for the annual parades and military exercises, and was transformed into a military installation in 1845. It was turned into the O'Higgins Park (then the Cousiño Park) in 1873, thanks to the efforts of Luis Cousiño, who, inspired by the parks he had seen in Europe before, decided that he would help adapt it to the Chilean situation. He asked Manuel Arana to design it, who then added a Field of Mars to the design of the park for the annual military parades, and it has been held there ever since. Another big parade was held in 1884 as the War of the Pacific was then in its final months as the Army pushed on its final offensive.

The present-day parade, in the Prussian manner, officially began on September 19, 1896, even through in the late 1880s the parades held at the Field of Mars at O'Higgins Park, thanks to the efforts of the Prussian military mission to Chile under Captain Emil Körner, showed signs of Prussianization and modernization little by little. With the victory in the Chilean Civil War, in which Körner and the pro-modernization officers supported the Congress, the Prussian practice began to be standardized. The parade of 1896 witnessed Chilean Army units parading in the German manner, per companies and troops at first, and later by battalions and squadrons. Two years later, as the German-trained artillery and cavalry made their walk, trot and gallop passes at the tribune one pass at a time, the goose step made its debut in the parade, with the Army NCO School being the first to adopt the practice that would later be the Chilean Army standard by the 1901 parade, which was also the first since conscription was formally introduced. The parade of 1902 was the first in which foreign contingents marched past; in celebration of the recently signed Pacts of May, representatives from the Armed Forces of the Argentine Republic marched past at the tribune at the parade field for the first time. Despite the tragedies that happened in 1910 as the nation celebrated its centennial year, the parade that year went on as planned, with Emiliano Figueroa, then acting president, receiving the salute from the units of the army and the navy, in his first parade as chief executive.

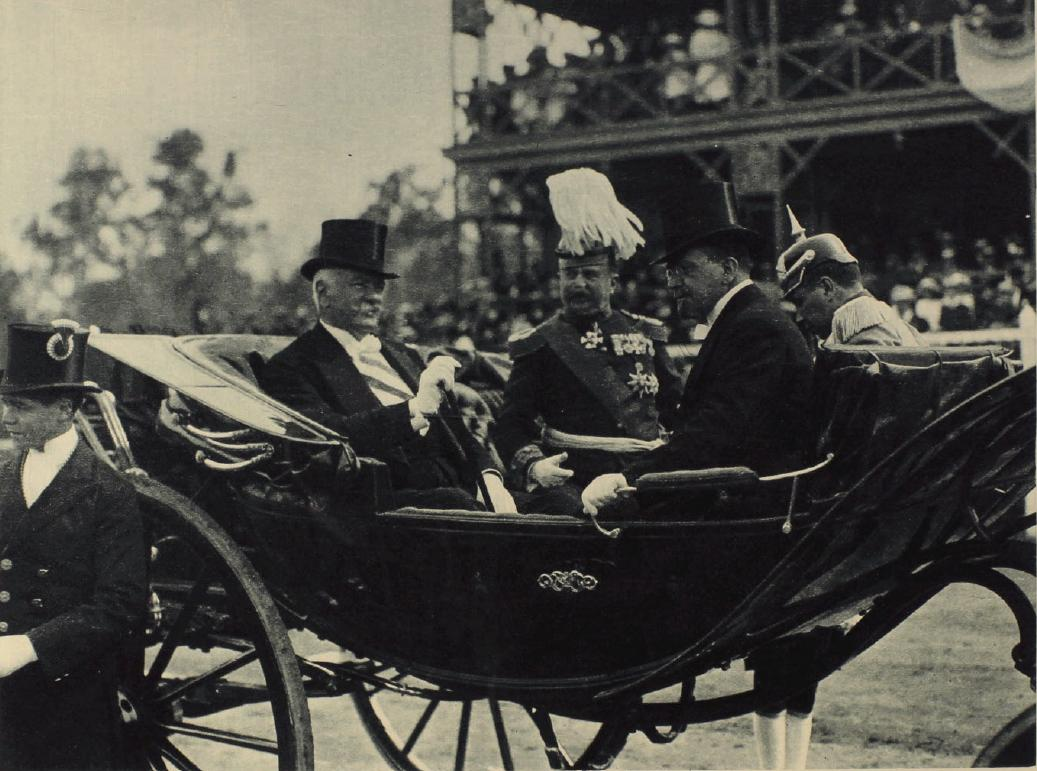
Juan Luis Sanfuentes at Dia de las Glorias del Ejercito in 1916

The parade's September 19 date was officially sanctioned in 1915 as Chilean Army Day (Dia de las Glorias del Ejercito) per a presidential decree by President Ramón Barros Luco and Interior and Public Security Minister Pedro Nicolás Montenegro, then confirmed by Law 2977 by the National Congress, celebrating the Army, the first full day of the full independent nation, and the 1810 inauguration of its first government. Barros Luco took the salute on that year's parade, the first since it was made official. It has remained the same ever since, with the latter additions of the Air Force and the Carabineros de Chile in the following years, and evolving with the changing times despite having cancelled twice in 1924 and 1973 and having been reduced to remote broadcasts in 2020 due to the COVID-19 pandemic (the parade of 1932 was held on September 17 for the only time in its history).

== Timeline of parades since 1925 ==
- 1925
  - Parade held after a one-year break, celebrated the 1925 Constitution, Luis Barros Borgoño's last parade as President, preceded by a September 10 parade in honor of the visit to the country of the Prince of Wales
- 1926
  - President Emiliano Figueroa's 2nd and last parade as President, the last parade of the Carabineros as a part of the Army
- 1927
  - Carlos Ibáñez del Campo took the salute on his first parade as President
- 1929
  - First aviation flypast
- 1931
  - Chilean Navy contingent reduced due to the sailors rebellion weeks before, Manuel Trucco Franzani's only parade as President
- 1933
  - Arturo Alessandri Palma's 4th parade as President
- 1936
  - Horse Rifles Regiment Mounted Band makes debut appearance with the unique regimental drumhorse
- 1939
  - Pedro Aguirre Cerda's first parade as President
- 1942
  - President Juan Antonio Ríos takes the salute on his first parade
- 1943
  - Air Force Academy makes debut appearance
- 1944
  - Air Force NCO School makes debut appearance
- 1962
  - Parade first broadcast on television
- 1968
  - Reorganized Army NCO School, with its Dragoneantes en Desfile (NCO Cadets on Parade) March, returns to the parade grounds months after its reopening, Naval Polytechnical Academy (then the Naval Specialties Schools System) makes debut marchpast
- 1970
  - First parade without the horse artillery columns
- 1971
  - Helicopter segment of flypast makes formal debut
- 1974
  - Augusto Pinochet takes the salute at his first parade as President
  - Carabineros contingents from NCO School and the Women's Police Corps march past for the first time
- 1975
  - Los Viejos Estandartes, the Chilean Army Hymn, played as the official march for the 1st time
- 1978
  - Parade broadcast for the first time in color on television in the midst of the Beagle conflict, 2nd Motorized Division regiments marched past
- 1980
  - Carabineros Basic Training School makes premiere march past
  - Debut appearance of the M50 and M60 Super Sherman medium tank
- 1981
  - Regimentsgruss Marsch adopted by the Air Force Academy, which also converts to white uniforms and cavalry sabres, and the ENAER T-35 Pillán makes debut flypast
  - Mounted column makes final appearance
- 1982
  - No mobile column and flypast appearance that year
  - Air Force NCO School drops the bugles on the Corps of Drums after their parade that year
- 1985
  - Landgraf Marsch adopted as the official march past of the Army NCO School
- 1986
  - Parademarsch der langen Kerls adopted as the official march past of the Carabinier School
- 1988
  - M24 Chaffee light tanks make final drivepast in the capital
- 1989
  - Augusto Pinochet takes the salute for one final time as President in a 3 hour long parade which sees the national debut of the locally manufactured FAMAE MOWAG Piranha APC
- 1991
  - Return of mobile column after one year break as reduced formation
- 1992
  - The Air Force Academy converts to blue uniforms
  - Ship detachments from Chilean Navy vessels and naval bases march past
  - Return of armored segment of mobile column after two years
- 1993
  - See the conquering hero comes readopted as official march past by the Air Force Academy, bugles now reinstated in regimental cadet band
- 1994
  - Only time ever in parade Army segment command and staff drove past
  - Final drivepast of the EE-11 Urutu APC
- 1995
  - Naval Polytechnical Academy makes first official march past within months after its formal renaming, Massed Naval Bands contingent return after an 8-year break
  - Final drivepast of Super Sherman medium tanks as part of mobile column
- 1996
  - Bernaro O'Higgins Military Academy debuts first women cadets on parade
- 1997
  - Contingents from Argentina, Brazil, Colombia, Ecuador, Peru and Uruguay marched
  - Sole drivepast of the nationally produced Rayo MRL
  - Final marchpast of the Army Women's Military School and army parachute battalions
- 1998
  - Army Communications School makes debut march past
  - The Army Special Forces School marches past for the first time singing the Chilean Army Hymn
- 1999
  - Final drivepast of the EE-9 Cascavel APC
  - Mounted column and mounted band segment reinstated
- 2000
  - Leopard 1 makes second and final drive past and horse artillery segment reintroduced
  - March past of first women cadets of the Air Force Academy
  - Chacabuco Regiment Historical Company makes first ever march past
  - First ever parade of National Service Cadets battalions of Chilean Army educational institutions
- 2001
  - Air Force NCO School reconverts to the dark blue uniforms, band stops use of the cavalry fanfare trumpet
  - Color guard column and mobile column both make their final appearances
- 2002
  - Air Force NCO School Band reconverts to bugles
  - Los Viejos Estandartes, the Chilean Army Hymn, played as the official march for the 1st time since the parade of 1994
  - 2nd Engineers Regiment, on its final parade, and the 3rd Mountain Detachment on its first parade following the merger of the 3rd and 18th Infantry Regiments, marches past with the first mountain infantrywomen
- 2003
  - Mounted Band of the First Cavalry (Horse Guards) Regiment "Grenadiers" begins using the present two drum horses format
  - First women's intake of Buin Regiment marches past for the first time
- 2004
  - UN peacekeepers sing the Army Hymn for the only time
- 2005
  - Guardia di Finanza cadets marched after Carabineros Academy contingent
- 2006
  - Michelle Bachelet, the first woman President of Chile, takes her first salute, together with the first ever lady Minister of National Defense, Vivianne Blanlot
- 2007
  - Army Services School makes debut march past, 1st parade for foreign cadets and NCO students of the Carabineros, Army segment command uses combat dress for the first time, the Royal 22e Régiment Band from the Canadian Army marched, Preußens Gloria is played by 1st Cavalry Regiment band during the end of parade
- 2008
  - Debut marchpast for the Carabiniers K-9 Training School
- 2009
  - Carabineros mounted contingents make their national debut, Army divisions nationwide featured for the 1st time
  - 1st march past of the Marine Corps in combat uniforms
- 2010
  - Sebastián Piñera takes the salute as President at his first parade, 200 national flags take their march past in celebration of 200 years of nationhood, contingents from Argentina, Bolivia, Brazil, Ecuador, United States, Mexico, Peru, Uruguay are also marched
  - Leopard 2 MBTs make national debut drivepast
- 2011
  - Dragonantes on Parade March readopted as parade marchpast of the Army NCO School which marches past the entire regiment of NCO cadets for the first time (3 battalions each)
- 2012
  - Military bands from Argentina, Brazil, Ecuador and France marched, horse artillery segment and 1st Armored Cavalry Regiment switched to Prussian styled uniforms
- 2014
  - The Army Special Forces School marches past for the first time since 2002 singing the Chilean Army Hymn
- 2015
  - Mountain mules appear in marchpast of 3rd Mountain Division for the first time in years
- 2016
  - Horse artillery segment marched within Army historical segments
  - Army Reserve unit marches past for the first time
- 2017
  - Military bands from Argentina, Columbia and Mexico marched, Landgraf Marsch played as march past of the UN Peacekeeping Force for Haiti, many Army segments wears sunglasses with new modern digital battledress uniforms
- 2018
  - First woman drum major for the Corps of Drums of the Carabineros NCO School
  - "Preußischer Präsentiermarsch" is played by the band of the First Cavalry Regiment during the end of parade mounted column
  - Army War College marches past for the first time featuring first women graduates of staff officer course
  - Live coverage was refused by Canal 13 due to charges made by TVN Chile.
- 2019
  - Chilean Investigations Police makes debut marchpast as part of Carabineros Academy contingent, whose Corps of Drums debuts first women drummers and buglers
  - Landgraf Marsch returns as marchpast of Army NCO School, Army Infantry marches past to Mi Fusil y Yo (Infantry School) and Adios al Septimo de Linea (2nd Motorized Division)
  - Air Force Reserve officers march past for the first time
  - Order of march of Carabineros units reversed, with the Training School marching out last
- 2021
  - Reduced parade returns after a one year break

== Expanded summary ==
The President of Chile, in his/her constitutional duty as Supreme Commander of the Armed Forces, is the principal guest of the national parade which is held every 19 September for over a century, not just as the principal parade celebrating the anniversary of Chilean independence, but also in recognition of the valuable contribution of the Army and the entire Armed Forces and Carabineros in defending the territorial integrity and ensuring the public security of the country. The parade is often held in the mid-afternoon hours, justified as many Chileans in the capital go out during the afternoon of the holiday period to celebrate with loved ones and friends at the O'Higgins Park where the parade has been held. At the stands fronting the Movistar Arena are members of the public, veterans of the armed forces and Carabineros, and families of the active duty personnel attending. Another stand at the north of the arena accommodates the public as well. At the central grandstand are representatives of the armed forces and Carabineros, military attaches to the republic and the diplomatic corps, guest military officers from NATO countries and from countries that also served with Chile in UN peacekeeping operations, the president of the Senate and Speaker of the Chamber of Deputies and congressional representatives and senators on the defense committees of both chambers, the Commanders of the Navy and Air Force, the Director General of the Carabineros, the National Director of the Gendarmerie and the Director General of the Investigations Police, the Minister of Interior and Public Security, the Minister of Justice and other cabinet ministers, the President of the Supreme Court, religious leaders and representatives of the mainland and Easter Island ethnic minorities.

=== Inspection and beginning of the parade ===
At around 1430h each of the regiments of military and police cadets from all three military academies and the Carabineros School assemble at the Champ de Mars, where at 1500h, as each of the academies' bands play the National Anthem of Chile, the President, together with the Commander of the Army and the Minister of National Defense, inspect each of the cadet regiments assembled as they present arms and execute eyes right, while under a mounted escort from the 1st Cavalry (Horse Guards) Regiment "Guard Grenadiers", with their light blue Prussian styled uniforms. The President rides a horse-drawn carriage or open top limousine provided by the presidential office during the inspection phrase. After the cadets have each been inspected, the escort turns around and stops at the central grandstand at the park where they depart from the carriage to meet the other dignitaries and the parade then orders arms, and led by the band of the Chilean Military Academy playing its anthem Penachos Rojos (Red Plumes), the military and police academies' cadets, later on in slope arms position, march off the field to prepare for the march past of the cadets later on, with the Corps of Cadets of the Military Academy and its regimental band and Corps of Drums, all wearing Prussian blue uniforms with pickelhaube helmets, female cadets included since 2007 (the bandsmen carry red plumes in the pickenhauben while the cadets and the officers carry white plumes), leading the way for the entire parade of more than 8,000 military and police personnel, including vehicles and aircraft.

A Cueca performance, done in the parade since 1952 by the "Gil Letelier" Huasco Club, is the prelude civil act preceding the military parade on the nation's principal military holiday. The club offers a "chicha en cacho" (grape chicha) drink to the principal guests before the dancing proper, with music provided by the club's folk ensemble.

=== Parade proper ===
==== Permission of the parade commander to the President for the march past proper in quick time ====
Following the performance an Army officer holding the rank of either a Major General or Lieutenant General and holding the appointment of Commanding General, Santiago Metropolitan Region National Defense Prefecture, who serves as the parade commander, begins the following exchange as he arrives on horseback (formerly on a military vehicle) in front of the central grandstand where the President is stationed to salute the entire parade, and salutes his sword.

Parade commander: Mr./Mrs. President, sir/ma'am, may I now have the permission to march past the parade in honor of the anniversary of the glories of the Chilean Army.
President: Permission granted sir, you may proceed.

Ending the salute, the parade commander returns to his place, fronting his general staff, which since 2012 has been entirely mounted on horseback, as the crowd clap in applause to the report of the parade commander.

==== March past of the cadet academies ====
Following the report, the training officer of the Corps of Drums of the Military Academy, upon noticing that the commander has ridden back to his position in the parade, then orders the Corps of Cadets for the march past in the following manner:

Corps of drums... Eyes... front!! Band and drums, ready!
Military Academy, attention on parade! Companies in line formation, in quick marking time, forward... march!

The Drum Major of the Corps of Drums of the Military Academy, acting on the orders of his superior officer, begins the parade with the Prussian Parademarsch der Spielleute by the Corps and at the signal of his mace it then goose steps to the tune of the Preußischer Lockmarsch as a transition to the march past piece, the drum and bugle majors and the band conductor signal the formation to start forming in review order, with band instruments now at the ready to commence playing. Following this, to the tune of the Radetzky March the band and drums, in German tradition, all turn to the left and form in review order, the drums forming two ranks followed by the buglers, goose stepping past the grandstand in the eyes right at the signal of the drum and bugle majors and the band conductor and halting in place in order that the percussion section will take post between the band and the buglers. At the final signal of the drum and bugle majors and the band conductor to commence playing, the band, since the parade of 2017, first plays the Army Triumphal March first performed in 1882 during the Chilean occupation of Lima during the War of the Pacific as the parade commander, his adjutant, the command bugler and the parade general staff all walk past the central grandstand in horseback, saluting their swords in the eyes right except the mounted staff officers. It is followed by the Corps of Cadets of the Military Academy as the band changes the tune to the aforementioned Radetzky March, which is its regimental march past tune. The academy superintendent and his staff, the commandant of cadets, and battalion and company commanders all walk past the grandstand mounted per the Prussian tradition, all while saluting their swords in the eyes right, while all its cadets, the colour guard and the officer instructors march in the goose step tradition pass the grandstand past the principal guests, the cadets executing eyes right at this point and the officer instructors facing front.

Each of the four academies, together with the armed forces contingents that follow them later, march past in the parade in a traditionally arranged order of precedence. Following the army cadets, the Arturo Prat Naval Academy, the Manuel Ávalos Prado Air Force Academy and the Carabinier School President Carlos Ibáñez del Campo all march past with their respective bands, field music and corps of cadets, with the same order as the Army's to commence their respective segments, and with their bands forming up in review order in like manner. The Naval Academy Band and Corps of Drums, following the Navy's British traditions, aside from the drum major and the band conductor, does not field a bugle major, while the Carabinier School's Corps of Cadets, following the German tradition, wears uniforms of cavalry officers in the 1870s, with riding boots and sabres, excepting the foreign officer cadets, which march past in advance of their fellow cadets and salute on the eyes right. The Corps of Drums of the Air Force Academy and the Carabinier School both march into position with a special march cadence of the drummers and buglers first led by the drum and bugle majors before their respective march past tunes are played by their respective bands. Following the march past of their respective academies, these bands reform in march past order following the lead of their respective contingents, goose step away from the grandstand and at a distance away from it stop playing at the signal of the conductor and section leaders.

===== March past music of the other cadet academies =====
- Naval Academy: Nibelungen Marsch
- Air Force Academy: Gloria a los Héroes (with insert of See the conquering hero comes by Georg Friederich Händel)
- Carabiniers School: Parademarsch der langen Kerls
- National Investigative Police Academy: Zum Städtel Hinaus

===== Full order of the march past of the cadet academies =====
The parade march past order for the first part of the parade proper is organized into the following in march past order:

- Parade commander, adjutant and trumpeter
- Parade staff
- Corps of Cadets, Bernardo O'Higgins Military Academy
  - Academy Superintendent and staff
  - Colour Guard
  - 1st to 3rd Battalions, Corps of Cadets
    - 3 cadet companies each, all march past by companies
- Regiment of Naval Cadets, Arturo Prat Naval Academy
  - Academy Superintendent and staff
  - Colour Guard
  - 1st to 3rd Battalions, Corps of Cadets
    - 3 cadet companies each
- Corps of Cadets, Manuel Ávalos Prado Air Force Academy
  - Academy Superintendent and staff
  - Colour Guard
  - 1st to 3rd Groups, Corps of Cadets
    - 3 cadet squadrons each
- Corps of Cadets, Carabinier School President Carlos Ibáñez del Campo
  - Academy Superintendent and staff
  - Colour Guard
  - Foreign police officer cadet company
  - Women's cadet battalion
    - Two women's cadet companies each
  - 1st to 3rd Battalions, Corps of Cadets
    - 3 cadet companies each
  - Corps of Cadets of the Investigations Police of Chile National Investigative Police Academy
    - Academy Superintendent and staff
    - Colour guard
    - Foreign police officer cadet platoon
    - Women's cadet company
    - Male cadet company

==== March past of the service branches of the Armed Forces and the Carabineros ====
Following the cadet academies, the service branches of the Armed Forces and the Carabineros then march past the stands in the second and final part of the parade proper. The order of march past precedence is the Navy's contingent first, followed by the Air Force, Carabineros and finally the Army itself, with their bands and corps of drums forming up in review order to play in front of the grandstand and later in march past order in like manner as in the military academies and with the same order as the Army's to commence their respective segments, however the Air Force segment begins only at the signal of the drum major of the Corps of Drums of the Air Force NCO School when its turn arrives. The mounted band, which forms the centerpiece of the much awaited parade grand finale, forms up in the old German mounted band tradition first in playing order and then into the march out order, in the former, the Band and bugles sound the traditional Paradepost der Kavallerie as the kettledrummers beat up first at the gallop past the grandstand, then at the trot at the north audience stands, and the into position between the two sections, all the while as the band and bugles form in review order on the trot and the crowd claps loud to cheer the band and kettledrummers on and to appreciate the hard work and training done by the mounted bandsmen, in the latter the Preußischer Präsentiermarsch (formerly Preußens Gloria) and then Los Viejos Estandartes is played as the band and bugles trot off the field, the crowd all the more applauding the effort made during this segment. In addition to the ground march past and mounted column, a parade mobile column (in special years) and fly past segment from each of the service branches of the Armed Forces and the Carabineros also take place as well.

===== March past music of the service branches' contingents =====
- Navy (Seamen's Training School): Regimiento Escuela en Desfile
- Navy (Fleet Forces, BE Esmeralda, Naval Reserve and Naval Polytechnical Academy): Recuerdos de 30 años (arrangement of the German song Schier dreissig Jahre bist du alt)
- Navy (Marine Corps): Himno de la Infanteria de Marina
- Air Force NCO School: Alte Kameraden
- Air Force ground air crew formations: Fanfaren voran
- Air Force ground infantry, special forces and dismounted air defense formations plus mobile column (on special occasions only): Kreuzritter-Fanfare Marsch
- Carabineros foot contingents: Secunderabad March
  - NCO School: Escuela Macul
  - Special Operations: Heroes del Arauco
- Carabineros mounted contingents: Fehrbelliner Reitermarsch
- Carabineros mobile column: Por Cuarto en Desfile
- Chilean Army ground proper and mobile column (the latter on special occasions only)
  - Army Massed Band march in and march out and Army command and colours guard march past segment: Los Viejos Estandartes
  - Army Reserve and UN Peacekeepers ("Chile" Battalion and Southern Cross Joint Task Force): Honores al Palena
  - Army historical segment
    - 1st Infantry Regiment Grenadiers Platoon: Le Régiment de Sambre et Meuse
    - 4th Company, 6th Infantry Regiment: Himno del Regimiento Chacabuco
    - Army Infantry School Historical Company : Preußens Gloria
    - State Horse Artillery Battery, 1st Artillery Regiment: Parademarsch der 18er Husaren
  - Army Schools: Mi fusil y yo (with melody from Märkische Heide)
    - Army NCO School and War College: Dragonantes on Parade March (former traditional), Marsch des Hessischen Kreisregiments und des Regiments Landgraf (modern)
    - Army Infantry School: Blaue Brigade-Marsch
    - Army Engineers School: Blaue Brigade-Marsch
    - Army Communications School: Fridericus Rex-Grenadiermarsch
    - Army Services School: Cuando Flamea mi Bandera
  - Army combat units
    - 2nd Motorized Division and Santiago General Garrison Command: Adios al Septimo de Linea and Himno de la 2da Division
      - 1st Infantry Regiment: Himno del Regimiento Buin
      - 2nd Infantry Regiment: Himno del Regimiento Maipo
      - 1st Artillery Regiment
      - 1st Military Police Regiment
      - 16th Infantry Regiment: Le Clarions d' Avranches
    - 3rd Mountain Division: Himno de la Alta Montana, Himno del Boina Verde and Himno de la 3ra Division
      - 3rd Mountain Regiment: Deutschmeister Regiments-Marsch
      - 12th Infantry Regiment: Himno del Regimiento Sangra
      - Army Mountain School: Himno de la Escuela de Montana
    - Army Special Forces School and Special Forces Brigade: Los Viejos Estandartes (sung live, formerly Petersburger marsch)
  - Army mobile column (on special occasions only)
    - Army motorized and mechanized formations and field and air defense artillery: Bateria 280, Recuerdos de 40 anos and En revevant de la revue
    - Army armoured formations: Panzerlied
- Chilean Army mounted column
  - 1st Cavalry (Presidential Horse Guards) Regiment "Guard Grenadiers": Der Königgrätzer marsch (gallop past)

===== Full order of the march past of the service branches of the Armed Forces and the Carabineros =====
The parade march past order for the second part of the parade proper is organized into the following in march past order:

- Chilean Navy
  - Contingent commander, adjutant and staff
  - Regiment of Aspirants, Navy Seamen's Training School (on special occasions only)
    - School command and staff
    - Colour Guard
    - 1st to 5th Battalions, Regiment of Aspirants
      - Battalion command
      - 3 cadet companies each, all march past by companies or as a whole battalion
  - Naval Reserve
    - Company command
    - 3 platoons of reserve officers
  - BE Esmeralda Officers' Company (on special occasions only)
    - Company commander
    - 3 platoons of training officers
  - Regiment of Cadets, Naval Polytechnical Academy
    - Academy Superintendent and staff
    - Colour Guard
    - Massed colour guard of the Navy (optional)
    - 1st to 6th Battalions, Regiment of Cadets
      - Battalion command
      - 3 to 4 cadet companies each, all march past by companies or as a whole battalion
  - Fleet Forces (special occasions only, last march past was in 1992)
    - Contingent commander and staff
    - Colour Guard
    - 1 to 5 battalions of naval crewmen
      - Battalion command
      - 3 to 4 companies each, all march past by companies or as a whole battalion
  - Naval Special Forces
    - Contingent commander and staff
    - 3 special forces companies
  - Marine Corps
    - Contingent commander and staff
    - Colour guard of Expeditionary Brigade
    - Special forces and HQ company
    - 3 Marine battalions of Expeditionary Brigade
      - Battalion command
      - 3-4 companies each, march past as whole battalion
- Chilean Air Force
  - Contingent commander, adjutant and staff
  - Colour guard
  - Regiment of NCO Cadets, Air Force NCO School
    - School command and staff
    - Colour Guard
    - 1st to 3rd Groups, Regiment of NCO Cadets
      - 3 cadet squadrons each, all march past by squadrons
  - Ground aircrews and advanced NCOs contingent
    - Contingent commander and staff
    - Colour Guard, Advanced NCO School
    - 1 to 3 (up to 6) groups of airmen and aircrews
      - 3 squadrons each, all march past by whole groups
  - Conscript battalion
    - One women's company
    - Company of male conscripts
  - Air Defense Artillery and Special Forces Regiment and Air Force Infantry
    - Contingent commander
    - Massed colour guard
    - Air Defense dismounted artillery (1 battalion)
    - Special Forces (1 battalion)
    - Air Force Infantry (1 battalion)
      - Battalion command
      - 3 companies in each battalion, all march past by whole battalions
- Carabineros de Chile
  - Contingent commander, adjutant and staff
  - Colour guard
  - Historical company
  - Foreign police NCO cadets' company
  - Regiment of Aspirants, Basic Training School
    - School command and staff
    - Colour Guard
    - 1st to 3rd Battalions, Regiment of Aspirants (1st Battalion female, 2nd and 3rd battalions male cadets)
      - Battalion command
      - 3 companies each, all march past by whole battalions
  - Regiment of NCO Cadets, NCO Training School
    - School command and staff
    - Colour Guard
    - 1st to 3rd Battalions, Regiment of NCO Cadets (1st Battalion female, 2nd and 3rd battalions male cadets)
      - Battalion command
      - 3 companies each, all march past by whole battalions
  - Frontier School
    - School command and staff
    - Colour Guard
    - Cadet battalion
      - 3 companies each, all march past by whole battalion
  - Special Operations Group
  - K-9 Training School
    - School command and staff
    - Colour Guard
    - Cadet battalion
      - 3 companies each, all march past by whole battalion
  - Carabineros mounted column
    - Contingent commander, adjutant and staff
    - Colour guard, Equestrian School
    - Historical troop
    - Public security mounted police
    - Presidential Guard Group Cavalry Troop
    - Cuadro Verde Equestrian Demonstration Team
      - 3 platoons each, all trot past by troops
- Chilean Army ground column
  - Contingent commander, adjutant and staff
  - Colour guard
  - Historical segment
    - 1st Infantry Regiment Grenadiers Platoon
    - 4th Company, 6th Infantry Regiment
    - Army Infantry School Historical Company
    - State Horse Artillery Battery, 1st Artillery Regiment
  - Army Reserve
    - Contingent commander, adjutant and staff
    - Reserve battalion
      - Battalion command
      - 1-4 reserve companies, march past as part of battalion
  - Army Doctrine and Education Command
    - Contingent commander, adjutant and staff with representatives from Army War College
    - Regiment of Cadets, Army NCO School
      - School superintendent, adjutant and staff
      - Colour Guard
      - 1st to 3rd Battalions, Regiment of Cadets
        - Battalion commanders
        - 3 cadet companies each, all march past as whole regiment
    - Regiment of Cadets, Army Infantry School
      - School superintendent, adjutant and staff
      - Colour Guard
      - 1st to 3rd Battalions, Regiment of Cadets
        - Battalion commanders
        - 3 cadet companies each, all march past as whole battalion or regiment
    - Regiment of Cadets, Army Engineers School
      - School superintendent, adjutant and staff
      - Colour Guard
      - 1st to 3rd Battalions, Regiment of Cadets
        - Battalion commanders
        - 3 cadet companies each, all march past as whole battalion or regiment
    - Regiment of Cadets, Army Communications School
      - School superintendent, adjutant and staff
      - Colour Guard
      - 1st to 3rd Battalions, Regiment of Cadets
        - Battalion commanders
        - 3 cadet companies each, all march past as whole battalion or regiment
    - Regiment of Cadets, Army Services School
      - School superintendent, adjutant and staff
      - Colour Guard
      - 1st to 3rd Battalions, Regiment of Cadets
        - Battalion commanders
        - 3 cadet companies each, all march past as whole battalion or regiment
  - Army Operations Command - 2nd Motorized Division and Santiago General Garrison Command
    - Contingent commander, adjutant and staff
    - 1st Infantry Regiment
      - Regimental commander, adjutant and staff
      - Colour guard
      - 1st Battalion, 1st IR
        - Battalion command
        - 3 companies each
    - 2nd Infantry Regiment
      - Regimental commander, adjutant and staff
      - Colour guard
      - 1st Battalion, 2nd IR
        - Battalion command
        - 3 companies each
    - 1st Artillery Regiment
      - Regimental commander, adjutant and staff
      - Colour guard
      - 1st Battalion, 1st AR
        - Battalion command
        - 3 batteries each
    - 1st Military Police Regiment
      - Regimental commander, adjutant and staff
      - Colour guard
      - 1st Battalion, 1st MP Regt.
        - Battalion command
        - 3 MP companies each
  - Army Operations Command - 3rd Mountain Division
    - Contingent commander, adjutant and staff
    - 3rd Infantry Regiment (Mountain)
      - Regimental commander, adjutant and staff
      - Colour guard
      - 1st - 3rd Battalions, 3rd IR
        - Battalion command
        - 3 companies each
      - Mountain mule company
    - 12th Infantry Regiment (Mountain)
      - Regimental commander, adjutant and staff
      - Colour guard
      - 1st Battalion, 12th IR
        - Battalion command
        - 3 companies each
    - Regiment of the Army Mountain School
      - School superintendent, adjutant and staff
      - Colour Guard
      - 1st to 3rd Battalions, Regiment of Cadets
        - Battalion commanders
        - 3 cadet companies each, all march past as whole battalion
  - Army Operations Command - Special Operations Brigade
    - Brigade commander, adjutant and staff
    - Colour guard
    - Army Special Forces School
      - School superintendent, adjutant and staff
      - 1st to 3rd Battalions
        - Battalion commanders
        - 3 cadet companies each, all march past as whole battalion or regiment
    - Composite battalion of special forces personnel
      - Contingent commander, adjutant and staff
      - 3 special forces companies
- Chilean Army mounted column
  - Regimental commander, adjutant and staff, 1st Cavalry (Horse Guards) Regiment "Guard Grenadiers"
  - Colour guard
  - Mounted Ceremonial Squadron, 1st Cav Reg
    - Squadron command
    - 3-4 troops each, all gallop past by troops

Should a mobile column be present:

- Mobile column contingent commander, adjutant and staff

Each of the units of the Army, Air Force and Carabineros that provide the column are to be organized into:

- Mobile battalion (motorized and mechanized infantry, armoured, field and air defense artillery, communications, engineering, police operations)
  - Battalion commanders, adjutant and staff
  - Relief colour guard of regiment/brigade represented (Army 1st battalions of regiments only)
  - 3 companies/batteries/squadrons each, all drive past as whole battalion (including supply elements)

== See also ==
- Chilean Army
- Military of Chile
- Fiestas Patrias (Chile)
