= Battle of Huamachuco =

1883 final battle of the War of the Pacific

- Part of the War of the Pacific
- The long way to the Battle of Huamachuco
| Date | 10 July 1883 |
| Location | Near Huamachuco, Peru |
| Result | Chilean victory |

Belligerents
| Chile | Peru |

Commanders and leaders
| (Chile) Alejandro Gorostiaga | (Peru) Andrés A. Cáceres (Peru) Pedro Silva Gil † (Peru) Enrique Oppenheimer † |

Strength
| 1,500 soldiers | 1,880 soldiers hundreds of montoneras and milicians |

Casualties and losses
| 68 killed 96 wounded | 900 killed 300 captured |

The Battle of Huamachuco was fought on the 10 July 1883, and it was the last major battle of the War of the Pacific. The Chilean soldiers, led by Colonel Alejandro Gorostiaga, decisively defeated the Peruvian army commanded by General Andrés Avelino Cáceres near the town of Huamachuco. This Chilean victory effectively eliminated Cáceres' Ejército de la Breña, ending any real threat or resistance in the Peruvian Andes. The Peruvian defeat paved the way for the Treaty of Ancón that finally put an end to the war. Also, one of Peru's greatest heroes, Colonel Leoncio Prado, died as a consequence of this battle.

== Background ==
The defeats suffered by the Chilean Army at Marcavalle, Pucará and Concepcion, in addition to the decimation of their troops due to poor sanitation, convinced the Chilean High Command of the need to completely abandon the Central Andes. This retreat was made possible by the Chilean victory at Tarma Tambo on 15 July 1882. By that time, the occupation troops had been reduced to about half their original size. Peruvian General Andrés Cáceres controlled the Mantaro valley and had even briefly possessed the city of Huancayo. He established his command in Tarma and busied himself with reorganizing his army. By January 1883, Cáceres had raised his troops to 3,200 well-armed and equipped men, and commanded central Peru.

Faced with this threat to the peace negotiations, Admiral Patricio Lynch, the Chilean Commander-in-Chief, decided to send a new force against General Cáceres. This new army comprised three divisions, under the command of Colonels García, del Canto and Arriagada. The Chilean army was well armed, and had learned the lessons of previous forays into the high Andes. Their plan was to surround and corner the Peruvians to force them into a conventional battle. Soon after they captured the strategic city of Jauja and on May 5 they reunited the forces in the city of Chiqlla. Faced with this grave threat, the Peruvian army retreated north.

On May 30 the Peruvian army arrived at Cerro de Pasco, with the Chilean divisions under Colonels del Canto and García in close pursuit. Under those circumstances, the Peruvians continued to retreat into the high Andes. By the third week of June the Peruvians were in critical condition as the Chileans had almost cornered them. On June 22 General Cáceres ordered a retreat via the Llankanuku pass, located at an altitude of 3,850 meters and some 200 km (125 mi) north-west of Cerro de Pasco. Thanks to this risky maneuver he managed to evade the main Chilean force.

After many more hardships, on July 5 the Peruvian army arrived at Tulpo, near Huamachuco, a further 120 km (75 mi) north of the Llankanuku Pass. The distances marched in the time taken—across some of the highest mountains in the world—by the Peruvians were astounding. Unfortunately, at Tulpo, General Cáceres learned that the Chilean Colonel Alejandro Gorostiaga was occupying the town. Whilst the colonel was isolated from the main body of the Chilean army, another Chilean group was advancing from the rear to reinforce him in the town and to help push the Peruvians towards Cajamarca. This second Chilean group carried an ammunition supply for Gorostiaga.

Cáceres decided to try to destroy this reinforcement before it could reach Gorostiaga's division, but Chilean scouts were on the alert and the planned surprise attack failed. At that point, the Peruvian general called a war council and the decision was taken to stop retreating and to try to destroy the Chilean forces occupying the town.

== The battle ==
=== Forces deployment ===
On 8 July 1883, the Peruvian forces - about 2,000 soldiers, plus a few hundred Indian guerrillas called montoneras - took positions on Cuyulga hill and on the facing Purrubamba hill, both overlooking the city. The Peruvians were armed with Peabody and Remington rifles, but didn't have much ammunition or bayonets. Originally General Cáceres divided his troops, with half on the Cuyulga hill and the rest on the left of it, to try to cut off the enemy from behind. However, as soon as Gorostiaga saw the Peruvians on the top of the hills, he immediately gathered all his troops and evacuated the city, taking position in the Sazón hill, a perfect defensive position, with steep slopes and with a very difficult access facing the Cuyulga, a defensive position that in addition sported some Inca ruins that were to be used as parapets.

=== Engagement ===
When the Peruvians saw that Gorostiaga had moved out, they moved into the town and took control of it, effectively cutting off the Chilean escape route. Later, on the 8th and all through the 9th of July there were a few artillery exchanges, but the final Peruvian assault was reserved for the early hours of the 10 July. Cáceres' plan was to initiate the attack by destroying his enemy's most vulnerable position, southeast of Sazón hill. As the Chileans observed the threat posed by the Peruvian advance, they in turn rapidly moved their vanguard down the hill to try to contain the menace, counter-attacking the Peruvian right flank on Cuyulga hill. Two companies of the Chilean Zapadores Regiment managed to get down the Sazón heading for the Peruvian positions on Santa Bárbara hill.

Cáceres responded by sending two companies of his Junín and Jauja regiments. These troops found fierce opposition and became bogged down in the fighting now occurring in the area. To support his infantry, Cáceres also sent forward a few companies of the Cazadores de Concepción and Marcavalle regiments; with this move Cáceres was seeking to surround the Chilean troops who were by then in retreat. Col. Gorostiaga tried to stop this evolving Peruvian movement by sending a company of the Concepción Battalion, under Lieutenant Luis Dell'Orto, to stall the attack of the Peruvian Colonel Luis Germán Astete's division. One after another the Chilean companies entered into battle at the same rate the Peruvian regiments did. For a moment both armies were on equal footing, while the Chilean right wing was defended by one company of the Talca Battalion facing the troops of General Manuel Cáceres.

Outnumbered, the Chilean forces were forced to retreat to their own lines under heavy Peruvian attack. Little by little the Peruvians started to push the Chilean line back up onto the summit of the Sazón hill. The Chilean artillery was silenced and regrouped on the left of the Chilean lines, protected by the cavalry and the Zapadores Regiment, plus troops of the Concepción and Talca units. The Peruvians almost got to the top of the hill.

After four hours of fighting, Cáceres sensed victory. Gorostiaga's forces were reduced to defending themselves on their parapets at the very top of the Sazón. It was at that moment that the Peruvians started to run out of ammunition. Faced with this fact, Cáceres made a fatal mistake: he ordered his artillery to relocate to the valley facing the hill in order to provide the final coup. Gorostiaga saw this tactical error and ordered a cavalry charge by a squadron of the Cazadores a Caballo Cav. Regiment led by Sergeant Major Sofanor Parra. against the Peruvian guns. The defenceless artillery men were either dispersed or killed, the Peruvians losing seven cannons in the process.

=== Chilean counter-attack ===
Meanwhile, the Chileans quickly reorganised themselves and launched a massive bayonet counter-attack against the outnumbering Peruvian lines. Cáceres' Peruvians soldiers, who lacked bayonets, and with almost no ammunition by then, could only defend themselves with the butts of their rifles; their montoneras allies at least had spears to defend themselves with. The Chilean downhill counter-attack broke the Peruvian lines. The formations of the Peruvian troops collapsed and the remnants started to flee from the battlefield. With this last attack the Chileans achieved victory. A few moments later, their infantry supported by two cannons, took the Peruvian basecamp at Cuyulga hill, ending the battle.

== Aftermath ==
The Peruvians lost 800 men - almost one third of their forces - including a large number of their officers. Among the dead were General Pedro Silva, Chief of Staff Colonel Manuel Tafur, and the four divisional chiefs: Luis Germán Astete, Manuel Cáceres, Juan Gastó and Máximo Tafur. Many more died or were executed after the battle, among them one of Peru's greatest heroes, Colonel Leoncio Prado, due to failing to keep his word to not fight in the war, which had been the condition for his release when he was previously captured by the Chileans at Tarata. General Cáceres, injured, was able to escape and evade capture. The battle effectively ended all further Peruvian resistance and the Treaty of Ancón, putting an end to the war, was signed just three months later, on October 20, 1883.

== Order of battle ==
Peruvian Army

- Commanding General: General Andres Avelino Cáceres
- Northern Detachment Commander: Colonel Issac Recavarren
  - 1st Division (Col. Aragones)
    - 4th Infantry Battalion Pucara
    - 5th Infantry Battalion Pisagua
  - 2nd Division (Col. Salazar)
    - 11th Infantry Battalion Tarma
    - 12th Infantry Battalion Huallaga
- Army of the Center Commander: Colonel Francisco de Paula Secada
  - 1st Division (Col. Manuel Cáceres)
    - 1st Infantry Battalion Tarapaca
    - 2nd Infantry Battalion Zepita
  - 2nd Division (Col. Juan Gasto)
    - 6th Infantry Battalion Marcavalle
    - 7th Infantry Battalion Concepcion
  - 3rd Division (Col. Maximo Tafur)
    - 3rd Infantry Battalion Junin
    - 9th Infantry Battalion Jauja
  - 4th Division (Cpt. Luis Germán Astete)
    - 8th Infantry Battalion Apata
    - 10th Infantry Battalion San Jeronimo
  - Cavalry
    - Peruvian Horse Rifles Squadron (Sgt. Maj. Zavala)
    - Tarma Escort Squadron (Sgt. Maj. Zapatel)
  - Artillery Brigade (Col. of Artillery Rios)

Chilean Army

- Commander in Chief: Colonel Alejandro Gorostiaga
  - Concepcion Infantry Battalion (Lt. Col. Herminio Gonzalez)
  - Talca Infantry Battalion (Lt. Col. Alejandro Cruz)
  - Zapadores Infantry Battalion Companies (Captain Canales)
  - Piquete del Victoria Artillery Park (Lt. Col. Garcia)
  - Mounted Hunters Squadron (Lt. Col. Novoa)
  - Artillery Brigade (Sgt. Major Fontecilla)

== Additional information ==
=== Bibliography ===
- (1883). "A Great Chilian Victory." The New York Times August 14.
- Markham, C. R. (1892). A History of Peru. Chicago: Sergel.
- Scheina, Robert (2003). Latin America's Wars: The Age of the Caudillo. Dulles, VA: Brasseys.
- Thurner, Mark (1997). From Two Republics to One Divided. Durham: Duke University Press.
