= Alejandro Gorostiaga =

19th-century Chilean military officer

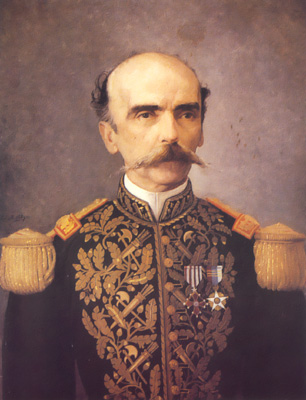
- Birth name: Alejandro Gorostiaga Orrego
- Born: May 12, 1840; La Serena, Chile
- Died: October 30, 1912 (aged 72); Santiago, Chile
- Allegiance: Chile
- Battles / wars: War of the Pacific; Battle of Pisagua; Battle of Tacna; Battle of Huamachuco

Alejandro Gorostiaga Orrego (May 12, 1840 – October 30, 1912), was a Chilean military officer born in La Serena. He joined the Escuela Militar de Chile in 1857 until his retirement in 1878. Alejandro Gorostiaga was of Basque descent.

In 1879, colonel Gorostiaga joined the Chilean Army due to the War of the Pacific, between Chile, Peru and Bolivia. In May of that year, Alejandro Gorostiaga was named commandant of the civic battalion Coquimbo Nº1.

He participated in the Battle of Pisagua. But the most important participation of this Chilean military officer was the Battle of Huamachuco, on July 10 of 1883 when Andrés Cáceres' Peruvian forces were defeated.

Alejandro Gorostiaga died in 1912, in Santiago.
