= Pedro Silva Gil =

Peruvian general

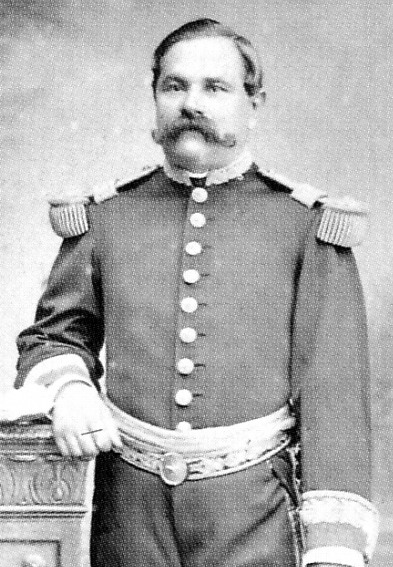
- Born: August 2, 1820; Lima, Lima Province, Viceroyalty of Peru
- Died: October 7, 1883 (aged 63); Huamachuco, Sánchez Carrión Province, Peru
- Burial place: Cementerio Presbítero Matías Maestro, Lima, Peru
- Military career
- Allegiance: Peru
- Branch: Peruvian Army
- Service years: 1841 — 1883
- Rank: Brigadier General
- Conflicts: War of the Pacific: Battle of San Juan and Chorrillos; Battle of Miraflores; Battle of Huamachuco †

Pedro Silva Gil (1820-1883) was a Peruvian brigadier general serving under the Peruvian Army. At the outbreak of the War of the Pacific in 1879 he was already retired, but he requested and obtained his return to service, being appointed Chief of Staff of the Defense Army of Lima. He fought in the Battles of San Juan and Miraflores in 1881. He then joined the resistance of the mountains led by General Andrés Avelino Cáceres and was killed in the Battle of Huamachuco.

== Biography ==
He was the second son of the marriage of Remigio Silva and María Gil, residents of the San Lázaro neighborhood, in Lima. His father was a prominent patriot, a member of the network of conspirators in the then capital of the Viceroyalty of Peru, and brother of Brigida Silva de Ochoa, another distinguished patriot. His brothers were, among others, the frigate captain José Manuel Silva, the convent nun of the Trinitarias Carmen Silva and Manuel Trinidad Silva, who was Director General of Justice.

== Military service ==
He began military service in 1841, and due to his outstanding performance in various campaigns he earned successive promotions until he reached the rank of Brigadier General. He became Chief of Staff and Inspector General of the Army.

At the outbreak of the War of the Pacific he was already retired, but despite his years, he requested a position of responsibility in the national army. His request was granted, and in 1880 he was entrusted with the leadership of the General Staff of the Defense Army of Lima under the orders of the dictator Nicolás de Piérola.

Despite being a veteran, he knew how to adapt to modern tactics and contributed to the organization, equipping and training of the army destined for the defense of Lima, overcoming great difficulties. He participated in the battles of San Juan and Miraflores, on January 13 and 15, 1881 and acted directly on the battlefield. During the Battle of San Juan and Chorrillos, he ordered that the Huánuco battalion advance to the neck of the Cerro "Viva el Perú", that the Paucarpata battalion support it and that the Áncash battalion reinforce the Cáceres division; He also ordered the withdrawal of Belisario Suárez and that the cavalry moved in support of César Canevaro. All his measures delayed the advance of the enemy, showing initiative, despite the deficiencies of his troops in both training and war material.

When the Battle of Miraflores broke out, Silva immediately moved to the Peruvian right flank in support of the violent counterattack carried out by the Peruvian arms, personally leading the reinforcements of the line between Cáceres and Suárez. He was injured in the action. Already recovered from his wounds, he marched to the Sierra to continue the war of resistance, under the orders of Cáceres.

On the eve of the battle of Huamachuco, in one night, with a company of the Zepita battalion he entered the city and seized part of the Chilean cavalry. During the Battle of Huamachuco, Silva was wounded in the thigh and his horse was killed, but he did not want to leave the field. Covering the wound with a handkerchief, he continued fighting, until a machete blow to his head killed him, at the foot of Cerro Sazón.

His remains rest in the Crypt of the Heroes in the Presbítero Maestro Cemetery in Lima.

== Bibliography ==
- Basadre Grohmann, Jorge: Historia de la República del Perú (1822 - 1933), Tomo 9. Editada por la Empresa Editora El Comercio S. A. Lima, 2005. ISBN 9972-205-71-1 (V.9)
- Vargas Ugarte, Rubén: Historia General del Perú, Tomo X. La República (1879-1884). Lima, Editorial Milla Batres, 1984. Segunda Edición.
- Congrains Martin, Eduardo: Batalla de Miraflores. Tomo 10 de la Biblioteca Histórica Ecoma. Serie “Reivindicación”. 1º edición, Lima, febrero de 1977. Editorial ECOMA S.A.
