= VI Army Division (Chile) =

Army unit in Chile

- Active: 2007
- Country: Chile
- Branch: Army
- Type: Armor and Infantry
- Size: Division

The VI Army Division is an operational unit of the Chilean Army based in Iquique, Tarapacá region. Its towns of jurisdiction includes the regions of Tarapacá, Arica and Parinacota.
