= Brigida Silva de Ochoa =

Brigida Silva de Ochoa was born in Peru in 1776. She came from a family of insurgents in the Peruvian war of independence. Her older brother, Coronal Remigio Silva, was arrested during the conspiracy of 1809 and imprisoned, and her younger brother Mateo was a supporter of the failed governmental overthrow of 1809. Mateo was arrested and imprisoned for ten years. At age 18 she married Francisco Ochoa Camargo, a Cuzco native, who shared her family’s politics.

She devoted her life to helping imprisoned insurgents, especially those who were sent to Spain after the failed uprising of Aguilar and Ubaide in Cuzco. She also served as an intermediary, transporting communication between the patriots on the outskirts of the capital. Although this task was dangerous, she was never caught nor suspected of involvement since her oldest son worked as an officer in the Artillery, at the service of the King of Spain. This situation gave her easy access to where her brother Remigio was imprisoned and permitted her to have inside information which was used to help the patriots in their victory at Maipu.
