= Los Viejos Estandartes =

Official hymn and march of the Chilean Army

The Old Banners
- Los viejos estandartes
- Chilean Army logo
- Lyrics: Jorge Inostroza
- Music: Willy Bascuñán, 1966
- Adopted: 1976; 49 years ago

Los viejos estandartes (Spanish: [los ˈβjexos estanˈdaɾtes]; The Old Banners) is the official hymn and march of the Chilean Army.

Despite its symbolism associated to Augusto Pinochet's regime, the march also has been sung by socialist politicians like the president Michelle Bachelet or José Antonio Viera-Gallo.

== Origin ==
The march was inspired by the return of Manuel Baquedano to the city of Valparaíso in 1881 during the War of the Pacific. The lyrics were composed by Jorge Inostroza and the music was created by Willy Bascuñán, a member of Los Cuatro Cuartos. The song was included in the album ¡Al 7° de Línea! by Los Cuatro Cuartos which was released in 1966 and was acclaimed by both the public and critics, reaching the top of the music charts in Chile.

"Los viejos estandartes" was used alongside the "Himno de Yungay" in official ceremonies from 1967 onward, becoming part of the official repertoire of songs played by military and civil marching bands on national holidays. It was officially adopted as the official hymn of the Chilean Army in 1976, the 90th anniversary since the conclusion of the War of the Pacific.

== Bibliography ==
- History of Los Cuatro Cuartos
