= 1st Cavalry Regiment (Chile) =

1st Cavalry (Presidential Horse Guards) Regiment "Grenadiers"
- Regimiento Escolta Presidencial n.º 1 "Granaderos"
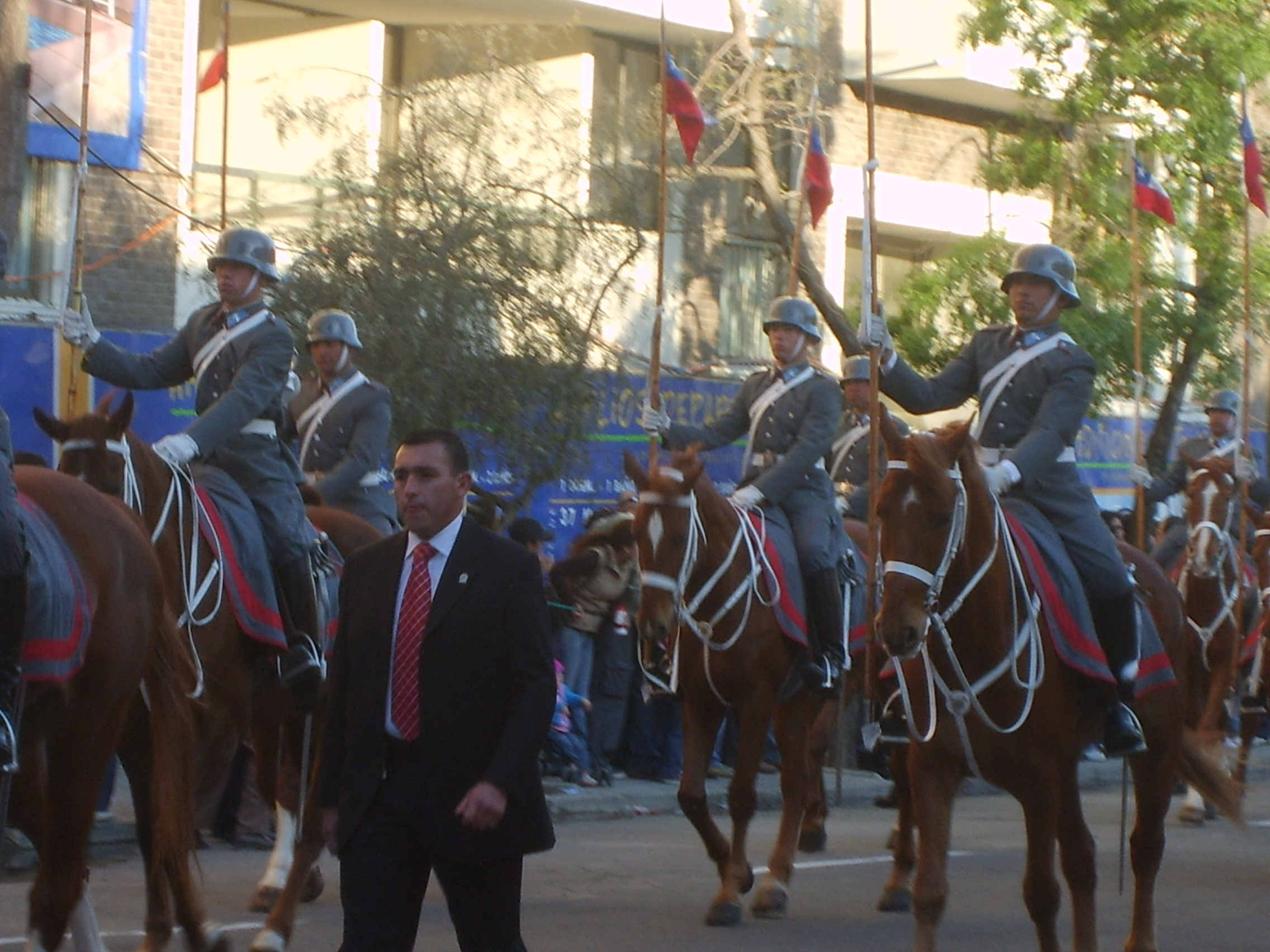
- Active: Since 1827
- Country: Chile
- Branch: Chilean Army
- Type: Horse Guards
- Role: Public duties
- Size: Reduced group of 1 escort squadron and 1 training squadron
- Garrison/HQ: RHQ – Quillota
- Patron: Manuel Bulnes
- March: Preußens Gloria(walk march); Der Königgrätzer marsch (gallop past)

The 1st Cavalry (Horse Guards) Regiment "Grenadiers" (Spanish: Regimiento Escolta Presidencial n.º 1 «Granaderos») is the senior cavalry regiment of the Chilean Army, which serves as the Horse Guards unit providing the ceremonial escort in parades and ceremonies to the President of Chile, the Supreme Commander of the Chilean Armed Forces. It provides the guard during flag raising ceremonies monthly in Santiago, the national capital. Together with the 3rd Cavalry Regiment "Hussars" it forms the remaining mounted components of the army in active service.

== History ==
The Grenadiers were formed on July 6, 1827 as the then second regiment of cavalry of the reorganized Chilean Army per a presidential decree by President Francisco Antonio Pinto, and its honorific title is a remembrance of the regiment's first commanding officer, future president Manuel Bulnes. The designation of "Horse Grenadiers" is a remembrance of the role played by the Argentine Regiment of Mounted Grenadiers in assisting the young Army in the campaigns for the independence of Chile in 1818. The regiment's baptism of fire was in the Chilean Civil War of 1829–1830 and later fought in the Chilean campaigns of the War of the Confederation and for its contribution for the total collapse of the Peru-Bolivia Confederation was rewarded by being bestowed the duty as the presidential horse guards regiment in Santiago, serving until 1862 on public duties activities, having left that role to help in the Chilean Army actions during the long Occupation of Araucanía.

The regiment later saw action during the Chilean ground campaign of the War of the Pacific, having won laurels of glory for the nation in Pisagua, Dolores, Tarapacá, Tacna and Chorrillos, and later on briefly during the Chilean Civil War of 1891.

As part of the wide reorganization of the Army following that war the Grenadiers were reorganized in the early 1900s, co-sharing the duties of the presidential horse guard with the then Cavalry Regiment "Mounted Rifles" and the Army 5th Carabineer Regiment, the predecessor of the current Carabineros de Chile, with the regiment forming a dismounted ceremonial squadron armed in the same manner as Prussian dragoons of the era, a duty it would later share with the Army Mounted Ceremonial Troop, wearing Garde de Corps styled uniforms, and the Army Cavalry School Mounted Regiment, which was dressed in the manner of the cuirassiers, alongside the current Carabineros School. In 1932 the Grenadiers were relegated to being only the travelling escort, as the Carabineros officially raised the then 200-man La Moneda Palace Guard that year as the permanent presidential security unit.

In 1982, the regiment was transferred away to the frontier town of Putre in the Arica y Parinacota Region, while being rerolled as armored cavalry retained the traditions of cavalry with a mounted squadron due to its highland terrain. The Mounted Ceremonial Troop remained with the Army as a directly reporting unit.

In 1999, the regiment was relocated to its current stables in Camp San Isidro in the western city of Quillota, Valparaíso Region, wherein it was reassigned the duties of being the travelling escort to the President, merging the Mounted Ceremonial Troop to it. Today it maintains the primary purpose of protocol and ceremonial public duties as the most senior regiment of cavalry of the modern day Chilean Army, and one of only 2 regiments left standing in the role of mounted cavalry. Alongside being the travelling escort unit, it maintains guards at the Plaza de la Ciudadanía in Santiago monthly for flag raising ceremonies held there. The regiment's change of command ceremony is the only one in the army wherein most of it is done while mounted, reflecting the long traditions of the Chilean Army cavalry.

=== Organization of the current regiment ===
- Regimental HQ
- Regimental Band
- Presidential Mounted Ceremonial Squadron
  - 1st Mounted Ceremonial Troop
    - Troop HQ
    - 3 mounted platoons
  - 2nd Mounted Ceremonial Troop
    - Troop HQ
    - 3 mounted platoons
  - Training Troop
- Dismounted Honors Company
  - 3 Guards Platoons (dismounted)
- Reserve Squadron
  - Reserve Training Center

==== Regimental Band ====
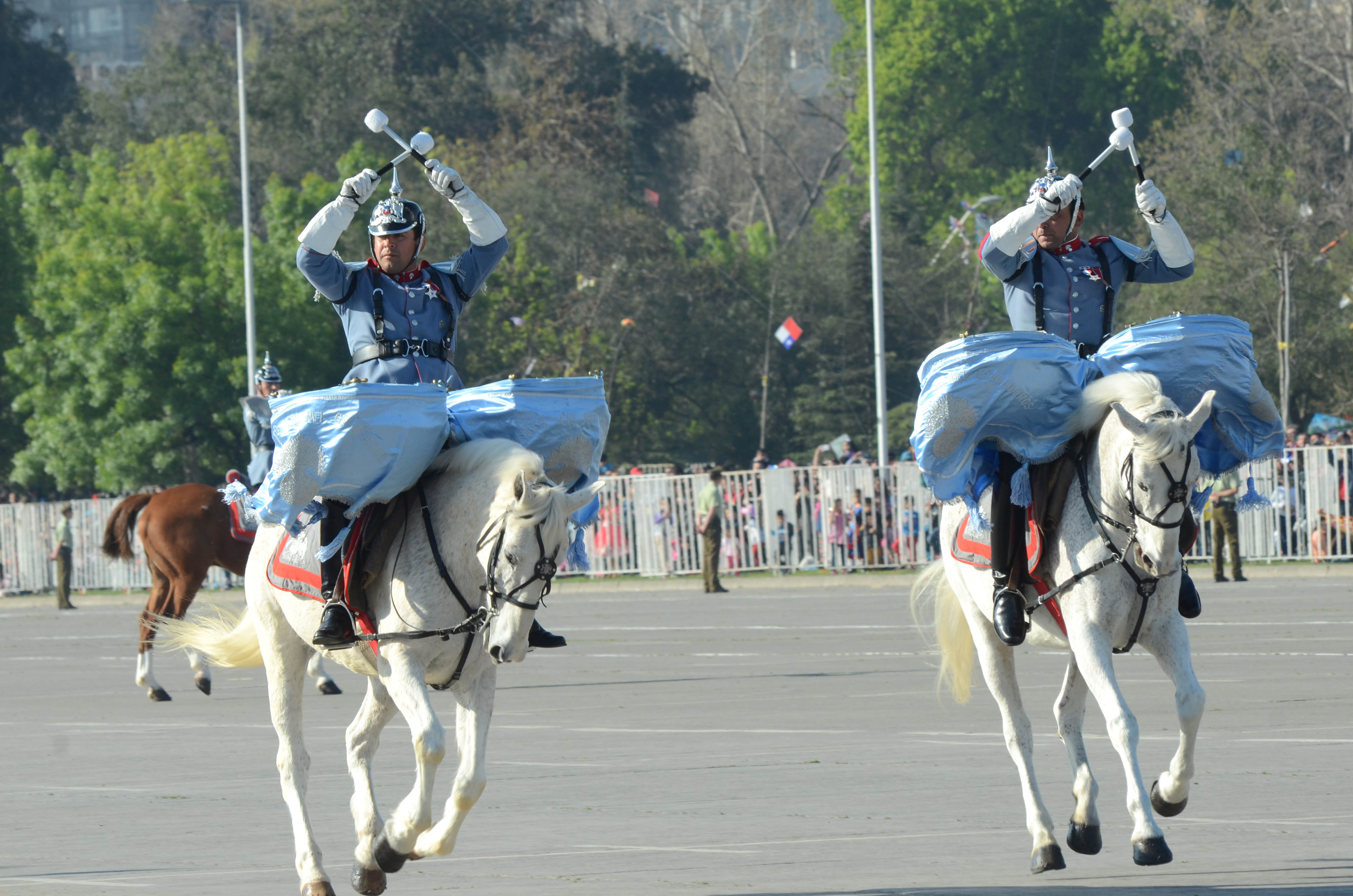
Kettledrummers of the regimental band.

Being the seniormost band of the cavalry and armoured regiments and squadrons of the Army and the inheritor of the long tradition of mounted bands in Chile since the 20th century the Regimental Band maintains a high standard of excellence and fitness as it performs both mounted and dismounted public duties within the Santiago Metropolitan Region while also playing in community events. Unlike the other mounted bands, but more similar to British and German mounted bands, it is a complete ensemble composed of brass and woodwind instrumentalists, together with a bugle platoon. In mounted formation the band is accompanied by two mounted kettledrummers playing in the old German tradition.

== Current dress uniform ==
The current full dress uniform of the regiment, adopted in 2011, is a modernized form of the old uniforms worn in the early 1900s. It is a sky blue uniform with a cavalry pickelhaube, with black riding boots and belt for all ranks and epaulettes for officers in the Prussian manner (but not shoulder marks, shoulder boards are worn by the warrant officers). Officer carry sabres while all troopers, including those of NCO rank save for warrant officers and the colour guards, carry lances when mounted and Mauser rifles when dismounted.
