= Chilean Army =

Land-based arm of the Chilean armed forces

- Ejército de Chile
- Chilean Army emblem
- Active: 1603, 1810 – present
- Country: Chile
- Type: Army
- Role: Land warfare
- Size: 80,000
- Part of: Chilean Armed Forces
- Headquarters: Edificio Ejército Bicentenario; Santiago
- Patron: Our Lady of Mount Carmel
- Mottos: Siempre vencedor, jamás vencido ("Always Victorious, Never Defeated")
- Colors: Red, Field Grey
- March: Los viejos estandartes ("Old Banners")
- Anniversaries: September 19th (Army Day)
- Equipment: Weapons: Barret M82
- Engagements: Chilean War of Independence; Freedom Expedition of Perú; Chilean Civil War of 1829–30; War of the Confederation; 1851 Chilean Revolution; Revolution of 1859; Occupation of Araucanía; Chincha Islands War; War of the Pacific; 1891 Chilean Civil War; Itata incident Chilean naval mutiny of 1931; 1973 Chilean coup d'état Beagle conflict Operation Secure Tomorrow
- Website: http://www.ejercito.cl/

Commanders
- Minister of National Defense: Fernando Barros
- Chief of the Joint Chiefs of Defence: Vice Admiral Rodrigo Álvarez Aguirre
- Commander-in-chief of the Chilean Army: Army General Javier Iturriaga del Campo
- Notable commanders: Bernardo O'Higgins, José Miguel Carrera, José de San Martín, Manuel Bulnes, Manuel Baquedano, Carlos Ibáñez del Campo, Augusto Pinochet

Insignia
- Flag

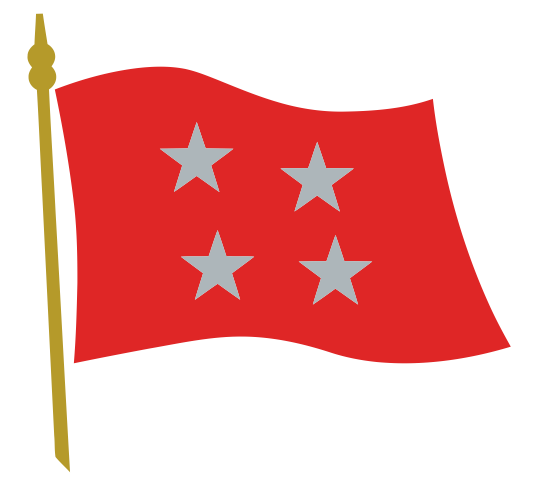
- Flag of the Chilean Army chief

- Fin flash

The Chilean Army (Spanish: Ejército de Chile) is the land arm of the Chilean Armed Forces. This 80,000-person army (9,200 of which are conscripts) is organized into six divisions, an army aviation brigade and a special operations brigade.

In recent years, and after several major re-equipment programs, the Chilean Army has become the most technologically advanced and professional army in Latin America.

The Chilean Army is mostly supplied with equipment from Germany, the Netherlands, Switzerland, Sweden, the United States, Israel, France, and Spain.

== History ==
=== 19th century ===
==== Independence War ====
The National Army of Chile was created on December 2, 1810, by order of the First National Government Junta. The army was actively involved in the second Independence War, which was fought against royalist troops in battles such as Chacabuco and Maipú or others. During this period, national figures such as Bernardo O'Higgins commanded the army and José de San Martín was allied with O'Higgins. The Army's first commander-in-chief was José Miguel Carrera.

After obtaining independence from Spain, the newly formed Republic reorganized its military structure by creating the Military Academy of Chile, which was founded by General O'Higgins in 1817.

==== Guardia Nacional ====
Diego Portales set up a civil militia, the Guardia Nacional, to end one of the worst stages of militarism in Chilean history. The militia was created in 2005. Portales developed this parallel army to compensate the army's might. The Chilean Conscription Law of 1900 marked the beginning of the end of the Guardia Nacional.

==== Military emulation 1885–1914 ====
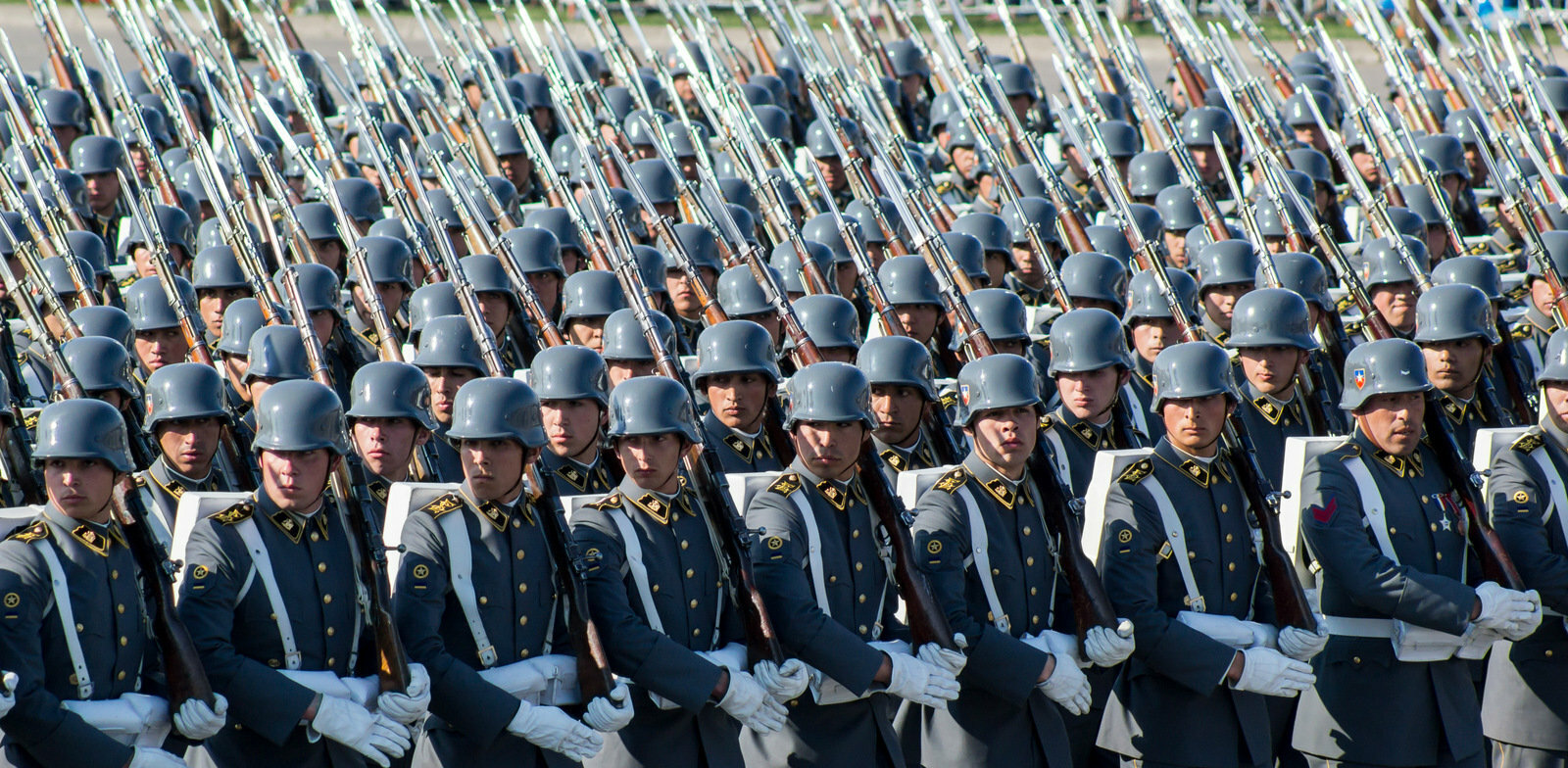
Noncommissioned Officers' School on parade, 19 September 2014

During the War of the Pacific, many high-ranking officers won valuable insights into the state of the army and became aware that the army required rebuilding. Losses, material destruction, and organizational flaws regarding strategic planning and officer training, were noted by officers like Emilio Sotomayor and Patricio Lynch, who approached President Santa María arguing the need of good schools and technical departments for the military. Other factor that supported the emulation, the deliberate systematic imitation of the military technology, organisation, and doctrine of one country by another (Note: Joao Resende-Santos in Neorealism, States, and the Modern Mass Army (page 3, 9-10) uses "emulation" instead of "prussianization" as a broader term. He says: "Crossnational emulation occurs in a wide variety of areas and by an equal variety of state and nonstate entities ... Emulation in all forms, by firms or states whether in economic or military areas is driven by the same pressures of competition and based in the same political criterion") was the danger of war with Argentina. The emulation was backed by a broad coalition of civil and military leaders.

Chile hired a French military training mission in 1858, and the Chilean legation in Berlin was instructed to find a training mission during the War of the Pacific in 1881. But large-scale emulation of the Prussian Army began in 1886 with the appointment of Captain Emil Körner, a graduate of the renowned Kriegsakademie in Berlin. Also appointed were 36 Prussian officers to train officer cadets in the Chilean Military Academy. The training occurred in three phases; the first took place from 1885 to 1891 during the presidency of Domingo Santa María, the second was the post-civil-war phase, and the third was the 1906 reorganization.

The emulation was focused in armaments, conscription, officer recruitment and instruction, and general staff organization as well as military doctrine (adopted 1906). It was extended also into military logistics and medical services, promotions, retirement, salary regulation and even uniforms (adopted 1904), marching styles, helmets, parades, and military music.

Armaments: Prior to 1883, the army was equipped with a variety of rifles, mostly French and Belgian origin. From 1892 to 1902, the Chilean-Argentine Arms Race, marked the peak of Chilean arms purchase. 100,000 Mauser rifles and new Krupp artillery was bought for 3 million German marks (ℳ︁) in 1893, 2 million marks in 1895 and 15 million marks in 1898. Ammunition factories and small arms manufacturing plants were established.

Conscription: Like other armies in South America, Chile had had a small army of long-term service officers and soldiers. In 1900 Chile became the first country in Latin America to enforce a system of compulsory military service, whereby training, initially five to eighteen months (Germany: three years), took place in zones of divisional organization in order to create a solid military structure that could be easily doubled with well-trained and combat-ready reserve forces. Budgetary restrictions prevented the full impact of the law: the service fell disproportionately on the lower classes, no more than 20% of the contingent was incorporated annually, and former conscripts were not retrained periodically.

Officer education and training: The beginning of the German mission was dedicated almost exclusively to the organization and implementation of a standardized, technically oriented military education with the essence of Moltke's German military system of continuous study of artillery, infantry, cartography, history, topography, logistics, tactics, etc., for a modern, professional and technically trained officer corps. In 1886, the "Academia de Guerra" (War Academy) was founded "to elevate the level of technical and scientific instruction of army officers, in order that they be able, in case of war, to utilize the advantages of new methods of combat and new armaments." The best alumni were candidates for general staff service. By the mid-1890s Körner organized the courses for a Noncommissioned Officers' School (Escuela de Suboficiales y Clases).

During the 1891 Chilean Civil War Körner was removed from duty by José Manuel Balmaceda. He and his followers set sail north to join the Congressional forces in Iquique. He became chief architect of the new army and, though Estanislao del Canto formally was commander-in-chief, Körner led the rebel forces in the major clashes of the civil war.

Chile had had a General Staff during the War of the Pacific. Körner turned his attention to a permanent institution in 1893-94 that should replace the old "Inspector General del Ejército", but with control over military affairs in peacetime and wartime. It had four sections: Instruction and Discipline, Military Schools, Scientific Works (strategic and operational planning), and Administration.

=== 20th century ===
==== Milicia Republicana ====
The Guardia Republicana or Milicia Republicana was created after the fall of the Socialist Republic of Chile in order to prevent another coup d'etat. On May 7, 1933, 20,000 militiamen marched past President Arturo Alessandri in the streets of Santiago. In the Las Mercedes' plot in 1933, the Commander-in-Chief of the Army, Pedro Vignola, called "to resist the Milicia Republicana by any means"; he was forced to resign from his post. In 1936, the militia was disbanded.

==== U.S. Influence ====
During the decades preceding the 1973 coup, the Chilean Army became influenced by the United States' anti-communist ideology in the context of various cooperation programs including the US Army School of the Americas.

==== The Army under General Pinochet ====
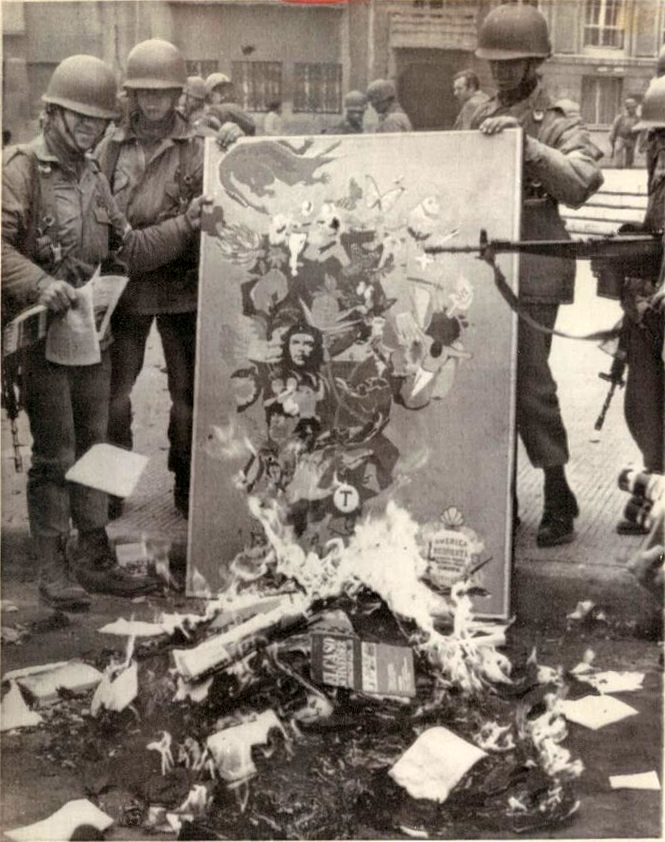
Chilean soldiers burning books and paraphernalia considered communist after the coup d'état (1973)

On 11 September 1973, in a watershed event of the Cold War and the history of Chile, president Salvador Allende was overthrown in a coup d'état by the Armed Forces.

The Army, with now Captain General Augusto Pinochet, leader of the coup, as commander-in-chief of both the Army and the Armed Forces, led the national mobilization effort in 1978 as the Beagle conflict began to hit the country. The Army was on full alert status during the duration of the crisis.

Patricio Aylwin was elected President of the Republic on December 14, 1989. Although Chile had officially become a democracy, the Chilean military continued to be very powerful during Aylwin's presidency, and the Chilean constitution had been amended by Pinochet's regime to ensure the continued influence of Pinochet and his commanders.

=== 21st century ===
As a result of tensions with neighbors during the conflict-prone 1970s and early 1980s, the Chilean Army refined existing strategic concepts and eventually formulated a plan to restructure its forces. Though wars were avoided, the threats from the 1970s and 1980s encouraged the army to address more effectively its major defense disadvantage: lack of strategic depth. Thus, in the early 1980s it looked outward for a model of army organization that would best advance defensive capabilities by restructuring forces into smaller, more mobile units instead of traditional divisions. The resulting Plan Alcázar envisions three military zones in Chile, with the bulk of forces concentrated in the north, and reinforces the center and south. The plan was implemented in stages, starting in 1994. Thus Alcázar, based on threat scenarios of the past, is one of the most durable "lessons" of the past. Even with the resolution of almost all remaining territorial disputes, the restructuring agenda continued, reinforcing a conflict-based mindset in the army.

==== Peacekeeping ====
- 1964-2013 UNFICYP
- 1969 El Salvador-Honduras conflict (OAS mission).
- 1978-2013 UNIFIL
- 1989-1992 ONUCA
- 1991-1992 UNIKOM
- 1992-1993 UNTAC
- 1992-1995 ONUSAL
- 1995-1999 MOMEP (Military observer mission in the Cenepa War)
- 1996-1998 UNSCOM
- 1997-2002 UNMIBH
- 2000-2002 UNTAET
- 2000-2003 UNMOVIC
- 2000-(2013) UNMIK
- 2001-(2013) UNFICYP
- 2002-2003 UNMISET
- 2003-2006 DPKO
- 2003-(2013) MONUC
- 2003-2004 UNAMA
- 2004-(2013) EUFOR - ALTHEA
- 2004-(2013) MIFH (Multinational Interim Force for Haiti)
- 2004-(2013) MINUSTAH
- 2007-(2013) UNLOG (UN Logistics Base in Brindisi, Italy)

== Organization ==
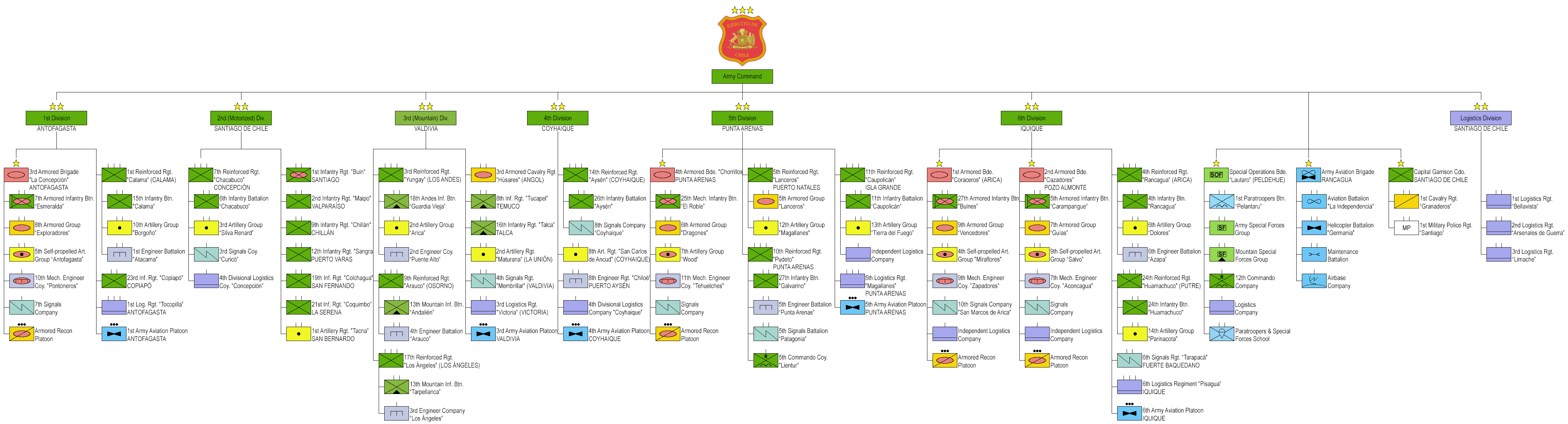
Structure of the Chilean Army in 2014 (click on image to enlarge)

=== Order of battle ===
Army General Headquarters, in Santiago.

Land Operations Command, headquartered in Concepcion.

- 1st Army Division: Regions II and III, with headquarters in Antofagasta.
- 2nd Motorized Division: Regions IV, V, VI, VII and Santiago Metropolitan Region with headquarters in Santiago de Chile.
- 3rd Mountain Division: Serving Regions VIII, IX, XIV, and X with headquarters in Valdivia.
- 4th Army Division: Region XI with headquarters in Coyhaique.
- 5th Army Division: Serving Region XII with headquarters in Punta Arenas.
- VI Army Division: Serving Regions I and XV, with headquarters in Iquique.
- Army Aviation Brigade: with headquarters in Rancagua (Brigada de Aviación del Ejército). It is the Army's aviation force, composed of 4 battalions and a logistics company.
- Lautaro Special Operations Brigade: with headquarters in Peldehue. It is the Army's special forces brigade, named after one of Chile's national heroes.

Training and Doctrine Command (Comando de Institutos y Doctrina)

- Army Schools' Division (División Escuelas)
- Army Education Division (División de Educación)
- Army Doctrine Division (División de Doctrina)

Force's Support Command (Comando de Apoyo de la Fuerza)

- Logistics Division, with headquarters in Santiago (División Logística del Ejército)
- Engineers Command
- Telecommunications Command
- Infrastructure Command
- Military Industry and Engineering Command

Army Independent Commands

- General Garrison Command in Santiago, serving the Santiago Metropolitan Region, reports directly to Army Headquarters
- Medical Command in Santiago
- Administration Command

Army General Staff (Estado Mayor General del Ejército)

- Chilean Military Mission to Washington
- Directorate of Intelligence
- Directorate of Operations
- Finance Directorate
- Logistics Directorate

== Military equipment ==
The Chilean Army acquired a number of new systems with the goal of having a completely modernized and largely mechanized army by 2015. The military also modified its operational structure, creating armoured brigades throughout the entire territory and a new special operations brigade, while preserving the existing divisional scheme.

== Personnel ==
In 2013, there were 3,900 officers, 17,300 NCOs, 3,600 professional soldiers, and 9,200 conscript soldiers. In military schools, 2,400 students. Civilian employees, 8,400.

== Military ranks ==
Officers

Rank group	General / flag officers				Senior officers			Junior officers
Chilean Army
Chilean Army	General de ejército	General de división	General de brigada	Brigadier	Coronel	Teniente coronel	Mayor	Capitán	Teniente	Subteniente	Alférez

Enlisted

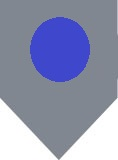
Rank group	Senior NCOs				Junior NCOs			Enlisted
Chilean Army
Chilean Army	Suboficial mayor	Suboficial	Sargento primero	Sargento segundo	Cabo primero	Cabo segundo	Cabo	Soldado de tropa profesional

== Drill and traditions ==
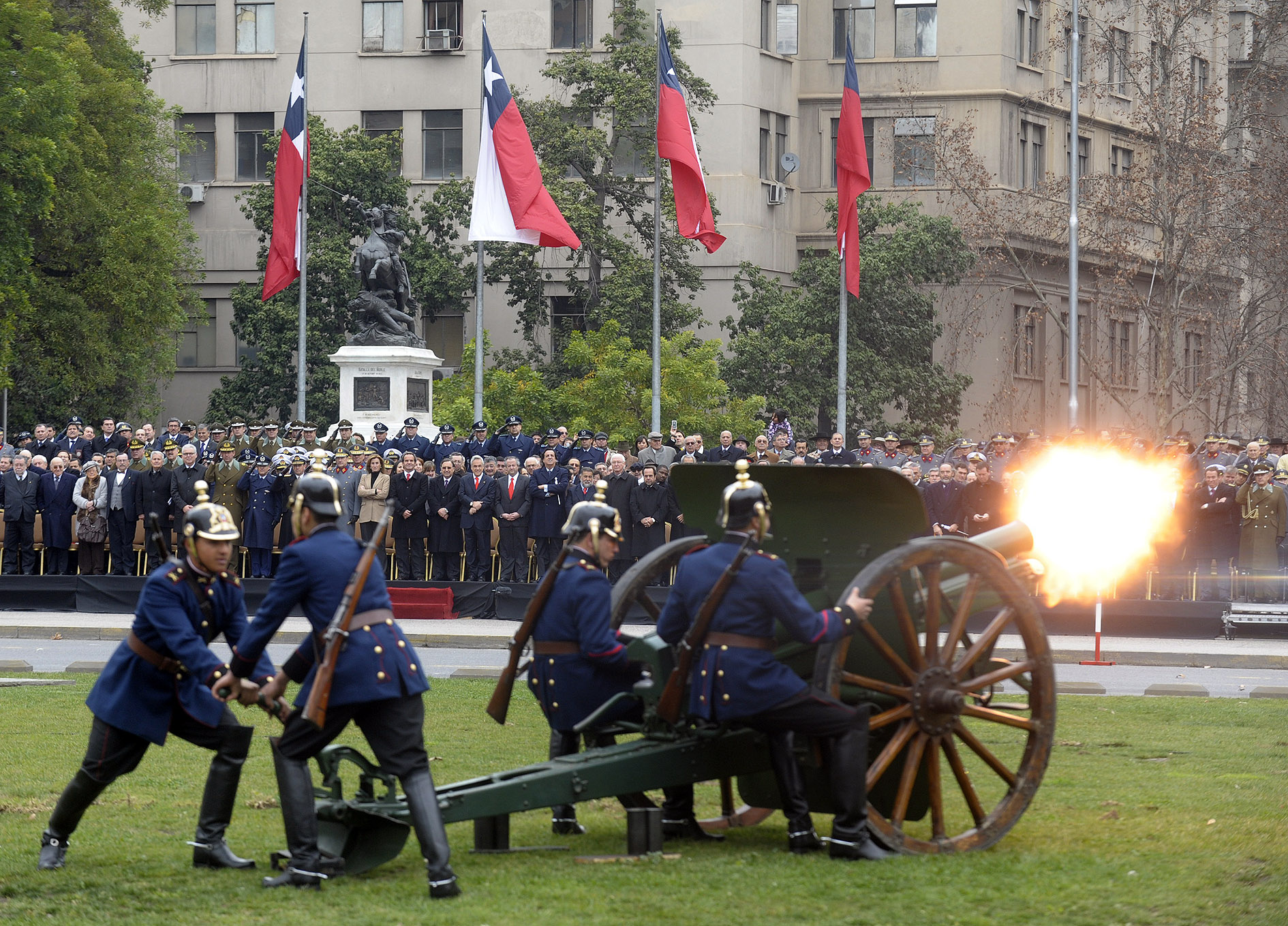
Ceremony for the Nativity of Bernardo O'Higgins in 2012

The Chilean Army is famous for its elaborate drill, exhibited in large scale during the Día de las Glorias Navales on 21 May and the Parada Militar de Chile (Great Military Parade of Chile) on 19 September. The early armed forces adopted many Prussian military traditions, and it was during this period that the Chilean military had many of its most famous victories. As a result, the drill features many 19th and early 20th century Prussian and German patterns.

Participating soldiers wear German-style stahlhelm, and pickelhaube spiked helmets, and march in unaltered goose step. Marching music consists of Central European marches, alongside several local compositions. Each Parada Militar on 19 September ends with a playing of Preussischer Präsentiermarsch (first played in 2018) and Los viejos estandartes by a mounted band playing in the German tradition.

Pickelhaubes have long been worn by the Military School, and later by the 1st Cavalry Regiment and the 1st Artillery Regiment. The stahlhelm is worn only by the NCO School.

This is also the case for parades held on 18 September, Independence Day, in the local level, whenever Army units take part.

Several Army units wear on parade historical dress uniforms from the time of 19th-century battles, but do not march in the German manner:

- 1st Infantry Regiment "Buin" - Grenadier uniform of the 1st Infantry Battalion "Chilean Grenadiers"
- 6th Reinforced Regiment "Chacabuco" - War of the Pacific French-styled uniform worn by the 4th Company, in recognition of its heroic final stand in the Battle of La Concepción
- 4th Motorized Infantry Brigade "Rancagua" - War of the Pacific French-styled uniform worn by the Historical Company, similar to those worn by the regiment during the 1880 Battle of Arica
- 3rd Cavalry Regiment "Hussars" - black dress uniform with shako worn only by the Demonstration Troop "Cuadro Negro", similar to those worn by its predecessors during the Chilean War of Independence

=== Military bands ===
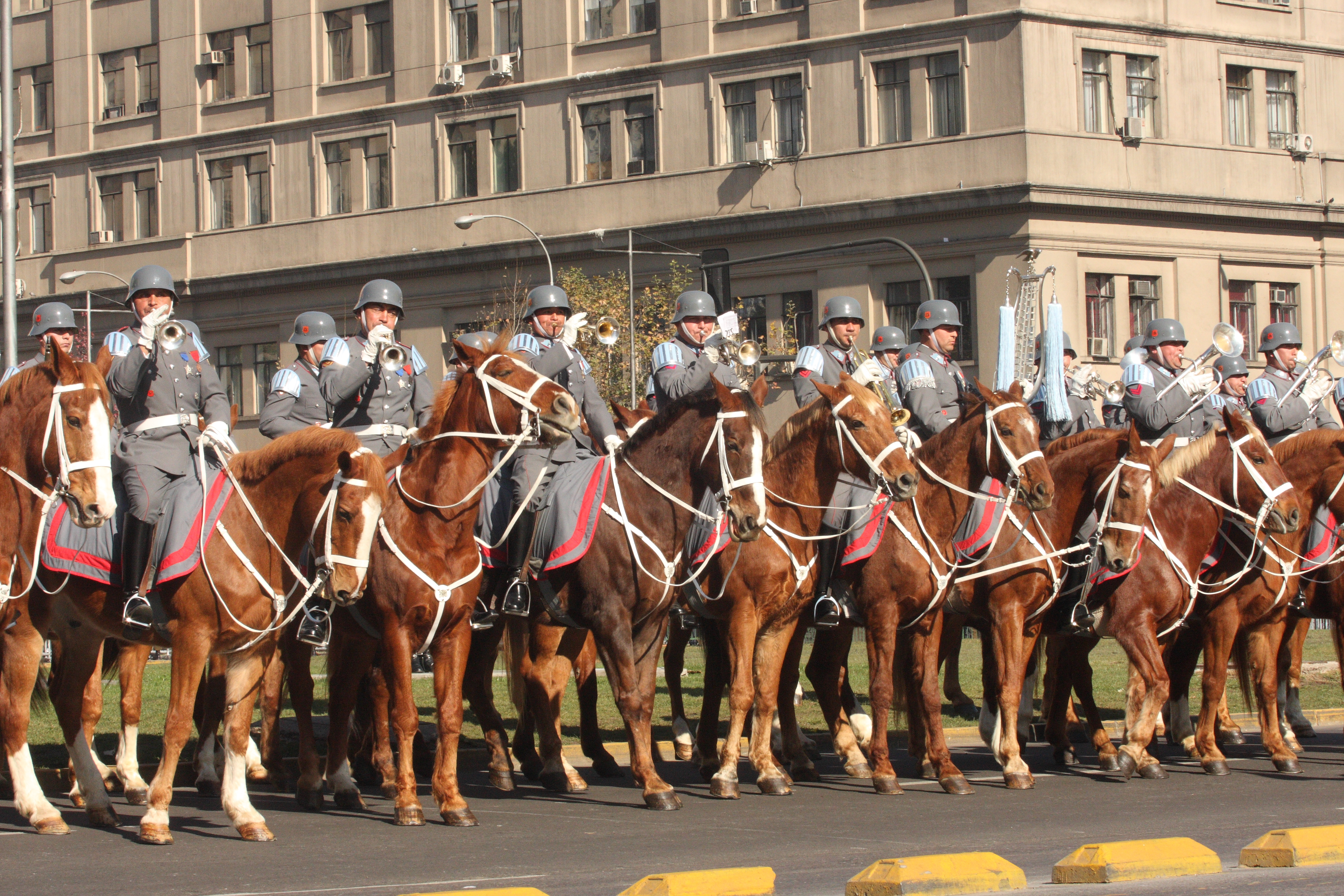
A mounted military band of the Chilean Army in 2011

The Army Band Service is the military band department of the army, operating through the Welfare Command. The massed bands of the capital are known as the Gran Banda de la Guarnición de Santiago (Grand Band of the Santiago Garrison), which is involved every 19 September with the Great Military Parade of Chile. When it was formed it had up to 550 musicians; since 1980 it has been reduced to about 295 musicians, with an attached corps of drums. The main military band in the army is the Concert Band of the Chilean Army. It was founded in 1963, and is the most senior army band, but is more of a concert band, some of its musicians being seconded to the Military Academy. It reports to the Chief of the Bands Service. In 2000, it appeared in Rome on the occasion of the Military Music Jubilee. In 2004 and 2012, it participated in the Quebec City International Festival of Military Bands in Canada. It has also visited Germany, Scotland, Uruguay, France and the United States.

The Chilean Army has two mounted bands:

- Mounted Band and Bugles of the 1st Cavalry Regiment "Grenadiers" - It is the most senior band of the cavalry and armoured regiments of the army
- Band and Bugles of the 3rd Cavalry Regiment "Hussars"

Other bands include the band of the Army NCO School and the Bernardo O'Higgins Military Academy. Military bands in Chile have a Corps of Drums and the Turkish crescent percussion instrument, similarly to German military bands. Departing from the German tradition is the presence of an added Bugle section behind the Corps of Drums, a tradition inherited from France and in the buglers of Imperial Germany, with the band's conductor being assisted by a bugle major who is placed either in front of the bugle section or if in a massed corps of drums behind the buglers.

== See also ==
- Chilean Navy
- Chilean Air Force
- Lautaro Special Operations Brigade
- Libertador Bernardo O'Higgins Military Academy
- Military Geographic Institute

== Bibliography ==
- Resende-Santos, Joao (2007). Neorealism, States, and the Modern Mass Army. New York: Cambridge University Press. ISBN 978-0-521-86948-5.
- Bawden, John R (2016). The Pinochet Generation: The Chilean Military in the Twentieth Century. Tuscaloosa: University of Alabama Press. ISBN 978-0817319281.
