= José Francisco Vergara =

Chilean politician (1833–1889)

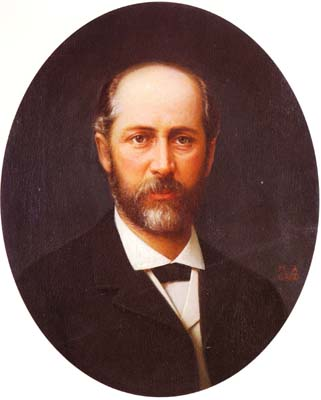

Senator of the Republic of Chile for the Coquimbo Province
- In office June 1, 1882 – June 1, 1888
- President: Domingo Santa María

Grand Master of the Grand Lodge of Chile
- In office 1881–1882
- Preceded by: Evaristo Soublette Buroz
- Succeeded by: Ramón Allende Padín

Minister of the Interior and Public Security of Chile
- In office September 18, 1881 – April 12, 1882
- President: Domingo Santa María
- Preceded by: Manuel Recabarren Rencoret
- Succeeded by: José Manuel Balmaceda

Minister of War and Navy of Chile
- In office July 15, 1880 – September 18, 1881
- President: Aníbal Pinto Garmendia
- Preceded by: Rafael Sotomayor Baeza
- Succeeded by: Carlos Castellón Larenas

Deputy of the Republic of Chile for Ancud
- In office June 1, 1882 – June 1, 1888

Personal details
- Born: José Francisco Vergara Echevers; December 4, 1833 Colina, Chacabuco, Chile
- Died: February 15, 1889 (aged 55) Viña del Mar, Valparaíso Province, Chile
- Party: Chilean Radical Party
- Education: University of Chile

Military service
- Allegiance: Chile
- Branch: Chilean Army
- Battles/wars: War of the Pacific: Tarapacá Campaign; Battle of Pampa Germania; Battle of San Francisco; Battle of Tarapacá; Lima Campaign; Battle of San Juan and Chorrillos; Battle of Miraflores; Occupation of Lima

José Francisco Vergara Echevers (1833-1889) was a Chilean politician, war hero, cavalry commander, presidential candidate, engineer and journalist who was notable for founding Viña del Mar as well as his several military campaigns of the War of the Pacific.

== Family ==
Echevers was the son of José María Vergara Albano, who was an assistant of Bernardo O'Higgins, reaching the rank of sergeant major in 1818 and later appointed mayor of Colchagua by Manuel Bulnes and Carmen Echevers y Cuevas.

He was also the grandson of José Francisco Martínez de Vergara y Rojas-Puebla, nephew of Pedro Nolasco Vergara Albano, cousin of Diego Vergara Correa, José Bonifacio Vergara Correa and uncle of the senators and deputies Ismael Valdés Vergara, Francisco Valdés Vergara and the literary critic and undersecretary of war and navy Pedro Nolasco Cruz Vergara.

He married on August 8, 1859, with Mercedes Alvares Prieto, granddaughter of Francisco Alvares and Dolores Pérez Flores. They had two children, Salvador married to Blanca Vicuña Subercaseaux; and Blanca married to Guillermo Errázuriz Urmeneta.

== Studies ==
He completed his primary studies in private and secondary schools at the National Institute. From December, 1852 to April, 1853 he was appointed Inspector of Internal of the institute. Later he entered the University of Chile, obtaining the title of surveyor engineer in 1859 at the age of 26.

== Foundation of Viña del Mar ==
In 1853, at the age of 20, he began to work on the train line that would link the city of Santiago and Valparaíso. During this work he met Mercedes Álvares Pérez, daughter of the owner of the Viña del Mar farm, whom he married on August 8, 1859.

On December 24, 1874, presented to the mayor of Valparaiso on the train project of the population of Viña del Mar and on 29 February 1875, the project was approved and the respective founding decree was issued. On 1875, Vergara donated the land for the construction of two schools, a chapel, a slaughterhouse and a hospital. The foundation of the city of Viña del Mar was in the lower part of the estate of the area, in which Vergara administered since the death of his in-laws in 1873.

On May 31, 1881, the decree gave rise to the Municipality of Viña del Mar, this decree was signed by President Aníbal Pinto Garmendia as he became a part of the council that elected Jose Francisco Vergara.

== Political career ==
=== Deputy and Senator ===
In his youth, Vergara joined the Radical Party of Chile, being elected deputy on May 30, 1879.

He was a member of the Club de la Reforma and elected Grand Master of the Grand Lodge of Chile in 1881 .In 1882 to 1886 he served as senator for the province of Coquimbo representing the Radical party. In the Senate, he accused the government of Domingo Santa María of committing corruption and abuse.

=== Minister of State ===
He was Minister of War and Navy of Aníbal Pinto Garmendia and Minister of the Interior of Domingo Santa María González of whom he succeed, but the president changed his opinion due to Vergara's opinions on electoral freedom and his helped nominate future president José Manuel Balmaceda.

Severo Perpenna was the name used by Vergara for Santa Maria as he reproached his authoritarianism and political derailments, with this pseudonym, Vergara published multiple articles in the newspaper La Libertad Electoral in 1886.

== War of the Pacific ==
Vergara was appointed by the President of Chile, Aníbal Pinto, to be secretary of the commander-in-chief of the Army, Justo Arteaga.

There were two positions that were represented, one by the Government of Pinto, at that time Minister Belisario Prats, and another by the Armed Forces, Navy and Army, represented by Admiral Juan Williams Rebolledo. The former thought that war had to be declared and on the same day, bomb the Peruvian fleet that was known to be undergoing repairs in Callao, thus leaving the road open to Lima. On second thought however, it was determined that Iquique was necessary to slow down by a blockade and then harass the people of Tarapaca, so that they could advance step by step to reach Lima in June.

Due to the head of the northern army, Justo Arteaga not accepting advice from anyone except his sons, Vergara spent his time studying the area and deducing a plan of operations. His plan was recognized by Domingo Santa María as the only reliable one. 357 He also warned Vergara to the government of lack of planning and decision making in the military command, i.e. Arteaga, what motivated the government to send Domingo Santa Maria north to analyze the situation and ensure the prompt mobilization of the Chilean Army.

Both the Minister of War, Rafael Sotomayor and his replacement, José Francisco Vergara, had to direct the course of operations considering the position of the uniformed men.

=== Disembarkation and capture of Pisagua ===
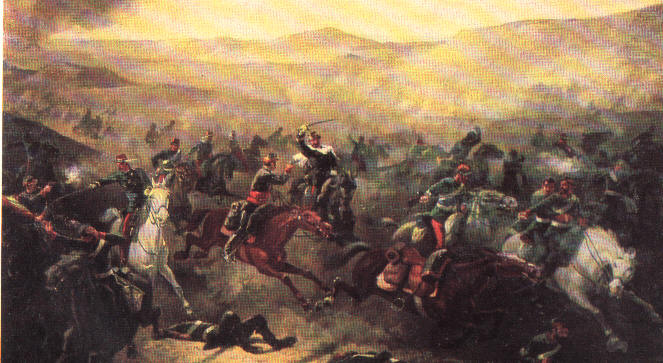
Vergara at the Battle of Pampa Germania.

J.F. Vergara was secretary to Minister Rafael Sotomayor and after the landing he offered to lead a force of explorers that had to reconnoitre the surroundings of the only railway line that ran from Pisagua to Agua Santa. The reconnaissance found food stores, fodder, wells and water pumps and locomotives in operation that allowed the disembarked army to survive the time necessary to establish the supply by its own means. During the exploration, his detachment defeated an allied cavalry column in the Battle of Pampa Germania. For his achievements, Vergara was appointed chief of the general staff of the force of 6,000 men stationed in Dolores.

On November 19, 1879, the Battle of San Francisco took place, in which Vergara imposed his strategic criteria on that of Colonel Emilio Sotomayor Baeza, brother of the Minister. This fact prevented a catastrophe for the Chilean forces, but produced a definitive rupture, which was about to be solved with the sword, between Vergara and Sotomayor. On November 27, 1879, the Battle of Tarapacá occurred which was a disaster for the Chilean army and the subsequent request of Minister Sotomayor to Vergara to embark on Chile for the responsibility, which according to the army and public opinion, concerned him. For that matter, Gonzalo Bulnes quote from a personal page Vergara: 8

Everything advised me to return and to terminate my military career and to make it in order I took cover with the Ordinance asking for permission to leave the service, which was not difficult for me to get.

From his own experience, he had known how difficult it is to achieve an ideal, even one of self-denial and sacrifice. He had taken up arms in his mature age, in the age of selfishness and calculation, to set an example of what can be done when deep and pure love of the Homeland is kept in his chest. Seven months later he returned taciturn and disconsolate as the vanquished of destiny, thinking about the insufficiency of human abilities that are not enough most times to help the vehement desire to do something useful, even if a tenacious will and a work carried out to achieve it is put. its extreme limits.

Thus I came to my country and my home in December 1879, considering my conceptions of patriotism and the moral sense of men as failed, and for always ending my public life that had begun so disastrously for my soul.

The press was not kind to me. Except for El Mercurio, La Patria and El Coquimbo, all the other newspapers gave me harsh denouncements when not vile slander. Wounded, but enduring like a Spartan so as not to reveal the pain of the sore, I spent a whole month busy with business and field work.

Vergara Echevers left immediately but stayed for a short time in Viña del Mar however, since according to what he tells his son Salvador, who was in Geneva, on January 26, 1880, that he is returning to the frontlines.

His view on how to conduct the war was pessimistic:

Our war is in complete repose. After the fierce combat in Tarapacá, there has not been a single important weapons event, because the excursion to Moquehua was an event without consequence. The offensive should have been taken a long time ago, but nothing is done, due to a lack of aptitude in the bosses and the inactivity that characterizes Minister Sotomayor, who still remains in his post. I am leaving for the Army on the 31st of this month, to take my post as Secretary General, bearing instructions from the Government and all its confidence regarding the operations to be undertaken.

=== Minister of War and Navy ===
After the sudden death of Rafael Sotomayor Baeza during the Tacna and Arica campaign, José Francisco Vergara assumed the position of Minister of War and Navy on July 15, 1880, unleashing a wave of indignation in the Army. Manuel Baquedano wrote to President Pinto:

The appointment of Don José F. Vergara as Minister of War has caused the effect of a bomb explosion on the Army and has profoundly disturbed the tranquility that we were enjoying.

He participated as representative of Chile in the failed Arica Conference in October 1880, which was to end the war.

Vergara organized the expedition to Lima from Arica. He installed a dock and on the day of departure he watched each and every movement. His gaze, a mixture of pride and satisfaction, saw the launch of the boats with the food, luggage, ammunition, fodder, etc., of the 8,800 men who would define the war. Hardly any other man could have carried out the occupation of Lima without having the multifaceted personality of Vergara.

In 1881 he participated in the Battle of San Juan and Chorrillos on January 13, the Battle of Miraflores on January 15 and finally in the Occupation of Lima on January 17.

== Death and legacy ==
Vergara returned to Viña del Mar having a hectic public life and also immersing himself in the personal care of its gardens. He died on 15 February 1889 while trimming some laurels while being remembered as symbol of a glorious historical figure. He was buried in Valparaíso, in the mausoleum of his wife's family in the cemetery number 1 of Cerro Panteón.

Diego Barros Arana describes him as:

It places him in the rank of the most illustrious sons of this Chilean homeland, to whose glory and whose prosperity he consecrated all the intelligence of a privileged head and all the integrity and all the activity of a great character. In life Vergara deserved the affection of his fellow citizens and will deserve in history the respect and applause of posterity.

Francisco Antonio Encina describes him as:

The most disconcerting note in Vergara's personality is the reconciliation of some characteristics that are always divorced even in the most gifted brains. His breadth of mind was simply astonishing, his aptitudes ranging from the clever businessman to the strategist, from the mathematician to the writer of powerful literary temperament, from the finest sensitivity to the most impetuous push of the will. And his was a true brain breadth, the antithesis of the charlatan, good for everything and good for nothing.
