= Irene Morales =

Chilean soldier

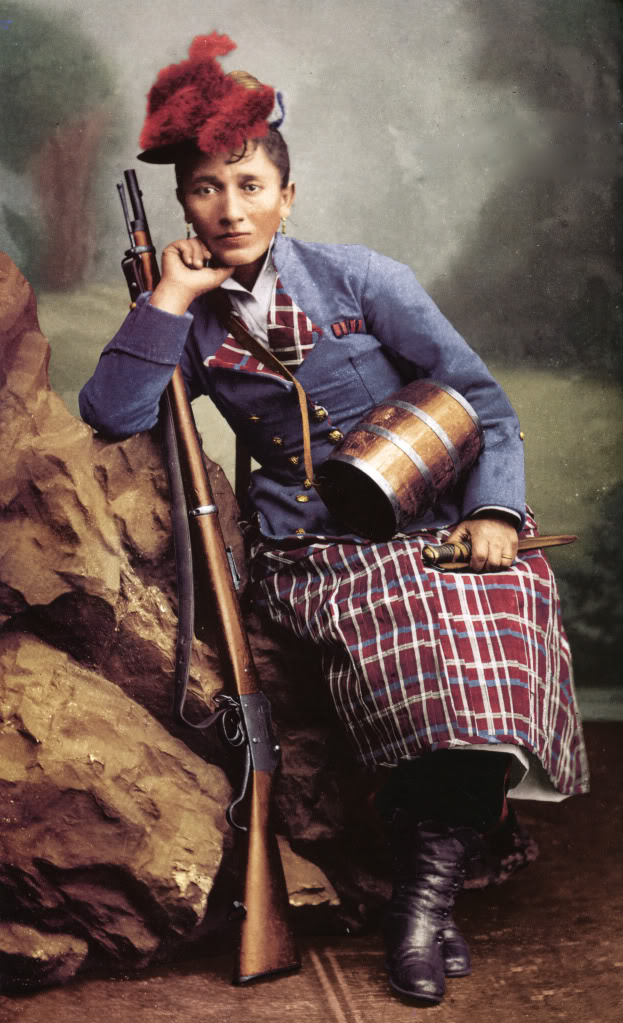
- Photograph by Eugenio Courret, 1881
- Born: Irene Morales Infante; 1 April 1865; Santiago, Chile
- Died: 25 August 1890 (aged 25); Santiago, Chile
- Burial place: Cementerio General de Santiago
- Spouse(s): ? (1877); Santiago Pizarro (1878)
- Military career
- Allegiance: Chile
- Branch: Chilean Army
- Service years: 1879–1883
- Rank: Sergeant
- Units: 3rd Regiment of the Line; 4th Division
- Conflicts: War of the Pacific; Battle of Pisagua; Battle of San Francisco; Battle of Tacna; Battle of Chorrillos; Battle of Miraflores

Irene Morales Infante (1 April 1865 – 25 August 1890) was a Chilean soldier who served in the War of the Pacific. She was born in a barrio of Santiago, and lived in poverty throughout her life, working as a seamstress from an early age. When the War of the Pacific began she was only 13 years old, and had been orphaned and twice widowed. Her second husband was executed by the Bolivian military for killing a soldier.

She fought alongside the troops of her unit in the battles of the Tarapacá Campaign in late 1879, at Pisagua and San Francisco. Her valor in these battles and her care for wounded comrades drew the attention of Chilean commander-in-chief Manuel Baquedano, who provided her with official recognition and the rank of a sergeant. She continued to serve in the army for the duration of the war and was famously courageous at the Battle of Tacna in 1880. After the war, she returned to civilian life and died in obscurity, aged only 25. Now considered one of Chile's greatest heroes of the war, her service only became widely known after her death.

== Early life ==
Morales was born on 1 April 1865 in La Chimba, a barrio on the Mapocho River in Santiago de Chile, the daughter of carpenter Ventura Morales and Marta Infante. Her father died when she was young, and she moved with her mother to Valparaíso. There she started to learn her mother's trade as a seamstress until her mother married her to an older man in 1877, at age 11. Her husband died during the first year of their marriage, and her mother died about the same time.

Left without any family, Morales headed for Antofagasta, then a port town in Bolivia that was booming due to the nitrate mines in the area. She travelled there as a steerage passenger, with a ticket she bought by selling nearly all of her possessions. While working there, she met Santiago Pizarro, a Chilean in his 30s who made his living in a Bolivian military band, and married him in mid-1878, aged 13. He was tried and executed on 21 September of that year for killing a Bolivian soldier in a drunken brawl. She found his body dumped by the side of the railway tracks and took a gold ring from his finger, which she wore for the rest of her life. Pizarro's execution was widely protested by the mostly Chilean population of Antofagasta, which resented what was seen as an unjust Bolivian government.

== Military service ==
On 14 February 1879, Chilean forces entered Antofagasta to the welcome of most of the local population, beginning the War of the Pacific against Bolivia and Peru. Many locals enlisted in the Chilean Army, and Morales enlisted as a soldier to avenge her husband by disguising herself as a man and slipping in unnoticed amid the frenzy of patriotism.

Her deception did not last long, for Capt. Hermógenes Cámus saw through her disguise immediately—because of her curved figure and "feminine beauty," he said. Nonetheless, he allowed her to be an unauthorised army cantinière and nurse. These were the only positions available to women in the army at the time, and many women effectively served as both, which Morales did. As a cantinière, she sold food and drink to supplement soldiers' monotonous basic rations, staying with them at their camp and marching with them on operations, and since she was a nurse, she had to be present immediately after battles to care for the wounded.

Morales was first sent to Cámus's unit, the 3rd Regiment of the Line, which was at the front of Chile's campaigns during much of the war. Although she officially was not a soldier and was not supposed to participate in combat, this did not deter her from fighting alongside the men of her regiment. Indeed, she was noted for her great skill with a rifle. She fought at the amphibious landing and fierce ensuing assault on a Peruvian position of the Battle of Pisagua on 2 November 1879 and at the Battle of San Francisco on 19 November. She was looked up to by the men of her unit for her selfless nursing of the wounded after battles. She also put herself at risk several times to save captured Peruvian soldiers from being abused by her compatriots.

Hearing of her deeds, the commander-in-chief of Chile's military, General Manuel Baquedano, summoned Morales to meet him and officially authorised her to wear the uniform of a cantinière (as she had done so without authorisation before) and gave her the rank and pay of a sergeant (sargento segundo, lit. "second sergeant"). She later moved to the 4th Division, in which she served during the Tacna and Arica Campaign. At the Battle of Tacna on 26 May 1880, she continued to provide water to the exhausted men at the front lines after she received a slight wound herself. She was one of the first soldiers to enter the city of Tacna that evening, and soldiers of the Carabineros de Yungay cavalry regiment recalled her riding into the town on a horse, raising her rifle as they passed by and crying "Viva Chile!". After the battle, she was stricken for some time with an illness she picked up from prisoners of war she had cared for, and she wrote a letter to a friend of hers in Antofagasta, assuming she was on her deathbed. Nonetheless, later writers said she was present at the Battle of Arica two weeks later and ordered the mass killing of captured Peruvians, an account also inscribed on a Peruvian memorial to the dead. During January 1881, she fought at the Battle of Chorillos and Battle of Miraflores and was among the Chileans who entered Lima after the city was captured.

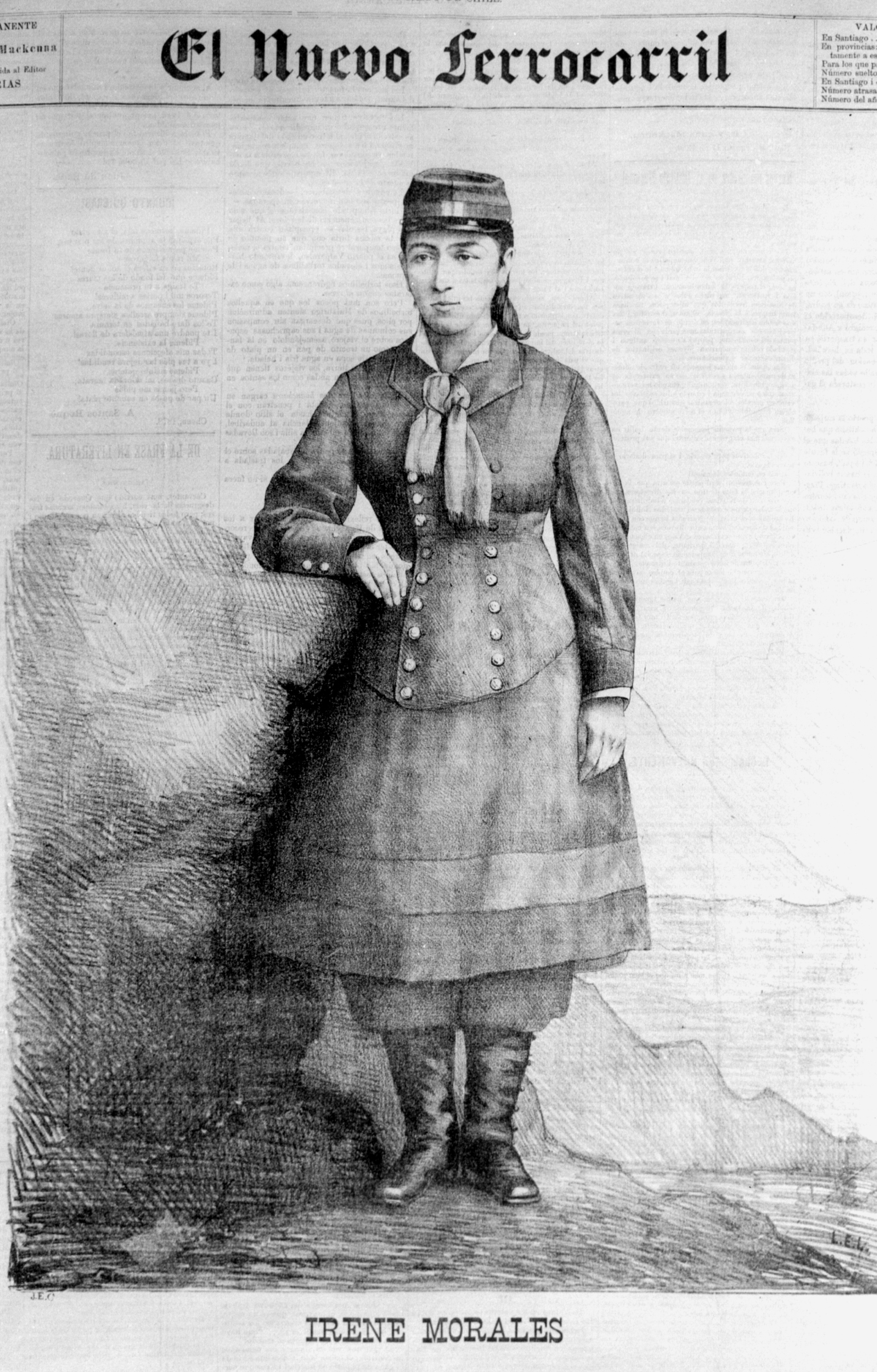
An engraving of Morales from Vicuña Mackenna's newspaper El Nuevo Ferrocarril (1881)

While all her contemporaries in Chile recognised her heroism, and the common soldiers she served with looked up to her as the "nun of charity," some men said Morales had gone too far for a woman by taking up a rifle. Benjamín Vicuña Mackenna praised her for her dedication and bravery and for her hatred for those who killed her husband, but in 1881 gave her the free advice that she should not put herself at such risk and should "return quietly to her poor home and restart the life of a real woman in manual labor, in caring for her relatives, in work with the needle and thimble, and exchange, after several years of adventures and passions, the revolver for her honored and beloved sewing machine." She did not follow this advice and remained in the army until the end of the war, fighting in the Battle of Huamachuco on 10 July 1883, the last battle of the war. Men like Mackenna were right to say she put herself at unusual risk for a woman at the time, for several other Chilean cantinières were killed after being captured by Peruvians during the war.

== Later life and legacy ==
After the end of the war, Morales returned to her birthplace of Santiago. While few knew of her actions during the war, the men she served alongside remembered her well. When she appeared at the unveiling of the monument to the common Chilean roto at the Plaza Yungay, she received some of the most enthusiastic applause. After years of illness, she died in anonymity in the common room of a Santiago hospital on 25 August 1890, aged only 25. For her, widespread recognition came only after her death.

On 25 August 1930, 40 years after her death, Col. Enrique Phillips wrote an article dedicated to her in El Mercurio that brought her into attention, in which he praised her in the highest terms, saying: "The Judiths of Chile were many in that glorious time, but none exceeded in valour Irene Morales, the paragon of Chilean women." In the years after her death, a number of poems were written on her, including one by Rómulo Larrañaga, and she was featured in many works of patriotic literature. A street near the Plaza Baquedano in Santiago is named in her honour, the Calle Irene Morales. During the turbulent years of the 1970s, she was among the historical Chilean women embraced as symbols by both conservative and left-wing women's political organisations. In modern times, she has been described as one of Chile's "greatest heroes" of the War of the Pacific. Her remains are kept in the Military Mausoleum at the Cementerio General de Santiago, which is maintained by the Chilean Army.

Morales is often compared to Candelaria Pérez, a Chilean cantinière of the earlier War of the Confederation who was also praised for her courage and who also came from La Chimba.
