= José Domingo Amunátegui =

Chilean general (1832–18887)

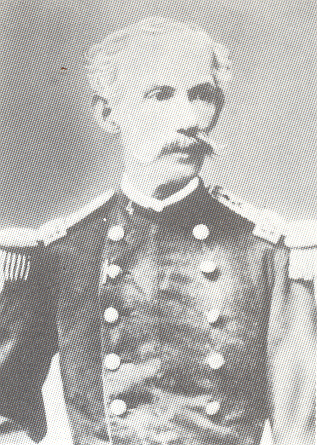
- Born: 1832; Chillán, Ñuble Region, Chile
- Died: 1887 (aged 54–55); Santiago, Santiago Metropolitan Region, Chile
- Military career
- Allegiance: Conservative Republic; Liberal Republic
- Branch: Chilean Army
- Service years: 1849 – 1887
- Rank: Brigadier General
- Conflicts: War of the Pacific: Tarapacá campaign; Battle of Pisagua; Battle of San Francisco; Lima campaign; Battle of San Juan and Chorrillos; Battle of Miraflores

José Domingo Amunátegui Borgoño (1832-1887) was a Chilean Brigadier General who participated across many battles of the War of the Pacific as well as a primary commander of the Lima campaign.

== Biography ==
Amunátegui began his military service by entering the Libertador Bernardo O'Higgins Military Academy and graduated in 1849. However he was then terminated of his service due to the Chilean Revolution of 1851 and wouldn't return into active service until 1861 where he was assigned to the 4th Line Infantry as a captain.

During the War of the Pacific, Amunátegui participarted in the battles of Pisagua, San Francisco, Tacna, San Juan and Chorrillos and Miraflores. He then founded the Military Circle for the cultural and social training of the military as well as the Director of the Chilean Army War Academy. In 1884, he was promoted to Brigadier General as well as an Inspector General of the Chilean Army.
