= Battle of Pampa Germania =

1879 cavalry battle of the War of the Pacific

- Part of the Tarapacá campaign of the War of the Pacific
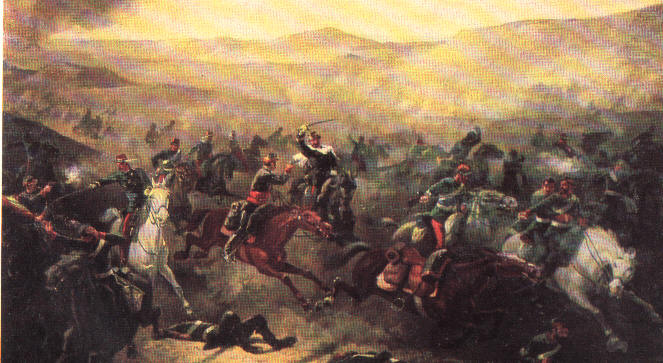
Date	November 6, 1879
Location	Tarapacá, Tarapacá Department, Peru
Result	Chilean victory

Belligerents
Chile	Peru; Bolivia

Commanders and leaders
José F. Vergara	José B. Sepúlveda †

Strength
181 Cavalry	90 Cavalry

Casualties and losses
3 killed 8 wounded	50 to 70 killed 5 captured

The Battle of Pampa Germania was a cavalry battle of the Tarapacá campaign of the War of the Pacific that took place on November 6, 1879. In this battle, the Chilean cavalry led by Lieutenant Colonel José Francisco Vergara and Sofanor Parra ambush and massacre the allied cavalry commanded by Peruvian Lieutenant Colonel José Buenaventura Sepúlveda who was in the rear of the allied army, which had already undertaken their march to Dolores, in the Pampa Germania sector, near Agua Santa.

== Background ==
=== Chilean perspective ===
The day after the Chilean landing in Pisagua, the Lieutenant Colonel of the Chilean National Guard Don José Francisco Vergara was sent, along with five officers to San Roberto, since there was news that an allied contingent of about 6,000 soldiers was concentrated there, but they returned without finding anything. Upon his return, Vergara suggested to General Erasmo Escala to carry out a major reconnaissance in the area, for which an exploration party was sent to the desert in order to verify the Allied withdrawal and establish security and water supply zones for the rest of the troops.

This party was commanded by Vergara himself, made up of a squad of the Horse Hunters Regiment, made up of 175 horsemen under the command of Captains Sofanor Parra and Manuel Barahona. Upon arriving at the Dolores station and finding its facilities intact, he reported his find to Escala, urging him to send troops to the site.

=== Allied perspective ===
Juan Buendía had ordered to gather the allied troops in Agua Santa after the Chilean landing, while he was heading towards Pozo Almonte. On that road there was a group of 90 Allied horsemen who had left Iquique on an exploration mission, the Allied horsemen did not have sabers but only carbines. This cavalry force belonged to the Hussars of Junín and Hussars of Bolivia regiments, commanded by Peruvian Lieutenant Colonel José Buenaventura Sepúlveda and Captain Manuel María Soto, respectively.

Sepúlveda ordered the troops to rest by setting up lookouts when they arrived in Germania at 3:45 p.m. on November 6. A short time later the sentries alerted of the proximity of a Chilean platoon that was outpost.

== The battle ==
Records from Chilean historiography recounts that both forces were arranged in line to charge and that when both collided, the Chilean cavalry, on higher mounts and in numerical superiority, broke the center of the allied forces, separating the Peruvian horsemen in a direction to the north and north while the Bolivians to the south. Once the allied contingent was divided, the Chileans set out in pursuit of the allies, almost wiping out the entire Allied force.

According to Vergara, around 50 to 70 allies were killed, including Commander Sepúlveda, and 5 prisoners were taken. The Chileans had a total of 11 casualties (1 sergeant and 2 soldiers killed; and 1 ensign, 1 corporal, and 6 wounded soldiers).
