= Battle of San Francisco =

1879 Chilean victory in the War of the Pacific

- Part of the War of the Pacific
Date	19 November 1879
Location	Cerro San Francisco, Tarapacá Departament, Peru (current Chile) 19°40′14″S 69°55′29″W
Result	Chilean victory

Belligerents
Chile	Peru; Bolivia

Commanders and leaders
(Chile) Emilio S. Baeza (Chile) José Amunátegui	(Peru) Juan Buendía (Bolivia) Carlos de Villegas

Units involved
3 regiments 4 battalions 2 artillery batteries	17 battalions 1 artillery battery 2 cavalry squadrons

Strength
6,500 soldiers 34 guns	9,063 soldiers 18 guns

Casualties and losses
60 killed 148 wounded	220 killed 76 wounded 1,500 missing 18 smoothbore guns lost
- Location within Chile Battle of San Francisco (South America) Battle of San Francisco (America)

The Battle of San Francisco, also known as the Battle of Dolores, was a major battle in the Tarapacá Campaign of the War of the Pacific, fought on November 19, 1879, in the Peruvian department of Tarapacá. A Chilean army under Colonel Emilio Sotomayor had moved via Dolores rail road deep into the desert and was encamped at San Francisco Saltpeter Office, about 30 kilometers south east of the port of Pisagua. Allied forces under General Juan Buendía launched an attack on Sotomayor's army. At the beginning, Bolivian General Carlos de Villegas pressed the attack over a poorly defended battery right in the Chilean centre and almost succeeded. Only the arrival of infantry support allowed Colonel José Domingo Amunátegui to hold the position.

The Allies also struck with the intention of driving the Chilean defenders away from Dolores well. Buendía hoped to defeat Sotomayor's army before the anticipated arrival of Gen. Erasmo Escala with reinforcements from Hospicio. The allied columns became confused during the fierce fighting, and Sotomayor's men rejected the attacks over its flanks and centre. Colonel Ladislao Espinar was mortally wounded at San Francisco, while Villegas was wounded and captured, among other allied officers.

The Allies were forced to retreat from the battlefield, ending their hopes of sending the Chileans back to the sea. Also, Buendía lost a huge amount of war materiel such as cannons, ammunition and weapons.

The catastrophe for the Allies was the result of poor logistics, inefficient leadership and the unexpected desertion of the Bolivian Army under the half-hearted command of President Hilarión Daza, known as the Camarones betrayal.

== Prelude ==
After the Chilean navy obtained a decisive victory at Angamos (October 8, 1879), the Chilean preparations for the invasion of the Tarapacá department began. On November 2, the Chileans launched an amphibious operation at Pisagua and pushed the Allies offshore, and established a beach head to transport equipment and soldiers. Also, the loss of Pisagua deprived Gen. Buendía of the only available escape route he had left, because Iquique was under blockade since the war broke out.

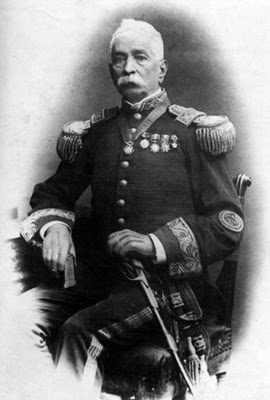
Juan Buendía, commander of the Peruvian army in the Tarapacá campaign

Buendía was in fact in a very dangerous position. He was obliged to retake Pisagua at all cost to re-open his line of communications. If not, his only way out of Tarapacá would be marching to Arica through the Atacama Desert. To make things worse, his troops were scattered all over the region. After defeated at Pisagua, Buendía retreated to Iquique where he joined Cáceres and Bustamante. Col. Pastor Dávila never moved from Pozo Almonte and Gen. Carlos de Villegas went to Puerto Patillo. Another two divisions were between Pozo Almonte and Iquique, while Villamil retreated to Agua Santa. The Aroma Battalion was at Mejillones and the Vengadores Battalion was at Agua Santa.

When the news of the Chilean victory reached Tacna, the Allies quickly held two war councils. In those, it was decided that Bolivian President General Hilarión Daza would drive his army to Tana, a few kilometers north of Pisagua, where he would join with Buendía and assume the command of the entire allied army. When reunited, Daza would attack Pisagua to regain the port.

Two gunned trains transported Daza's troops and supplies to Arica, from where the march started on November 6. To reach the rendezvous point of Tana, the Bolivians should walk about 150 kilometres across the most arid desert on Earth. Therefore, President Prado advised Daza to march at night to keep troops' welfare.

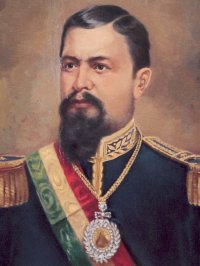
Hilarión Daza Groselle, President of Bolivia

But what Prado didn't know was that Daza wasn't sure of his troops' loyalty, so he deliberately wore down his army. The men marched in daylight across the desert and were allowed to bring wine with them. When Daza reached Camarones, he had already lost 200 men. Using this as excuse, Daza retreated to Arica without meeting with Buendía. This is known until this day as the Camarones Betrayal.

When Buendía was notified of the battle plan decided at Tacna, he began to reunite his army. He left Iquique on November 5 with three battalions and moved north east, deep into the Tarapacá Department. Buendía spent almost two weeks gathering his divisions, completing his army only by the 16, when he reached Agua Santa. The Allies marched to Negreiros on November 17, then turned north to Porvenir. From there Buendía would march to encounter Daza at Tana, passing through Santa Catalina. At 3 pm on November 19, the allied vanguard saw the Chilean army occupying San Francisco Hill.

On the Chilean side, right after Pisagua, Lt. Colonel José Francisco Vergara proposed an immediate reconnaissance for water supplies. With a cavalry detachment, Vergara rode on November 5 following the railroad to Dolores saltpeter office, finding the installations and water machines in good condition. The next day, the detachment resumed its mission, and in doing so annihilated two allied cavalry squadrons at Germania.

When Escala received Vergara's report, he sent 3,500 men under Col. José Domingo Amunátegui to Dolores on November 7. The next day, Col. Martiniano Urriola with another 2,500 soldiers followed as reinforcements. Both columns joined at Dolores on November 10 and seized the water well and the nearby saltpeter office. Col. Emilio Sotomayor, brother of War Minister Sotomayor, arrived to Dolores and assumed command of the troops. He also sent scouts to Jazpampa, Tana and Tiviliche looking for Daza.

A cavalry scout spotted the allied advance over Dolores at 6 pm on November 18, near Agua Santa. Immediately, Sotomayor sent Col. Amunátegui with a regiment, two cavalry companies and one battery to Santa Catalina, about 6 kilometers south of Dolores. Two hours later, Col. Juan Martinez' Atacama Battalion was dispatched as reinforcement. Simultaneously, Col. Ricardo Castro was ordered to return from Jazpampa, where he was sent with 1,800 men to wait for Daza's army. Castro left in place the Bulnes Battalion and returned to Dolores with Velasquez' artillery. Both Castro and Velasquez arrived on the 19th, when the allied army was already deploying in front of Sotomayor.

After his return from Tana, Lt. Col. Vergara spent great efforts in trying to convince Sotomayor to deploy the army over San Francisco Hill, instead of Santa Catalina. Vergara acknowledged the huge mistake Sotomayor was making, since the Chileans were outnumbered in a proportion of 2 to 3. The discussion became more and more violent between them, but finally about 1 am of November 19 Sotomayor gave and ordered Amunátegui to return from Santa Catalina.

While at Santa Catalina, Amunátegui's cavalry captured three Argentinean scouts who informed that the whole allied army was coming from Agua Santa. At the same time, Buendía was marching to Santa Catalina, a little more west from Amunátegui's position. But, the reconnaissance of both sides was very defective and the enemies weren't aware of each other.

Amunátegui reached Dolores at done of the 19, and the Allies arrived shortly after. Buendía's vanguard established around the water well at Porvenir, about 1.2 kilometers south of San Francisco Hill.

== Armies layout ==
=== Chilean battle plan and disposition ===
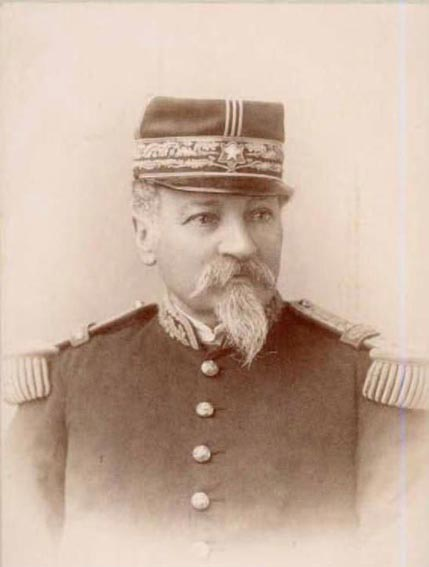
Emilio Sotomayor, commander of the Chilean forces at San Francisco.

The Chilean deployment centred on the twin hills of San Francisco, where the northernmost of them elevated about 300 metres, dominating the extension surrounding Santa Catalina, and to the east the space where runs the rail road from Pisagua to Agua Santa. These hills were accessible only from the south and the east, forming a natural bastion before the water well and the installations of Dolores. Amunátegui set there with the 4th Line Regt. and the Atacama and Coquimbo battalions, disposing Salvo's 63 artillerymen and their eight cannons, covering south and west, according to the battle evolution, plus another six piece battery and 2 Gatling machine guns of Sgt. Major Benjamin Montoya pointing east.

The Valparaíso and Navales battalions and the "Buin" 1st Line Regiment, under Urriola supported a six cannon battery directed by Capt. Roberto Wood and another six mountain cannons led by Capt. Eulogio Villareal. In consequence, the artillery could attack the plain over the west, south or south west, depending on the battle development, with no obstacles thanks to its elevation. The rough mountain zone over the rail road prevented any infantry incursion between San Francisco and La Encañada, so the Chilean camp over the double hill didn't fear of being attacked from its rearguard.

The station, the wind generators and the buildings of the mining company of Dolores were in the centre of the defence disposition, since Tres Clavos Hill, although less elevated than San Francisco Hill, was covered with four cannons, while 400 riders under Soto Aguilar were at west of La Encañada as reserve. San Bartolo Hill was defended by the 3rd Line Regiment, on the Chilean right wing.

=== Allied battle plan and disposition ===
Buendía's plan was to break the Chilean defence at Dolores, seizing the water wells and cutting the enemy's escape route. He would direct the offensive over Dolores with his right wing, while Cáceres and Suárez would onset the south west face of San Francisco hill with three divisions. On the left wing, the Bolivians under Pedro Villamil would attack the north-western edge of the hill, turning right to join at La Encañada with Buendía, who wanted to engulf the Chilean positions to take possession of Dolores. A little later, the Allied command knows that Daza has retreated to Tacna from Camarones.

General Buendía divided his 9,000 troops in three columns. In this plan, Buendía counted on Hilarión Daza's Bolivian troops, but the latter decided to return to Arica after a long and extenuating march.

The three columns were placed under the command of Belisario Suárez, Andrés Cáceres and Buendía himself. Suárez' column was formed by the Villamil, Bolognesi and Velarde divisions. These units were composed of the Cazadores de Cuzco Nº 5, Cazadores de la Guardia Nº 7, Ayacucho, Guardia de Arequipa, Aroma, Vengadores, Victoria and Colquechaca battalions. Buendía had under his command the Villegas, Bustamante and Davila divisions, formed by the Ayacucho Nº 3, Provisional de Lima Nº 3, Cerro de Pasco, Puno Nº 6, Lima Nº 8, Illimani, Olañeta, Paucarpata, Dalance battalions, besides two cavalry squadrons and a six cannon battery.

== The battle ==
At 1 pm, Sotomayor established his position. The Chilean army had now with 6,500 men and 34 cannons, thanks to Castro and Velázquez who joined in time and set between San Bartolo and Tres Clavos hills, behind the train station and the rail road in a way that could limit the access to Dolores from the plain. The Atacama and Coquimbo battalions reinforced the position at San Francisco. Buendía, notified of these reinforcements was eager to attack immediately. The soldiers prepared for battle but Suárez claimed for a delay, pointing out that the troops were exhausted and hungry. Buendía agreed and issued a countermand, making his men to return to previous positions.

All this movement and agitation confused the Chileans, who couldn't decipher what was going on in the Allied army. Therefore, when Salvo saw an incoming scout mission sent earlier by Suárez, he thought it was an attack and fired a warning shot upon them. Some units from Cáceres and Suárez divisions rushed to aid their companions, believing that this was the battle signal; and assaulted Salvo's position in disarray. Despite the officers efforts, the battle started.

=== Actions at the center ===
The Allies immediately set their plan in motion. Villegas began the attack with four companies in guerrilla formation under Col. Ladislao Espinar, followed by the rest of the Ayacucho, Puno, Illimani and Olañeta battalions. These companies advanced over San Francisco Hill and reached its bottom. Here the soldiers were out of Salvo's fire range, and organized. Another company of the Dalence Battalion came to support the attack too. Having arranged his men, Espinar began to climb the slope. Villegas pressed the attack sending Bermúdez's Lima Nº 8 Regiment into the fray.

Incredibly, Salvo wasn't supported by infantry, and got heavily outnumbered in short time. Thus, his 63 men were arranged in front of their cannons and fired upon Espinar's men with their Winchester carbines. The gunners barely contained the attack long enough to receive reinforcements.

When warned, Col. Juan Martínez sent two companies of his Atacama Battalion under Captain Cruz Daniel Ramírez to aid Salvo. Ramirez' companies managed to push back the Allies. Espinar was killed about 40 paces from Salvo's cannons, where his body was found after the battle.

Col. Lavadenz with the rest of his Dalence Battalion reinforced the position and resumed the assault. However, Ramírez was reinforced as well with some troops from the Coquimbo Battalion and rejected this new attack. Besides, the Allied reserve fired upon the Chileans without leaving its position, shooting their comrades in the back.

Strengthened once more, the Allies climbed the hill slope again, but now the rest of the Atacama Battalion was in place. The ensuing clash was brutal. Literally, a mass of men from both sides rolled down the slope stabbing and bayoneting each other. The Chileans crushed several allied companies and finally bayoneted off Villegas' column from the hill. The allied officers tried to contain the retreat, but half of the allied right flank withdrew, as the soldiers fled in all directions across the Pampa del Tamarugal, taking their reserve along with them.

Amunátegui managed to hold the cannons, but at high cost: 30 gunners, 82 soldiers and 7 officers were dead or wounded. This action proved decisive for the battle outcome. Had Villegas had taken Salvo's battery, the Allies would have turned around the cannons and destroyed the Chilean centre, breaking Sotomayor's front in half.

=== Flank combats ===
Meanwhile, Buendía took his column to Dolores well, where he was received by heavy artillery fire from Frías', Montoya's and Carvallo's batteries. Despite the barrage, Buendía rallied his lines and stubbornly continued his advance, until he entered into the 3rd Line Regiment's fire range of Col. Ricardo Castro. Castro's infantry received Buendía with an intense firing, which forced back the Peruvians, this time definitively.

Villamil took under him Suárez' left wing and moved to La Encañada to face Urriola. His column met fire from Wood's and Villareal's batteries, which dissuaded the Allies from coming any closer. Villamil was shelled twice and his soldiers fled from the field. The rest of Suárez' group, Bolognesi's and Velarde's divisions, attacked the 4th Line Regiment and the bulk of the Coquimbo Battalion, Amunátegui's right and centre. Both divisions were received with dense infantry fire and forced to seek refuge in ditches on the floor. So, Suárez was annulled from the rest of the battle.

The sum of failures finally broke the Allies' morale and the soldiers disbanded in all directions about 5 pm. The cavalry saw the retreat of Buendía and fled, without covering the retreat as it was supposed to. Suárez' and Cáceres' divisions retired in order and formed a small group of soldiers from Buendía's and Villamil's columns.

About 4,500 men retired in order to Tarapacá. The Chileans didn't pursuit, believing that the real fight would take place next day.

== Aftermath ==
The Chileans lost 208 men killed and wounded, while the Allies had 296 casualties and 1,500 missing. The defeat was a very rough blow for the Peruvian Army Southern Command, adding the effect of Daza's withdrawal on the troops morale, specially the Bolivians.

After the battle, the remaining troops marched to Tarapacá.

== Bibliography ==
- Machuca, Francisco (1926). Las cuatro campañas de la Guerra del Pacífico. Imprenta Victoria, Valparaíso.
- Reyno Gutiérrez, Manuel; Gómez Ehrmann, Sergio; Guerrero Yoacham, Cristián (1985). Historia del Ejército de Chile, Vol. V. Estado Mayor General del Ejército de Chile.
- Querejazu Calvo, Roberto (1992). Guano, salitre, sangre. Historia del la Guerra del Pacífico. Librería Editorial Juventud, La Paz.
- Cluny, Claude Michel (2008). Atacama, Ensayo sobre la guerra del Pacífico, 1879 - 1883. Fondo de Cultura Económica. ISBN 978-968-16-7982-8.
