= José Buenaventura Sepúlveda =

Peruvian Army officer (1848–1879)

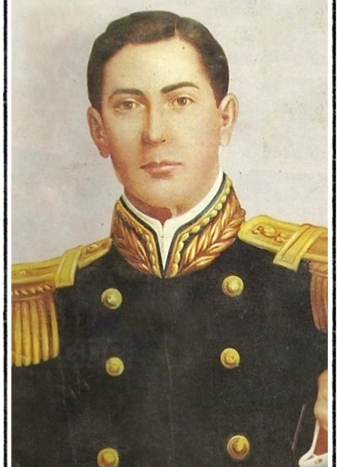
- Born: July 14, 1848; Hacienda de la Huaca, Cañete, Peru
- Died: November 6, 1879 (aged 31); Tarapacá, Tarapacá Department, Peru
- Military career
- Allegiance: Peru
- Branch: Peruvian Army
- Service years: 1870 – 1879
- Rank: Lieutenant Colonel
- Conflicts: War of the Pacific: Tarapacá campaign; Battle of Pampa Germania †

José Buenaventura Sepúlveda Fernández (1848-1879) was a Peruvian Lieutenant Colonel that served the War of the Pacific and was notable for his service at the Battle of Pampa Germania, in which he was killed at the aforementioned battle.

== Biography ==
José Buenaventura Sepúlveda Fernández was born in the Hacienda de la Huaca, Cañete Province, on July 14, 1848 . He was the son of José Antonio Sepúlveda Aldea who was a Chilean captain of the Colchagua battalion of the United Restoration Army of Peru and Lady Teresa Fernández.

At the age of 22 he entered the Military Academy, opting for the cavalry. In 1879 he was a lieutenant colonel in the Hussars of Junín regiment, commanding a squad of the same and another of Húsares de Bolívar, he left Iquique upon having news of the capture of the port of Pisagua by the Chilean army, following the orders of General Juan Buendía was in charge of covering the Allied retreat, the troop under his command being surprised and defeated by the Chilean cavalry under the command of Colonel José Francisco Vergara in the combat fought in the vicinity of the Germania nitrate office on November 6, 1879, in the which was killed in combat.

The 113th armored cavalry regiment stationed in the city of Tacna bears his name in his honor.
