= Alejandro Serani =

Chilean lawyer and politician (1901–1982)

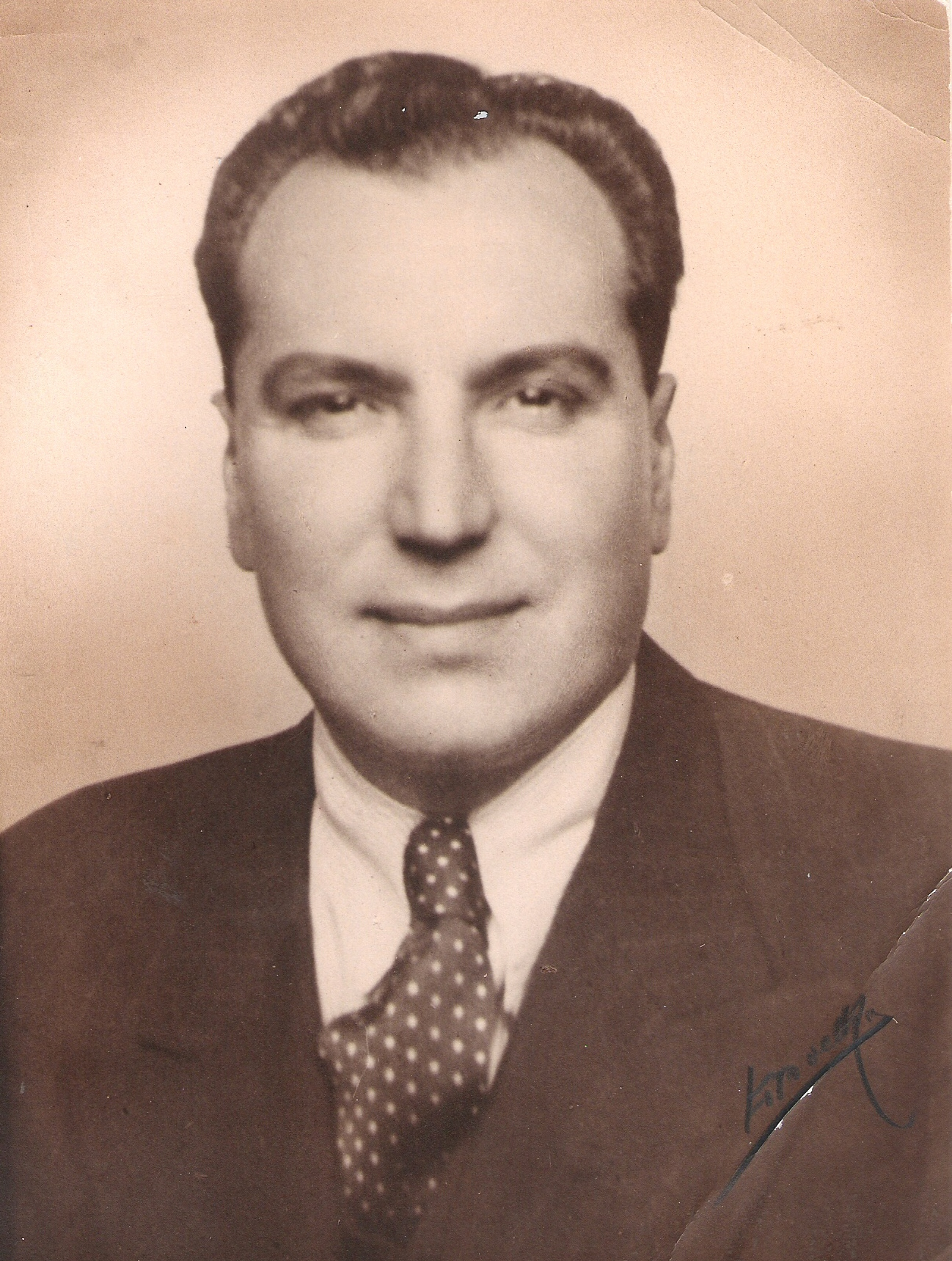

Minister of Labour
- In office 19 April 1934 – 31 March 1936

Minister of National Assets
- In office 31 March 1936 – 15 January 1937

Minister of Justice
- In office 24 March 1937 – 6 August 1937

Minister of Labour
- In office 8 August 1950 – 29 July 1952

Deputy of Chile
- In office 1933–1937
- Constituency: 19th Departmental Group (Angol, Laja, Mulchén)

Personal details
- Born: Alejandro Serani Burgos; May 3, 1901 Antuco, Chile
- Died: March 23, 1982 (aged 80) Santiago, Chile
- Party: Democratic Party; previously Democrat Party
- Children: 5
- Education: University of Chile
- Profession: Lawyer, politician, professor

Alejandro Serani Burgos (3 May 1901 – 23 March 1982) was a Chilean lawyer and politician. He served as an intendant, deputy and minister of state during the administrations of Presidents Arturo Alessandri and Gabriel González Videla. He was also a Freemason, serving as Grand Master of the Grand Lodge of Chile from 1954 to 1957.

== Biography ==
Serani was born in Antuco on 3 May 1901, the son of Ceferino Serani Di Cocco and Magdalena Burgos Binet. He completed secondary studies at the Liceo de Hombres de Temuco and higher education at the Pedagogical Institute and the Law School of the University of Chile. He graduated as a mathematics teacher in 1924 and received his law degree on 20 November 1928; his thesis addressed theories of criminal investigation.

During his student years he held leadership roles in the law and pedagogy student centres and served on the board of the FECh. He later taught at the state secondary schools of Los Andes and San Felipe, was vice-rector of the Night Liceo Federico Hansen, and rector of the Liceos of Rengo and Los Ángeles.

He married Marta Martelli Devia (three children: César, Mario, Patricio). Widowed, he married Guilda Mostazal González in Santiago on 18 June 1962 (two children: Nancy, Jorge Alejandro).

== Political career ==
Serani was active in the historic Democrat Party and later in the Democratic Party; both currents underwent splits and mergers during the 1930s–1940s.

During Carlos Dávila’s provisional government, he was appointed intendant of Biobío Province on 30 June 1932, resigning the following month. In the 1932 parliamentary election he was elected deputy for the 19th Departmental Group (1933–1937); he left the seat upon entering the cabinet and was replaced by Pedro Freeman on 25 June 1934.

Under President Arturo Alessandri he served as:

- Minister of Labour (19 April 1934 – 31 March 1936), including presiding sessions linked to the International Labour Conference held in Santiago in early 1936.
- Minister of National Assets (31 March 1936 – 15 January 1937),
- Minister of Justice (24 March 1937 – 6 August 1937).

Under President Gabriel González Videla he returned as Minister of Labour from 8 August 1950 to 29 July 1952.

== Later activities ==
On 5 May 1956 Serani was appointed professor of civil law at the University of Chile Law School, a post he held until 1982. He was a member of the General Council of the Chilean Bar Association. He also worked as a forestry entrepreneur, purchasing the “El Trapiche” estate near Coipue (Curepto) in the early 1950s, and owned the newspaper El Ideal of Mulchén.

A Freemason since 1925, Serani served as Grand Master of the Grand Lodge of Chile (4 June 1954 – 17 June 1957). During his tenure the 1955 Masonic Constitution was promulgated and Decree No. 318 (1955) established the Instruction Program for the three symbolic degrees.

Serani received the Order of Isabella the Catholic. He died in Santiago on 23 March 1982.
