= Francisco Gana Castro =

Former Minister of War and Navy of Chile

Justo Arteaga Cuevas
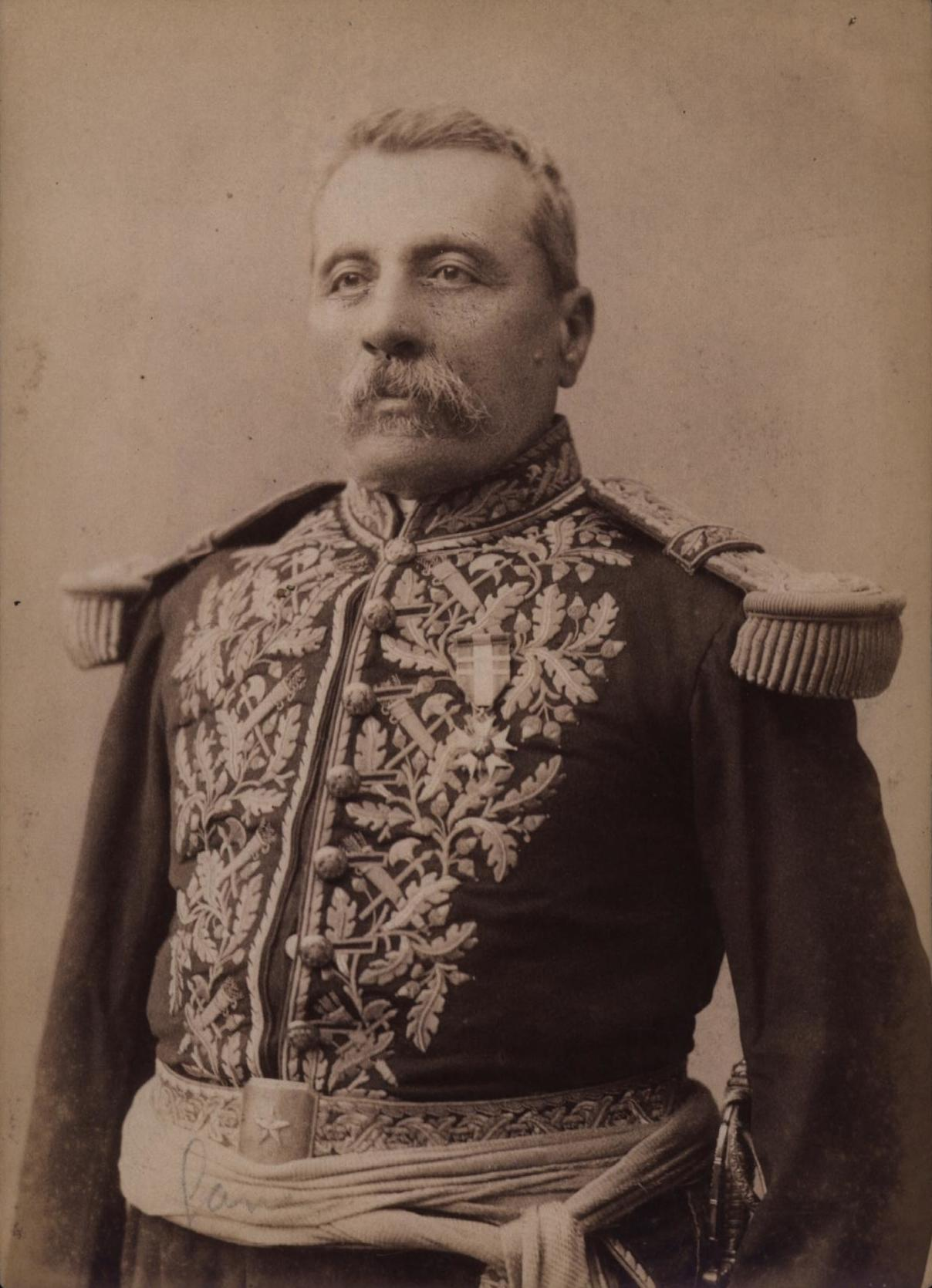

Minister of National Defense
- In office October 15, 1890 – March 29, 1891
- President: José Manuel Balmaceda
- Preceded by: Federico Errázuriz Echaurren
- Succeeded by: José Velásquez Bórquez

Commander-in-Chief of the Chilean Army
- In office August 22, 1888 – September 4, 1891
- Preceded by: Emilio Sotomayor Baeza
- Succeeded by: Marco Aurelio Arriagada

Personal details
- Born: February 19, 1828 Talca, Maule Region, Chile
- Died: August 7, 1894 (aged 66) Barcelona, Catalonia, Spain
- Education: Libertador Bernardo O'Higgins Military Academy

Military service
- Allegiance: July Monarchy; Second French Republic; Conservative Republic; Liberal Republic
- Branch: French Army; Chilean Army
- Years of service: 1843 – 1891
- Rank: Divisional General
- Battles/wars: War of the Pacific: Lima campaign; Battle of San Juan and Chorrillos; Chilean Civil War of 1891

José Francisco Gana Castro (February 19, 1828 - August 7, 1894) was the Chilean Minister of Defense from October 15, 1890, to March 29, 1891, as well as the Commander-in-Chief of the Chilean Army from August 22, 1888, to September 4, 1891, and was a notable participant of the War of the Pacific before being exiled to Spain after the defeat of the Balmaceda Government. He was also one of the founders of the Mulchén throughout the planning of the foundations of the city.

== Biography ==
Castro was born on February 19, 1828, as the son of Rafael Gana López and Benigna Castro Cruz. At the age of 15, he entered the Libertador Bernardo O'Higgins Military Academy before going to study military engineering at France at the Metz Military School in 1843. He also married Carmen Vicuña Cañas around 1838.

After graduating, he became a member of the French Army as artillery lieutenant until 1850 where he moved to the United Kingdom before returning to Chile in 1852. He was promoted to captain in 1854 and to sergeant major in 1859. He was then made lieutenant colonel of engineers in 1867 and was made chief of staff of the Army of Arauco. From 1870 to 1871, he was commander of the Army of Araucanía as well as laying out the foundations for the city of Mulchén. In 1878, he was one of the main advocates for the use of Armstrong guns with the next year having him commanding the Army of Valparaíso during the War of the Pacific and participating in the Battle of San Juan and Chorrillos. After Lima was occupied, Gana was made Chief of Callao as well as Commander-in-Chief of the Tarapacá Division. Due to his services, he was promoted to Brigadier General in 1882.

In 1884 Castro was appointed General Commander of Arms of Santiago and was an Inspector General of the National Guard. On October 15, he assumes as Minister of National Defense, a position he held until May 20, 1891, around the same time that he assumed the Command in Chief of the Army from January 12, 1891. During the Chilean Civil War of 1891, he supported the Government of José Manuel Balmaceda but were decisively defeated at the Battle of Placilla on August 28, 1891. This caused all supporters of Balmaceda's government exiled and General Gana took refuge in the United States embassy at Santiago before going into exile in Barcelona where he remained until his death on August 7, 1894. His corpse was then recovered and given a burial at the Santiago General Cemetery on November 25, 1894.
