= Tarapacá campaign =

1879 stage of the War of the Pacific

- Part of the War of the Pacific
- Movements and battles of the Tarapacá campaign.
| Date | November – December 1879 |
| Location | Tarapacá, Peru (present-day Chile) |
| Result | Chilean victory: Chile obtains control of the Tarapacá Department. |

Belligerents
| Chile | Peru; Bolivia |

Commanders and leaders
| (Chile) Erasmo Escala; José Vergara; (Chile) Emilio Baeza; (Chile) Ricardo Vargas (POW); (Chile) Eleuterio Ramírez †; (Chile) Luis Artega †; (Chile) José Amunátegui | (Peru) Juan Buendía; (Peru) Francisco Bolognesi; José Sepúlveda †; (Bolivia) Carlos de Villegas |

Strength
| 8,890 men 34 guns | 9,063 men 18 guns |

Casualties and losses
| Total: 1,273; 519 killed 680 wounded 66 captured 8 guns captured | Total: 2,642–2,662; 606–626 killed 437 wounded 5 captured 1,576 missing 18 guns lost |

The Tarapacá campaign was a short stage of the War of the Pacific in the last months of 1879, after the Chileans won definitive naval superiority at Angamos. It took its name from the region where it was fought.

After Angamos, the Chilean government began the preparations for an invasion of the Tarapacá Department, a Peruvian territory rich in nitrates and whose exploitation quarrel began the war. In its favour, Chile had the advantage of mobility, since the Allies could only move supplies and troops by land. Along this campaign both armies had to endure the difficulties of fighting across the desert.

For the Chileans, the goal of the Tarapacá campaign was to secure the department and to hold it as ransom until war reparations were paid once the war ended.

== Background ==
Following the outbreak of war in April 1879, both sides focused on gaining naval superiority, since the extremely arid Atacama Desert was a formidable barrier for a land campaign. Therefore, the war first developed in a confrontation between the navies of Chile and Perú.

After the Chileans seized the port of Antofagasta on February 14, 1879, and secured it with the following victory at Calama on March 23, the focus was to destroy the Peruvian fleet. To achieve that goal, in April the Chilean government ordered Rear Admiral Juan Williams Rebolledo to sail to El Callao to sink the enemy ships on the docks or at anchor. However, since El Callao was heavily defended, Williams decided instead to block the port of Iquique, the most important Allied port in the Tarapacá department, with the idea to force the Peruvians to fight.

However, this proved futile, because the Peruvians didn't come in rescue of Iquique, and used that precious time to put its navy fit for combat. Besides, the long wait did all the contrary for the Chilean Fleet, wearing down the vessels and the crew's morale.

The situation tightened the public opinion, which forced Williams to lift the blockade and sail to El Callao. When he arrived, he found that the Peruvian fleet had departed on the 18. All this led to a simultaneous encounter at Punta Gruesa and Iquique on May 21, which proved decisive as the Peruvians lost one of their two modern ships -the ironclad Independencia-, to an old wooden schooner, the Covadonga; and the heroic death of Captain Arturo Prat and the loss of his old corvette, the Esmeralda, lifted the troops morale and ignited a nationalism among the Chileans which led a massive civilian enrolment. Only by the beginning of November, the Chilean Army grew from 2,995 men to 10,000.

After all of this, the Chileans resumed the blockade of Iquique, whilst the Peruvian Captain Miguel Grau brilliantly conducted a challenge strategy against his enemy -including the capture of an entire cavalry regiment and an attempt to attack Valparaíso-, while all efforts to capture him were useless. The lack of results and the poor management ended with Williams’ resignation, on August 5. At this point, the poor shape of the Chilean navy emerged as the undergoing reparations took an entire month. So, the new admiral, Galvarino Riveros, could sail from Valparaíso only by October 1, with the sole mission to find and destroy the Huáscar. The chase ended a week later with the decisive clash at Angamos on October 8, where Grau died and his ship was captured and later put under Chilean service. With this victory, the Pacific shores where open to a landing operation anywhere the Chilean high command considered necessary.

=== Belligerents situation ===
==== Chile ====
Chile had a very little army since the beginning of the decade, due to funding shortages that forced the government to reduce its personnel. Therefore, when the war started, the Chilean army had only 2,995 soldiers divided into four infantry regiments and another two of cavalry, which main experience was to patrol the frontier with the "araucanos", the Indians who held back the Spanish since the 1500s. The navy was about five old wooden corvettes and schooners -among them the Esmeralda and the Covadonga, until during Federico Errázuriz Echaurren's administration two modern ironclads, the Blanco Encalada and the Cochrane were bought in England.

However, the Chileans had an advantage with the Belgian Comblain rifle, which was rear loaded allowing a superior rate of fire, and the cavalry had Winchester carbines.

==== The Allies ====
The condition of the Allies wasn't much better. However both armies combined had more soldiers and artillery, their weapons were old compared to their enemy. Almost the entire Bolivian army was equipped with front-load muskets, with the only exception of Hilarión Daza's praetorian guard, the "Colorados" Battalion.

The Peruvians were in better shape. They had a navy in equal footing with the Chileans, with two modern vessels, the ironclad Huáscar and the frigate Independencia, plus a few ships like the corvette Unión.

=== The planning ===
Even before the war broke out, the Chilean government didn't trust in the capabilities of its High Command. The Army Commander in Chief, José Arteaga, and the Navy Admiral, Juan Williams, were veterans with more than forty years in service. Besides, bitter disputes between the older and a younger generation of officers in both branches did nothing but to convince President Pinto to appoint a civilian -War Minister Rafael Sotomayor- to supervise their planning and the war effort development. This made both Arteaga and Williams to resign to their commissions on July and August, 1879. Right after, the army was put under General Erasmo Escala, who fought against the rebellion of 1851, and the Navy under Admiral Galvarino Riveros. Also, another civilian, José Francisco Vergara, was appointed as Chief of Staff's Secretary. However, the real commander was Sotomayor.

After Riveros triumphed at Angamos the Chileans began the planning of the Tarapacá Department. Sotomayor wanted to attack in a spot between the Allied strongholds of Arica and Iquique, cutting their communications lines and enabling the army to take them out one at the time. After reviewing the terrain and weeks of preparations, it was decided to strike at Pisagua, a small port with a suitable bay for unloading troops and supplies. The landing was set to carry out on November 2.

On the Allied side, since May President Pardo and General Hilarión Daza were reunited at Tacna to plan the course of the war. The crippling of the Peruvian Fleet condemned the Allies to a defensive strategy, due to the harsh conditions of the Atacama Desert. With this difficulty in mind, on May 4 the Bolivian 3rd Division was embarked from El Callao to Pisagua, and established at Alto Hospicio, over the port's hill tops.

The Peruvian General Juan Buendía was in command of the Allied Southern Army at Tarapacá, who despite the importance of Pisagua didn't secure it as he should.

== Campaign ==
=== Landing at Pisagua ===
At 6 am on November 2, a twelve ship convoy appeared on the horizon alerting the Allied defences of Pisagua. The ensuing bombardment silenced the two forts guarding the bay entrance and marked the start of the landing operation. The first wave of boats managed to establish a beach head despite the resistance of the Bolivian defenders deployed behind improvised trenches. The second echelon pushed back the Allies and drove them off the port. Two more regiments were unshipped over a near beach at Junín but failed in reaching on time to battle.

The victory allowed the Chileans to establish a starting point from where to scout the region and repel the Allies. Immediately, cavalry scouts were sent to seek for water supplies and enemy troops. One of them encountered and crushed some Allied cavalry at Germania on November 6. Following the rail road, the raids found a water dwell at Dolores saltpetre office, which was rapidly reinforced with 6,500 men within the week, under Colonel Emilio Sotomayor.

When the Chilean move over Pisagua was known at Tacna, the Allies rapidly decided that General Daza, the Bolivian President, would lead his army to a rendezvous point set at Tana River's den, near Pisagua, where he would meet Buendía. From here both later would counterattack the Chileans to the sea. But, Daza wasn't sure of his officers' loyalty, and deliberately wore down his army. The Bolivians left Tacna and gathered around Arica by November 8, where the soldiers got drunk and lost all discipline. Finally, on the 11, Daza departed from Arica to Chaca, about 50 km south-southeast. However, his drunken soldiers collapsed about halfway, since Daza allowed his men to carry wine instead of water, with fatal consequences for many of them. Finally, when Daza reached the Camarones River on the 14, he had already lost 200 men. He was 50 km. away from Tana, and used the poor condition of his troops as an excuse to turn back north, action known as the Camarones betrayal.

The loss of Pisagua left Gen. Buendía in a difficult position. Pisagua and Iquique were his communications lines, and since May, Iquique was under blockade. Therefore, the liberation of Pisagua became his main objective. Buendía left Iquique on November 5 moving to Agua Santa where his forces were to reunite. From here he marched to Porvenir, prior to move north to join with Daza. However, on his way he encountered the Chileans over San Francisco hill near Dolores.

=== Battle of Dolores ===
Since outnumbered, Colonel Emilio Sotomayor deployed his troops over the San Francisco and Sazón hills watching the Allied movements over the plain. Buendía wanted to attack immediately, but was convinced otherwise by Col. Suárez, making him notice of the troops fatigue after a long march across the desert. So, both armies spent the rest of the morning only observing each other. However, the battle started unexpectedly on the 19. Sotomayor endured three attempts to overrun him which demoralised the Allies who fled from the battlefield in complete confusion, leaving all kinds of material and artillery.

Buendía retreated to Tarapacá with the remains of his army and stragglers found on the way. The artillery was lost, and his men were in poor conditions. However, his force grew considerably with Los Ríos' division, that left its post at Iquique when the Chilean blockade resumed, and Belisario Suárez -Buendía's Chief of Staff- soldiers. In total, the Allied added up about 4,500 men.

On the Chilean side, Lt. Col. José Francisco Vergara asked Gen. Escala to make a reconnaissance to find out the enemy's condition. So, on 24 November Vergara was dispatched with a party of roughly 400 men to Tarapacá. Later on, Arteaga knew that the Peruvians were more than expected. He sent another column made of two regiments, one battalion, 30 more riders and another artillery battery. Based on false information from a captured muleteer, who reported only 1,500 men at the town. Vergara asked Arteaga for instructions, and his request created great anxiety among Chilean High Command and troops. At this point, the Chilean commanders soundly underestimated the battle capabilities of the Allies. Arteaga did not properly prepare the Chilean forces dispatched for battle, meaning they did not carry enough supplies, which would have consequences later.

Arteaga gathered with his men at Isluga on 26 November. The march across the desert with insufficient food and water wore down his army. To make things worse, Arteaga still thought that in Tarapacá were no more than 2,500. Being at least 60 km. away from Dolores, the nearest supply point, Arteaga had no choice but to attack.

=== Battle of Tarapacá ===
Arteaga decided to attack dividing his force into three major columns, under Col. Ricardo Santa Cruz Vargas, Lt. Col. Eleuterio Ramírez and himself. The idea was to surprise the Peruvians at Tarapacá using the fog of the morning. However, Santa Cruz was spotted before he could deploy properly and the battle began. The Chileans were overwhelmed by the thirst and heavily outnumbered and defeated. The 2nd Line Regiment was the most damaged unit in the battle. The unit lost its banner, and the first and second commanders, Eleuterio Ramírez and Bartolomé Vivar.

In the end, Arteaga lost almost 30% of his soldiers, only because Buendía had no cavalry to pursue him. General Manuel Baquedano sent his riders to collect the stragglers, saving more than 200 men from diying in the desert. For Arteaga, Tarapacá meant the end of his career, and Vergara was pointed out as the responsible and sent to Santiago.

== Aftermath ==
In the end, Chile succeeded in controlling the Tarapacá Department. The main goal of the Chilean strategy was accomplished and the land in dispute was in Chilean hands. Also, the saltpeter trade changed hands and from now on it went to Chile's treasury, meaning an economic boon.

On the Allies perspective, this campaign was disastrous. Perú lost almost 200,000 population and an income of £30 million in nitrate exports. Bolivia had to bear the humiliation of Daza's retreat from Camarones, and the loss of Antofagasta.

The First Southern Army ended the campaign crippled. Its commanders, Juan Buendía and Belisario Suárez, were separated from their commands and court martialed.

The result of the campaign ended with the governments of Mariano Prado in Perú and Hilarión Daza in Bolivia. Both were replaced by Nicolás de Piérola and Narciso Campero.
