= Grand Lodge of Chile =

Masonic body in Chile

- Gran Logia de Chile

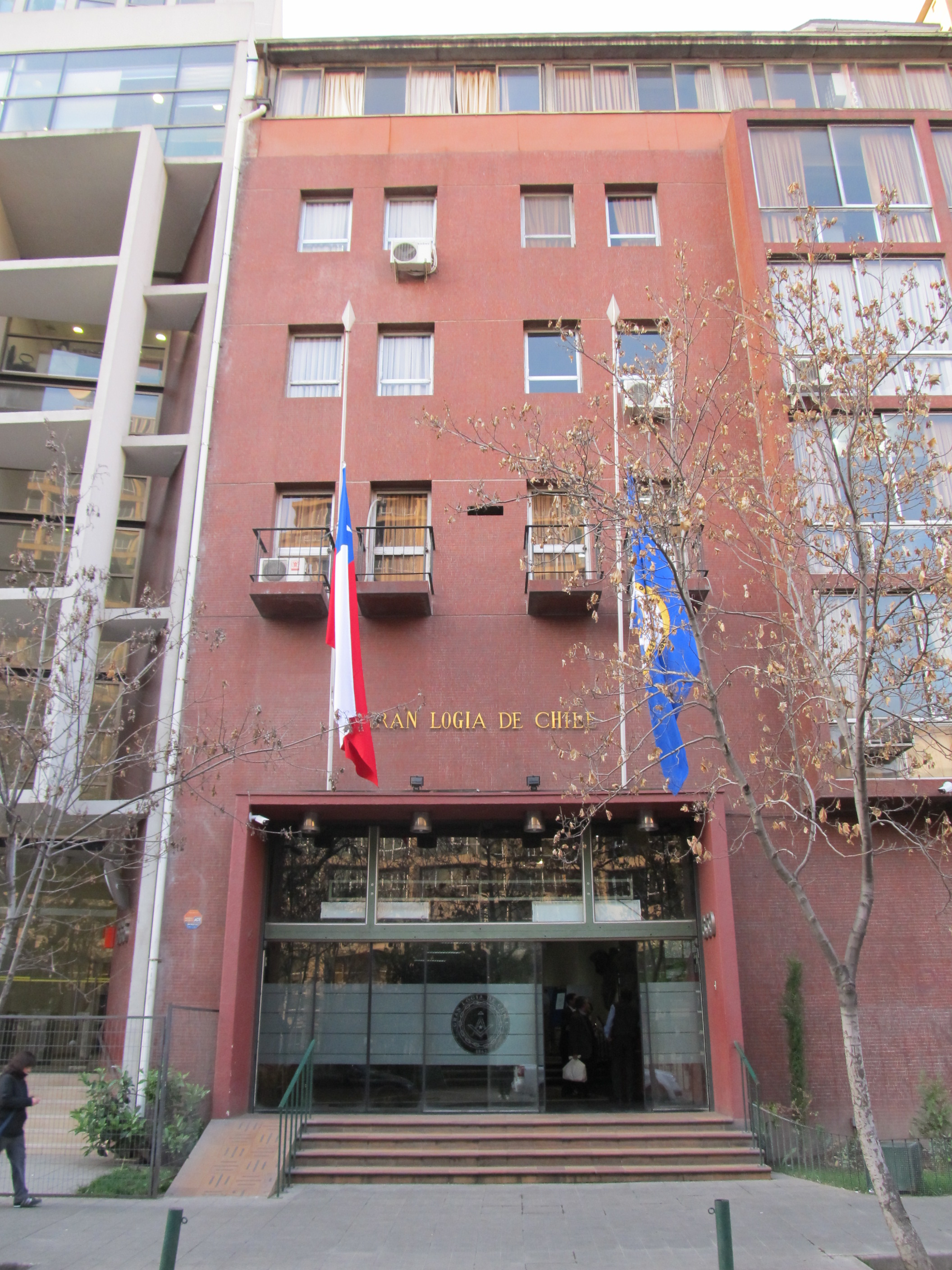
- Headquarters of the Grand Lodge of Chile
- Formation: May 24, 1862 (May 24, 1862; 164 years ago)
- Location: Santiago de Chile, Chile
- Coordinates: 33°26′16″S 70°39′01″W
- Members: 13,000
- Official language: Spanish
- Grand Master: Juan Eduardo Urrutia Bordagaray
- Key people: Enrique Pastor; Guillermo Gotschalk; Blas Cuevas
- Website: granlogia.cl

The Grand Lodge of Chile (Spanish: Gran Logia de Chile) is a regular Masonic body in Chile founded on May 24, 1862. The earthquake of 1906 destroyed the original headquarters and the archives of the Grand Lodge, which determined its definitive transfer to Santiago, settling in the Club de la República.

== History ==
To constitute a Grand Lodge as an autonomous masonic power, the tradition, and regulations usually shared in various nations require that there must be at least three formally constituted lodges in the territory.

By 1862, there were already four exclusively national lodges operating in the Spanish language in the country, namely: Unión Fraternal, directed by Manuel de Lima in Valparaíso; Aurora from Chile, directed by Enrique Pastor in Concepción; Hiram Lodge, directed by Guillermo Gotschalk in Copiapó; and Progreso, directed by Blas Cuevas in Valparaíso. On this basis, it was already possible to execute the original plan. After multiple steps and attempts, both nationally and abroad, it was finally possible to agree on April 29, 1862, in an assembly made up of the lodges of Valparaíso, Copiapó and Concepción, the formation of the Grand Lodge of Chile. On May 24, the election of the first officers of this Grand Lodge of Chile was held, whose details are as follows: "Venerable Grand Master: Juan de Dios Arlegui Gorbea, Grand Deputy: Melitón First Grand Warden Case: Fco. Javier Villanueva, Second Great Watchman: Manuel De Lima, Great Secretary: AM Medina, Great Speaker: MC de Sarratea, Great Treasurer: Pedro Gudde". On May 24, 1862, the first Grand Master was solemnly elected by his peers.

That distinction fell to the citizen Juan de Dios Arlegui Gorbea, who came from a traditional and Catholic family that had in the clergy a bishop uncle, José Santiago Rodríguez Zorrilla, and a great-uncle, Juan de Dios Arlegui Rodríguez. His tutors had also received the Catholic influence. He spent some years studying theology at the Conciliar Seminary. There he received lessons from the prelate José Hipólito Salas y Toro, from the theologian Justo Donoso Vivanco, as well as from the Argentine priest Manuel Castro y Barros. Despite this powerful religious influence, Juan de Dios Arlegui, without alienating his family and teachers, was able to discover his destiny that would lead him to lead an intellectual movement of rationalist inspiration, revolutionary for that time.

After the Conciliar seminar, he went on to study at the Instituto Nacional, under the rectorate of Antonio Varas, where he received lessons from the sociologist, politician, and educator José Victorino Lastarria.

Graduated as a lawyer on November 7, 1848, Juan de Dios Arlegui Gorbea settled in Valparaíso to exercise his profession, conquering there the honorable reputation of Jurisconsult. He was also a deputy and a senator, always representing the progressive current and collaborating in several projects of positive national benefit. For a decade he directed the destinies of the Grand Lodge, a period in which the lodges Justice and Liberty No. 5, Duty and Constancy No. 7 and Truth No. 10 were founded in Santiago.

Personalities of the time entered these new workshops, such as: Eduardo De la Barra, Guillermo and Manuel Antonio Matta Goyenechea, Miguel Santamaría, Juan Agustín Palazuelos Ramírez, Pedro León Gallo Goyenechea, Juan Nepomuceno Espejo Bravo, Diego Barros Arana, Ramón Allende Padín, Alejo Palma Guzmán, Francisco Gandarillas Luco, José Francisco Vergara Echevers, Enrique Mac-Iver Rodríguez, Germán Tenderini y Vacca, Aníbal Pinto Garmendia, Andrés and Jacinto Chacón, Juan Williams Rebolledo, Justo and Juan Domingo Arteaga Alenparte, Marcial Gatica, José Tomás Urmeneta, Juan Enrique Lagarrigue, Manuel Carrera Pinto, Emilio Orrego Luco, Francisco Santa Cruz and others of varied ages and professions.

Interesting at that time was the extension of Masonic lodges to the field of politics, through the inauguration of groups called Clubs de la Reforma, which functioned in Santiago and other provinces of the country from 1868 to 1871.

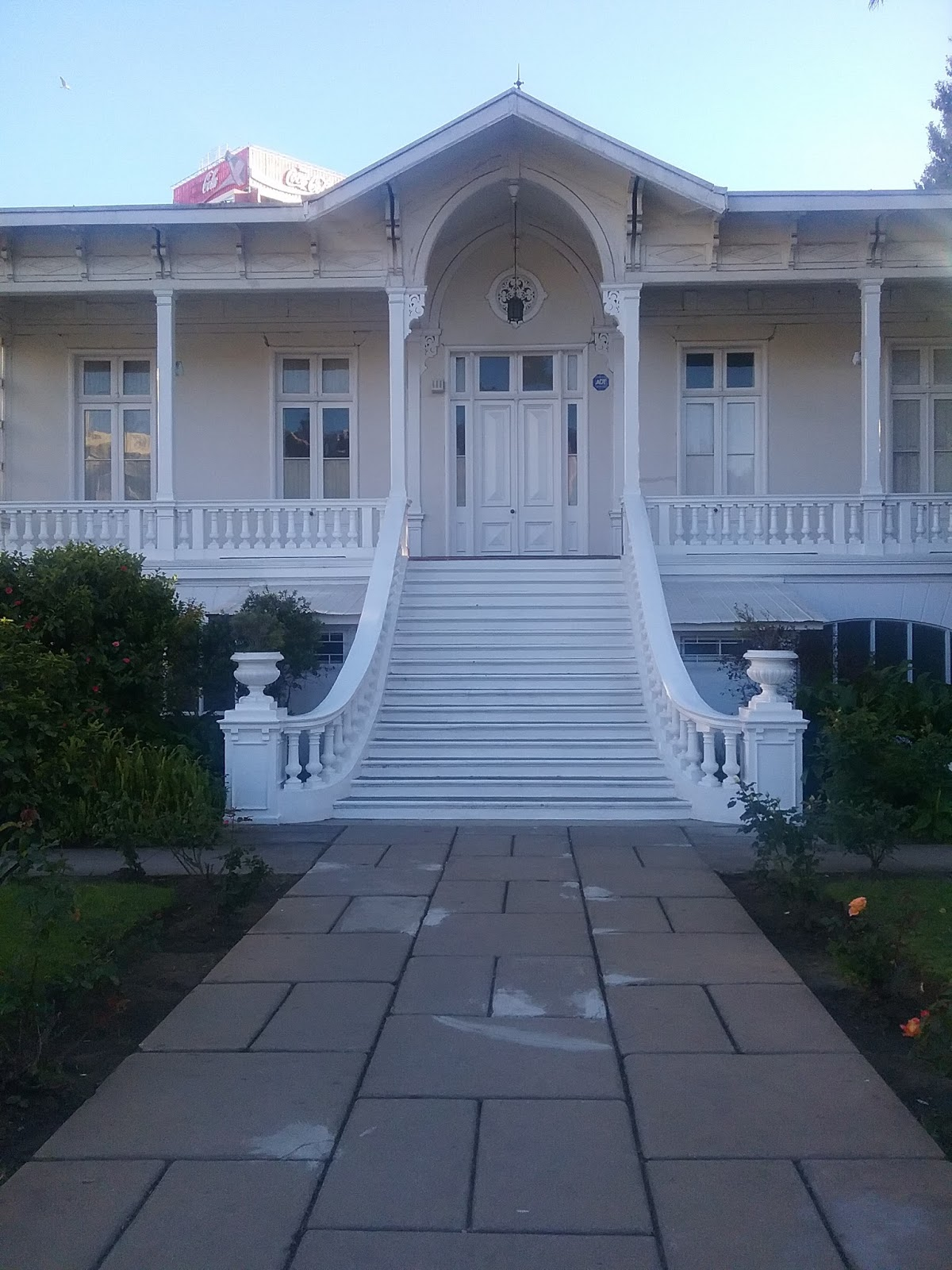
Viña del Mar Masonic House

These clubs were true circles in which most of the ideological, social and educational transformations that society needed were debated and many of which entered the constitutional reform of the government of Federico Errázuriz Zañartu. Others of these approaches were written in the text of the Chilean Constitution of 1925.

After the creation of the Truth Lodge in 1872 –the tenth dependent upon the Grand Lodge of Chile–, a significant number of Masonic workshops were founded throughout the national territory. Influential personalities from the social, business and educational fields joined in each city.

In 1862, the Grand Lodge of Chile was recognized by the Grand Lodge of Massachusetts, that is, the same year it was founded, and the following year it would obtain recognition from the Grand Lodge of the District of Columbia.

In 1864, when the problems caused by Napoleon III in French Freemasonry had already been overcome, official recognition was obtained by the Central Grand Orient de France. By 1862, the first Constitution was promulgated under the name of Statutes of the Masonic Order in Chile.

Towards the year 1912, by agreement of the Assembly of the Grand Lodge of Chile, the Constitution and the general statutes were founded to give rise to the definitive Masonic Constitution, which had undergone reforms in the years: 1921, 1930, 1938, 1955, 1971, 1978 and 1984.

Initially, the Grand Lodge of Chile governed both symbolic and philosophical Freemasonry. At the end of the 19th century, Eduardo de la Barra established, through letters patent granted in Argentina, a Supreme Council of the 33rd degree to administer the philosophical degrees, while the Grand Lodge exercised jurisdiction over the symbolic workshops.

The headquarters of the Grand Lodge of Chile were in Valparaíso from its foundation until 1906, when the devastating Valparaíso earthquake occurred that severely damaged the Masonic house, after which it was moved to Santiago. In the capital, it settled in the city center, in the now defunct San Carlos gallery, where five lodges worked: Deber y Constancia No. 7, Aurora de Italia No. 24, Verdad No. 10, Franklin No. 27 and the Union Fraternal No. 1 of Buenos Aires.

== Rites ==
The Grand Lodge of Chile has jurisdiction over the symbolic lodges (they work in the degrees of apprentice, companion and Master Mason), these can work three different rites: Ancient and Accepted Scottish Rite, York Rite and Schröder Rite

== Grand Masters of the Grand Lodge of Chile ==
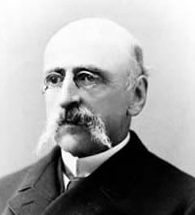
Juan de Dios Arlegui Gorbea First Grand Master of the Grand Lodge of Chile

- Juan de Dios Arlegui Gorbea (1862-1872)
- Francisco Javier Villanueva Godoy (1872-1873)
- Benicio Álamos González (1873-1875, 1900-1902)
- José Miguel Fáez (1875-1877, 1882-1884)
- Evaristo Soublette Buroz (1877-1881)
- José Francisco Vergara Echevers (1881-1882)
- Ramón Allende Padín (1884)
- Rafael Barazarte Oliva (1884-1886)
- Enrique Mac-Iver Rodríguez (1887-1894)
- Alejo Palma Guzmán (1894-1900)
- Buenaventura Cádiz Patiño (1902-1906)
- Víctor Guillermo Ewing Acuña (1909-1922)
- Luis Alberto Navarrete y López (1912-1922)
- Alfredo Melossi Hutchinson (1922-1924)
- Adeodato García Valenzuela (1924)
- Héctor Boccardo Benvenuto (1924-1930)
- Armando Quezada Acharán (1930-1931)
- Eugenio Matte Hurtado (1931-1932)
- David Benavente Sepúlveda (1933-1935)
- Fidel Muñoz Rodríguez (1935-1937)
- Hermógenes del Canto Aguirre (1937-1944)
- René García Valenzuela (1944-1947, 1969-1974)
- Orestes Frödden Lorenzen (1948-1953)
- Alejandro Serani Burgos (1954-1957)
- Aristóteles Berlendis Sturla (1957-1968)
- Sótero del Río Gundián (1968-1969)
- Horacio González Contesse (1974-1982)
- Oscar Pereira Henríquez (1982-1990)
- Marino Pizarro (1990-1998)
- Jorge Carvajal Muñoz (1998-2006)
- Juan José Oyarzún (2006-2010)
- Luis Riveros Cornejo (2010-2018)
- Sebastián Jans Pérez (2018-2022)

== Featured Freemasons ==
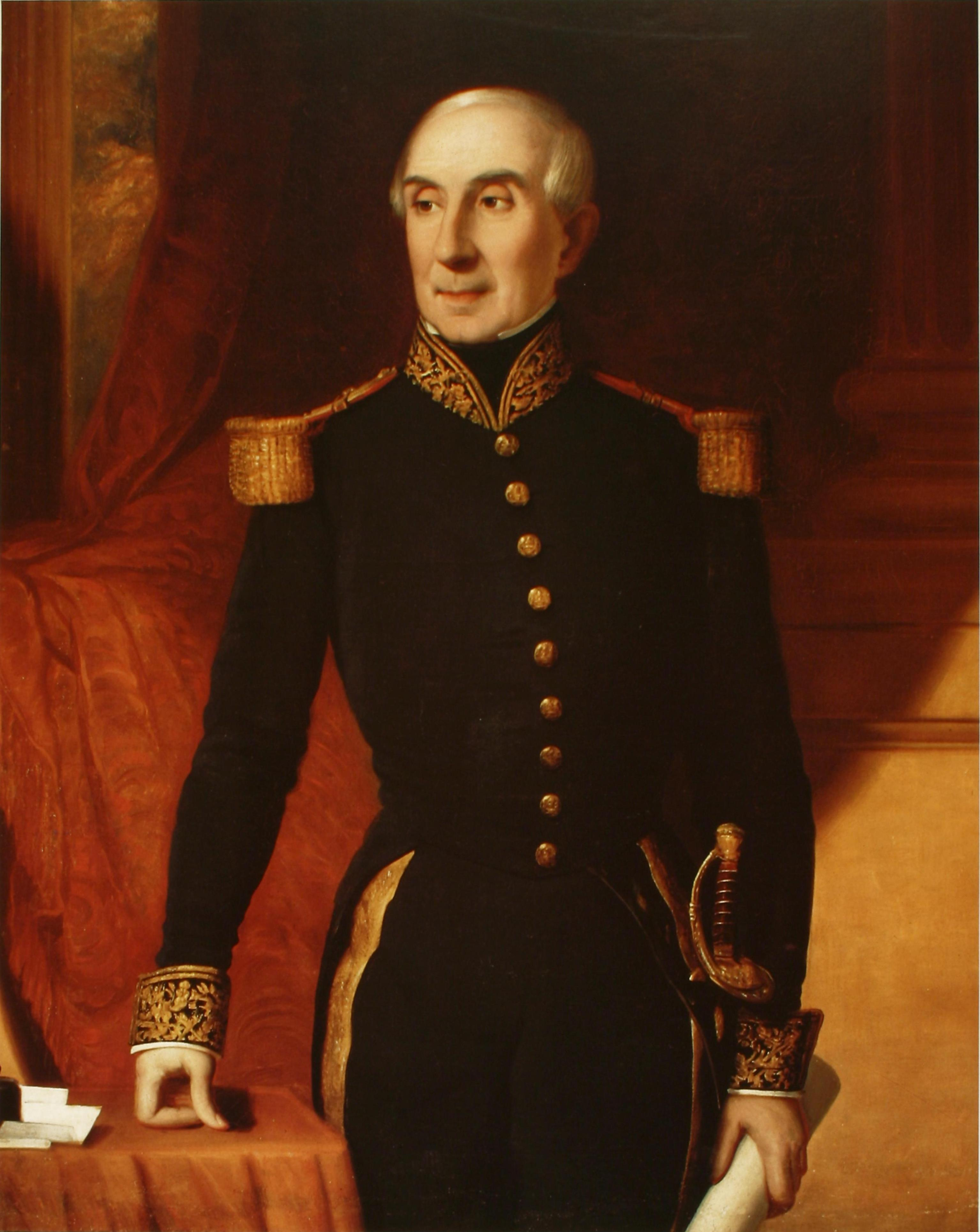
Manuel Blanco Encalada, first president of the Republic of Chile and prominent freemason.

=== Presidents of Chile ===
- José Miguel de la Carrera y Verdugo
- Bernardo O'Higgins Riquelme
- Ramón Freire Serrano
- Manuel Blanco Encalada
- Aníbal Pinto Garmendia
- Arturo Alessandri Palma
- Pedro Aguirre Cerda
- Jerónimo Méndez Arancibia
- Juan Antonio Ríos Morales
- Gabriel González Videla
- Carlos Ibáñez del Campo
- Salvador Allende Gossens
- Augusto Pinochet Ugarte

=== Navy ===
- Manuel Blanco Encalada
- Juan José Latorre
- Luis Pardo Villalón
- Manuel Thomson Porto Mariño

=== Army ===
- Estanislao del Canto Arteaga
- Diego Dublé Almeyda
- Pedro Lagos Marchant
- Emilio Sotomayor Baeza
- Carlos Ibáñez del Campo

=== Air Force ===
- Alberto Bachelet
- Marmaduke Grove
- Arturo Merino Benítez

=== Politicians ===
- Ángel Gallo Goyenechea
- Juan Gómez Millas
- Eugenio González Rojas
- Juvenal Hernández
- José Victorino Lastarria
- Enrique Silva Cimma

=== Writers ===
- Francisco Bilbao
- Guillermo Blest Gana
- Benedicto Chuaqui Kettlun
- Manuel Magallanes Moure

=== Artists ===
- Fernando Daza Osorio
- Nicanor Plaza

== See also ==
- Gran Logia Mixta de Chile
- Gran Logia Femenina de Chile
