= Rafael Sotomayor =

Chilean politician

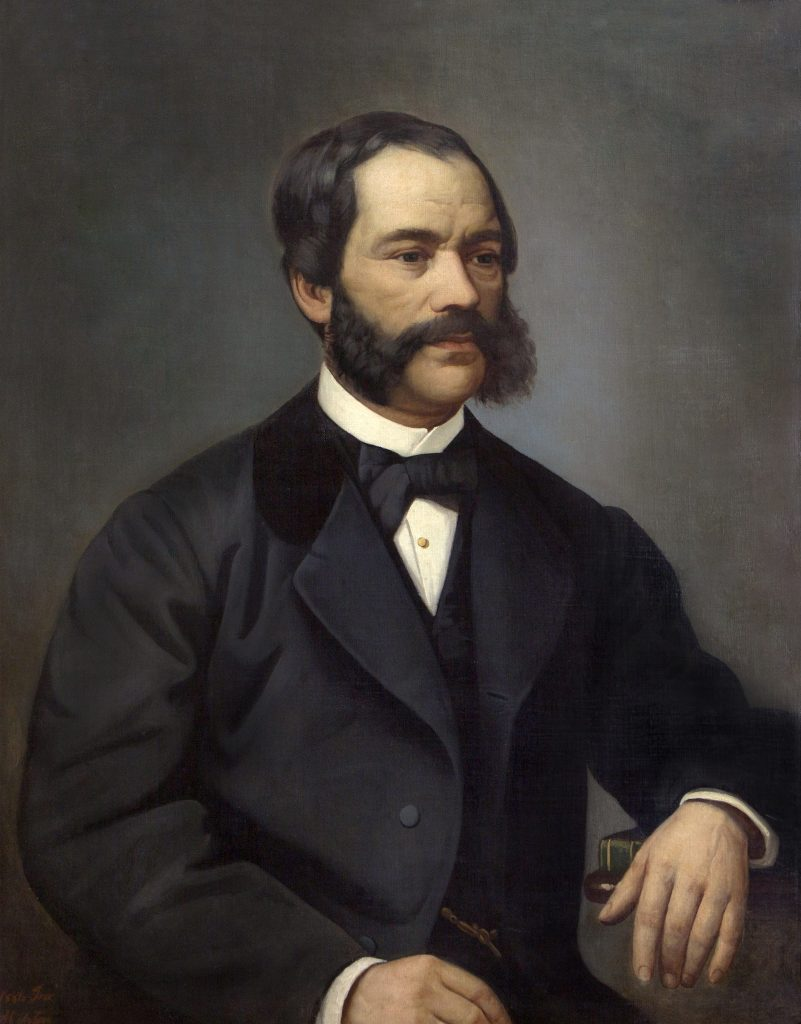
- Portrait of Rafael Sotomayor. (Oil by José Mercedes Ortega, 1881).

Minister of War and Navy of Chile
- In office 20 August 1879 – 20 May 1880
- President: Aníbal Pinto
- Preceded by: Basilio Urrutia
- Succeeded by: José Francisco Vergara

Minister of Finance of Chile
- In office 18 September 1876 – 27 October 1877
- President: Aníbal Pinto
- Preceded by: Ramón Barros Luco
- Succeeded by: Augusto Matte Pérez

Mayor of Concepción
- In office 1853–1859
- Preceded by: Giuseppe Rondizzoni
- Succeeded by: Vicente Pérez Rosales

Personal details
- Born: Rafael Sotomayor Baeza; 13 September 1823 Melipilla, Chile
- Died: 20 May 1880 (aged 56) Tacna, Peru
- Party: National Party
- Children: Rafael Sotomayor Gaete
- Relatives: Emilio Sotomayor Baeza (brother)
- Education: Instituto Nacional General José Miguel Carrera
- Profession: Lawyer

Rafael Sotomayor Baeza (13 September 1823 – 20 May 1880) was a Chilean lawyer and politician. As Minister of War and Navy he was the main organiser of Chilean forces during the War of the Pacific. He died of a stroke while on campaign.
