= Emilio Sotomayor Baeza =

Chilean politician (1826–1894)

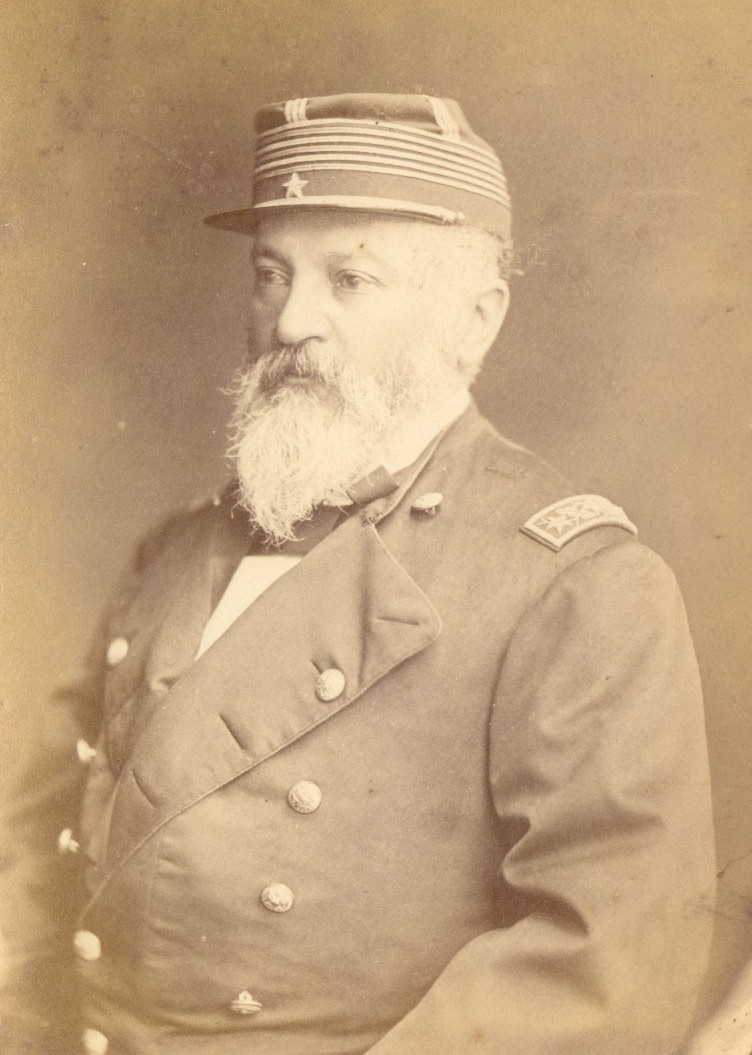

Commander-in-Chief of the Chilean Army
- In office January 4, 1884 – August 22, 1888
- President: José Manuel Balmaceda
- Preceded by: Cornelio Saavedra Rodríguez
- Succeeded by: José Francisco Gana Castro

Intendant of the provinces of Chiloé and Valdivia
- In office 1872–1872

Proprietary deputy of the Republic of Chile of Castro
- In office 1870–1873

Personal details
- Born: 1826 Melipilla, Santiago Metropolitan Region, Chile
- Died: March 17, 1894 (aged 67–68) Santiago, Santiago Metropolitan Region, Chile
- Party: Pipiolos

Military service
- Allegiance: Conservative Republic; Liberal Republic
- Branch: Chilean Army
- Years of service: 1845 – 1888
- Rank: General
- Battles/wars: Chilean Revolution of 1851: Battle of Cerro Grande; Chincha Islands War; War of the Pacific: Lima campaign; Occupation of Lima

Emilio Sotomayor Baeza (1826-1894) was a Chilean general and politician who was the Commander-in-Chief of the Chilean Army from January 4, 1884 to August 22, 1888 as well as a prominent military commander during the War of the Pacific.

== Biography ==
Emilio was the son of farmer Justo Sotomayor y Elzo and Clara Baeza y Ojeda. He was the seventh of 12 sons, among whom Rafael Sotomayor Baeza was one of them. He married Rosa Leighton Frederick.

After entering the Chilean Army in 1845 and in 1846 he was already an officer in the National Guard. On August 17, 1847, before his 22nd birthday, he held the position of Alférez de Artillería.

Although he did not graduate as a student at the Libertador Bernardo O'Higgins Military Academy, his culture and illustration allowed him to get promotions in his career.

Three years after joining the Army, he was already a lieutenant . With that degree he faced the pipiola revolution in 1851, when Manuel Francisco Montt Torres arrived at the government. Under the command of General Juan Vidaurre-Leal he went to Coquimbo and fought in Petorca and besieged La Serena where he got wounded in the latter which got him promoted to Captain.

He participated in the Chilean Revolution of 1851 against the liberals in the battles of Petorca and in the siege of La Serena. Eight years later he fought in the Battle of Cerro Grande.

In 1857 he requested retirement from service, but a year later he was appointed commander of the Municipal Guard of Valparaíso, for which he had to request his reincorporation into active service, and was promoted in May of that same year to the rank of major. Under the orders of Vidaurre-Leal, he fought in the battle of Los Loros in 1859 and later in Cerro Grande, against the improvised army of Pedro León Gallo Goyenechea. The same year 1859 he was promoted to lieutenant colonel and in charge of the artillery of Valparaíso. Along with 25 soldiers, he put down a mutiny that killed Vidaurre-Leal who was the mayor of Valparaíso.

In 1865, during the Chincha Islands War, he was appointed intendant of Chiloé. He then fortified the Bay of Ancud with heavy caliber artillery, the Spanish ships did not attack the archipelago in 1866.

In 1869 he was appointed head of the Maestranza de Limache and in 1867, he was appointed honorary president of the Africa Institute based in Paris, France.

He was then made the director of the Escuela Militar del Libertador Bernardo O'Higgins. He was also a founding partner of the Second Fire Company Bomba A. Edwards R. in Valdivia.

He served as proprietary deputy for Castro, Chile from 1870 to 1873, and was a member of the Permanent War and Navy Commission.

In 1872 he traveled to Europe as head of the Military Commission in order to buy weapons, at which time he also took the opportunity to study and perfect himself. The result of the trip was the purchase of 12,000 Comblain II rifles that were the regular weapon of the army during the War of the Pacific .

In 1879 he was sent to occupy the town of Antofagasta during the War of the Pacific. In 1880, he was promoted to Brigadier General and delegated inspector of the Army in operations against Peru and Bolivia. He also participated in the Occupation of Lima, when Chilean troops triumphantly entered the Peruvian capital on January 17, 1881 and served as the first political chief during the occupation. On February 28, he agreed to the position of general in chief due to the absence of General Manuel Baquedano.

In 1856 he entered the Grand Lodge of Chile, where from 1870 he held the position of Venerable Master of the Lodge "Duty and Constancy" No. 7.

He directed the Escuela Militar del Libertador Bernardo O'Higgins in 1868, 1878 and 1880 but in 1888. After more than 40 years of service, he definitively retired from the Army. He died at his home in Santiago on March 17, 1894, as a victim of a strange disease and was buried at the Santiago General Cemetery.
