= Battle of Pisagua =

- Part of the War of the Pacific
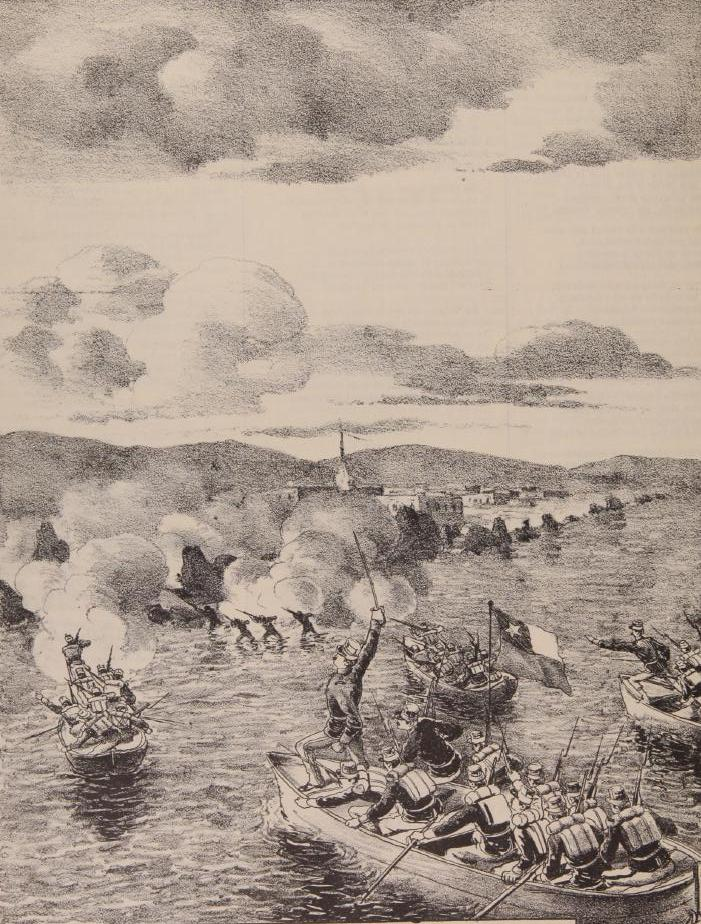
Date	November 2, 1879
Location	Pisagua, Peru (present-day Chile) 19.599°S 70.215°W
Result	Chilean victory

Belligerents
Chile	Peru; Bolivia

Commanders and leaders
(Chile) Erasmo Escala	(Peru) Juan Buendia

Strength
Available: ~8,890; In Pisagua: 4,890–5,000	1,141 (924 Bolivian and 217 Peruvian)

Casualties and losses
62 killed 130 wounded	200 casualties
- Location within Chile Battle of Pisagua (South America) Battle of Pisagua (America)

The Battle of Pisagua ("Desembarco y combate de Pisagua"), was a landing operation of the War of the Pacific, fought on November 2, 1879, between Chile and the combined forces of Bolivia and Peru. The Chilean army commanded by Erasmo Escala, supported by the Chilean Fleet, launched an amphibious assault on the port of Pisagua and successfully drove the defending Bolivian-Peruvian forces, led by Gen. Juan Buendia, back from the shore. They established a beachhead that allowed an initial force of about 1,000 Chilean soldiers in two assault waves to disembark onto Peruvian territory at Pisagua in Tarapacá Department. This region was the principal territory in dispute.

This action marked the beginning of the Tarapacá Campaign, the first stage of the terrestrial phase of the War of the Pacific, which ended with Chilean control of the Tarapacá and of the exportation of saltpetre. This vast territory has never been returned to Bolivia and Peru; it was annexed in perpetuity to Chile by the Treaty of Ancon, signed in 1884.

== Prelude ==
War was declared in April 1879, among the nations of Bolivia, Chile, and Peru. The War resulted in the loss of not only valuable mining areas in Bolivia, but the loss of Bolivia's access to the Pacific. Peru also lost a large piece of her southern mining region.

The three nations recognized the strategic importance of the sea for access to the contested territory. Control of the coast and adjacent seas was the principal objective from the beginning of hostilities, and the war first developed almost entirely on the sea. The land operations theatre was an arid desert along the coast and the adjacent saltpeter-mining areas inland. The mining region comprised the westernmost part of Bolivia, including that nation's entire seacoast, and a substantial part of southern Peru. Control of the sea and the coast would give a decisive logistic advantage in the forthcoming land battles. Hence, when Chile gained military control of the sea along the coast with the victory at Angamos (Battle of Angamos) on October 8, 1879, a landing operation became imminent as a beginning of the terrestrial campaign to secure the Tarapacá. At the time the Allies (Bolivia and Peru) had north of the Chilean city of Antofagasta, three strongholds in the province, Tacna (today the southernmost Peruvian coastal city, on the Chilean border), Arica (a coastal town on the then Peruvian coast, and today the northernmost Chilean city, on the Peruvian border), the town of Pisagua (then the Peruvian coast on the Tarapacá department), and Iquique (south of Pisagua and originally on the Peruvian coast). The Chilean command deemed it obvious that the landing had to isolate and interrupt communications between these two important Allied emplacements. After a reconnaissance made by a commission formed by General Luis Arteaga, Baldomero Dublé Almeyda, José Velásquez and Emilio Gana, the port of Pisagua, located 500 km north of Antofagasta, and was selected as the site for an amphibious landing operation, because its bay was suitable for landing troops and supplies.

Chilean War Minister Rafael Sotomayor planned and organized the operation in secrecy to avoid further arguments with the military and to avoid possible indiscretions that might reach the enemy's ears. Hence, on October 9, the day after the Angamos victory, Sotomayor ordered that the transports carrying the Atacama, Lautaro and Coquimbo civic battalions sail to Antofagasta. The next days were of feverish activities, transporting troops to Antofagasta, from where on October 19, the final preparations were made for the Chilean expeditionary force's departure. The war vessels forming this convoy were the Magallanes, O’Higgins, Covadonga, Amazonas, Angamos, and Loa, and the steam transports Itata, Lamar, Limarí, Matías Cousiño, Santa Lucía, Copiapó, Toltén, Huanay, and Paquete del Maule. Under supervision of Sotomayor and General Escala 9,405 soldiers and 853 horses and mules were embarked. Aboard the flagship Angamos were Sotomayor and Escala, plus Fleet Commander Manuel Thompson, the Chief of Staff, and the General Headquarters personnel. On November 1, the convoy was at the rendezvous point. Only Sotomayor and Captain Carlos Condell were aware of the convoy's destination.

=== Chilean planning and forces ===
In two war meetings held with the Army and Navy officers, the Chilean War Minister revealed that the designated invasion point was Pisagua. A main surprise attack at Pisagua was agreed upon, while a secondary attack would take place at Junín. The Northern assault force of 4,890 men of infantry and artillery would disembark at Pisagua, establish a beach head, and begin climbing up to the higher plateau; the Southern assault force of 2,175 men would take Junín, and 2,500 men would be held in reserve. Col. Emilio Sotomayor, brother of War Minister Sotomayor, was entrusted with directing the landing operations. Commander Thompson was in command of the naval stage of the disembarking and directing the landing boats. Two miles beyond the shore, the Cochrane, Magallanes, Covadonga and O’Higgins would enter the bay and attack the forts guarding the port. Once the forts' guns were silenced the landing operations would begin.

=== Allied forces and defense planning ===
The Allied garrison at Pisagua was formed by Bolivian artillery and infantry soldiers, totaling about 1,000 troops in two battalions: Independencia, commanded by Pedro Vargas, and Victoria, commanded by Juan Granier. In addition there were 200 Peruvian soldiers commanded by Isaac Recavarren, who left the command over Gen. Juan Buendía. Pisagua had been fortified on its southern edge. At Pichalo Point there was a fortified emplacement with one 100-pounder cannon; at the northern edge was an emplacement with a similar cannon. The narrow bay between could be covered by a crossfire from these two guns, making entrance into the port by sea more difficult. The steep hill that reached the plateau permitted the occupying troops to fire from a higher position, although the beach was surrounded by rocks that might provide safe positions for Chilean infantry.

== The battle begins ==
Battle of Pisagua according to Diego Barros Arana's "Historia de la Guerra del Pacifico"

The Chilean Navy initiated bombardment at 07:00 on November 2. The Cochrane and O'Higgins entered the bay and opened fire on the south-most fort at Pichalo Point, while the Magallanes and the Covadonga attacked the other fort on the north side of the bay. The gunships' accurate fire silenced the defenses almost immediately; the northern fort was able to fire only one shot before being temporarily disabled. An hour later, both forts were silent. The landing operation was delayed, however, and the northern fort's cannon resumed firing. The Cochrane, Captain Latorre, answered immediately, and by 09:00 the northern cannon was silenced and the Chilean troop transports then entered the bay. At the same time the Amazonas was firing over Alto Hospicio, north of the bay.

=== The Chileans Disembark ===
At two kilometres from the shore, the landing boats were ready for disembarking troops who were to establish a beachhead. At 10:15, the navy ceased its barrage and the boats began to move. But instead of 900 men, only 450 soldiers were embarked - two companies of the Atacama Battalion and another two of the Zapadores Regiment. Upon entering the northern side of Pisagua beach these Chilean infantry came within firing range of the Allied defenders' on the heights at Playa Blanca (White Beach). Despite the heavy fire from the heights (shown on the Chilean military map accompanying this article to be held by the Bolivians), the landing force started to return fire. Their situation was very difficult due to the lack of reinforcements and strong position of the defenders, but the Zapadores led by Ricardo Santa Cruz assailed the Allied positions on the hill slope. From the higher position, the Chileans would then be able to fire on the Allied positions lower down the slope and make the disembarking of their reinforcements less risky. In support of the Zapadores attack the fleet opened fire again, this time over the train station at Alto Hospicio. Meanwhile, the Chilean first-wave troops endured 45 minutes of heavy fire until the second wave landed at 11:00.

=== The heights under attack ===
The first two of three Chilean landing units were now disembarked, and the fight became less favorable for the Allied defenders. This second wave brought the rest of the Atacama Battalion plus three companies of the "Buin" 1st Line Regiment commanded by Lt. Colonel José María del Canto. The Chileans struck both Playa Blanca and Caleta Guatas, dislodging the defenders, who fled to Alto Hospicio under a constant barrage. The Allied troops had taken cover behind bags filled with saltpetre and coal, which, because of the firing, began to burn. The resulting dense smoke covered the landing of the Chilean third wave. When the Bolivian troops began retiring toward the train station at Alto Hospicio, their comrades on the beach also were forced to retreat.

When the Chilean commander of the Second Division, Luis José Ortíz, arrived on shore, the main assault on the high plateau began. It required two hours for the Chilean infantry to climb the slope, since the ascent of steep terrain was very difficult with the strong Allied defense in this sector. However, in the end, the vehemence of the Chilean attack made it possible to reach the summit and engage the Allies, vanquishing all resistance and forcing them to abandon their positions and withdraw northward toward Alto Hospicio. Lt. Rafael Torreblanca of the Atacama Battalion raised the Chilean flag over Alto Hospicio at 15:00, as the Allied defenders fled from the battlefield, leaving it to the Chilean army.

=== Junín ===
Because Pisagua was conquered, the second landing at Junín was made with little Peruvian resistance. Here were deployed the 3rd Line Regiment and the Navales and Valparaíso infantry battalions.

== Aftermath ==
The Chilean Army casualties were 62 men dead and 130 wounded. The Allies' (Bolivians and Peruvians) casualties were 200 dead and wounded. This victory provided the Chilean forces a port where they could land troops, weapons, and supplies. The Campaign of Tarapacá had begun.

The Pisagua landing marked the start of a new era in amphibious warfare in the world, an era that would be pioneered by what is now the Chilean Marine Corps, which alongside the Army, celebrate the date as a military holiday to mark this historic moment in international military history as a whole.

== Bibliography ==
- Gómez Ehrmann, Sergio; Reyno Gutiérrez, Manuel (1985). Historia del Ejército de Chile, Vol. V. Estado Mayor General del Ejército de Chile.
- Pelayo, Mauricio; Mellafe, Rafael (2004). La Guerra del Pacífico en imágenes, relatos, testimonios. Centro de Estudios Bicentenario. ISBN 978-956-8147-33-4.
- Cluny, Claude (2008). Atacama, Ensayo sobre la Guerra del Pacífico 1879 - 1883. Fondo de Cultura Económica. ISBN 978-968-16-7982-8.
- Robles Diez, Enrique (2009). La Guerra del Pacífico, Partes oficiales - La Campaña de Tarapacá 1879. Editorial Estudios Americanos. ISBN 978-956-8842-03-1.

== External links (in Spanish) ==
- The Forgotten Heroes
- The Chilean Navy
- Battle of Pisagua (Wikipedia: Spanish)
- Battle of Tarapaca: Brief synopsis (in Spanish, from Website of Peruvian military central command)
