= La Planicie =

Neighbourhood of Lima, Peru

Coordinates: 12°04′30″S 76°54′37″W

- Neighbourhood
- Interactive map of La Planicie
- Country: Peru
- Department: Lima
- Province: Lima
- District: La Molina
- Established: 1950s
- Time zone: UTC-5 (PET)

La Planicie (pronounced [la plaˈniθje]; lit. 'the plain') is a neighbourhood of La Molina District. A gated community, it is inhabited by upper-class families and considered one of the most exclusive and expensive areas of Lima, Peru.

== History ==
During the War of the Pacific, a division of Orozimbo Barbosa marched through the area, then part of Ate District, at 7 a.m. on January 9, 1881, with the intent to deceive local Peruvian troops under the command of Mariano Vargas and divert them to the area to defend the city against an east-to-west attack instead of a southern advance, which actually took place. Both armies clashed at what became known as the Battle of La Rinconada de Ate, with the Peruvians being defeated and the eastern entrance to the city left wide open, although such an entrance was ultimately not used.

The area began to be urbanised during the 1950s. On February 6, 1962, La Molina was established as a district separate from Ate. The mining area of La Planicie de Pampa Grande was included in the district through its prior acquisition by the Aparicio-Figari Group, contributing about 50% of its territory, from which the neighbourhoods of La Planicie, El Lago and Las Lagunas were created. A number of artificial water bodies were created with water from Rímac River taken to the new neighbourhoods, with more developments taking place on the western side of the area.

The area is divided into several sectors:

- La Portada De La Planicie
- Country Club La Planicie
- La Planicie Este
- La Alameda De La Planicie
- El Rincón De La Planicie
- Las Lomas De La Planicie
- El Peñón De La Planicie
- El Mirador De La Planicie

=== Country Club La Planicie ===
La Planicie is home to one of the most exclusive and prestigious golf clubs in Lima, the Country Club La Planicie (CCLP) located in Av. José Barandiarán 457 Urb. La Planicie, La Molina, Lima, Peru.

=== Real estate and housing ===
The high-security gated neighborhood of La planicie features a limited and restricted access to guests via multiple security checkpoints making safety a key factor affecting the elevated prices for this residences. Known for large spacious properties, luxury mansions, extensive green spaces and pools, and private gardens, homes in La Planicie typically start above $1.2 million and can reach upwards of several million dollars.

=== Recent controversies and news ===
In 2023, 49 Malaysians—23 men and 26 women—were released from their illegal custody in a house next to Villa María School after a raid by the police on October 7th, with 6 Taiwanese and 2 Peruvians, who acted as the residence's security guards, arrested. They were forced to participate in an illegal scheme of scam calls called "Macau Scam" where they performed scam calls to Malaysian and Taiwanese companies demanding money posing as banks or government officials.

In 2024, a mass grave with the remains of at least three people was discovered near the neighbourhood eastern limit with Cieneguilla.

== See also ==
- Gated community
