= Structure of the Chilean Army =

This is an order of battle of the Chilean Army.

Office of the Army Commander in Chief in Santiago, the Army's headquarters city where it is situated

- Military Scenarios and Investigations Center
- Office of the Army Secretary General
- Office of the Army Auditor General

Army General Staff Office (Estado Mayor General del Ejército)

- Finance Directorate
- Logistics
- Intelligence Directorate
- Projects Department

== Ground Operations Command ==
Army Ground Operations Command, headquartered in Concepcion, the base garrison of the Chacabuco 6th Infantry Regiment

=== I Division ===
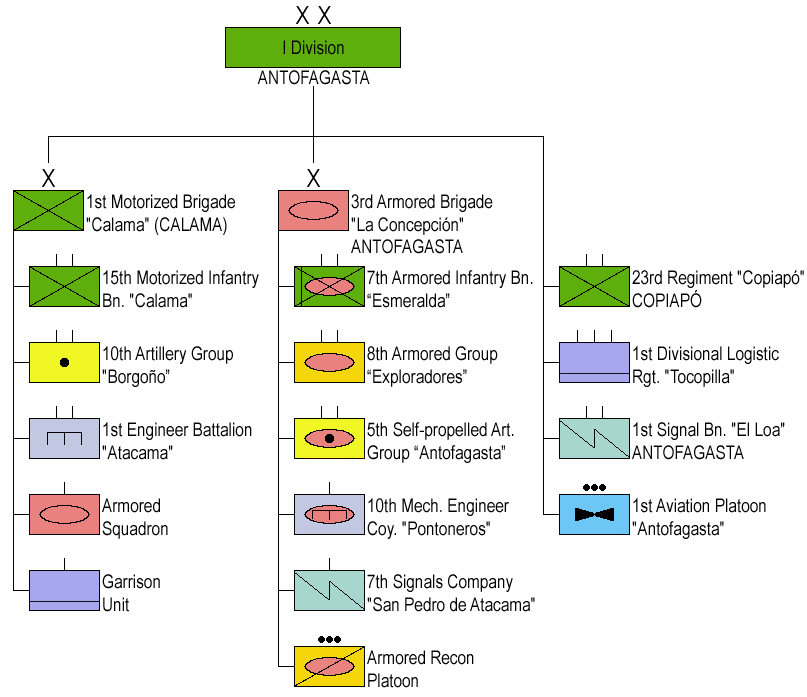
Structure of the I Division 2019

Responsible for the defense of the Antofagasta and Atacama regions.

- I Division, in Antofagasta
  - 1st Motorized Brigade "Calama" (Brigada Motorizada N.º 1 "Calama") in Calama
    - 15th Motorized Infantry Battalion "Calama" (Batallón de Infantería Motorizado N.º 15 "Calama")
    - 10th Artillery Group "Borgoño" (Grupo de Artillería N.º 10 "Borgoño")
    - 1st Engineer Battalion "Atacama" (Batallón de Ingenieros N.º 1 "Atacama")
    - Armored Squadron (Escuadrón Blindado)
    - Garrison Unit (Unidad de Cuartel)
  - 3rd Armored Brigade "La Concepción" (3.ª Brigada Acorazada "La Concepción") in Antofagasta
    - 7th Armored Infantry Battalion "Esmeralda" (Batallón de Infantería Blindado N.º 7 "Esmeralda")
    - 8th Armored Group "Exploradores" (Grupo Blindado N.º 8 "Exploradores")
    - 5th Self-propelled Artillery Group "Antofagasta" (Grupo de Artillería Autopropulsada N.º 5 "Antofagasta")
    - 10th Mechanized Engineer Company "Pontoneros" (Compañía de Ingenieros Mecanizada N.º 10 "Pontoneros")
    - 7th Signal Company "San Pedro de Atacama" (Compañía de Telecomunicaciones N.º 7 "San Pedro de Atacama")
    - Armored Reconnaissance Platoon (Pelotón de Exploración Blindado)
  - 23rd Infantry Regiment "Copiapo" (Regimiento N.º 23 "Copiapó") in Copiapó
    - 23rd Motorized Infantry Battalion "Atacama" (Batallón de Infantería Motorizado Nº. 23 "Atacama")
    - Anti-tank Company
  - 1st Divisional Logistic Regiment "Tocopilla" (Regimiento Logístico Divisionario N.º 1 "Tocopilla") in Antofagasta
    - Logistic and Administrative Battalion (Batallón Logístico y Administrativo)
    - 1st Signals Battalion "El Loa" (Batallón de Telecomunicaciones N.º 1 "El Loa")
    - Divisional Maintenance Company (Compañía de Mantenimiento Divisionaria)
  - 1st Aviation Platoon "Antofagasta" (Pelotón de Aviación N.º 1 "Antofagasta")in Antofagasta

=== II Motorized Division ===
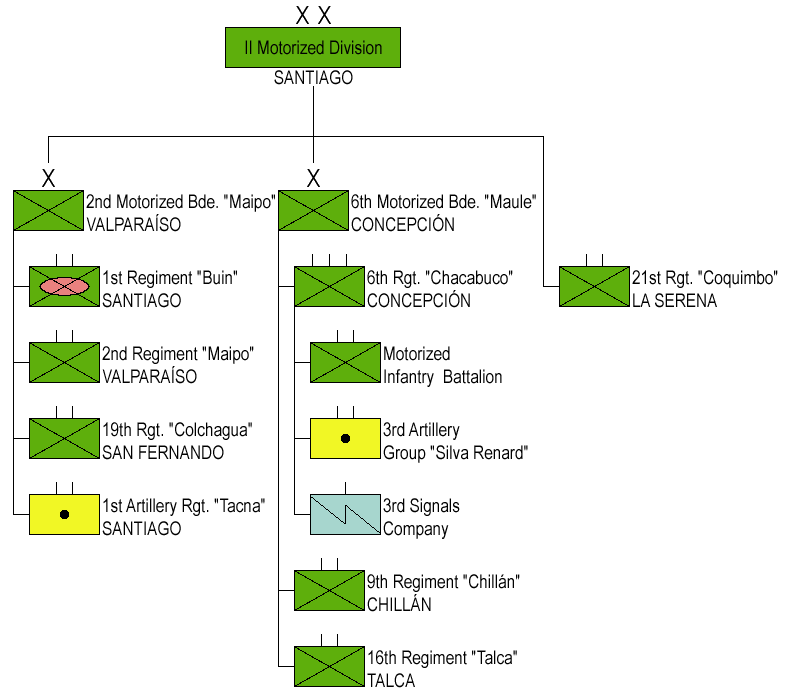
Structure of the II Motorized Division 2019

Responsible for the defense of the Coquimbo, Valparaíso, Santiago, O'Higgins, Maule, and Ñuble regions.

- II Motorized Division, in Santiago
  - 1st Infantry Regiment "Buin" (Regimiento de Infantería N.º 1 "Buin") in Recoleta
    - 1st Mechanized Infantry Battalion "Buin" (Batallón de Infantería Mecanizado N.º 1 "Buin")
    - Anti-tank Company
  - 2nd Infantry Regiment "Maipo" (Regimiento N.º 2 "Maipo") in Valparaíso
    - Motorized Infantry Battalion
    - Anti-tank Company
  - 19th Infantry Regiment "Colchagua" (Regimiento N.º 19 "Colchagua") in San Fernando
    - 19th Motorized Infantry Battalion "Colchagua" (Batallón de Infanteria Motorizado N.º 19 "Colchagua")
    - Anti-tank Company
  - 1st Artillery (Training) Regiment "Tacna" (Regimiento de Artillería N.º 1 "Tacna") in San Bernardo
    - 1st Artillery Group "Tacna" (Grupo de Artillería N.º 1 "Tacna")
      - State Horse Artillery Battery
  - 6th Infantry Regiment "Chacabuco" (Regimiento N.º 6 "Chacabuco") in Concepción
    - 6th Motorized Infantry Battalion "Chacabuco" (Batallón de Infanteria Motorizado N.º 6 "Chacabuco")
    - 3rd Artillery Group "Silva Renard" (Grupo de Artillería N.º 3 "Silva Renard")
    - 4th Logistic and Administrative Company "Concepción" (Compañía Logística y Administrativa N.º 4 "Concepción")
    - Military Police Company (Compañía de Policia Militar)
    - Garrison Unit (Unidad de Cuartel)
    - Regimental General Staff (Plana mayor del Regimiento)
    - Historical Company
  - 9th Infantry Regiment "Chillán" (Regimiento N.º 9 "Chillán") in Chillán
    - 9th Motorized Infantry Battalion "Chillán" (Batallón de Infantería Motorizado N.º 9 "Chillán")
    - Anti-tank Company
  - 16th Infantry Regiment "Talca" (Regimiento N.º 16 "Talca") in Talca
    - 16th Motorized Infantry Battalion "Talca" (Batallón de Infanteria Motorizado N.º 16 "Talca")
    - Anti-tank Company
  - 21st Infantry Regiment "Coquimbo" (Regimiento N.º 21 "Coquimbo") in La Serena
    - Motorized Infantry Battalion
    - Anti-tank Company

=== III Mountain Division ===
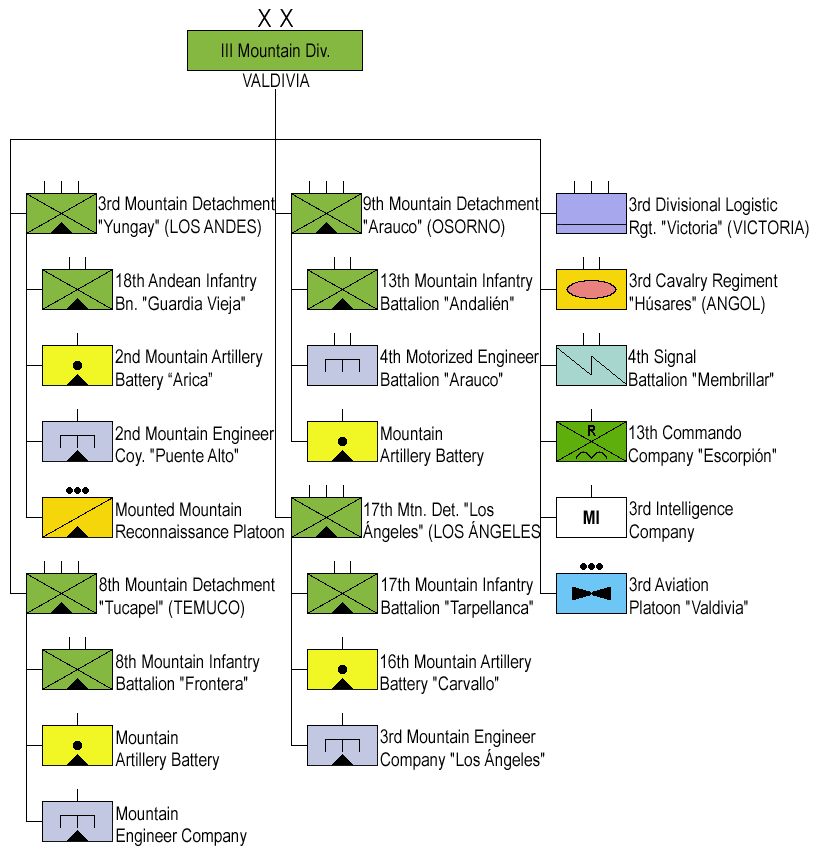
Structure of the III Mountain Division 2019

Responsible for the defense of the Biobío, Los Lagos, Araucanía, and Los Ríos regions, especially in the mountains in the country's eastern borders.

- III Mountain Division, in Valdivia
  - Army Mountain School (Escuela de Montaña del Ejército de Chile) in Rio Blanco
  - 3rd Mountain Detachment "Yungay" (Destacamento de Montaña N.º 3 "Yungay") in Los Andes
    - 18th Andean Infantry Battalion "Guardia Vieja" (Batallón de Infantería Andino N.º 18 "Guardia Vieja")
    - 2nd Mountain Artillery Battery "Arica" (Batería de Artillería de Montaña N.º 2 "Arica")
    - 2nd Mountain Engineer Company "Puente Alto" (Compañía de Ingenieros de Montaña N.º 2 "Puente Alto")
    - Mounted Mountain Reconnaissance Platoon (Pelotón de Exploración Montado de Montaña)
    - Signal Section "Los Andes" (Sección de Telecomunicaciones "Los Andes")
  - 8th Mountain Detachment "Tucapel" (Destacamento de Montaña N.º 8 "Tucapel") in Temuco
    - 8th Mountain Infantry Battalion "Frontera" (Batallón de Infantería de Montaña N.º 8 "Frontera")
    - 17th Mountain Artillery Battery "Urízar" (Batería de Artillería de Montaña N.°17 "Urizar")
    - 13th Mountain Engineer Company "Temuco" (Compañía de Ingenieros de Montaña N.° 13 "Temuco")
    - Signal Section (Sección de Telecomunicaciones)
    - 2nd Barracks "Lonquimay" (Cuartel N.° 2 "Lonquimay") in Lonquimay
  - 9th Mountain Detachment "Arauco" (Destacamento de Montaña N.º 9 "Arauco") in Osorno
    - 13th Mountain Infantry Battalion "Andalién" (Batallón de Infantería de Montaña N.º 13 "Andalién")
    - 4th Motorized Engineer Battalion "Arauco" (Batallón de Ingenieros Motorizados N.º 4 "Arauco")
    - 12th Mountain Engineer Company "Tronador" (Compañía de Ingenieros de Montaña N.º 12 "Tronador")
    - 2nd Mountain Artillery Battery "Maturana" (Batería de Artillería de Montaña N.° 2 "Maturana")
    - Signal Section (Sección de Telecomunicaciones)
    - Garrison Unit (Unidad de Cuartel)
    - 2nd Barracks "La Unión" (Cuartel N.° 2 "La Unión") in La Unión
  - 17th Mountain Detachment "Los Ángeles" (Destacamento de Montaña N.º 17 "Los Ángeles") in Los Ángeles
    - 17th Mountain Infantry Battalion "Tarpellanca" (Batallón de Infantería de Montaña N.º 17 "Tarpellanca")
    - 16th Mountain Artillery Battery "Carvallo" (Batería de Artillería de Montaña N.º 16 "Carvallo")
    - 3rd Mountain Engineer Company "Los Ángeles" (Compañía de Ingenieros de Montaña N.º 3 "Los Ángeles")
    - Signal Section (Sección de Telecomunicaciones)
    - Garrison Unit (Unidad de Cuartel)
  - 3rd Cavalry Regiment (Mountain) "Húsares" (Regimiento de Caballería N.º 3 "Húsares") in Angol
    - Mounted Group "Húsares" (Grupo Montado "Húsares")
  - 3rd Logistic Regiment "Victoria" (Regimiento Logístico N.º 3 "Victoria") in Victoria
    - 3rd Logistic and Administrative Battalion "Victoria" (Batallón Logístico y Administrativo N.° 3 "Victoria")
  - 4th Signal Battalion "Membrillar" (Batallón de Telecomunicaciones N.º 4 "Membrillar") in Valdivia
  - 13th Commando Company "Escorpión" (Compañía de Comandos N.º 13 "Escorpión") in Valdivia
  - 3rd Aviation Platoon "Valdivia" (Pelotón de Aviación N.º 3 "Valdivia") in Valdivia
  - 12th Infantry Regiment "Sangra" (Regimiento N.° 12 "Sangra") in Puerto Varas
    - 12th Motorized Infantry Battalion "Sangra" (Batallón de Infantería Motorizado N.° 12 "Sangra")
    - Anti-tank Company

=== IV Division ===
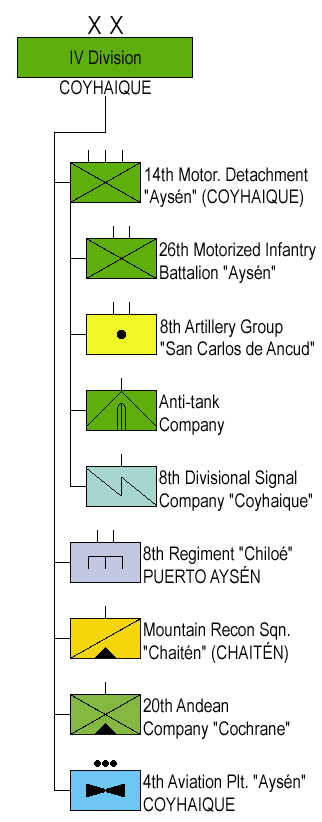
Structure of the IV Division 2019

Responsible for the defense of the Aysén region.

- IV Division, in Coyhaique
  - 14th Motorized Detachment "Aysén" (Destacamento Motorizado N.º 14 "Aysén") in Coyhaique
    - 26th Motorized Infantry Battalion "Aysén" (Batallón de Infantería Motorizado N.º 26 "Aysén")
    - 8th Artillery Group "San Carlos de Ancud" (Grupo de Artillería N.° 8 "San Carlos de Ancud")
    - Anti-tank Company
    - 4th Divisional Logistic and Administrative Company "Coyhaique" (Compañía Logística y Administrativa Divisionaria N.º 4 "Coyhaique")
  - 8th Signal Divisional Company "Coyhaique" (Compañia de Telecomunicaciones Divisionaria N.° 8 "Coyhaique") in Coyhaique
  - 8th Engineers Regiment "Chiloé" (Regimiento N.º 8 "Chiloé") in Puerto Aysén
    - 8th Motorized Engineers Battalion "Chiloé" (Batallón de Ingenieros Motorizado N.º 8 "Chiloé")
  - Mountain Reconnaissance Squadron "Chaitén" (Escuadrón de Exploración Montado "Chaitén") in Chaitén
  - 20th Andean Divisional Company "Cochrane" (Compañía Andina Divisionaria N.º 20 "Cochrane") in Cochrane
  - 4th Aviation Platoon "Aysén" (Pelotón de Aviación N.º 4 "Aysén")

=== V Division ===
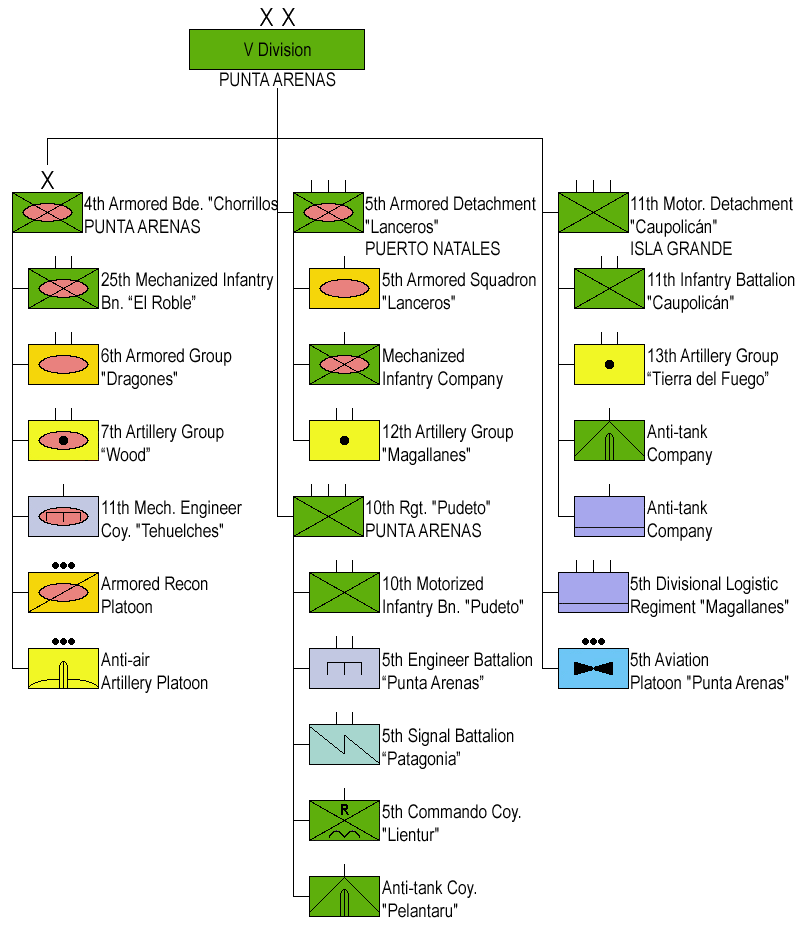
Structure of the V Division 2019

Responsible for the defense of the Magallanes region, which includes the world's southernmost city of Punta Arenas.

- V Army Division, in Punta Arenas
  - 4th Armored Brigade "Chorrillos" (Brigada Acorazada N.º 4 "Chorrillos) in Punta Arenas
    - 6th Armored Group "Dragones" (Grupo Blindado N.º 6 "Dragones")
    - 25th Mechanized Infantry Battalion "El Roble" (Batallón de Infantería Mecanizado N.º 25 "El Roble")
    - 7th Artillery Group "Wood" (Grupo de Artillería N.º 7 "Wood")
    - 11th Mechanized Engineer Company "Tehuelches" (Compañía de Ingenieros Mecanizados N.º 11 "Tehuelches")
    - Armored Reconnaissance Platoon (Pelotón de Exploración Blindado)
    - Air Defense Artillery Platoon (Pelotón de Artillería Antiaérea)
  - 5th Armored Detachment "Lanceros" (Destacamento Acorazado N.º 5 "Lanceros") in Puerto Natales
    - 5th Armored Squadron "Lanceros" (Escuadrón Blindado N.º 5 "Lanceros")
    - Mechanized Infantry Company (Compañía de Infantería Mecanizada)
    - 12th Independent Artillery Battery "Magallanes" (Batería de Artillería Independiente N.º 12 "Magallanes")
  - 10th Infantry Regiment "Pudeto" (Regimiento N.º 10 "Pudeto") in Punta Arenas
    - 10th Motorized Infantry Battalion "Pudeto" (Batallón de Infantería Motorizada N.º 10 "Pudeto")
    - 5th Engineer Battalion "Punta Arenas" (Batallón de Ingenieros N.º 5 "Punta Arenas")
    - 5th Signal Battalion "Patagonia" (Batallón de Telecomunicaciones N.º 5 "Patagonia")
    - Anti-tank Company "Pelantaru" (Compañía Antiblindaje "Pelantaru")
    - 5th Commando Company "Lientur" (Compañía de Comandos N.º 5 "Lientur")
  - 11th Motorized Detachment "Caupolicán" (Destacamento Motorizado N.º 11 "Caupolicán") in Isla Grande de Tierra del Fuego
    - 11th Infantry Battalion "Caupolicán" (Batallón de Infantería N.º 11 "Caupolicán")
    - 13th Independent Artillery Battery "Tierra del Fuego" (Batería de Artillería Independiente N.º 13 "Tierra del Fuego")
    - Anti-tank Company, (Compañía Antiblindaje)
    - Logistic Company, (Compañía Logística)
  - 5th Divisional Logistic Regiment "Magallanes" (Regimiento Logístico Divisionario N.º 5 "Magallanes") in Punta Arenas
    - Maintenance Company (Compañía de Maestranza)
    - Military Police Divisional Section (Sección de Policia Militar Divisionaria)
    - Garrison Unit (Unidad de Cuartel)
  - 5th Aviation Platoon "Punta Arenas" (Pelotón de Aviación N.º 5 "Punta Arenas")
  - Antarctic Studies Center of the Army (Centro de Estudios Antárticos del Ejército)
    - Army Base "Gen. Bernardo O'Higgins" (Base del Ejército "Gen. Bernardo O'Higgins")

=== VI Division ===
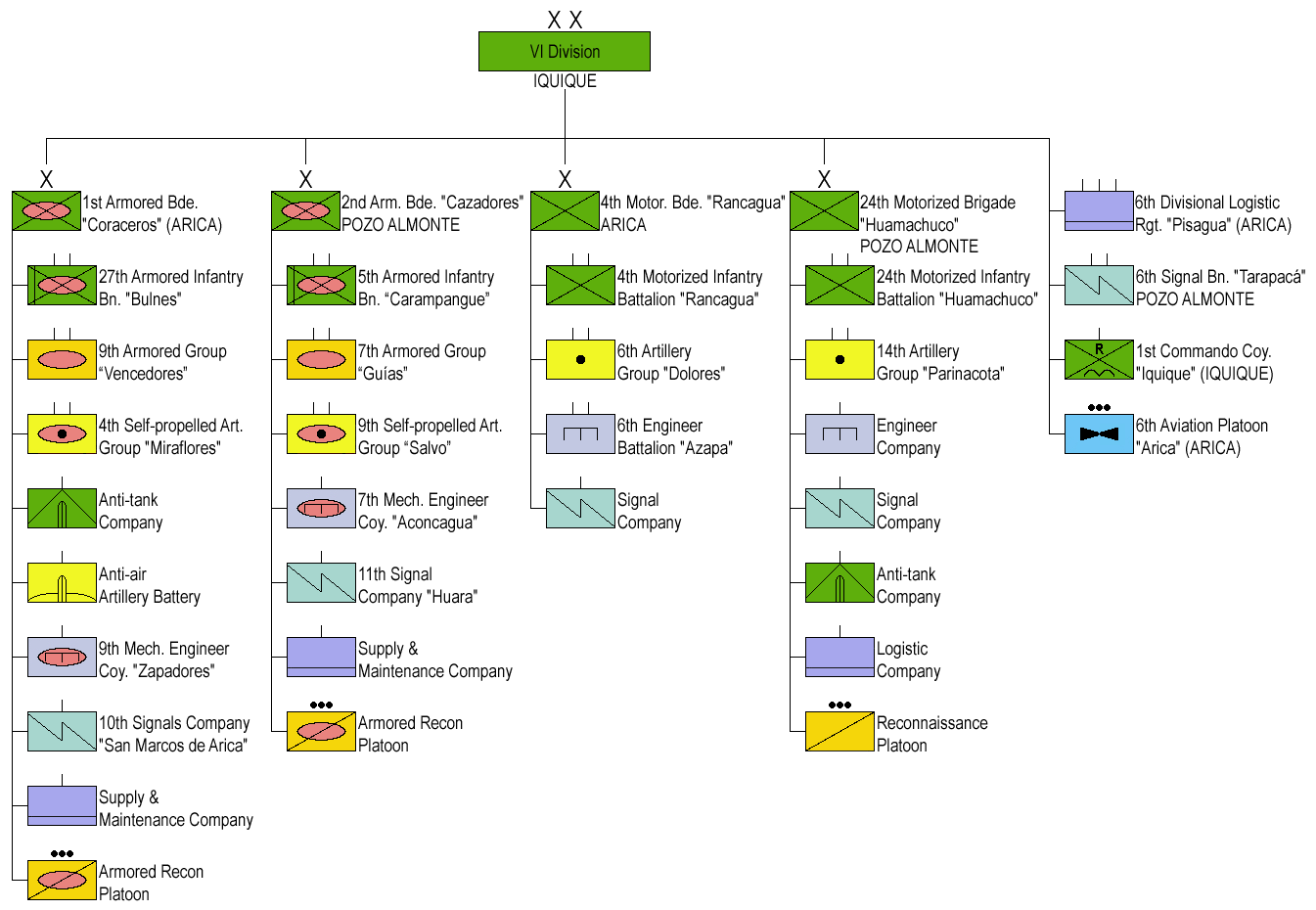
Structure of the VI Division 2019

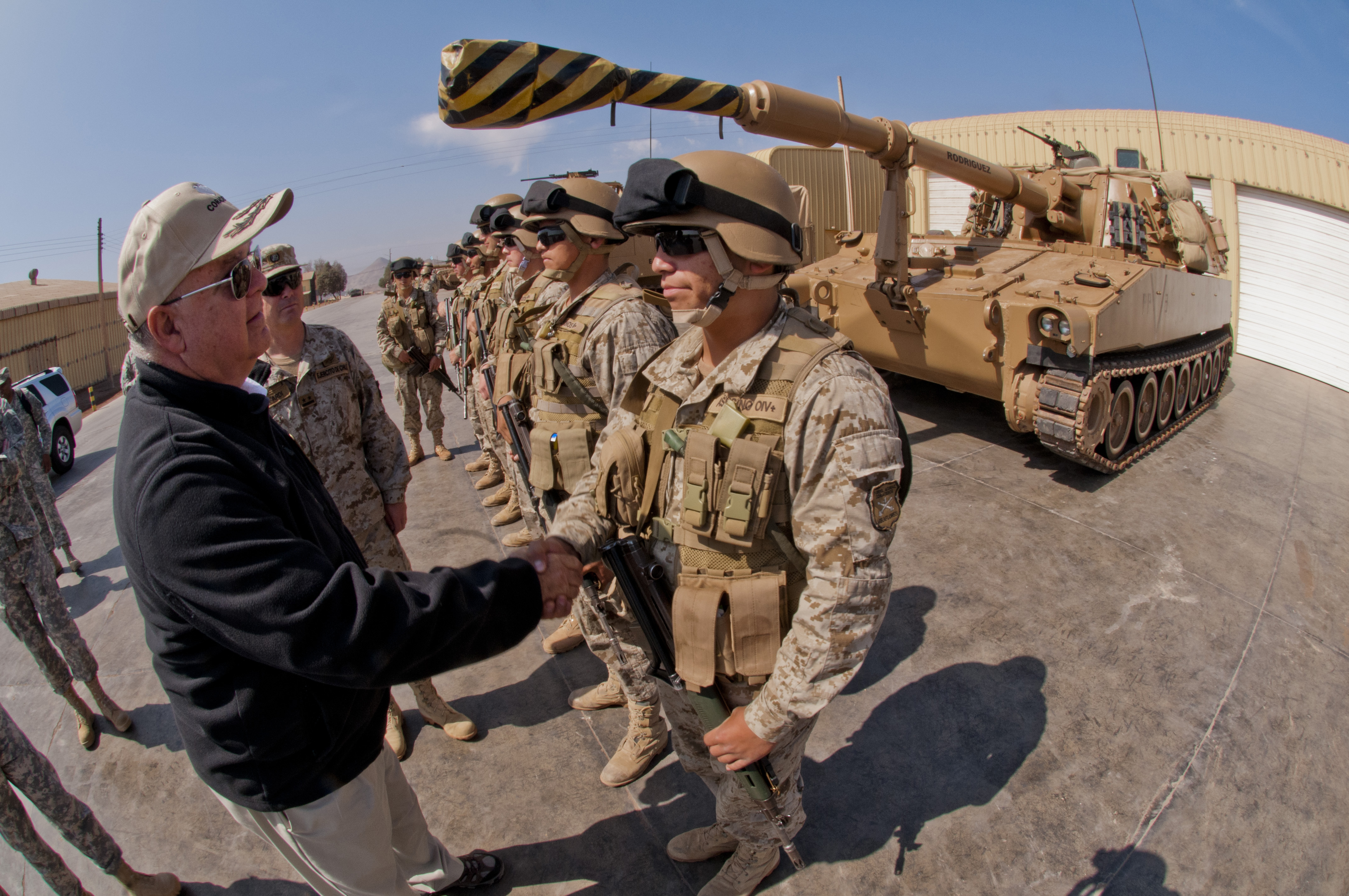
U.S. Army Under Secretary Joseph Westphal shakes hands with Chilean soldiers at VI Division headquarters, June 12, 2012

Responsible for the defense of the Arica y Parinacota and Tarapacá regions.

- VI Division, in Iquique
  - 1st Armored Brigade "Coraceros" (1.ª Brigada Acorazada "Coraceros") in Arica
    - 27th Armored Infantry Battalion "Bulnes" (Batallón de Infantería Blindado N.º 27 "Bulnes")
    - 9th Armored Group "Vencedores" (Grupo Blindado N.º 9 "Vencedores")
    - 4th Self-propelled Artillery Group "Miraflores" (Grupo de Artillería Autopropulsada N.º 4 "Miraflores")
    - Anti-tank Company (Compañía Antiblindaje)
    - Anti-air Artillery Battery (Batería de Artillería Antiaérea)
    - 9th Mechanized Engineer Company "Zapadores" (Compañía de Ingenieros Mecanizada N.º 9 "Zapadores")
    - 10th Signal Company "San Marcos de Arica" (Compañía de Telecomunicaciones N.º 10 "San Marcos de Arica")
    - Supply and Maintenance Company (Compañía de Abastecimiento y Mantenimiento)
    - Armored Reconnaissance Platoon (Pelotón de Exploración Blindado)
  - 2nd Armored Brigade "Cazadores" (2.ª Brigada Acorazada "Cazadores") in Pozo Almonte
    - 5th Armored Infantry Battalion "Carampangue", (Batallón de Infantería Blindado N.º 5 "Carampangue")
    - 7th Armored Group "Guías" (Grupo Blindado N.º 7 "Guías")
    - 9th Self-propelled Artillery Group "Salvo" (Grupo de Artillería Autopropulsada N.º 9 "Salvo")
    - 7th Mechanized Engineer Company "Aconcagua" (Compañía de Ingenieros Mecanizada N.º 7 "Aconcagua")
    - 11th Signal Company "Valparaíso" (Compañía de Telecomunicaciones N.º 11 "Valparaíso")
    - Armored Reconnaissance Platoon (Pelotón de Exploración Blindado)
    - Supply and Maintenance Company (Compañía de Abastecimiento y Mantenimiento)
  - 4th Motorized Brigade "Rancagua" (Brigada Motorizada N.º 4 "Rancagua") in Arica
    - 4th Motorized Infantry Battalion "Rancagua" (Batallón de Infantería Motorizada N.º 4 "Rancagua")
    - 6th Artillery Group "Dolores" (Grupo de Artillería N.º 6 "Dolores")
    - 6th Engineer Battalion "Azapa" (Batallón de Ingenieros N.º 6 "Azapa")
    - Signal Platoon (Pelotón de Telecomunicaciones)
    - Historical Company
    - 2nd Barracks "Coronel Pedro Lagos Marchant" (Cuartel N.° 2 "Coronel Pedro Lagos Marchant")
  - 24th Motorized Brigade "Huamachuco" (Brigada Motorizada N.º 24 "Huamachuco") in Putre
    - 24th Motorized Infantry Battalion "Huamachuco" (Batallón de Infantería Motorizado N.º 24 "Huamachuco")
    - 14th Artillery Group "Parinacota" (Grupo de Artillería N.º 14 "Parinacota")
    - Reconnaissance Platoon (Pelotón de Exploración Terrestre)
    - Anti-tank Company (Compañía Antiblindaje)
    - Engineer Company (Compañía de Ingenieros)
    - Signal Company (Compañía de Telecomunicaciones)
    - Logistic Company (Compañía Logística)
    - 2nd Barracks "Mayor Fontecilla" (Cuartel N.° 2 "Mayor Fontecilla") in Arica
  - 6th Divisional Logistic Regiment "Pisagua" (Regimiento Logístico Divisionario Nº 6 "Pisagua") in Arica
  - 6th Signal Battalion "Tarapacá" (Batallón de Telecomunicaciones N° 6 "Tarapacá") in Pozo Almonte
  - 6th Aviation Platoon "Arica" (Pelotón de Aviación Nº 6 "Arica") in Arica

== Special Operations Command ==
=== Special Operations Brigade ===
- Lautaro Special Operations Brigade (Brigada de Operaciones Especiales "Lautaro") in Peldehue
  - 1st Paratroopers Battalion "Pelantaru" (Batallón de Paracaidistas N.º 1 "Pelantaru")
  - Army Special Forces Group (Agrupación de Fuerzas Especiales del Ejército)
  - Mountain Special Group (Agrupación Especial de Montaña)
  - Paratroopers and Special Forces School (Escuela de Paracaidistas y Fuerzas Especiales)
  - 5th Commando Group "Lientur" (Agrupación de Comandos N.º 5 "Lientur") in Punta Arenas
  - 6th Commando Group "Leucotón" (Agrupación de Comandos N.º 6 "Leucotón") in Pozo Almonte
  - 12th Commando Group "Galvarino" (Agrupación de Comandos N.º 12 "Galvarino")
  - Logistic Company (Compañía Logística)

=== Army Aviation Brigade ===
- Army Aviation Brigade (Brigada de Aviación) in Rancagua
  - Fixed-Wing Aircraft Battalion "La Independencia" (Batallón de Aviones "La Independencia")
  - Rotary-Wing Aircraft Battalion "Germania" (Batallón de Helicópteros "Germania")
  - Aviation Maintenance and Supply Battalion (Batallón Mantenimiento y Abastecimiento de Aviación)
  - Airport Company (Compañía Aeropuerto)
  - Army Aviation School (Escuela de Aviación Ejército)
  - 5x Aviation platoons detached to each army division

=== Intelligence Brigade ===
- 1st Intelligence Regiment "Soberanía" (Regimiento de Inteligencia N.° 1 "Soberanía") in Providencia
- 2nd Intelligence Regiment "Llaitún" (Regimiento de Inteligencia N.° 2 "Llaitún") in Peñalolen
  - Cyber defense Battalion
- Intelligence Group "Arica" in Arica
- Intelligence Group "Iquique" in Iquique
- Intelligence Group "Antofagasta" in Antofagasta
- Intelligence Group "Concepción" in Concepción
- Intelligence Group "Valdivia" in Valdivia
- Intelligence Group "Coyhaique" in Coyhaique
- Intelligence Group "Punta Arenas" in Punta Arenas

== Doctrine Command ==
Army Institution and Doctrine Command (Commando Instituto y Doctrina)

- Army Schools Division (Division Escuelas)
  - Bernardo O'Higgins Military Academy in Las Condes
  - Army NCO School Sergeant Daniel Rebolledo Sepulveda in Maipú
  - Army War College in La Reina
  - Military Polytechnical Academy in La Reina
  - Army Infantry School General Jose de San Martin in San Bernardo
  - Army Signals School in Peñalolen
  - Army Engineering School in San Antonio
  - Army Services and Physical Education School in La Reina
  - Army Airborne and Special Forces School in Peldehue
- Army Education Division (Division de Educacion)
- Army Doctrine Division (Division de Doctrina)

== Force Support Command ==
Army Force Support Services Command (Commando Apoyo de la Fuerza)

- Army Logistic Division, (División Logística del Ejército) in Santiago
  - 1st Logistic Regiment "Bellavista" (Regimiento Logístico de Ejército N.º 1 "Bellavista") in Conchalí
    - 1st Transport Battalion "Huelén" (Batallón de Transporte N.° 1 "Huelén")
    - 1st Supply Battalion "Pucará" (Batallón de Abastecimiento N.° 1 "Pucará")
    - Ordnance Supply and Quartermaster Company (Compañía de Abastecimiento de Material y Equipo de Intendencia)
    - Veterinary Company (Compañía de Veterinaria)
  - 2nd Logistic Regiment "Arsenales de Guerra" (Regimiento Logístico de Ejército N.º 2 "Arsenales de Guerra") in Peldehue
    - Supply Battalion
    - Garrison Unit
    - 2nd Barracks "Batuco" (Cuartel N.° 2 "Batuco") in Batuco
  - 3rd Logistic Regiment "Limache" (Regimiento Logístico de Ejército N.º 3 "Limache") in Renca
    - Maintenance Battalion
- Army Engineering Command (Commando de Ingenieros)
  - Military Workers Corps (Cuerpo Militar del Trabajo) in Santiago
  - Army Engineering Service
- Army Communications Command
- Army Infrastructure Command
- Army Military Engineering and Industry Command
  - FAMAE Arms Factory in Talagante
  - Military Geography Institute in Santiago
  - Investigation and Control Institute in Santiago

== General Garrison Command ==
- Army General Garrison Command in Santiago, serving the Santiago Metropolitan Region, reports directly to Army Headquarters
  - 1st Cavalry (Horse Guards) Regiment "Grenadiers" (Regimiento Escolta Presidencial N.º1 "Granaderos") in Quillota, the former headquarters of the Army Armored Cavalry School, also functions as the Presidential Escort Regiment since 1840. Name attributes to the Argentine Regiment of Mounted Grenadiers "Gen. Jose De San Martin" and Ecuador's Tarqui Grenadiers and Tapi Grenadiers Regiments
    - Mounted Ceremonial Squadron
    - Honors Squadron
    - Training Center
  - 1st Military Police Regiment "Santiago" (Regimiento de Policía Militar N.º 1 "Santiago")
    - Military Police Battalion
    - Garrison and Logistic Unit
    - Canine Training Center
    - 2nd Barracks "Lo Aguirre" (Cuartel N.° 2 "Lo Aguirre") in Pudahuel

== Army Medical Command ==
- Army Medical Command in Santiago
  - Santiago Military Hospital (Hospital Militar de Santiago)
  - Northern Military Hospital in Antofagasta
  - Children's Rehabilitation Center
- Army Administration Command

== Graphic overview of the Chilean Army ==
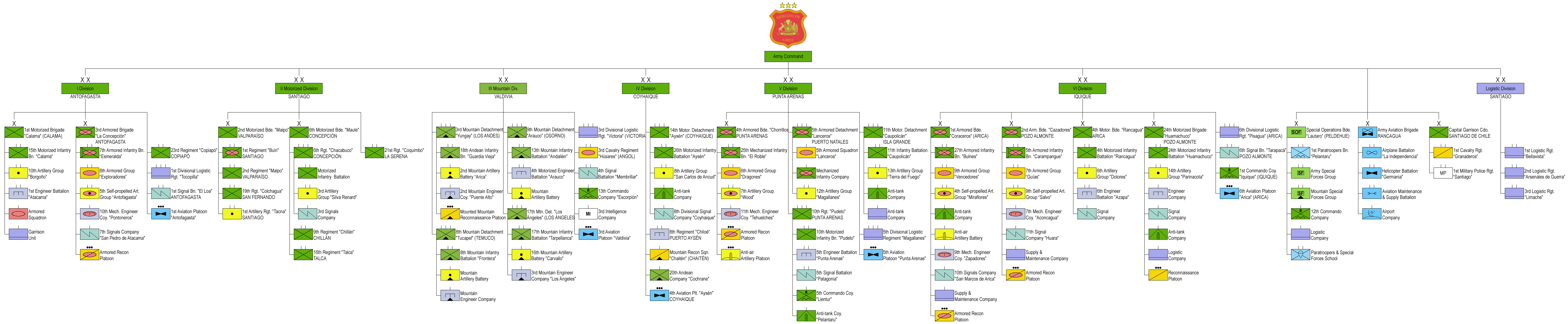
Structure of the Chilean Army 2019 (click on image to enlarge)

== Geographic distribution of operational forces ==
Divisions, brigades and detachments of the Chilean Army in 2020

== Unit names ==
All infantry units and most of the artillery regiments are named after important battles or places in Chile, while the cavalry regiments are named after the various types of cavalry. These are the units:

- 1st Infantry: Battle of Buin Bridge
- 2nd Infantry: Battle of Maipu
- 8th Infantry: Battle of Tucapel
- 12th Infantry: Battle of Sangra
- 21st Infantry: Battle of Copiapo
- 24th Infantry: Battle of Huamachuco
- 3rd Mountain: Battle of Yungay
- 4th Brigade: Battle of Rancagua
- 6th Infantry: Battle of Chacabuco
- 17th Reinforced: Battle of Los Angeles
- 3rd Brigade: Battle of La Concepcion
- 1st Cavalry: Horse Grenadiers
- 3rd Cavalry: Hussars
- 5th Cavalry: Lancers
- 8th Cavalry: Scouts/Explorers
- 1st Armored Brigade: Cuirassiers
- 2nd Armored Brigade: Horse Rifleman/Horse Rifle Hunter
- 6th ACG: Dragoons
- 1st Artillery: Battle of Tacna
- 2nd Artillery: Battle of Arica
- 4th Artillery: Battle of Miraflores
- 8th Artillery: Battle of San Carlos de Ancud
- Helicopter Battalion: Battle of Pampa Germania
- 8th Engineer: Battle of Chiloé
