= 2nd Armoured Brigade =

2nd Armoured Brigade or 2nd Armored Brigade may refer to:

- 2nd Armoured Brigade (Australia)
- 2nd Armored Brigade (Chile)
- 2nd Armoured Brigade (France)
- 2nd Armoured Brigade (Poland)
- 2nd Armoured Brigade (United Kingdom)
- 2nd Canadian Armoured Brigade

== See also ==
- 2nd Brigade (disambiguation)
