= José Luis Araneda Carrasco =

Chilean Army officer (1848–1912)

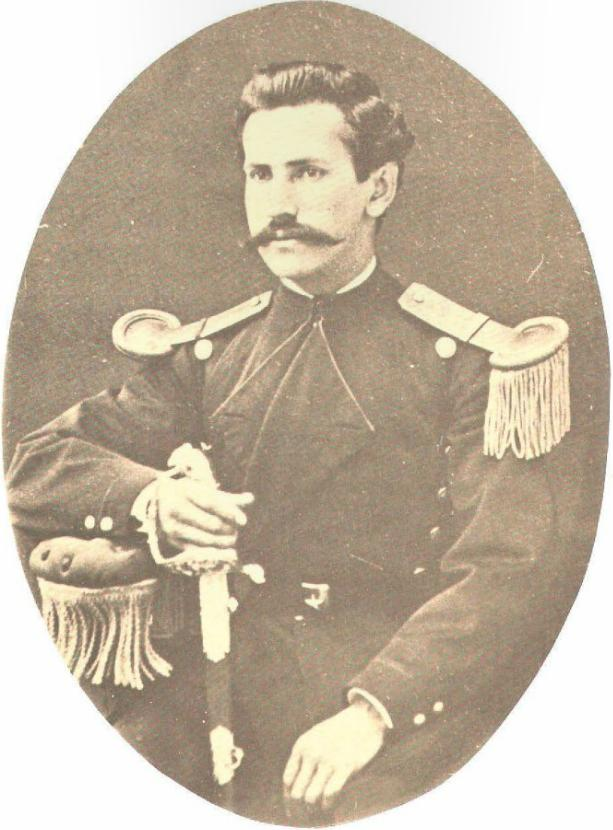
- Born: August 28, 1848
- Died: January 19, 1912 (aged 63)
- Occupation: Chilean Army officer
- Known for: fought in the War of the Pacific

José Luis Araneda Carrasco (August 28, 1848 – January 19, 1912) was a Chilean Army officer. He enlisted in the army at the age of 17, during the Chincha Islands War and was quickly promoted, receiving a commission in 1871. During the War of the Pacific he was wounded while capturing 45 prisoners in the Battle of Pisagua and held an isolated post against superior forces during the Battle of Sángrar. In his later career he served as an aide-de-camp to the Chamber of Deputies of Chile.

== Early life and service ==
Carrasco was born in Chillán Viejo on August 28, 1848, to a family of farmers. During the early part of the Chincha Islands War with Spain, when he was 17 years old, he enlisted into the 70th Line Battalion with many of his schoolmates. He was promoted successively to the ranks of corporal (1st and 2nd class) and sergeant (1st and 2nd class). Between 1867 and 1871 he served in the Occupation of Araucanía. Carrasco received a commission as second lieutenant on July 28, 1871; he transferred to the 1st Line Battalion in 1875.

== War of the Pacific ==
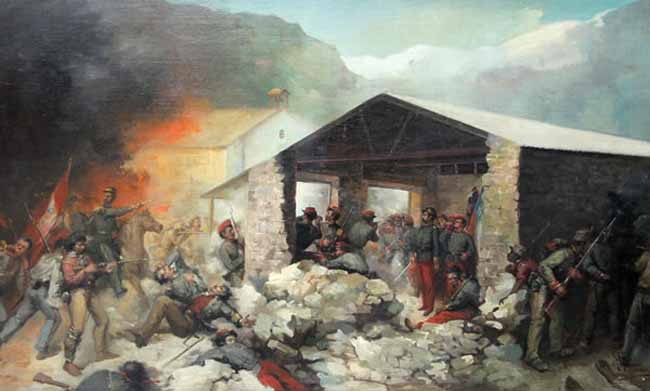
A depiction of the Battle of Sángrar

Carrsco served in the 1879-1884 War of the Pacific with Peru and Bolivia and was wounded in the left hand during the Chilean capture of Pisagua, during which he personally took 45 prisoners of war. He later served in the Battle of Tacna, Battle of Arica and Battle of La Rinconada de Ate and was promoted to captain on January 28, 1880. Carrasco was placed in command of 78 men to hold Sángrar, a hamlet in the mountains of Peru. The post was attacked by a force of 800 Peruvian soldiers and indigenous people on June 26, 1881. Carrasco fought a 13-hour defence of the post, while he awaited reinforcements he had sent a rider to summon from Casapalca. The Peruvian forces withdrew around 2am on June 27, upon sighting the reinforcements. Of the defenders, 24 were killed, 18 wounded and 2 taken prisoner.

== Later career ==
By the time of the Chilean Civil War of 1891 Carrasco had reached the rank of lieutenant-colonel. In the aftermath of the war he served as an aide-de-camp to the Chamber of Deputies of Chile. Carrasco was rewarded with promotion to the rank of colonel on February 10, 1908. He died in Santiago on January 19, 1912, and his funeral was held the following day.
