= Colegio Villa María (Peru) =

Private school in La Molina, Lima, Peru

Colegio Villa María Miraflores Colegio Villa María La Planicie

Location
- Calle Contralmirante Montero 225; Av. La Laguna 280; Miraflores, La Molina, Lima; Peru

Information
- Type: Private
- Religious affiliation: Catholicism
- Denomination: Congregation of the Servant Sisters of the Immaculate Heart of Mary
- Patron saint: Immaculate Heart of Mary
- Established: 1923; 103 years ago
- Principal: Pilar Grados
- Grades: K-11
- Gender: Girls
- Enrollment: c. 1,000
- Language: English; Spanish
- Campus: Suburban
- Colors: Red, blue and white
- Nickname: Villamarian
- Accreditation: Ministry of Education
- Yearbook: Golden
- Website: www.vmm.edu.pe (Miraflores); http://www.vmaria.pe (La Planicie)

Villa María School is a private Catholic primary and secondary school for girls, located in the city of Lima, Peru. The Peruvian-American school is operated by the Congregation of the Servant Sisters of the Immaculate Heart of Mary, that has its origins in Pennsylvania, United States. The school's teaching is in Spanish and English with a curriculum based on Christian values and the Marian spirit.

== History ==
In 1922, in conversations between the Archbishop of Lima, Monsignor Emilio Lissón, and the Archbishop of Philadelphia, Cardinal Dennis Dougherty, it was agreed to create an English-speaking Catholic school in Lima. Said project was to be entrusted to the religious order, the Servant Sisters of the Immaculate Heart of Mary, who arrived in Peru on December 12 of the same year to begin its realization.

On January 3, 1923 the congregation settled in a rented house and in that same place the first course of what would be the Villa María School began, classes began on March 15 of the same year with eighty students, in mostly girls of primary school age and some boys.

In 1924, land was acquired for the construction of the convent and the school. The works began on August 15, 1925. Then President of Peru, Augusto B. Leguía, was present at the ceremony to lay the first stone, among other personalities of the Peruvian and American government. On March 21, 1926 the facilities were inaugurated. The new building was 5,000 m² and had dormitories for girls, an auditorium with a capacity of more than 1,000 people, study rooms, a large courtyard for recreational purposes, a gym, reception rooms and a library.

On October 14, 1962, construction began on a new school headquarters (La Planicie) in the La Molina District, for secondary education. This center began its activities in 1965.

== Notable alumnae ==
- Cayetana Aljovín, former Minister of Foreign Relations
- María Antonieta Alva, former Minister of Economy and Finance
- Anahí de Cárdenas, actress
- Anna Carina, singer
- Conchita Cintrón, bullfighter
- Flavia Laos, actress and TV personality
- Luciana León, former Member of Congress
- Johanna San Miguel, actress
- Pilar Pallete, actress

== See also ==
- Education in Peru
- Catholic Church in Peru
