= Battle of La Rinconada de Ate =

1881 battle of the War of the Pacific

- Part of Lima campaign of the War of the Pacific
- The battle is indicated by the red dot.
Date	January 9, 1881
Location	La Rinconada, Lima Province, Peru
Result	Chilean victory

Belligerents
Chile	Peru

Commanders and leaders
Orozimbo Barbosa	Mariano Vargas

Strength
Around 2,000 infantry and 2 artillery pieces	330 infantry, cavalry reinforcements and 1 battery

Casualties and losses
1 killed, 10 wounded	Source 1: 7 killed and 8 wounded Source 2: 20 killed and wounded

The Battle of La Rinconada de Ate took place during the Lima campaign of the War of the Pacific. The battle occurred a few days before the Battle of San Juan and Chorrillos due to a surveying conflict.

== Background ==
After the Chilean occupation of southern Peru, and given the impossibility of agreeing on peace, the Chilean government had decided to carry out the Lima campaign. Having prepared the ships and contingents to begin the new campaign, the Chilean forces led by General Manuel Baquedano made landings in the port of Chilca and on the beach of Curayacu in mid-December 1880 and without Peruvian opposition, the Chileans went further inland and later established their camp in the Lurín valley to order his forces and then plan the attack on the Peruvian defenses of the capital organized by General Nicolás de Piérola.

During the stay of the Chilean forces in Lurín, there were some clashes in the surroundings with some local montoneras and outposts of the Peruvian army that were easily defeated or dispersed. In one of these actions, a Peruvian column formed by the Cazadores del Rímac, between 200 and 300 cavalrymen armed with carbines and under the command of Colonel Pedro José Sevilla, was ambushed and captured by some companies of the Curicó regiment led by Colonel Orozimbo Barbosa in the Battle of El Manzano on December 27.

One of the main priorities of the Chilean command in Lurín was to reconnoiter the opposing camp, since there was little information on the positions that the Peruvian forces occupied in San Juan and in other sectors for the defense of Lima. The Chilean command needed to know as much as possible the characteristics of these positions in order to adopt a battle plan, so the exploration missions were entrusted to several officers who were given a few troops to carry out these operations, although some were executed by Baquedano himself in the company of his General Staff. These reconnaissances, in which there were some skirmishes with the Peruvian troops that held the defense lines of the capital, caused two different currents to pronounce on the battle plan in the higher command. The Chilean Minister of War, José Francisco Vergara defended the idea of carrying out an attack through Ate, along the Manchay road to surround the Peruvian army by a flank movement and interpose between it and the capital. On the other hand, Baquedano and his closest circle advocated a frontal attack on the Peruvian positions.

== The Exploration of the Manchay and Ate ==
General Baquedano, considering the possibility of the encircling attack proposed by War Minister Vergara, commissioned Colonel Barbosa to explore the Manchay and Ate road, giving him a strong division of approximately 2,000 men from the three arms. Composed of the 3rd Line Infantry Regiment, a battalion of the Lautaro regiment, a company of the Buin Mounted Regiment, a squadron of Grenadiers on horseback, a platoon of Chasseurs on escort horseback and an artillery unit with 2 Krupp mountain pieces.

In compliance with this commission, Colonel Barbosa left Pachacámac with his division on the afternoon of January 8, 1881, arriving at dusk at the Manchay ravine where he rested his troops. At 1 a.m. he continued the march to arrive at dawn to the places that he had to recognize. His objective was to make a reconnaissance along the road called Cieneguilla, enter the valleys of Lima or Ate and approach the defensive system of the San Bartolomé Hill, located southwest of the Peruvian capital. At about 5 a.m., Barbosa's division entered Pampa Grande and then ran into a "cajon" or portezuelo called Rinconada de Ate, where a Peruvian defensive position was blocking the road to the valley.

== The Defensive Positions ==
In the Rinconada de Ate was the Peruvian colonel Mariano Vargas and his forces that were 330 men with little education, made up of landowners and residents of the area who had been armed with Minié rifles . Vargas's forces were composed of 180 men from the Pachacamác battalion, a squad of 100 men who belonged to the 1st Cavalry Brigade, on foot, and 50 men from the 3rd Mounted Brigade.

Their defensive position consisted of a two meter wide ditch and behind it a parapet. Both extended to their ends, right and left, respectively, from the heights of La Molina and Melgarejo, which were separated by about two kilometers. It also had for its defense several automatic mines installed in strategic positions of the defense.

A short distance from his rear was the reserve battalion No. 14 under the command of Colonel Manuel Pomar and another section of cavalry under the command of Lieutenant Colonel Millán Murga. Also a few leagues to his rear was the heavy caliber battery of the fortified position of Vásquez, which formed part of the defensive system of the Cerro de San Bartolomé.

Colonel Vargas, since his appointment as head of the Ate position, had sent several letters between January 4 and January 6 to Piérola and General Pedro Silva Gil asking for reinforcements to be able to make an adequate defense of the area in case the Chilean army attacked their position. However, his requests were not heeded as an attack in that place was considered unlikely.

== The Battle ==
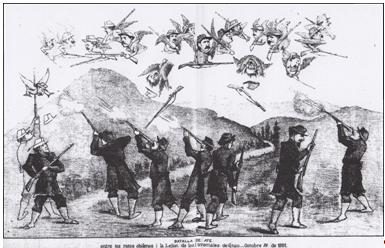
The combat motivated the publication of the political cartoon, titled "El Padre Cobos" on October 29, 1881. The cartoonist mocks "The immortals of Grau", who are eliminated like birds in a hunting session.

The chief of the Chilean General Staff refers to the arrival of Barbosa's division at the Peruvian position in Rinconada de Ate and to the combat in general as follows:

Before going down to the valley, that force found the road blocked by a considerable number of automatic mines that covered the field and exploded under the feet of the troops, at the same time that some enemy guerrillas fired, sheltered behind a triple trench of ditches, which cut the width of the open through which the road turns, while others crowned the heights on either side.The enemy cavalry appeared in the valley behind the infantry, and the cannons of the forts to the south of Lima fired grenades at our ranks.

— Marcos Segundo Maturana, February 9, 1881

The Peruvian position was strong enough to resist a frontal attack, but it could be taken if the slopes on the sides were dominated or an attack was made from the rear making an encircling movement through the hills.

Colonel Barboza first dispatched the Grenadiers on Horseback to explore the area. They soon returned with the news that there were mines in the front and that behind these artifacts was the defensive position in which the Peruvian troops were sheltered, unable to calculate their number as they were hidden. Barboza then decided to carry out an attack at different points. The Chileans move to execute the attack on the position, beginning at 8:30 a.m. but movement was slow due to difficult terrain.

The Chilean commander sent three companies of the 3rd Line Infantry Regiment to advance head-on to the Peruvian position, taking care not to activate the mines, while two companies of the same regiment climbed the height on the right side of the defense, in such a way that from that point they dominated the entire position and the land to their rear. Another company of that regiment made a movement to the left of the portezuelo. Barbosa also ordered Buin's company to support the frontal attack carried out by the three companies of the 3rd Line Infantry and arranged for the artillery servers with their two mountain pieces to cover these units as they advanced. He further ordered that the Horse Grenadiers begin an advance to the left of the Peruvian position so that they would then make a detour through the hills and take the rearguard while the rest of the Chilean troops remained in the reserves.

The enemy was moving on our line, once he became convinced of our lamentable lack of artillery and the small number of our brave defenders. The infantry columns, with little more than two thousand men, were preparing to take the heights of their right, and protected by a large body of cavalry; but they had to delay this operation to be able to get within rifle shot of us, and as was seen later, because of the multitude of ravines that those heights contain.

— Mariano Vargas, January 9, 1881

The Chilean troops that were attacking the front advanced against the Peruvian positions carrying out advancing fire, that is to say, separated into two lines, the first of them fired kneeling on the ground, once the unloading had been completed, the entire line was thrown to the ground, then advancing the second line that, a few meters from the first, performed the same operation. The Peruvian defenders answered the advance of the Chilean troops with heavy fire, but the lack of training of the shooters made it ineffective. Colonel Vargas at that critical moment had requested the help of the 14th Reserve Battalion, which was the closest reinforcements to the positions attacked by the Chileans, but they had superior orders not to engage in combat.

The Peruvian defenders were quickly overwhelmed by the simultaneous advance of the Chileans who were firing at them, and were soon to come to close combat and be totally enveloped by the flanking that the Grenadiers on Horseback were completing by the hill of Melgarejo (or Huaquerones), to fall behind the Peruvian line and cut off their retreat. Colonel Vargas, who understood the fatality of this maneuver for his forces and the futility of engaging in resistance, decided to retreat to the fortified position of Vásquez before the Chilean troops entered the trench. At that time, the cavalry section led by Lieutenant Colonel Millán appeared to protect the retreat of Vargas's forces, which at the beginning of the Chilean attack was more than half a league from Rinconada. In the Peruvian retreat, the Grenadiers on Horseback managed to reach and surround several Peruvian soldiers who ended up falling dead in the attack.

Colonel Barbosa, faced with the general withdrawal of the Peruvians to Vásquez, stopped the advance of his troops so as not to expose them unnecessarily to fire from the battery of that position, which began to fire at them, but to no avail, and so as not to compromise his division against of the entire line of defense of the Peruvian capital. At 11 a.m., the battle ended and Barbosa remained in the position recently taken to gather his troops, treat his wounded, rest and make some observations of the terrain. This continued until 1 p.m. as by then, he undertook the return to the Chilean camp in Lurín.

The Chilean forces suffered 11 wounded by bullets and gunshots from the automatic mines, of which only one soldier later died. Peruvian casualties, despite not being fully verified, can be set at around twenty dead and wounded, most of them due to the final pursuit of the Chilean cavalry.

== Aftermath ==
After the Peruvian withdrawal from its position in Rinconada, the entrance to Lima through Ate was left open for the Chilean expeditionaries for that day. Piérola, who did not believe that the Chileans could arrive through Ate, ordered to reinforce the defenses in that place, which has been made up since then by the 14th Reserve Battalion, the Pachacamác battalion and a company of artillerymen with 4 White guns. On the other hand, the Chilean command had rejected the idea of carrying out the general attack through that sector, considering the journey from Lurín too long, and due to the difficulty of the terrain to mobilize a much larger force than Barbosa had to carry out the exploration. of the area.

Valuable information obtained by the Chileans was achieved with the capture of an administrator of a hacienda in the Ate Valley, an American engineer named Murphy, who gave important scientific details about the Peruvian lines that defended the capital.
