= Nicolás Guzmán Bustamante =

Chilean painter and draftsman

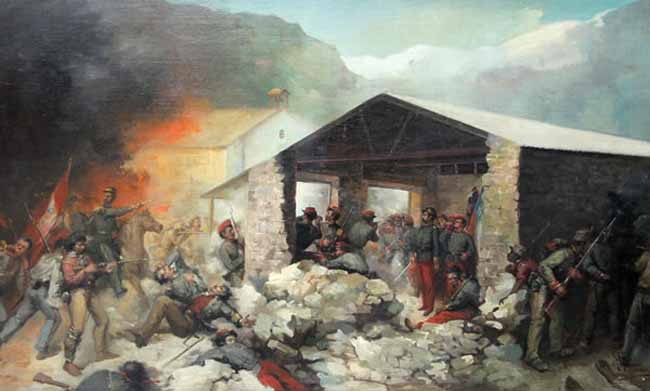
- Combat of Sangra
- Born: Nicolás Guzmán Bustamante; October 1, 1850; Santiago of Chile
- Died: February 12, 1928; Santiago of Chile
- Known for: Painter and draftsman
- Notable work: First Government Board, 1889, oil on canvas
- Movement: Romanticism, realism
- Awards: First medal for the painting 1889 Salon oil on canvas Hundimiento de la Esmeralda; Santiago, Chile

Nicolás Guzmán Bustamante (1850–February 12, 1928) was a Chilean painter and draftsman. His art is categorized as romanticism and realism.

== Biography ==
Guzmán Bustamante, started off as a sculptor and continued as a painter. He was an outstanding student of Antonio Smith and Alejandro Ciccarelli. From a young age, he dedicated himself to painting and at 25 years old he participated in the Chilean International Exhibition of 1875. He was also noted for having done deep studies on artistic anatomy, always excelling in realistic artistic compositions.

The oil on canvas called Hundimiento de la Esmeralda con sus tripulantes en el Combate Naval de Iquique (The Sinking of Emeralda with its crew in the Naval Combat of Iquique), painted in 1882; won first medal and the second prize for oil on canvas called La muerte de Pedro de Valdivia (The death of Pedro de Valdivia).
His pictures, where he stood out thanks to his discrete coloring and historical correctness. His impeccable drawing allowed him to distribute the characters in the rectangle of the canvas with masterly plastic wisdom.

Hundimiento de la Esmeralda con sus tripulantes en el Combate Naval de Iquique was destroyed by the earthquake of 1906 Valparaíso, that caused a fire at the Victoria Theater where this artistic work was exhibited.

== Exhibitions ==
=== Works in public collections ===
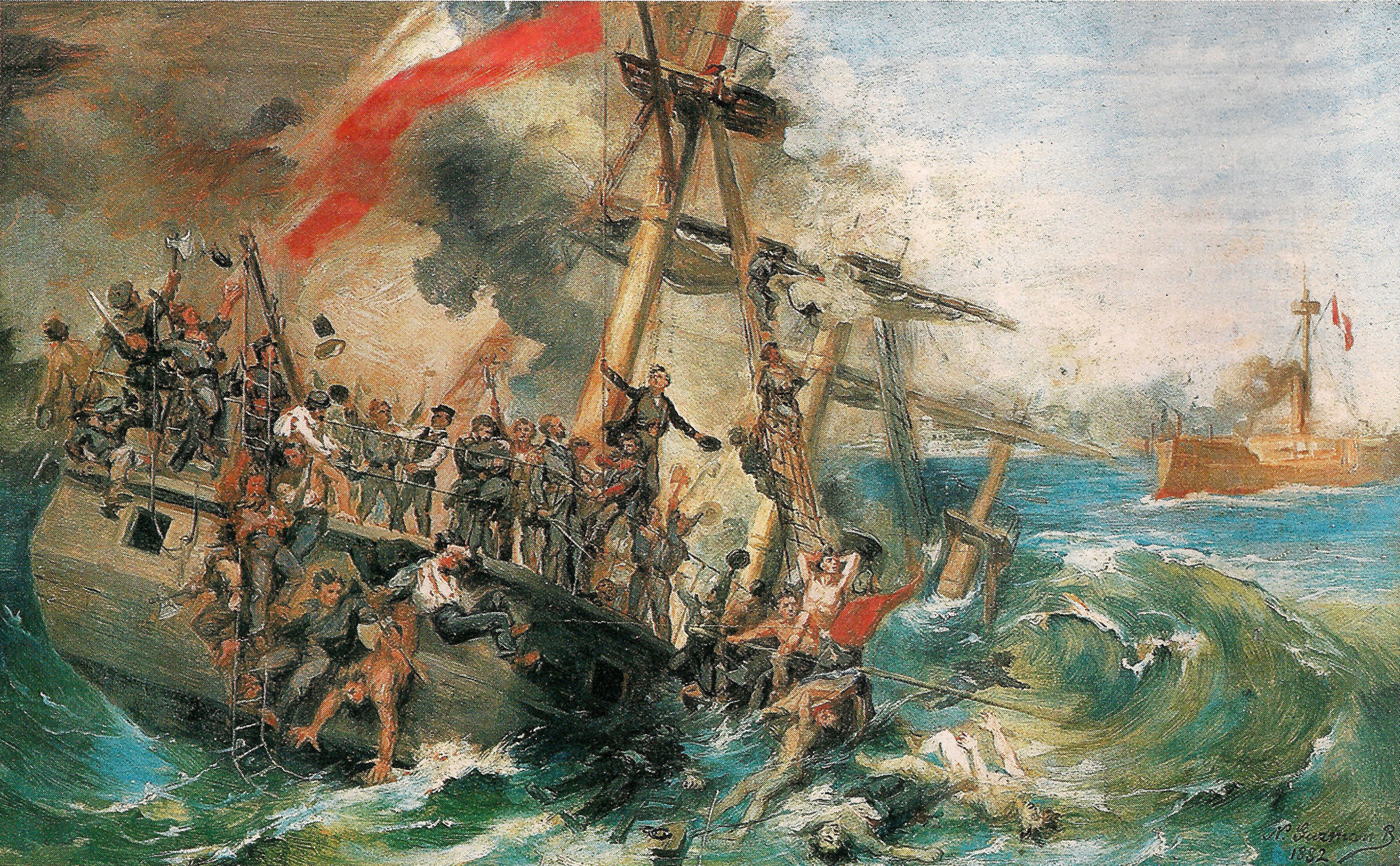
The Sinking of Emeralda with its crew in the Naval Combat of Iquique

- Collectibles National Museum of Fine Arts
  Naval Combat of Iquique, 1882, oil on wood, 31 x 50 cm. On loan to the National Historical Museum since 1975
- Pinacoteca of the Military School of Santiago
  Battle of Bleed, oil on canvas
- National Historical Museum of Santiago de Chile
  First Government Board, 1889, oil on canvas

== Awards and Distinctions ==
- 1872 Honorable Mention. National Exhibition of Arts and Industries, Mercado Central Santiago, Chile.
- 1884 Second Prize, Annual Hall, Santiago, Chile.
- 1889 First place medal, Annual Hall, Santiago, Chile.Hundimiento de la Esmeralda
- 1981 Chilean Painting Rescue, Cultural Institute of Providencia, Santiago.

== See also ==
- Pascual Ortega Portales
- Alberto Orrego Luco
- Álvaro Casanova Zenteno
- Eugenio Cruz Vargas

== Bibliography ==
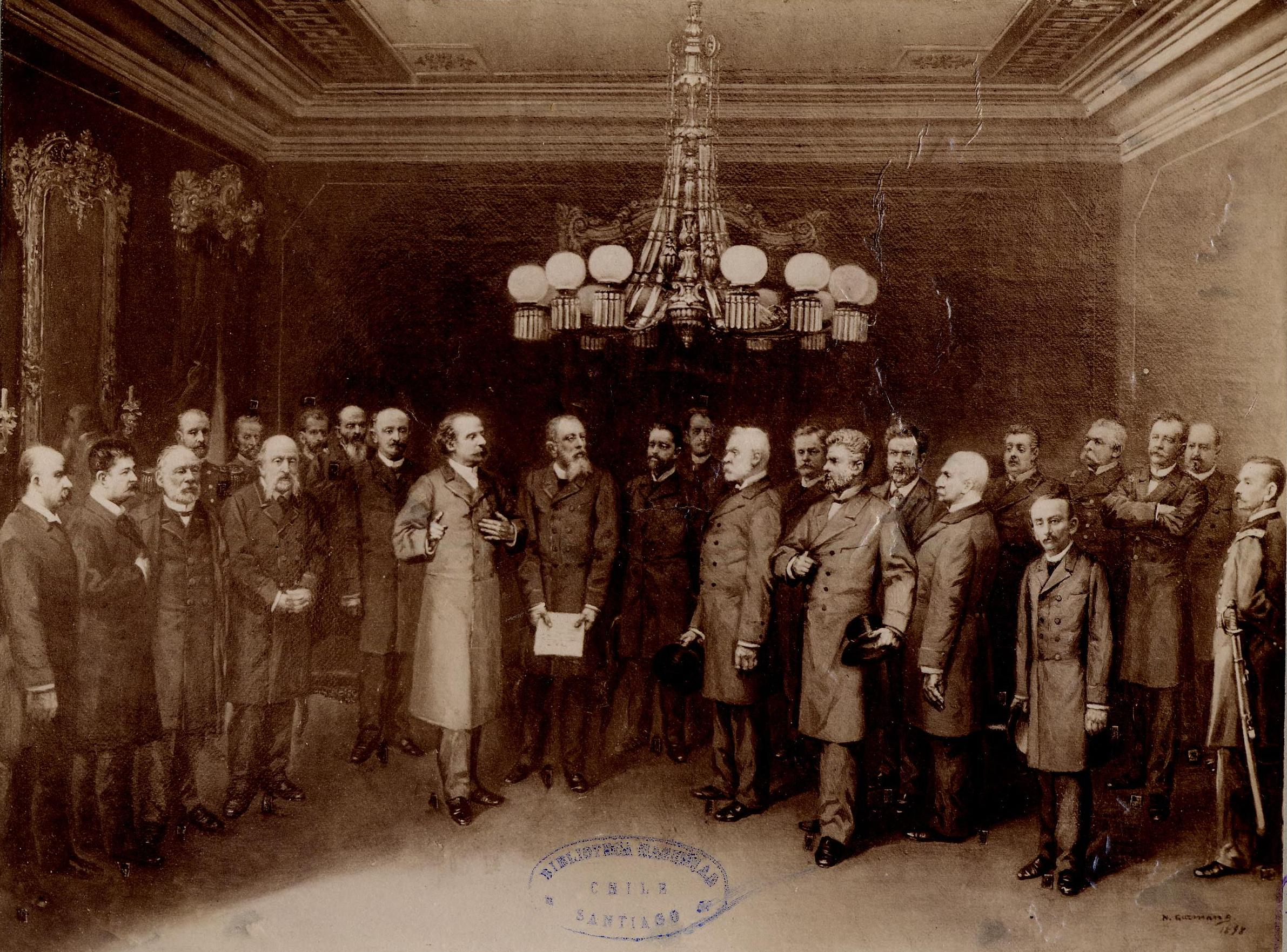
Meeting of notables in the Theater of Santiago with President José Manuel Balmaceda, (1898)

- ÁLVAREZ URQUIETA, LUIS. Painting in Chile Luis Álvarez Urquieta Collection. Santiago, 1928.
- BENEZIT, E. Dictionaire Critique et Documentaire des Peintres, Sculpteurs, Dessinateurs et Graveurs 9th Paris: Librairie Gründ, 1976.
- MNBA LIBRARY AND INFORMATION CENTER. Documentary Archive of the Artist Eugenio Guzmán Ovalle.
- BINDIS, RICARDO. Chilean Painting: From Gil de Castro to the present day. Santiago: Editorial Philips Chilena, 1980.
- BINDIS, RICARDO. Chilean painting, Two Hundred Years. Santiago: Origo Ediciones, 2006.
- CLEAR TOCORNAL, REGINA. The Representation of Poverty in Chilean Art, a First Approach. Santiago: Annals of the Chile Institute. Vol. XXVI, 2007.
- MANAGEMENT, VICENTE. Encyclopedia of Art in America: Biographies. Buenos Aires: OMEBA Editions, 1968.
- CULTURAL INSTITUTE OF PROVIDENCE. Chilean painting rescue. Text by José María Palacios. Santiago, 1981.
- PEREIRA SALAS, EUGENIO. Studies on the History of Art in Republican Chile. Santiago: Editions of the University of Chile, 1992.

== Gallery ==
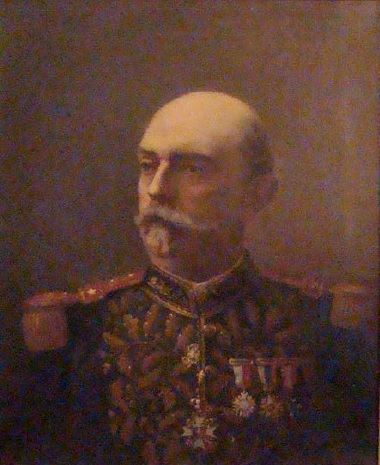
Portrait of Don Oscar Viel

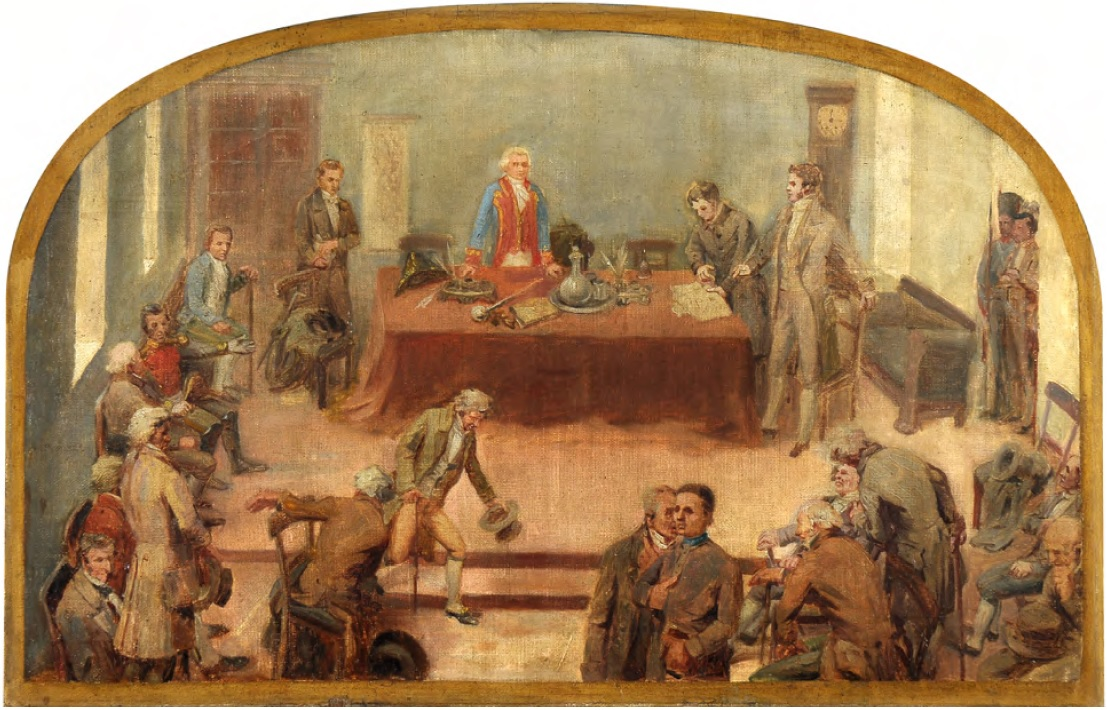
First Government Board Chile

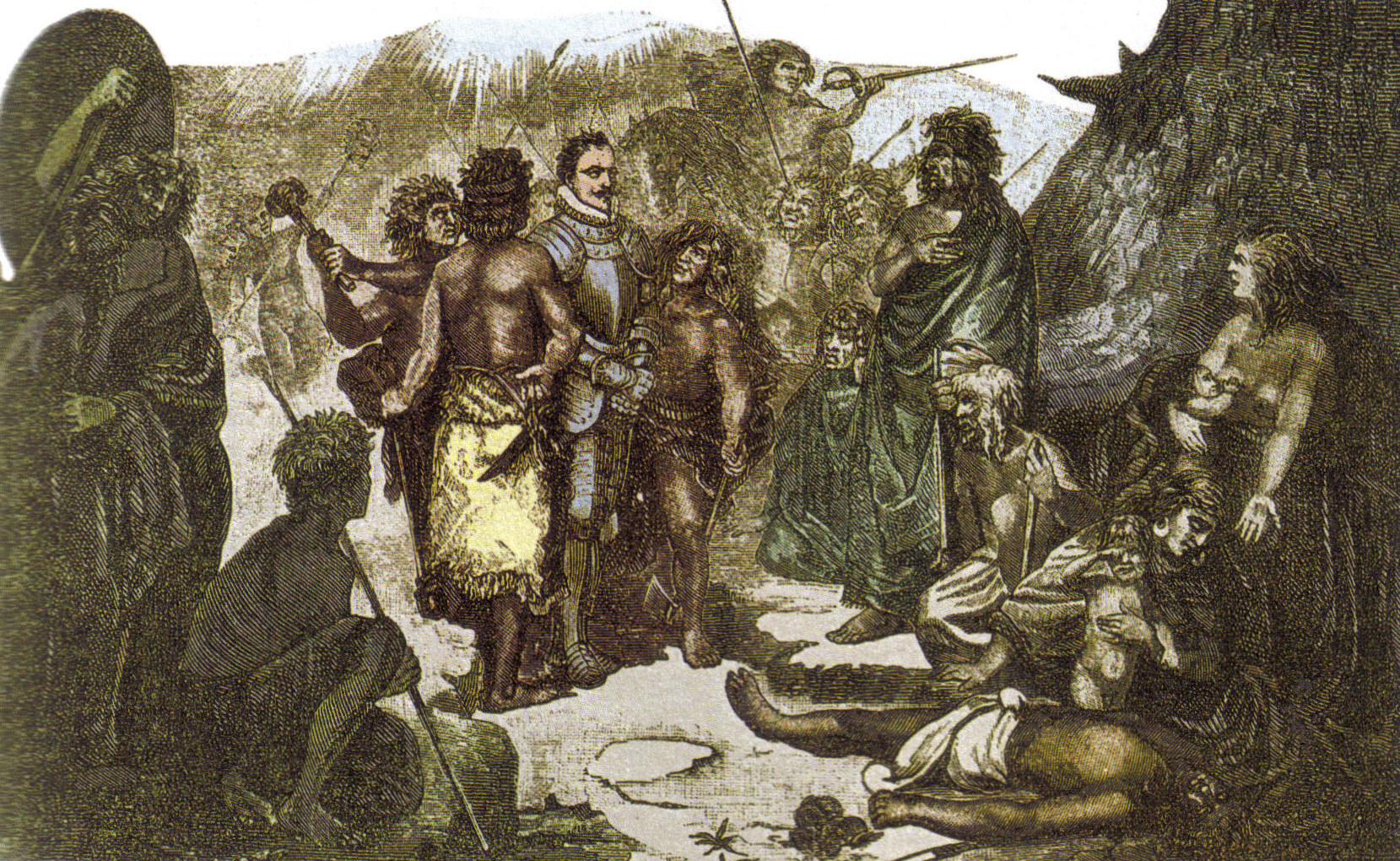
Last moments of Pedro de Valdivia
