= Battle of El Manzano =

Confrontation between Peruvian and Chilean forces

- Part of Lima campaign of the War of the Pacific
- El Manzano hill is located to the southeast of the Lurín River, in the central part of the image, indicated by the red dot.
Date	December 27, 1880
Location	Lurín River, Department of Lima, Peru
Result	Chilean victory

Belligerents
Chile	Peru

Commanders and leaders
Orozimbo Barbosa	Pedro J. Sevilla (surrendered)

Units involved
3rd Yungay Mountain Detachment; 22nd Lautaro Infantry Regiment; Curicó Battalion; 3rd Victoria Logistics Regiment	Rímac Cavalry Regiment

Casualties and losses
1 killed 4 wounded	Unknown

The Battle of El Manzano, also known as the Battle of Pachacamac was a confrontation between Peruvian and Chilean forces that occurred on December 27, 1880 in the El Manzano hills on the south side of the Lurín River during the Lima campaign during the War of the Pacific.

== Background ==
When the landing of Chilean troops led by Patricio Lynch in Pisco became known in Lima, Colonel Pedro José Sevilla was ordered with 250 cavalry soldiers to harass Lynch's march to the north, which did not yield the expected results. The Chilean brigade arrived without fighting at the point where the rest of the landed army was waiting in Lurín and Curayaco, leaving the troops from Sevilla in the rear. Sevilla, who knew about the new landing in Lurín, thought that this wouldn't have occupied the interior, so he continued his journey relatively close to the coast and without outposts observing the road. He also sent a notice to Lima announcing his return and the itinerary he hoped to follow.

== The Battle ==
The courier with the news was taken prisoner and with this information, Orozimbo Barbosa, head of the second brigade of the second division, prepared a trap for Sevilla and his cavalry.

Barbosa arranged the 3rd Yungay Mountain Detachment, the 22nd Lautaro Infantry Regiment, the Curicó Battalion and the 3rd Victoria Logistics Regiment in a staggered manner around the road that Sevilla had announced to Lima, taking advantage of the incompetence to avoid friendly fire

The unequal combat began on the night of December 27 and continued sporadically until dawn. On the next and subsequent day, a search and pursuit began for the horsemen who were able to escape.

=== The Capture ===
Emilio Sotomayor Baeza, head of the II Division, was informed about the capture of the commander of the Rimac regiment, Colonel Sevilla, 9 officers, 1 surgeon, 1 intern, 1 telegraph operator and 120 troops. Barbosa also reported the capture of 100 Remington carbines, spears, sabers and 120 horses, and as a complement, more than 1000 animals including cattle, sheep and goats. Among the war material was also the telegraph apparatus, the instruments of his music band, the regiment's documentation and important private and official communications.

The Chileans had 5 casualties: 1 dead (José Olano) and 4 wounded. Peruvian casualties are not known.
