= Pedro José Sevilla =

Peruvian military leader (1815–1892)

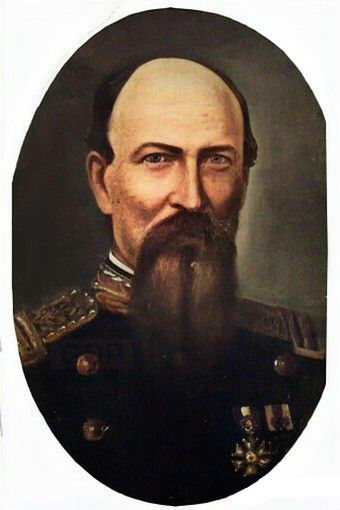
- Born: c. 1815; Piura, Department of Piura, Viceroyalty of Peru, Spanish Empire
- Died: August 9, 1892 (aged 76–77); Lima, Lima Province, Peru
- Military career
- Allegiance: Peru
- Branch: Peruvian Army
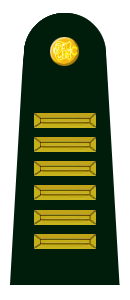
- Rank: Colonel
- Conflicts: War of the Pacific: Lima campaign; Battle of El Manzano

Pedro José Sevilla Yturralde (c. 1815 - 1892) was a Peruvian colonel who was the head of the 3rd Cazadores del Rímac Regiment, as well as one of the main commanders of the Battle of El Manzano of the Lima campaign during the War of the Pacific before being captured and imprisoned in Chile for the remainder of the war.

== Biography ==
=== Early years ===
Sevilla began his military education by studying in Chile at the College of Mora and was a classmate of Antonio Varas.

Benjamín Vicuña Mackenna mentioned that:

The 3rd Cazadores del Rímac regiment consisted of 333 men, and its leader (Pedro José Sevilla), who had bravely fought in Casma and Ingavi, spent those hours as one of the hopes of honor of the Peru, as we have recalled on another occasion. Colonel Sevilla was a native of Piura, and as has been said, the son of a Russian in the womb of a Spaniard, a man with hair on his chest and a gray beard, over 60 years of age.

=== War of the Pacific ===
In the Battle of El Manzano, Colonel Yturralde and Colonel Victorino Arceniega defended the moats and ramparts of Herbay with unusual tenacity and only at five o'clock in the morning on December 19, 1880, did they abandon their defenses and headed to Cañete.

Sevilla retired to the town of Mala, where he received orders by telegraph to move to the nearby town of Calango and, with the aid of the militia, harass the Chilean occupants.

Seville communicated the news to Nicolás de Piérola, stating:

Lima. Received at 2:55 a.m. on December 19, 1880. His Excellency Supreme Chief: After the Subprefect reoccupied Herbay, he threw himself at the enemy about a league away. I hasten to protect the infantry with cavalry and after a sustained fire on both sides that lasted about an hour, the invaders gave up the field, retreating hastily. I have some wounded and the horse of a bugler died. Seville".

The second and third telegrams border on military fantasy that does not withstand further historical analysis. The second marks 11:50 pm on the 19th and the third marks 4 pm on the 20th. The only certain thing about them is that they have taken prisoner Soldier Estanislao Carrizo from the " Grenadiers on Horseback" Regiment .

The newspaper of Lynch's march says that: "Colonels Arceniega and Pedro José Sevilla have fled with their forces heading for Lima through the Ants, that is, through Cañete inside".

The same text clarified the casualties to date of the Seville Division: "We have only had five dead men, who got sick before fleeing, 14 wounded and 3 horses also dead"

On December 22, Sevilla's forces approached the Chilean forces at the Hacienda de Bujama. Linea's 3rd "Cazadores del Rímac" Regiment, together with the Montoneros forces, ambushed the dense alleys of tropical scrub. While they were hidden, they let the enemy horsemen advance, who camped and even unsaddled, and only when they saw that not a single enemy soldier remained mounted did they open fire.

For his part, the commander of the Chilean force comments

The presence of the enemy has not been long in coming, since at the moment when I was preparing to cool the backs of the horses by removing their saddles and feeding the troops, we were several shots were fired from a nearby dense forest.

Sevilla then established an outpost in a dominant spot that was able to overlook the area from a higher ground. When the Chilean infantrymen finally charged into the bushes where Colonel Joaquin Retes's montoneros and the 3rd Hunters del Rimac Regiment were taking cover, which in the act of seeing the enemy assault, retreated.

On December 23 there were only minor skirmishes with gunfire from a distance. Paz Soldan stated that:

The very ones that Seville sent to Lima, making known their dangerous situation and the path he planned to follow, did not return, because they fell into the power of the enemy (on the 26th)

Colonel Pedro José Sevilla Yturralde, who continued to harass the 1st Lynch Brigade on its march north, was finally ordered by Dictator Piérola to withdraw to Lima, before being overwhelmed by the enemy with his regiment.

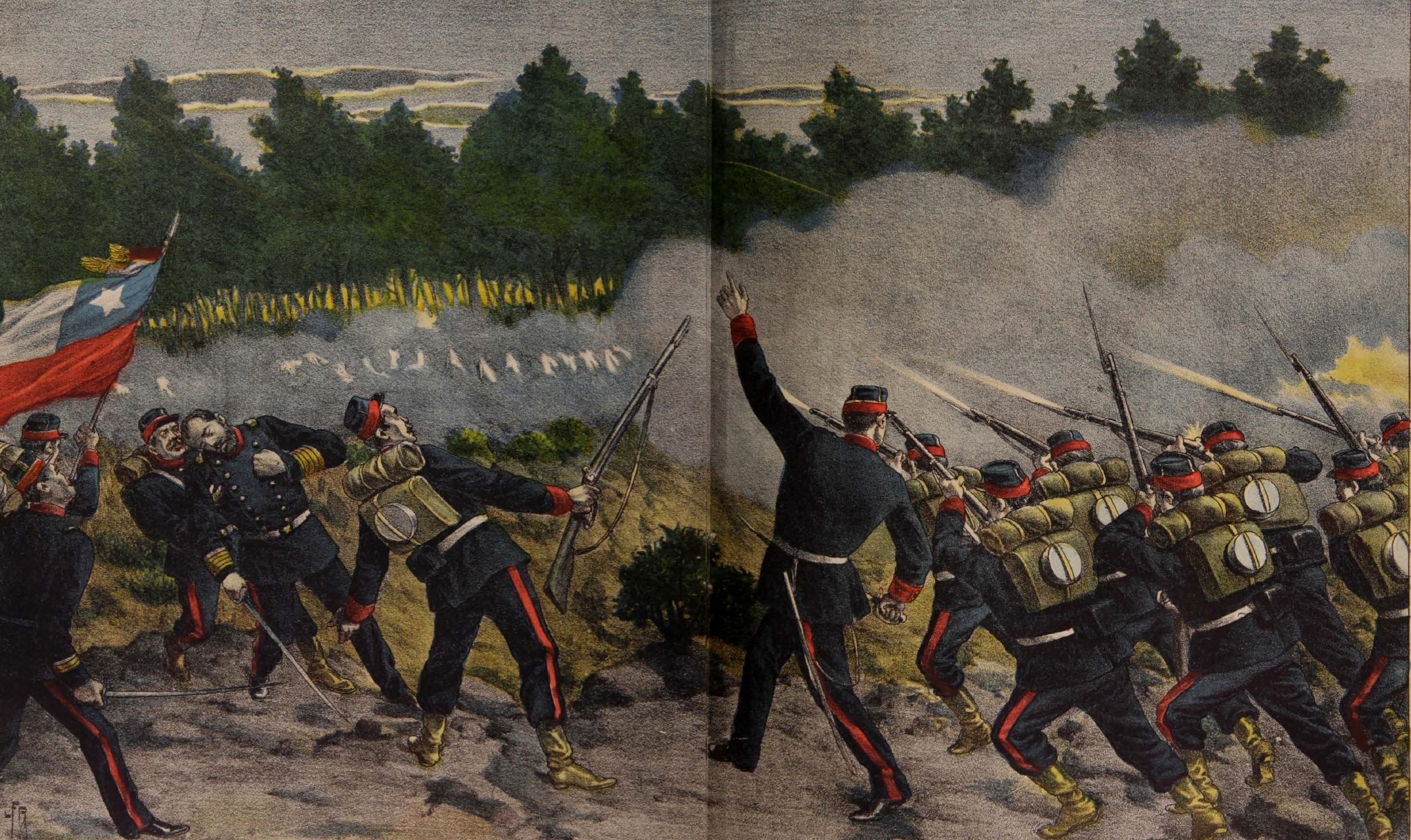
A Chilean depiction of the Battle of El Manzano

Given the circumstances, Colonel Sevilla decides to go through the foot of the mountains to the Lurin Valley, to enter Lima through Cieneguillas. He has been badly warned that Peruvian troops are occupying the valley and especially defending the Lurín River. In Chilca, he knows that the Chileans are preparing to disembark, so he runs to the right to the town of Calango, 23 km from the coast, Valle de Mala, in search of the Cieneguillas road through the mountains. Paz Soldan wrote:

For this purpose he moved with his Calango regiment in the direction of Pachacámac or Cieneguillas, on December 25; but the inexperienced guide took the wrong path and put them at a crossroads of hills and ravines from where they left with a thousand difficulties, on the 27th, at nightfall to the Manzano hills, dying of hunger and thirst. horsemen and horses.

After the Battle of El Manzano, Sevilla would be held prisoner until the end of the war and died on August 9, 1892, due to an outbreak of influenza at Lima.
