= Fuerte Baquedano =

Military base in Chile

Coordinates: 20.133°S 69.751°W

The Fuerte Baquedano is a large military base of the Chilean Army located in the Atacama Desert. It is located 15km to the North of Pozo Almonte and 16km to the South of Huara. It is considered the largest defense facility in Chile and the most powerful due to the large number of armored vehicles it has. The place is known for being a patch of vegetation in the middle of the desert landscape, since the facilities are surrounded by trees and bushes.

It is the headquarters of the Second Armored Brigade "Cazadores". It was created on December 16, 2007 on the basis of the Armored Regiment 2 "Cazadores". Also located in this Military Fort is the Commando Company 6 "Iquique", the FAMAE Industrial Maintenance Center "Pozo Almonte" and the Telecommunications Battalion 6 "Tarapaca".

The 2nd Armored Brigade is made up of:

- Mechanized Infantry Battalion No. 5 "Carampangue",
- Armored Group No. 7 "Guides",
- Mechanized Engineering Company No. 7 "Aconcagua",
- Artillery Group No. 9 "Salvo",
- Independent Logistics Company.
- Telecommunications Company No. 11 "Huara"
- Administrative and Logistics Headquarters

Fort Baquedano has several vehicles in the base such as the Leopard 2A4, Leopard 1V, Marder (IFV), M-109 and various versions of M113 and other mechanized and motorized tanks. The place has two residential villas, the El Bosque Military Villa for Officers and the Baquedano Military Villa for NCOs.
