= 2nd Armored Brigade (Chile) =

Army Unit in Chile

- Active: 2nd Armored Brigade (Chile)
- Country: Chile
- Branch: Army
- Type: Armor and Infantry
- Size: Division

The 2nd Armored Brigade is a unit of the Chilean Army. It is currently the 2nd Armored Brigade "Cazadores". It is part of to the VI Army Division of Chile, with a garrison in Fuerte Baquedano, Iquique, I Region of the country, this unit was made up of the Infantry Battalion No. 5 "Carampangue" and the Armored Cavalry Group No. 7 "Guides", Artillery Group No. 9 "Salvo", Engineering Company No. 7, "Aconcagua", Independent Logistics Company and Commando Company No. 1 "Iquique".

The armored brigade was founded in 2007 as a result of the modernization process that included the new configuration of the Army force, in 2003 it was renamed.
