= Mariano Vargas =

Peruvian colonel (1823–1916)

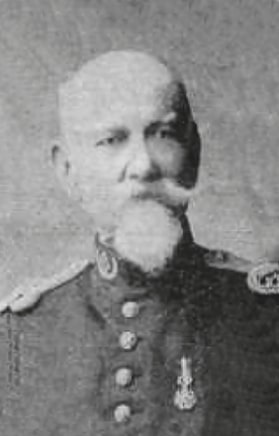
- Born: July 1823; Lima, Lima Province, Peru
- Died: March 26, 1916 (aged 92); Lima, Lima Province, Peru
- Military career
- Allegiance: Peru
- Branch: Peruvian Army
- Service years: 1838 – 1916
- Rank: Colonel
- Conflicts: War of the Confederation: Second Restoration Expedition; Battle of Yungay; Chincha Islands War; War of the Pacific: Lima campaign; Battle of La Rinconada de Ate

Mariano Vargas Quintanilla (1823-1916) was a Peruvian Colonel of the War of the Pacific. He was one of the main commanders during the Lima campaign and was known for his leadership during the Battle of La Rinconada de Ate.

== Early military career ==
Vargas was born in July 1823 at Lima as the son of Juan Nepomuceno Vargas Guimet and Carmen Quintanilla. Two of his brothers, Juan Nepomuceno and Juan Rafael would also go on to participate in the War of the Pacific with equivalent ranks. He enlisted in the Peruvian Army on 1838 and fought in the Battle of Yungay by the next year. He would later participate in the Peruvian-Bolivian War and the Chincha Islands War with a promotion to colonel in 1865. Around this time he stated that he knew what "bullets are".

== War of the Pacific ==
By January 4, 1881, Vargas was given command of the Ate Valley and when news of incoming Chilean soldiers under the command of Orozimbo Barbosa, he began to take immediate action. He began by sending several reconnaissance forces at Pampa Grande as well as in Portachuelo de Manchay which was in the north. He also requested Commander Pedro J. Roca y Boloña for resources to construct a defensive line which were allocated. Despite the increasingly difficult situation he found himself in, Vargas would continue to lead in the Battle of La Rinconada de Ate.

After the battle, he was relieved of his position and would join the forces of Nicolás de Piérola and participate in the Battle of San Juan and Chorrillos and Battle of Miraflores.

== Later life ==
After the war, Vargas would continue to serve in the Peruvian Army and was made a member of the Council of General Officers. In 1899, a full pension was provided to Vargas. Two years before his death, "La Crónica" requested that Vargas be promoted to General.
